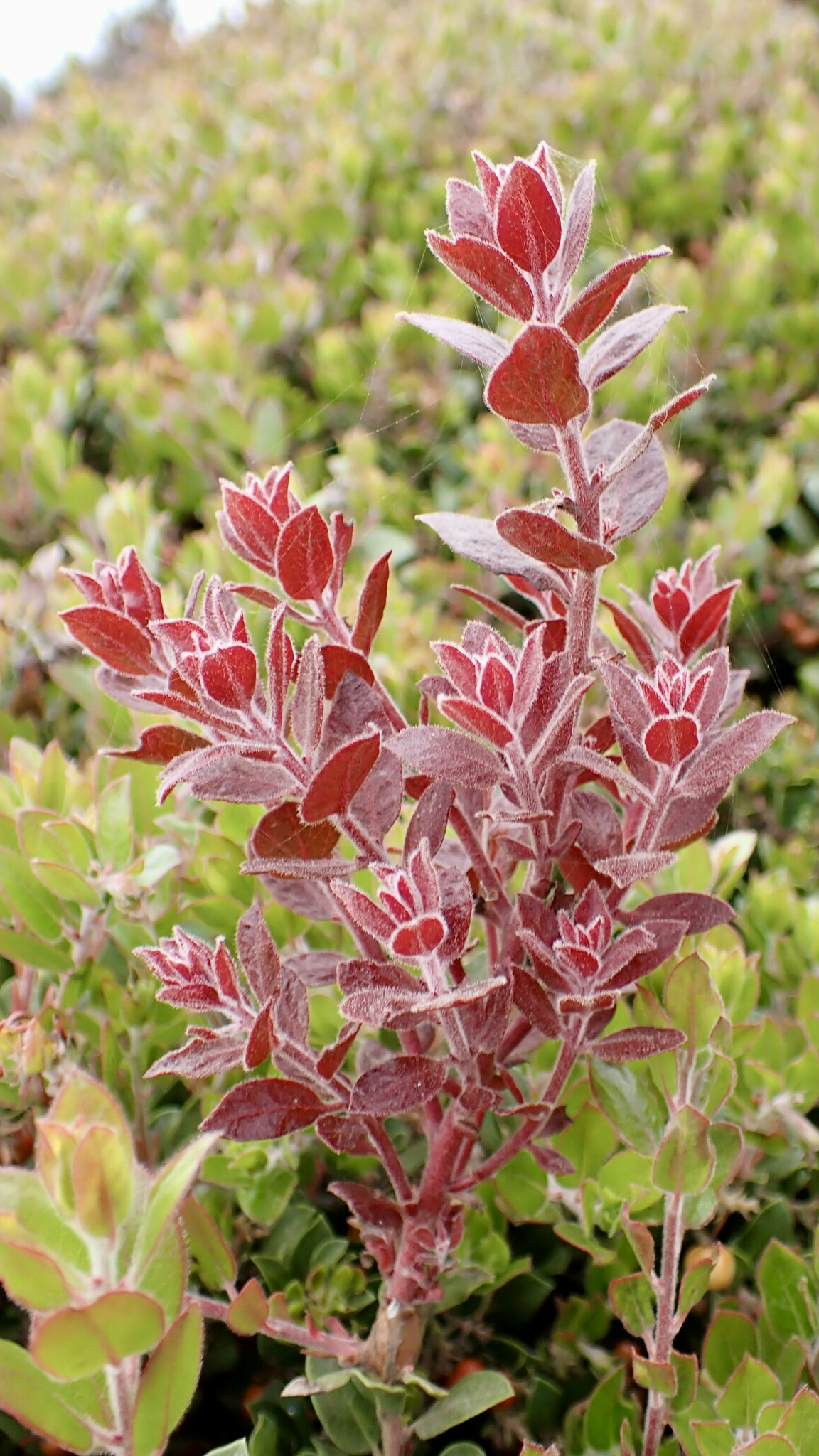
- Manzanita witch's broom, Monterey County, California, 2023

Scientific classification
- Domain: Eukaryota
- Kingdom: Fungi
- Division: Basidiomycota
- Class: Exobasidiomycetes
- Order: Exobasidiales
- Family: Exobasidiaceae
- Genus: Exobasidium
- Species: E. arctostaphyli

Binomial name
- Exobasidium arctostaphyli Harkn.

= Exobasidium arctostaphyli =

Species of fungus

Exobasidium arctostaphyli is a species of parasitic fungus that induces witch's broom galls and leaf spots on manzanita trees.

== See also ==
- Exobasidium vaccinii
