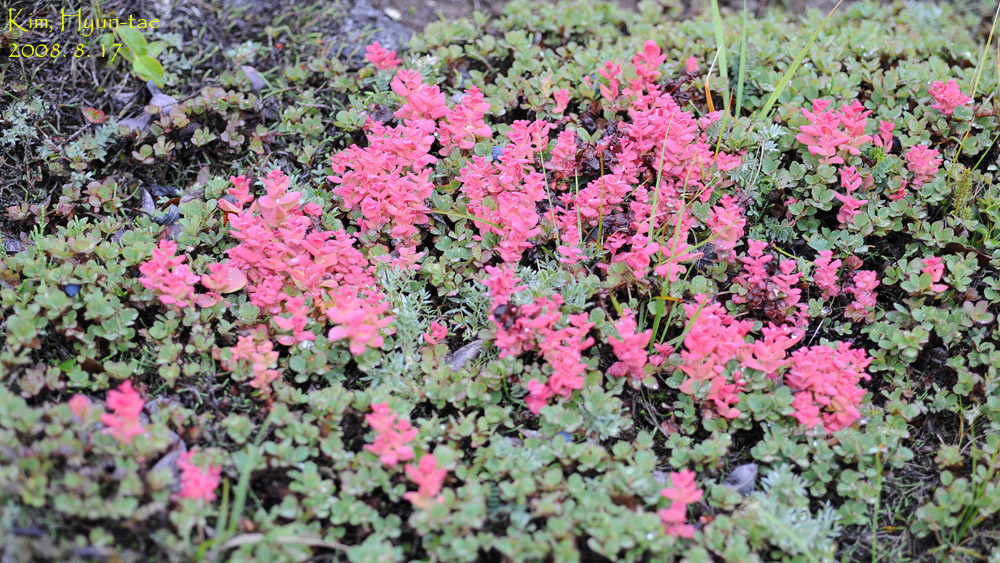

Scientific classification
- Domain: Eukaryota
- Kingdom: Fungi
- Division: Basidiomycota
- Class: Exobasidiomycetes
- Order: Exobasidiales
- Family: Exobasidiaceae
- Genus: Exobasidium
- Species: E. vaccinii-uliginosi

Binomial name
- Exobasidium vaccinii-uliginosi Boud. (1894)

= Exobasidium vaccinii-uliginosi =

Species of fungus

Exobasidium vaccinii-uliginosi is a species of fungus in the family Exobasidiaceae. It is a plant pathogen.
