= Doassansia =

Scientific classification
- Domain: Eukaryota
- Kingdom: Fungi
- Division: Basidiomycota
- Class: Exobasidiomycetes
- Order: Doassansiales
- Family: Doassansiaceae
- Genus: Doassansia; Cornu

Synonyms
- Setchellia Magnus, 1896

Genus of fungi

Doassansia is a genus of fungi belonging to the family Doassansiaceae.

The species of this genus are found in Europe and Northern America.

== Ecology ==
They are parasitic on plants, attaching to leaves and stems of monocotyledons. Doassansia sagittariae and Doassansiopsis deformans can be found on plants of Sagittaria lancifolia, Doassansia alismatis can be found on various species of Alisma and both Doassansiopsis occulta and Doassansiopsis hydrophila can be found on various species of Potamogeton plants.

== Species ==
As accepted by GBIF;

- Doassansia alismatis (Nees ex Fr.) Cornu
- Doassansia alpina Lavrov
- Doassansia borealis Liro
- Doassansia disticha S.Ito
- Doassansia domingensis Cif.
- Doassansia eichhorniae Cif.
- Doassansia epilobii Farl.
- Doassansia epilobii Farl. ex De Toni
- Doassansia gossypii Lagerh.
- Doassansia hemigraphidis B.V.Patil & Thirum.
- Doassansia lilaeae Henn.
- Doassansia limosellae (J.Kunze) J.Schröt.
- Doassansia nearctica Savile
- Doassansia niesslii De Toni
- Doassansia opaca Setch.
- Doassansia peplidis Bubák
- Doassansia reukaufii Henn.
- Doassansia rhinanthi Lagerh. ex Zundel
- Doassansia sagittariae (Fuckel) J.C.Fisch.
- Doassansia sintenisii Bres.
- Doassansia sparganii Vánky
- Doassansia utriculariae Henn.
- Doassansia zizaniae Davis
