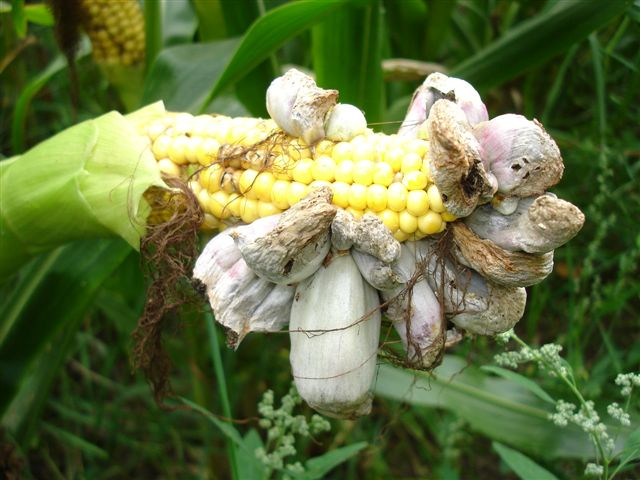
- Ustilago maydis

Scientific classification
- Kingdom: Fungi
- Division: Basidiomycota
- Subdivision: Ustilaginomycotina; Doweld (2001)

Classes and orders
- Exobasidiomycetes Ceraceosorales Doassansiales Entylomatales Exobasidiales Georgefischeriales Microstromatales Tilletiales Ustilaginomycetes Urocystales Ustilaginales Malasseziomycetes Malasseziales Monilielliomycetes Moniliellales Peribolosporomycetes Peribolosporales

= Ustilaginomycotina =

Subdivision of fungi

The Ustilaginomycotina is a subdivision within the division Basidiomycota of the kingdom Fungi. It consists of the classes Ustilaginomycetes and Exobasidiomycetes, and in 2014 the subdivision was reclassified and the two additional classes Malasseziomycetes and Monilielliomycetes added. The name was first published by Doweld in 2001; Bauer and colleagues later published it in 2006 as an isonym. Ustilagomycotina and Agaricomycotina are considered to be sister groups, and they are in turn sister groups to the subdivision Pucciniomycotina.

Ustilaginomycotina comprises 115 genera with more than 1700 species. The subdivision is mostly plant parasites on vascular plants, and the distribution of the subdivision is therefore restricted to the distribution of the host. The group is also called the true smut fungi because of the production of teliospores. The name smut is still used as a term since it circumscribes the organization and life cycle of Ustilaginomycotina, but it is not a taxonomic term. Ustilaginomycotina has some of the best known and studied genera of plant parasites like Ustilago and Tilletia and it is also of great economic importance.

== Morphology ==
Ustilaginomycotina is morphologically a highly diverse group. It consists of two states: anamorphic yeast state and teleomorphic filamentous smut state. These two states in the life cycle can look very different.

=== Defining features ===
The Ustilaginomycotina has different ultrastructural morphologies that defines the subdivision and some of them are also used to delimit the classes in the subdivision.

Cellular interaction

The cellular interactions are referring to the interaction between the hyphae and the host plant cells. These zones provide a useful ultrastructural character for delimiting the classes in Ustilaginomycotina. The host-interactions zones can either be local interaction zones and then characterizing the Exobasidiomycetes, or enlarged interaction zones characterizing the Ustilaginomycetes.

Cellular composition

Ustilaginomycotina has a distinctive cell wall composition consistent of mostly glucose and absence of xylose. This character separates the Ustilaginomycotina from Pucciniomycotina and Agaricomycotina.

Septal pores

The architecture of the septal pores plays an important part in delimiting the subdivision in Basidiomycotina. In contrast to the Pucciniomycotina, the Ustilaginomycotina has a septal pore with a membrane cap or it is poreless. It does not have a dolipore or parenthesome as the Agaricomycotina do.

5S rRNA

In 1985 Gottschalk and Blanz did a study about the 5s ribosomal RNA and distinguished two types of structures in the Basidiomycota. These two types was named the type A secondary structure and the type B secondary structure of the 5S rRNA. This is a useful tool for delimiting between the subdivisions. The Ustilaginomycetina has the type B secondary structure and they share this character with the Agaricomycotina, and it separates them from the Pucciniomycotina which has the type A secondary structure.

== Classification ==
=== Historic classification ===
In 1847 Tulasne and Tulasne divided the so-called smut fungi into two groups called Ustilaginacceae and Tilletiaceae. Traditionally morphological characters of the basidia was used for the delimitation of the smut fungi group, but after a thorough investigation of the ultrastructural characters the group was revised.

With the use of electron microscopy, Bauer et al. 1997 found two separates lines of the smut fungi, namely the Microbotryales (which is now moved to Pucciniomycotina) and the Ustilaginomycetes. Within the Ustilaginomycetes they identified three lineages: the Entorrhizomycetidea, Ustilaginomycetidae and the Exobasidiomycetidae.

=== Modern classification ===
Ustilaginomycotina consists of both anamorphic yeast species and teleomorphic filamentous smuts. These two states can look very different and is not always easy to connect. The two different states has therefore produced different names on the same species. With the use of both morphological characters and molecular data, the subdivision is now reclassified and many of the species has been renamed by the 'One Fungus = One Name' principle.'

By looking at ultrastructural morphological structures like host-parasite interactions, the septal pore apparatus and molecular sequence analysis a new classification was proposed. Here Ustilaginomycotina consisted of the three classes Ustilaginomycetes, Exobasidiomycetes and Entorrhizomycetes. But, the presence of Entorrhizomycetes was questioned and are now considered as incertae sedis in the Basidiomycota.

In 2014 a new multiple gene sequence analysis showed that two additional classes, forming two independent deep lineages should be recognized as classes in the subdivision: Malasseziomycetes and Monilielliomycetes.

== Ecology ==
=== Distribution ===
Since Ustilaginomycotina is mostly plant parasites, the group is restricted to the host species of vascular plants, and mainly on angiosperms and monocots. This encompasses a geographical distribution in both tropical, temperate and arctic regions. Most species are highly host-specific and this may be a product of coevolution with different angiosperm lineages. This is supported by studies that shows that some monophyletic lineages in the Ustilaginomycotina are restricted to monophyletic lineages in the angiosperms. But not all taxa in Ustilaginomycotina are host-specific, some have a broad host range and others have also made a host jump to other vascular plants and not only monocots in the angiosperms.

=== Role in the environment ===
Ustilaginomycotina have an array of plant pathogens, and some are parasitizing on economically important species like wheat, barley and corn. In some cases the yield loss is minimal, in other the crops has to be quarantined. Some of the galls produced by the smuts is considered as a delicacy in some parts of the world. Malassezia lineages also causes harm on human skin.

Ustilago maydis

Tilletia

Malassezia

== Life cycle ==
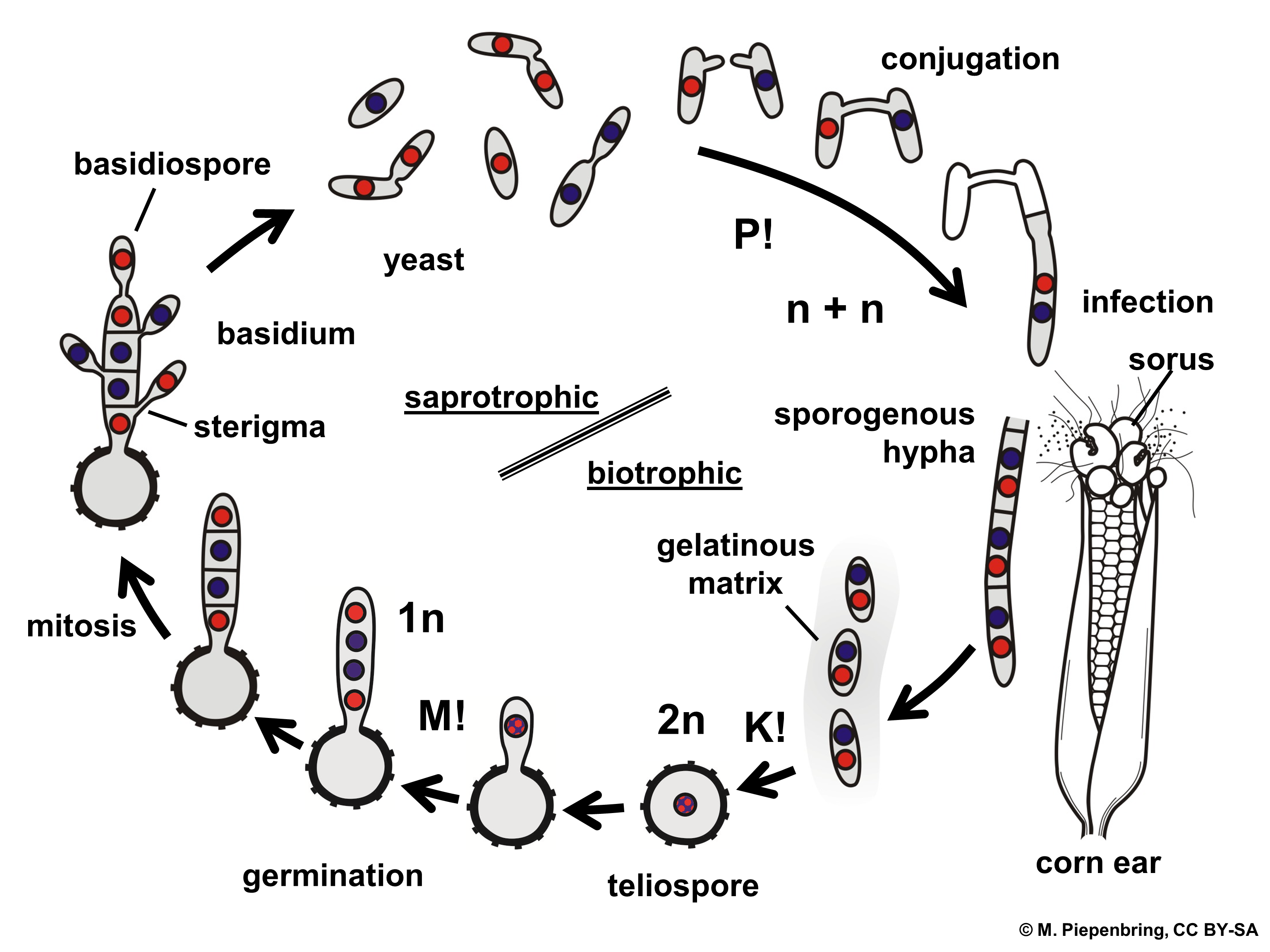
Life cycle of Ustilago maydis

The life cycle of the subdivision is dimorphic and it consists of two phases in the life cycle. One saprobic haploid phase and a parasitic (biotrophic) dikaryotic phase. The saprobic phase is initiated by the production of haploid yeasts, which fuses with another spore and produce the n+n hyphae which will infect the host. The infection happens with the production of a structure called an appressorium, which is generated by a specialized cell used to penetrate the host cuticle. Inside the host, the fungi will produce hyphae and another specialized structure called haustoria. This will take nutrition from the plant, and is a parasitic feature. Almost all of the Ustilaginomycotina will then sporulate inside the host, and this happens with the spore becoming thick-walled and will separate, now called a teliospore. The teliospore is the most conspicuous part of the individual and represent the smut syndrome. This teliospore is a specialized resting spore that can survive outside their host. The teliospore is released from the host, and it will produce a diploid basidium and the cycle starts over.

Species from the subdivision obtained from the nature will often be in the yeast-like state.
