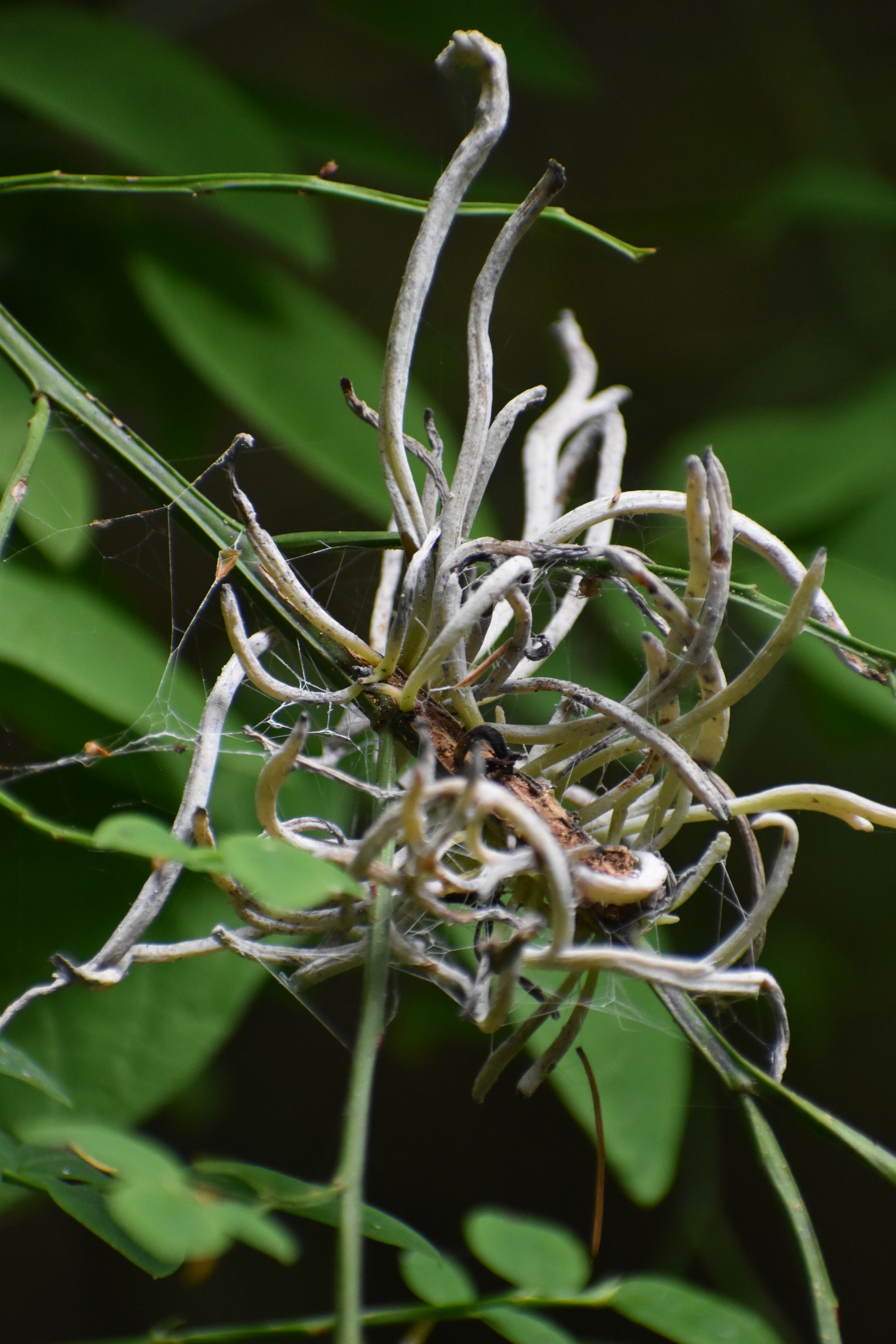
- Exobasidium parvifolii infection of Vaccinium ovalifolium near GuuhlG_a Siiwaay (Spirit Lake) in Haida Gwaii

Scientific classification
- Kingdom: Fungi
- Division: Basidiomycota
- Class: Exobasidiomycetes
- Order: Exobasidiales
- Family: Exobasidiaceae
- Genus: Exobasidium
- Species: E. parvifolii

Binomial name
- Exobasidium parvifolii Hotson

= Exobasidium parvifolii =

Species of fungus

Exobasidium parvifolii is a species of fungus.

== Description ==
Exobasidium parvifolii is a basidiomycete fungi in order Exobasidiales. It forms a systemic, perennial polycarpic infection of at least two species of Vaccinium; Vaccinium parvifolium and Vaccinium ovalifolium. E. parvifolii stimulates hosts to from cladomania, diseased accessory shoots, annually. Firm, vegetative galls form in the stams. In spring the stams produce up to 100 cylindrical excrescences. The fleshy protrusions eventually clad themselves with a hymenium. By early summer these turn to "shoe-string galls".

== Range ==
Exobasidium parvifolii is found along the northeastern Pacific coast from southeastern Alaska to northern California.

== Habitat ==
Exobasidium parvifolii grows in wet, hypermaritime forested ecosystems where their Vaccinium hosts flourish.

== Etymology ==
Exobasidium parvifolii translates to "exorbitant inflection" in Latin.
