= Exobasidium reticulatum =

Scientific classification
- Kingdom: Fungi
- Division: Basidiomycota
- Class: Exobasidiomycetes
- Order: Exobasidiales
- Family: Exobasidiaceae
- Genus: Exobasidium
- Species: E. reticulatum

Binomial name
- Exobasidium reticulatum S.Ito & Sawada

Species of fungus

Exobasidium reticulatum is a species of fungus in the family Exobasidiaceae. It is a plant pathogen.
