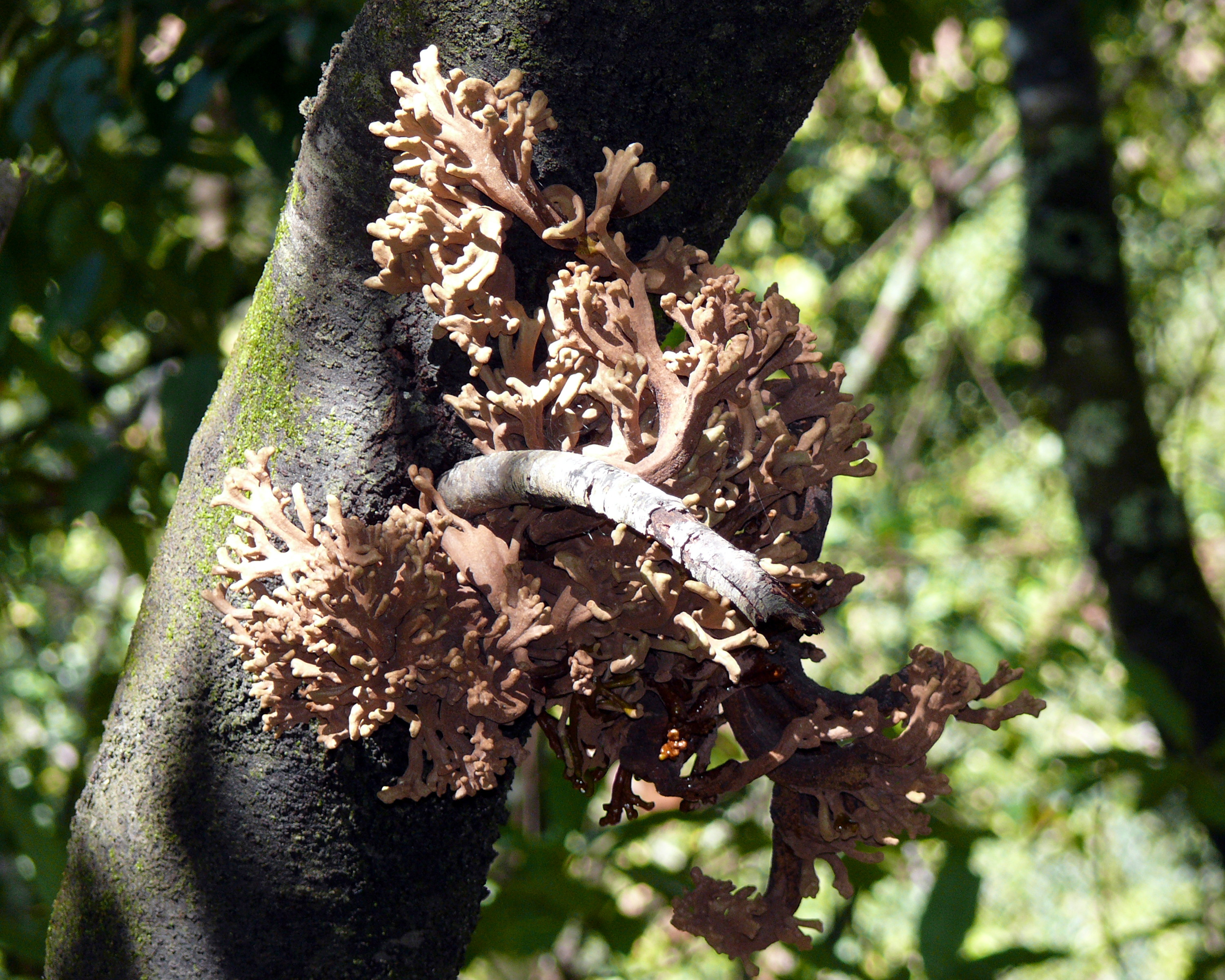

Scientific classification
- Kingdom: Fungi
- Division: Basidiomycota
- Class: Exobasidiomycetes
- Order: Exobasidiales
- Family: Exobasidiaceae
- Genus: Laurobasidium; Jülich

Type species
- Laurobasidium lauri (Geyl.) Jülich

= Laurobasidium =

Genus of fungi

Laurobasidium is a genus of fungi in the Exobasidiaceae family. The genus contains two species. One is Laurobasidium lauri, found in Europe and described by W. Jülich in 1982, and another is L. hachijoense, found in Hachijō-jima, Japan and described in 1985.

Laurobasidium lauri grows solely on laurel (genus Laurus), Laurus novocanariensis on Madeira and the Canary Islands and Laurus nobilis on the western Iberian Peninsula. L. hachijoense grows solely on the Japanese cinnamon, Cinnamomum japonicum.
