= Muribasidiospora =

Scientific classification
- Kingdom: Fungi
- Division: Basidiomycota
- Class: Exobasidiomycetes
- Order: Exobasidiales
- Family: Exobasidiaceae
- Genus: Muribasidiospora; Kamat & Rajendren

Type species
- Muribasidiospora indica Kamat & Rajendren

Species
- M. celtidis M. gordoniae M. hesperidum M. indica

Genus of fungi

Muribasidiospora is a genus of fungi in the Exobasidiaceae family. The genus contains four species that are found in India and Taiwan.
