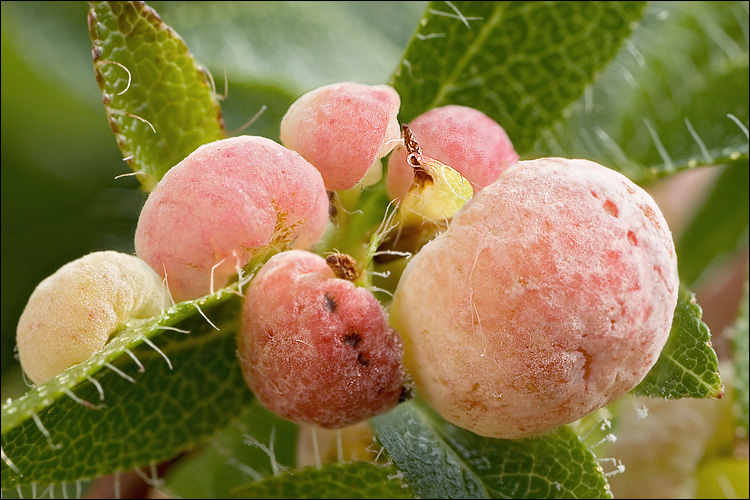
- Exobasidium rhododendri growing on Rhododendron hirsutum

Scientific classification
- Domain: Eukaryota
- Kingdom: Fungi
- Division: Basidiomycota
- Class: Exobasidiomycetes
- Order: Exobasidiales
- Family: Exobasidiaceae
- Genus: Exobasidium; Woronin

Type species
- Exobasidium vaccinii (Fuckel) Woronin

Species
- See text

Synonyms
- Arcticomyces Savile, 1959

= Exobasidium =

Genus of fungi

Exobasidium is a genus of fungi in the family Exobasidiaceae. The genus has a widespread distribution, especially in northern temperate regions, and contains about 50 species. Many of the species in this genus are plant pathogens that grow on Ericaceae. The comprising fungi are parasitic in nature, especially on various heath plants where they cause galls.

== Species ==
- Exobasidium arctostaphyli
- Exobasidium burtii
- Exobasidium camelliae
- Exobasidium cassandrae
- Exobasidium darwinii
- Exobasidium ferrugineae
- Exobasidium maculosum
- Exobasidium karstenii
- Exobasidium oxycocci
- Exobasidium parvifolii
- Exobasidium reticulatum
- Exobasidium rhododendri
- Exobasidium splendidum
- Exobasidium vaccinii (Fuckel) Woronin
- Exobasidium vaccinii-uliginosi
- Exobasidium vexans
