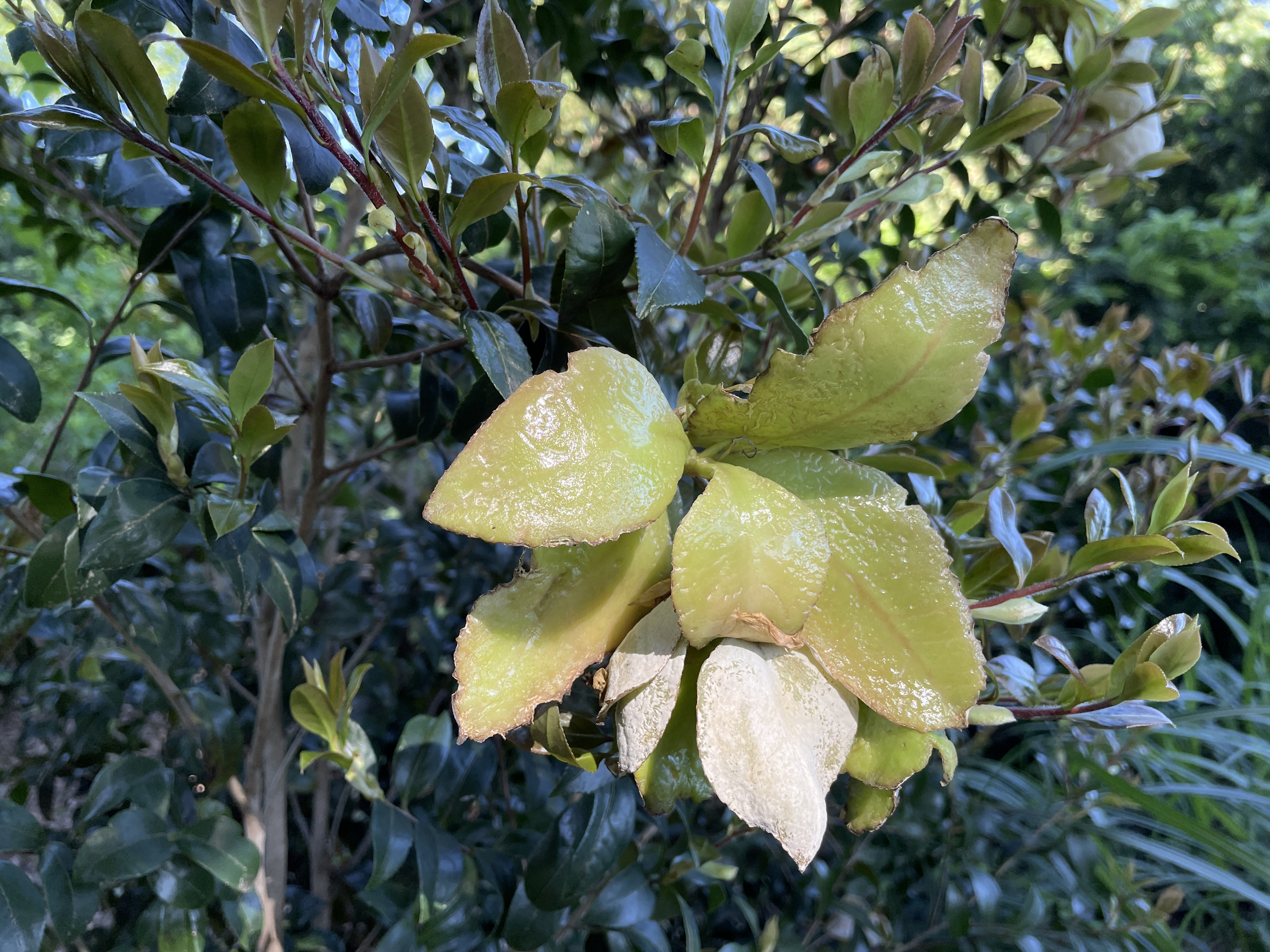

Scientific classification
- Domain: Eukaryota
- Kingdom: Fungi
- Division: Basidiomycota
- Class: Exobasidiomycetes
- Order: Exobasidiales
- Family: Exobasidiaceae
- Genus: Exobasidium
- Species: E. camelliae

Binomial name
- Exobasidium camelliae Shirai

= Exobasidium camelliae =

Species of fungus

Exobasidium camelliae is a phytopathogenic fungus that infects ornamental shrubs of the Camellia genus. It absorbs nutrients from the host through its haustoria and causes the leaves of the host plant to be thicker and lighter green than usual. It forms a hymenium between cells four to six layers above the lower epidermis which is subsequently sloughed off to reveal its basidia.

== Morphology ==
=== Mycelium ===
The hyphae of E. camelliae grow in the intercellular spaces of the host plant’s cells. The hyphae are thick walled and septate. The septa can be either true septa or pseudosepta. True septa are single small pores between cells which have pore plugs that control the flow of material through the fungus. Pseuduosepta are single large pores that allow the movement of larger materials and organelles through the fungus. Pseudosepta do not have pore plugs and form through the invagination of entire lateral walls. In contrast to other basidiomycetes, E. Camelliae do not form clamp connections.

=== Haustoria ===
The haustoria of E. camelliae are projections into host cells walls with slender, branched, fingerlike lobes. A collar of host cell wall material remains at each lobe’s entry point into the cell, and host cells can synthesize cell wall material to surround the lobes as a form of protection. The haustoria contain inclusion bodies which appear in the extracellular space between the lobe’s plasma membrane and cell wall. These inclusion bodies give rise to the haustorial cap which acts as a barrier between the lobes and the hyphae. While the lobes contain similar cytoplasmic material to the hyphae, they do not contain nuclei.

=== Reproductive structures ===
While the intercellular hyphae mostly grow between the second or third layer of cells above the lower epidermis, the hymenial layer is formed between cells four to six layers above the lower epidermis. As the hymenium forms and expands, the lower layers of the leaf’s cells slough off to reveal the basidia. This mechanism is unique to E. camelliae, other species in the genus expose their basidia by growing their hymenium through the epidermis and cuticle of the host cells.

E. camelliae lack a thick walled spore suitable for long term survival, which suggests the fungus survives between growing seasons by living dormant in host buds. When germinating, basidiospores form germ tubes that produce conidia. Conidia can also directly bud off of basidiospores.

== Parasitic effects ==
E. camelliae is a biotroph that lives in between host cells and absorbs nutrients through haustoria. Macroscopically, the infection turns the host’s leaves a light green shade and causes a thickening of the host’s leaves up to three to five times their original size. Inside the leaf, the cells are undifferentiated and disorderly. These effects may be caused by the fungus’ production of indoleacetic acid. Besides the leaf, hyphae are also present in the cortex and the apical meristem of infected shoots. These projections cause the cortex to be enlarged and the growth of hyphae in leaf primordia. While most infected shoots produce leaves that are fully affected by the fungus, leaves can be locally infected.

E. camelliae has also been observed to infect the fruit tissue of C. japonica. The infected fruits have swollen tissue and are covered in a white colored hymenium when the exocarp sloughs off.

== Symbiosis with Cladosporium species ==
Species of the Cladosporium genus have been observed to grow on the hymenium of E. camelliae. The Cladiosporium grow on top of the exposed basidia, lysing the cells and inducing the release of their contents. This is in contrast to other Cladiosporium relationships where the parasite grows inside the cells of their host. It is still unclear whether this is a parasitic, commensal or mutualistic relationship.
