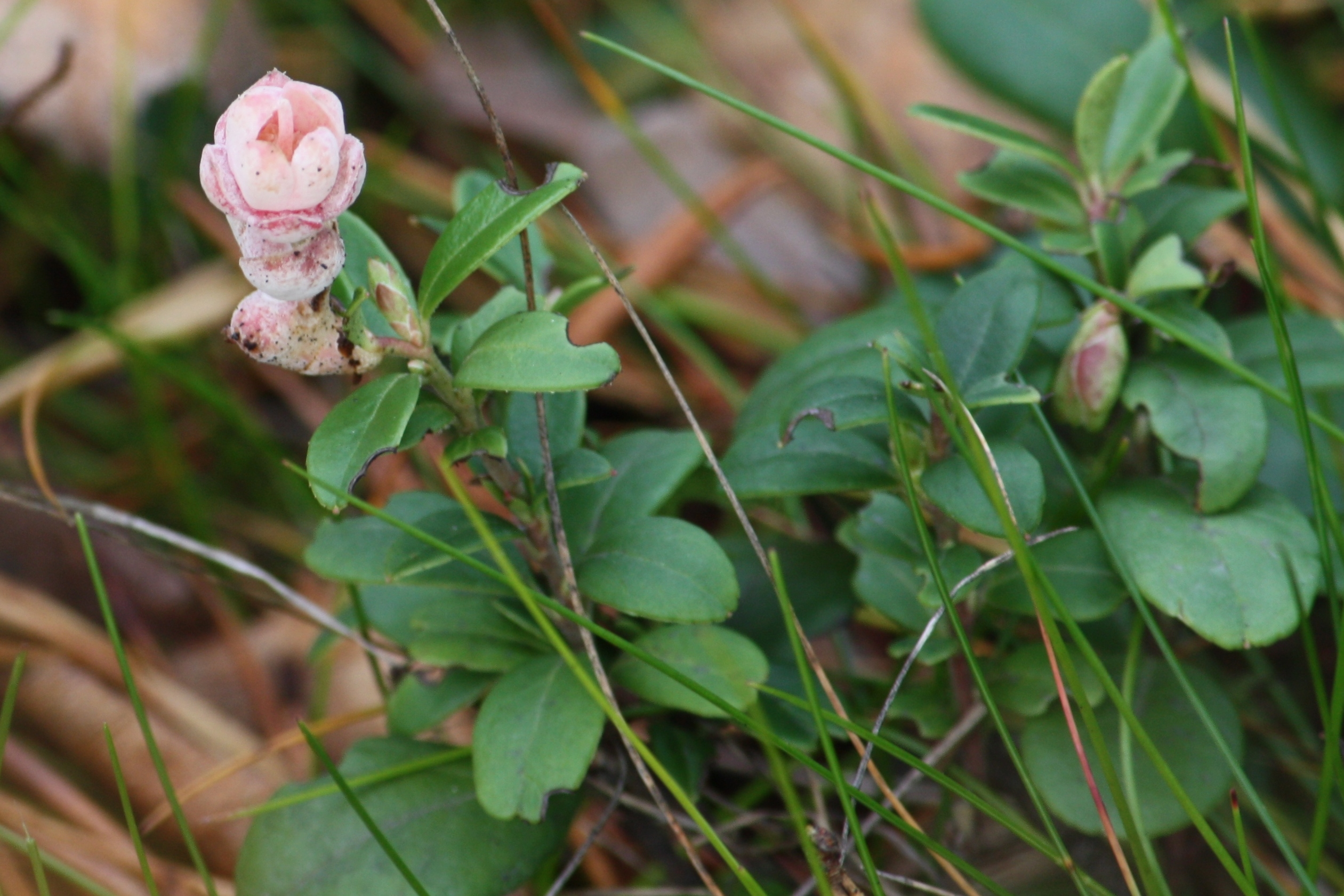

Scientific classification
- Kingdom: Fungi
- Division: Basidiomycota
- Class: Exobasidiomycetes
- Order: Exobasidiales
- Family: Exobasidiaceae
- Genus: Exobasidium
- Species: E. vaccinii

Binomial name
- Exobasidium vaccinii (Fuckel) Woronin

= Exobasidium vaccinii =

Species of fungus

Exobasidium vaccinii, commonly known as “red leaf disease,” or “Azalea Gall,” is a biotrophic species of fungus that causes galls on ericaceous plant species, such as blueberry and azalea (Vaccinium and Rhododendron spp.). Exobasidium vaccinii is considered the type species of the Exobasidium genus. As a member of the Ustilagomycota, it is a basidiomycete closely related to smut fungi. Karl Wilhelm Gottlieb Leopold Fuckel first described the species in 1861 under the basionym Fusidium vaccinii, but in 1867 Mikhail Stepanovich Voronin (often cited as “Woronin”) later placed it in the genus Exobasidium. The type specimen is from Germany, and it is held in the Swedish Museum of Natural History. Exobasidium vaccinii, in current definition from John Axel Nannfeldt in 1981, is limited on the host Vaccinium vitis-idaea. This idea is used in most recent papers on E. vaccinii.

== Morphology ==
In its pathogenic state, E. vaccinii causes discoloration and, depending on the host, may cause hypertrophy and hyperplasia on the leaves and meristem, often forming flower-like structures (i.e. “pseudoflowers”). It may also cause green spots on blueberry fruits, which are sometimes tinted red and have occasional white spore masses. Symptoms within the host plant are often varied compared to other species of Exobasidium, and distinguishing among species has relied traditionally upon spore size.

In a typical disease cycle, leaves on infected shoots will first turn greenish red to bright red when the host species would typically fruit. During the late stage of disease development, the undersurface (abaxial side) of leaves will become covered in a white mass, consisting of sparse hyphae, basidia, basidiospores, secondary spores, and secondary spores forming conidia.

Basidiospores are musiform with a round apex and a distinctive hilar region at the spore base. The spores are hyaline and the dimensions are about 10-13 micrometers long and 3-4 micrometers wide. Some spores have a transverse medial septum separating two nuclei. Woronin first observed Exobasidium’s ability to produce asexual spores in 1867, and over a century later, scanning electron microscopy and transmission electron microscopy has confirmed E. vaccinii’s ability to produce conidia from secondary spores.

There are no known reports of E. vaccinii forming appressoria; however, there are numerous reports of appressoria forming in E. vexans, which is pathogenic on tea, and among other members of the Ustilagomycetes. The intercellular hyphae are septate with short, lobed haustoria. Hyphae and haustoria contacting host cells cause significant amounts of pressure and subsequent distortion in the surrounding tissues. Haustoria contain membranous inclusion bodies and are associated with electron-dense deposits, much like other plant pathogenic fungi.

== Ecology ==
E. vaccinii is dimorphic and can be grown in culture; in its non-pathogenic state in nature, it likely lives in a yeast-like form in the soil or on the plant similar to many of its smut relatives. In its biotrophic state, E. vaccinii gets its energy from its ericaceous host plants. Most species of native and cultivated rhododendron and azalea are considered susceptible, in addition to high and lowbush blueberry cultivars. E. vaccinii is distributed across the Northern Hemisphere, including most of eastern North America and western Europe, according to known studies. It has also been reported in parts of Asia on endemic Vaccinium. Endemic species previously reported to be infected with E. vaccinii in Hawaii has been discovered to be a different species, Exobasidium darwinii.

Spores are produced on basidia on the outside of galls, typically in the late spring and early summer. Eventually, the mycelium present in the leaves colonizes the host's rhizomes, where it becomes systemic; any new shoots growing from these rhizomes are often infected and fail to fruit or flower. Systemically infected plants also often experience higher infection rates and gall loads.

== Agricultural Impacts ==
Blueberries infected with E. vaccinii remain edible, but the spots result in what may be considered “unsightly” fruits. The disease has been observed to infect up to 25% of certain harvests, rendering the berries unmarketable. Additionally, lower fruit yields in systemically infected plants pose a great risk to commercial growers. Gall formation negatively affects reproductive measures, decreasing flower production, flower size, and fruit yield. A study conducted in Nova Scotia found that the disease decreases flowers by 42% and the number of berries per stem by 74%. Branches of infected shoots will also typically die the following year. Recommendations for preventative control includes pruning infected shoots before the fungus produces spores.

== Taxonomy ==
Taxonomic reports on E. vaccinii are ongoing. While Fuckel first described E. vaccinii on a Vaccinium species in Germany, many studies attribute gall formation in multiple species of North American blueberry cultivars and others in native and cultivated azalea. Most of these records and publications do not have a phylogenetic basis for their identifications and rely on the morphology of the spores; therefore, we cannot confirm their taxonomic placement and host relationship without conducting more in-depth phylogenetic studies. One hypothesis argues that in addition to coevolution, sporulation site plays a significant role in speciation. There is also some disagreement in the literature over whether or not E. vaccinii even causes hypertrophy on certain Vaccinium species. However, taxonomic resolution will require additional phylogenetic studies. Originally E. vaccinii was a broad spectrum group but later studies showed it was a complex made of different species with narrow host ranges. Many species once considered E. vaccinii have been separated as their own. Nannfeldt in 1981 "proposed that Exobasidium species have narrow host ranges that are restricted to one plant species or a group of closely-related species.”
