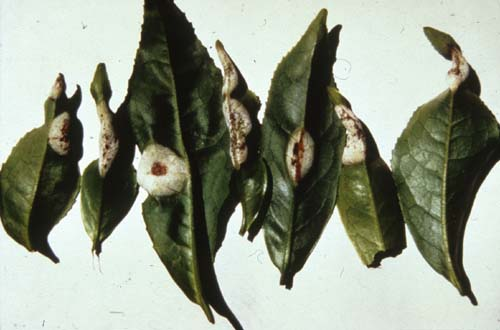

Scientific classification
- Kingdom: Fungi
- Division: Basidiomycota
- Class: Exobasidiomycetes
- Order: Exobasidiales
- Family: Exobasidiaceae
- Genus: Exobasidium
- Species: E. vexans

Binomial name
- Exobasidium vexans Massee, (1898)

= Exobasidium vexans =

Species of fungus

Exobasidium vexans is a plant pathogen affecting tea ("Camellia sinensis").

Blister blight caused by Exobasidium vexans is a devastating leaf disease in tea (Camellia sinensis) in almost all tea growing regions in Asia. This disease causes serious crop losses under inclement weather conditions besides affecting quality of made tea. Although tea cultivars show varying degrees of resistance/susceptibility to blister blight, a cultivar showing total resistance to blister blight has not yet been identified.

The mature two-celled basidiospores are very easily dislodged from the sterigmata and are usually to be found on the surface of the blister. In carefully collected material we have seen the mature two-celled basidiospores attached to sterigmata. Although the basidiospore is normally one-septate, as many as three septa have been seen in germinated spores. The view is expressed that the extra septa are normally formed during germination.

== Host and symptoms ==
Exobasidium vexans is an obligate pathogen of Camellia sinensis, causing a disease commonly known as Tea Blister Blight. Blister is the any several disease caused by leaf curl fungi of genus . It thrives in tea growing regions of Asia with elevations over 700 m and high relative humidity. E. vexans prefers to attack the young leaves on the lower half of hosts and presents as small yellow translucent leaf spots which progress to lesions. These lesions give the lower surface of the leaf the characteristic blister like appearance. Spores are wind dispersed and readily germinate, usually within 24 hours. E. vexans can enter the host plant via the stomata or direct penetration with an appressoria and growth proliferates intracellularly. E. vexans is the most economically significant tea pathogen in many countries, causing up to 50% crop yield loss when uncontrolled. (Mur et al. 2015, Ajay et al. 2009) Tea Blister Blight infection affects the production of multiple metabolites within the plant, including the reduction of alkaloid caffeine, which has a key role in plant defense. (Mur et al. 2015)

== Environment ==
Exobasidium vexans is an obligate pathogen of tea, which makes the study of it difficult. It thrives in humid high elevations in Asia. Atmospheric spore concentrations are present throughout the year, but are lowest January through May when relative humidity and rainfall is decreased, and direct sunlight duration is increased. During these months it has been found to produce abnormally thick walled spores, in addition to the usual basidiospores, that resist germination in vitro. (Ajay et al. 2009) The wet season in tea growing regions runs June through December and creates conditions favorable to endemic infection. Basidiospores produced by E. vexans are sensitive to sunlight and humidity. A wet leaf surface environment of 11 hours or more per day is critical in pathogen propagation. (Ajay et al. 2009) When conditions are favorable the full fungal life cycle can be completed in as little as 11 days.

== Management ==
Detection of tea blister blight is done via a visual inspection of the crop plants for the characteristic blisters. There are many methods of control throughout Asia, with varying levels of success. Most frequently fungicides such as carbendazim, hexaconazole, propiconazole, and tridemorph are used. A 0.2% mixture of nickel sulfate or copper oxide can be applied to foliage to control spread as well. Application of diluted polyoxin, an antibiotic, has also had some success at control and inhibition of the disease. Due to the short life cycle of E. vexans it is critical to apply chemicals weekly when conditions are favorable for disease. The basidiospores of this pathogen are very sensitive, direct sunlight in excess of 4 hours will readily destroy them, therefore other agricultural methods (such as planting rows greater distances apart to allow sunlight to penetrate to young target leaves) can be helpful in controlling disease spread.
