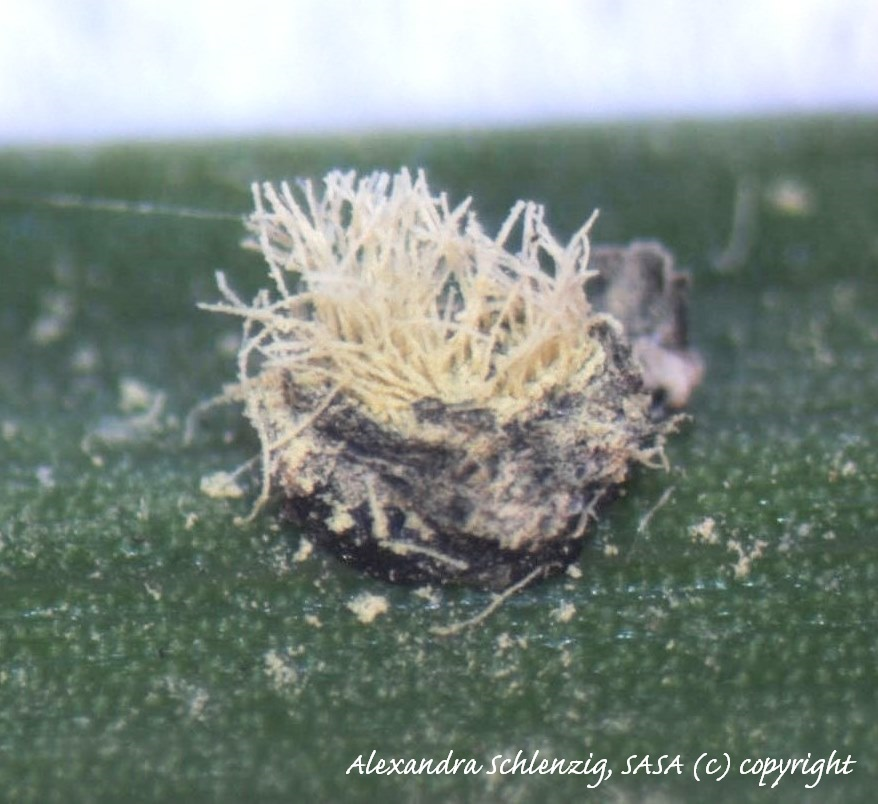
- Graphiola phoenicis fruiting body

Scientific classification
- Domain: Eukaryota
- Kingdom: Fungi
- Division: Basidiomycota
- Class: Exobasidiomycetes
- Order: Exobasidiales
- Family: Graphiolaceae
- Genus: Graphiola; Poit.

= Graphiola =

Genus of fungi

Graphiola is a genus of fungi belonging to the family Graphiolaceae.

The genus has cosmopolitan distribution.

== Species ==
Species:

- Graphiola applanata Syd., P.Syd. & E.J.Butler
- Graphiola arengae Racib.
- Graphiola borassi Syd., P.Syd. & E.J.Butler
- Graphiola phoenicis
