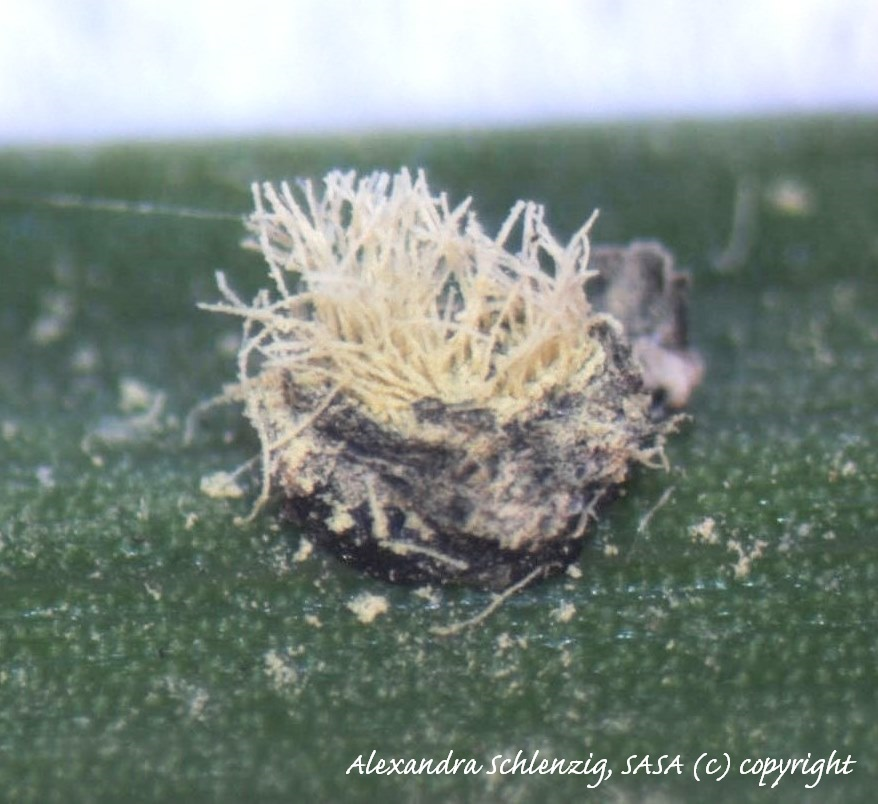
- Fruiting body

Scientific classification
- Domain: Eukaryota
- Kingdom: Fungi
- Division: Basidiomycota
- Class: Exobasidiomycetes
- Order: Exobasidiales
- Family: Graphiolaceae
- Genus: Graphiola
- Species: G. phoenicis

Binomial name
- Graphiola phoenicis (Moug.) Poit., (1824)

Synonyms
- Phacidium phoenicis Moug. ex Fr., (1823); false smut

= Graphiola phoenicis =

Species of fungus

Graphiola phoenicis is a plant pathogen of the palm Phoenix canariensis.

== Hosts ==
Graphiola phoenicis has been reported on numerous palm species, but is most commonly associated with Phoenix canariensis and Phoenix dactylifera. Other palms on which G. phoenicis has been observed include:

- Acoelorrhaphe wrightii
- Arenga pinnata
- Butia capitata
- Chamaerops humilis
- Coccothrinax argentata
- Cocos nucifera
- Dypsis lutescens
- Livistona alfredii
- Livistona chinensis
- Phoenix loureirii
- Phoenix paludosa
- Phoenix roebelenii
- Phoenix sylvestris
- Phoenix theophrasti
- Prestoea acuminata
- Roystonea regia
- Sabal minor
- Sabal palmetto
- Syagrus romanzoffiana
- Thrinax morrisii
- Washingtonia robusta.

== Symptoms ==
The initial symptoms of the disease are the tiny (1/32 inch or less) yellow, brown or black spots on both sides of the leaf blades. The fungus will emerge from these spots, rupturing the leaf epidermis. The fruiting body is less than 1/16 inch in diameter. As the body matures and yellow spores are produced, short, light-colored filaments will emerge from the body, and the body becomes black. These filaments aide in spore dispersal. Once the spores are dispersed, the body deflate and appear like a black, cup-shaped body. This disease is commonly mistaken as potassium deficiency in plants.
