= Dicellomyces =

Scientific classification
- Kingdom: Fungi
- Division: Basidiomycota
- Class: Exobasidiomycetes
- Order: Exobasidiales
- Family: Brachybasidiaceae
- Genus: Dicellomyces; L.S.Olive, 1945

Genus of fungi

Dicellomyces is a genus of fungi belonging to the family Brachybasidiaceae.

The species of this genus are found in Europe, Japan and Northern America.

Species:

- Dicellomyces calami Berndt & N.D.Sharma
- Dicellomyces gloeosporus L.S.Olive
- Dicellomyces scirpi Raitv.
