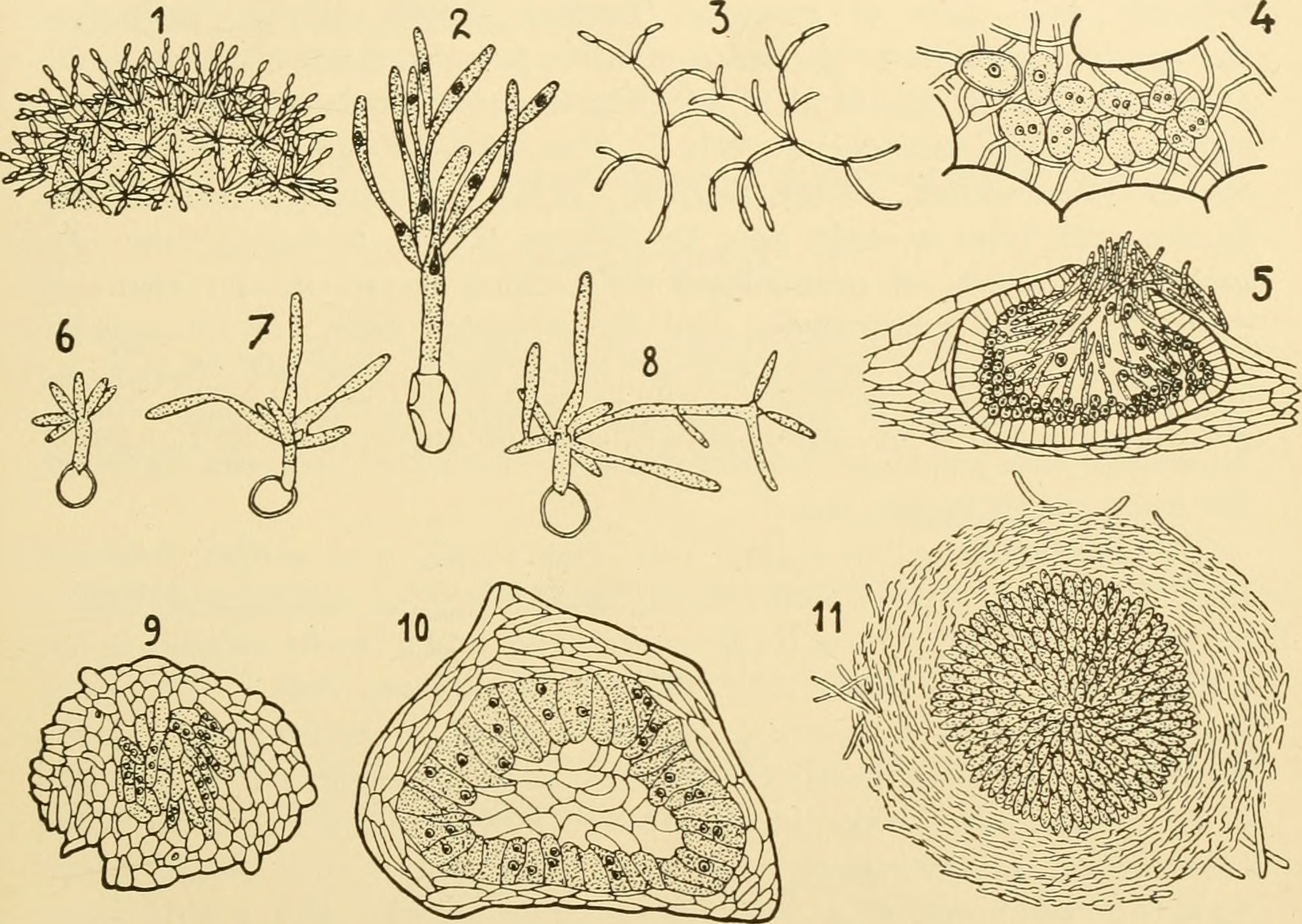
- Illustrations of Doassansia sagittariae, Doassansia alismatis, Doassansia punctiformis, Doassansia deformans and Doassansia martianoffiana from 'Comparative morphology of Fungi', 1928

Scientific classification
- Kingdom: Fungi
- Division: Basidiomycota
- Class: Exobasidiomycetes
- Order: Doassansiales
- Family: Doassansiaceae (Azbukina & Karatygin) R.T. Moore ex P.M. Kirk, P.F. Cannon & J.C. David, 2001

Synonyms
- Doassansioideae Azbukina & Karatygin, 1990

= Doassansiaceae =

Family of fungi

The Doassansiaceae are a family of fungi in the division Basidiomycota and order of Doassansiales. The family contains 11 genera and about 58 species. They have a widespread distribution. Doassansiaceae is also known and classified as a smut fungi.

They have parasitic hyphae with clamps, they are also teliosporic (have a thick-walled resting spore) and dimorphic (can be mold or yeasts) as well as not forming ballistoconidia (air discharged spores) in the haploid phase. The do not have haustoria (root-like structures).

When the family was originally created (by R. Bauer and Oberw. 1997), it had 7 genera (Burrillia, Doassansia, Heterodoassansia, Nannfeldtiomyces, Narasimhania, Pseudodoassansia and Tracya) and 36 species. Then Doassinga was added in 1998. Others were added after this date, such as Pseudodermatosorus in 1999.

== Description ==
They have sori that develops on leaves, petioles and stems of plants, it is visible as pale green, yellowish or brownish lesions with spore balls as very small brown dots. The hyphae are intercellular and the spore balls are globose or irregular in shape and composed of a central mass of spores, with a missing central sterile region. They sometimes have sterile cells scattered around and sometimes have a sterile cortex. The teliospores are globose or irregularly faceted, hyaline or yellowish, smooth, thin walled, germinating to form a short hypha-like promycelium from which a cluster of basidiospores are produced towards an apex.

== Genera ==
As accepted by the GBIF;

- Burrillia Setch. (9)
- Doassansia Cornu (23)
- Doassinga (1)
- Entylomaster Vánky & R.G.Shivas, 2006 (2)
- Heterodoassansia Vánky (11)
- Nannfeldtiomyces Vánky (2)
- Narasimhania Thirum. & Pavgi (1)
- Pseudodermatosorus K.Vánky, 1999 (3)
- Pseudodoassansia (W.A.Setchell) K.Vánky, 1981 (3)
- Pseudotracya Vánky, 1999 (1)
- Tracya Syd. & P.Syd. (2)

Figures in brackets are approx. how many species per genus.

== Ecology ==
They are parasitic on plants, attaching to leaves and stems of monocotyledons. Doassansia sagittaria and Doassansia deformans can be found on plants of Sagittaria lancifolia, Doassansia alismatis can be found on various species of Alisma and both Doassansia occulta and Doassansia martianoffiana can be found on various species of Potamogeton plants. Also, Acornus calamus is a host to Nannfeldtiomyces sparganii and the leaves of Sparganium americanum are a host to Nannfeldtiomyces anomalus. Narasimhania also affects Alisma plants.

They can affect water plants as well as land based plants.
