= Endobasidium =

Scientific classification
- Kingdom: Fungi
- Division: Basidiomycota
- Class: Exobasidiomycetes
- Order: Exobasidiales
- Family: Exobasidiaceae
- Genus: Endobasidium; Speschnew

Type species
- Endobasidium clandestinum Speschnew

Genus of fungi

Endobasidium is a genus of fungi in the Exobasidiaceae family. The genus is monotypic and contains the single species Endobasidium clandestinum, found in Samarkand and named by Nikolay Nikolayevich Speshnev in 1901.
