= Cryptobasidiaceae =

Scientific classification
- Kingdom: Fungi
- Division: Basidiomycota
- Class: Exobasidiomycetes
- Order: Exobasidiales
- Family: Cryptobasidiaceae; Malençon ex Donk

Type genus
- Cryptobasidium Lendn.

Genera
- Botryoconis; Clinoconidium; Coniodictyum; Cryptobasidium; Drepanoconis

Family of fungi

The Cryptobasidiaceae are a family of fungi in the Basidiomycota, Exobasidiales order. Species in the family have a widespread distribution, especially in neotropical areas. Members of the Cryptobasidiaceae are plant pathogens that grow parasitically on the leaves, stems, and fruits of plants, especially those in the family Lauraceae.
