= Ceraceosorus bombacis =

Scientific classification
- Kingdom: Fungi
- Division: Basidiomycota
- Class: Exobasidiomycetes
- Order: Ceraceosorales
- Family: Ceraceosoraceae
- Genus: Ceraceosorus; B.K.Bakshi (1976)
- Species: C. bombacis

Binomial name
- Ceraceosorus bombacis (B.K.Bashi) B.K.Bashi (1976)

Synonyms
- Dicellomyces bombacis B.K. Bakshi

Species of fungus

Ceraceosorus bombacis is a species of smut fungus in the family Ceraceosoraceae. It infects the tree Bombax ceiba in India. This economically important tree is used as an ornamental tree. C. bombacis was originally described as Dicellomyces bombacis in 1973, but B. K. Bakshi transferred it to the newly described Ceraceosorus three years later.
