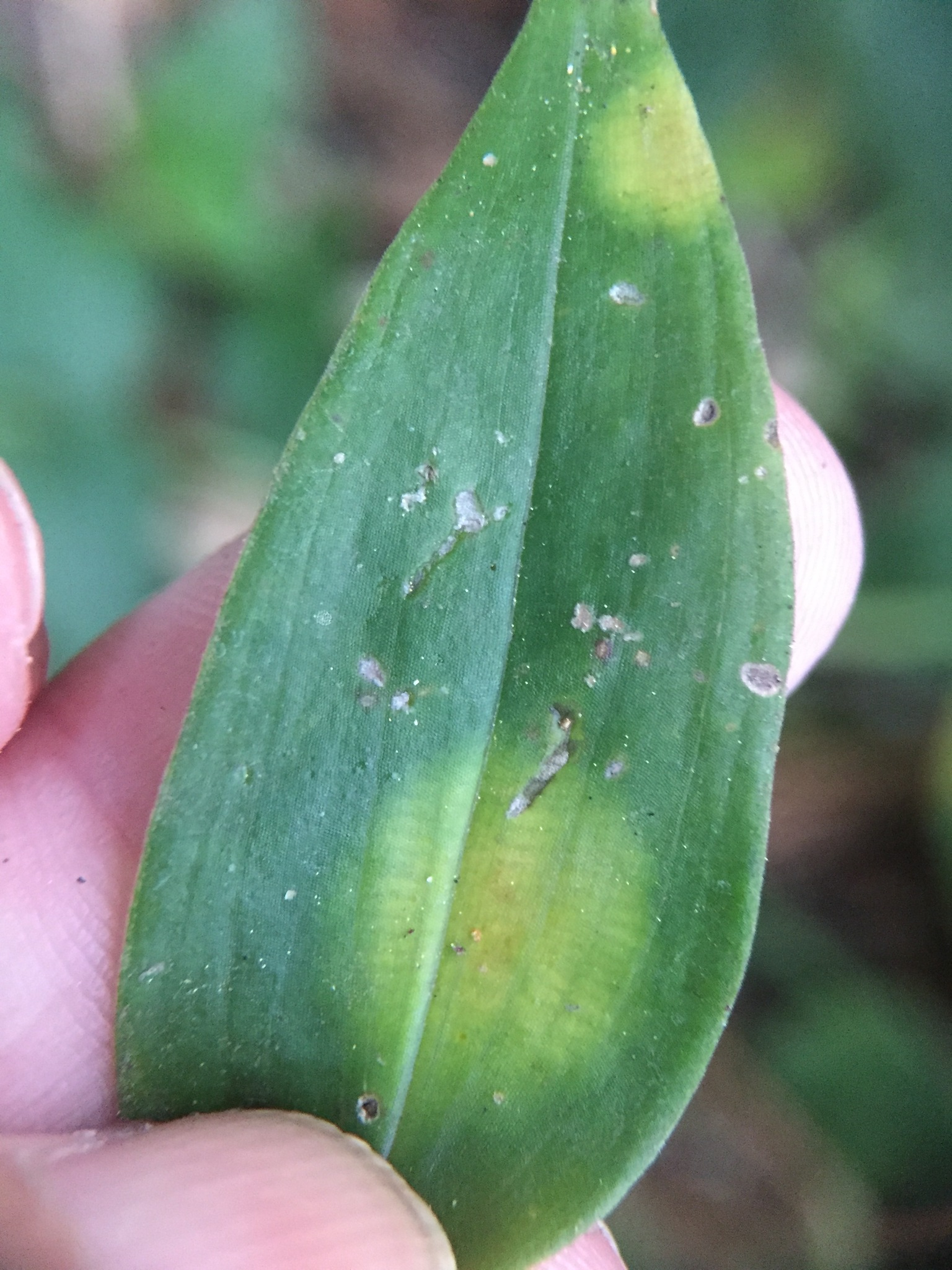
- Kordyana brasiliensis (tradescantia yellow leaf spot), parasitising tradescantia

Scientific classification
- Kingdom: Fungi
- Division: Basidiomycota
- Class: Exobasidiomycetes
- Order: Exobasidiales
- Family: Brachybasidiaceae; Gäum. (1926)

Type genus
- Brachybasidium Gäum. (1926)

Genera
- Brachybasidium; Dicellomyces; Kordyana; Proliferobasidium

= Brachybasidiaceae =

Family of fungi

The Brachybasidiaceae are a family of fungi in the Basidiomycota, Exobasidiales order. Species in the family have a widespread distribution, especially in tropical and temperate regions of the world. Members of the Brachybasidiaceae are plant pathogens that grow on the leaves of plants such as palms, grasses, sedges, and spiderwort species.
