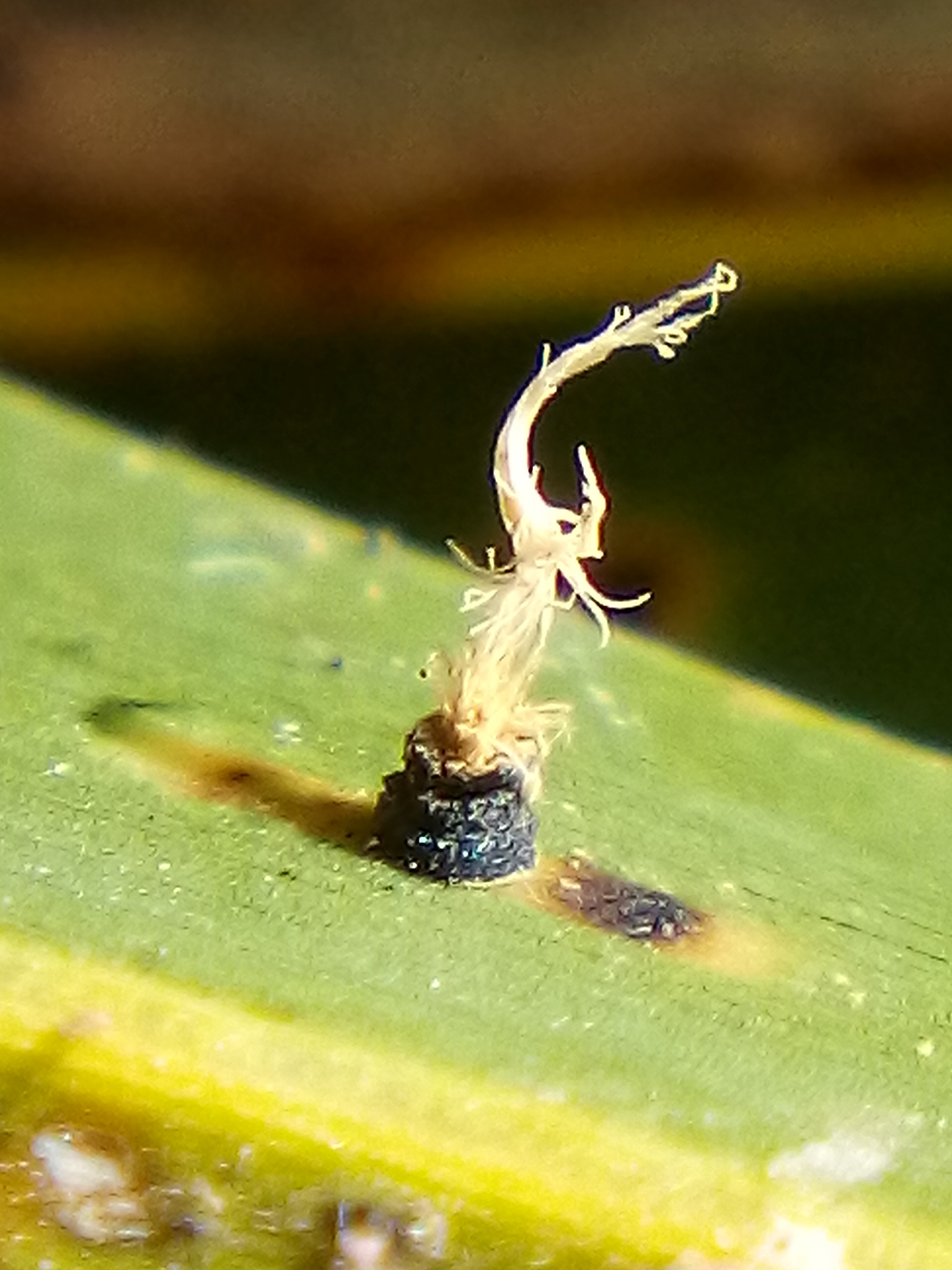
- Graphiola phoenicis

Scientific classification
- Kingdom: Fungi
- Division: Basidiomycota
- Class: Exobasidiomycetes
- Order: Exobasidiales
- Family: Graphiolaceae; Clem. & Shear

Type genus
- Graphiola Poit.

Genera
- Graphiola; Stylina

= Graphiolaceae =

Family of fungi

The Graphiolaceae are a family of fungi in the Basidiomycota, Exobasidiales order. Species in the family have a widespread distribution, especially in warm temperate and tropical areas. Members of the Graphiolaceae are plant pathogens that grow biotrophically on the leaves of plants in the Palmae family.
