= Peribolosporomycetes =

Scientific classification
- Domain: Eukaryota
- Kingdom: Fungi
- Division: Basidiomycota
- Subdivision: Ustilaginomycotina
- Class: Peribolosporomycetes; Witfeld, M. A. Guerreiro, H.D.T. Nguyen, Begerow (2023)

Orders
- Peribolosporales

Class of fungi

The Peribolosporomycetes are a class of fungi in the subdivision Ustilaginomycotina of the Basidiomycota. Species have been isolated from forest soils and are notably heat resistant and osmotolerant. They produce hyphae bearing conidia and chlamydospores in culture.
