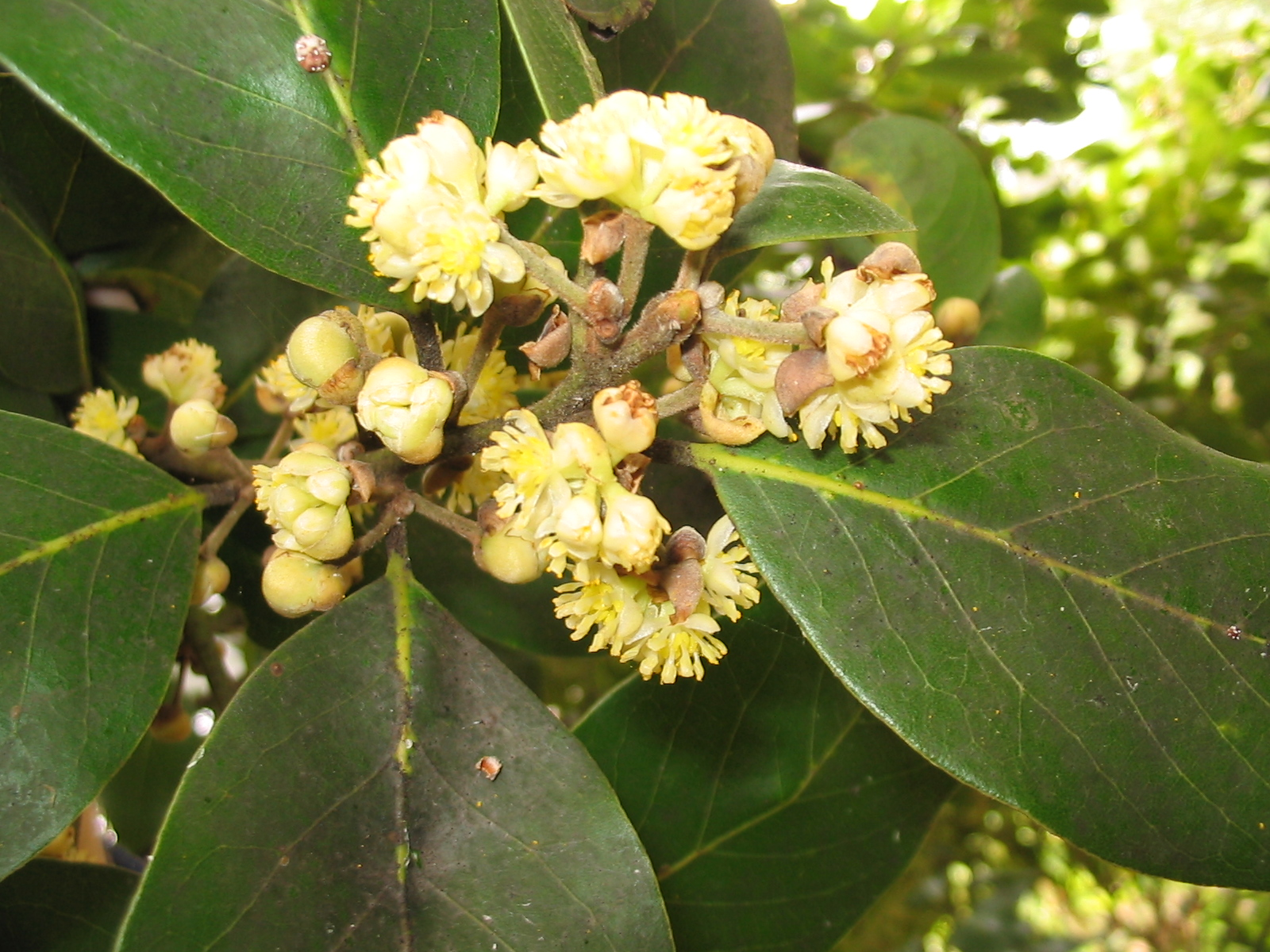

Conservation status
- Least Concern (IUCN 3.1)

Scientific classification
- Kingdom: Plantae
- Clade: Embryophytes
- Clade: Tracheophytes
- Clade: Angiosperms
- Clade: Magnoliids
- Order: Laurales
- Family: Lauraceae
- Genus: Laurus
- Species: L. azorica

Binomial name
- Laurus azorica (Seub.) Franco

Synonyms
- Persea azorica Seub.; Laurus azorica f. grandifolia P.Silva & Q.J.P.Silva; Laurus magnoliifolia Cav.

= Laurus azorica =

Laurus azorica Temporal range: 1.38–0 Ma Pleistocene - Present

Species of flowering plant in the laurel family

Laurus azorica, the Azores laurel, is a small, evergreen tree in the laurel family (Lauraceae), found only on the Azores island group in the North Atlantic.

== Description ==
The Azores laurel is a small dioecious tree, growing up to 15 m (49 ft) in height. Each flower is fragrant, creamy white, about 1 cm diameter, and they are borne in pairs beside a leaf. The leaves are large, shiny dark green, broadly ovoid, 7–14 cm long and 4–8 cm broad, with an entire margin. The fruit is a black drupe about 1–2 cm long.

== Distribution and habitat ==
Laurus azorica is native to the Azores, where it is found in all of the islands. It is a major component of the laurisilva and high elevation juniper forests, occasionally with Myrica faya and Picconia azorica populations in mid-elevation. It is also found in lava flows, margins of cultivated land, coastal scrubland, mountain scrubland and forested peat bogs.

== Taxonomy ==
As the result of a recent taxonomic change, Laurus azorica is now restricted to the archipelago of the Azores, whereas former populations of this species from the western Canary islands including Gran Canaria and from the Madeira archipelago have been described as a new species, Laurus novocanariensis.

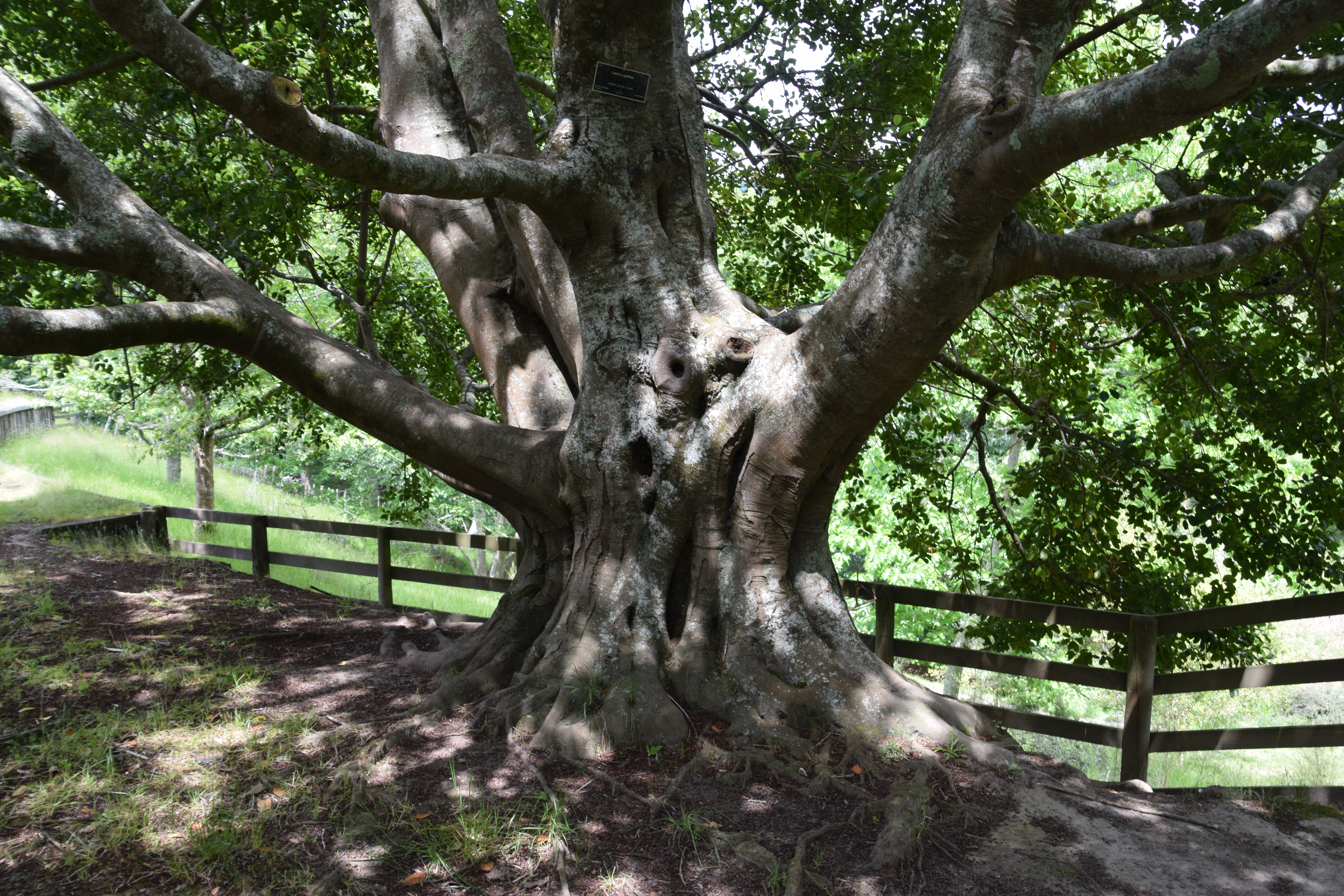

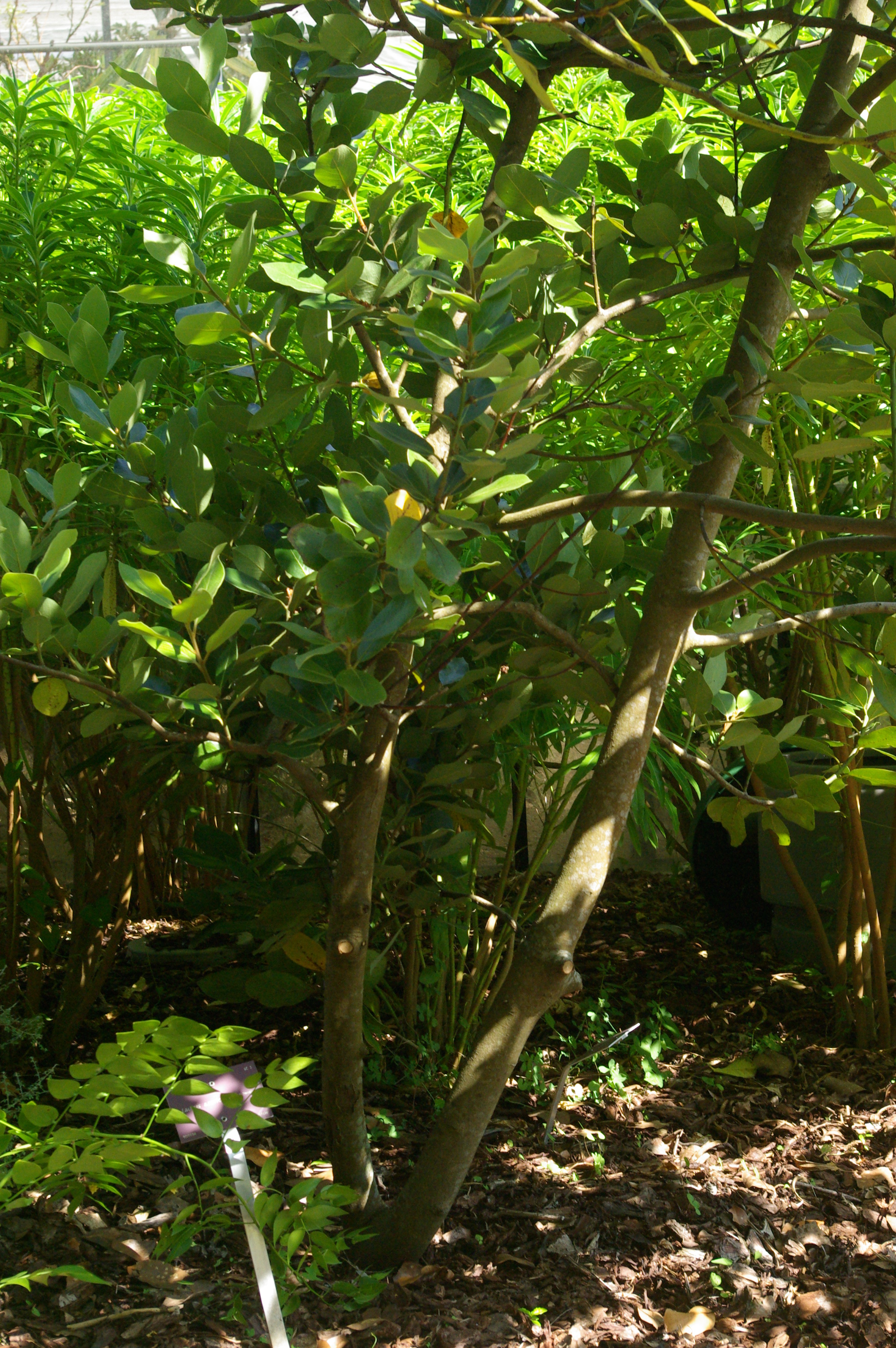

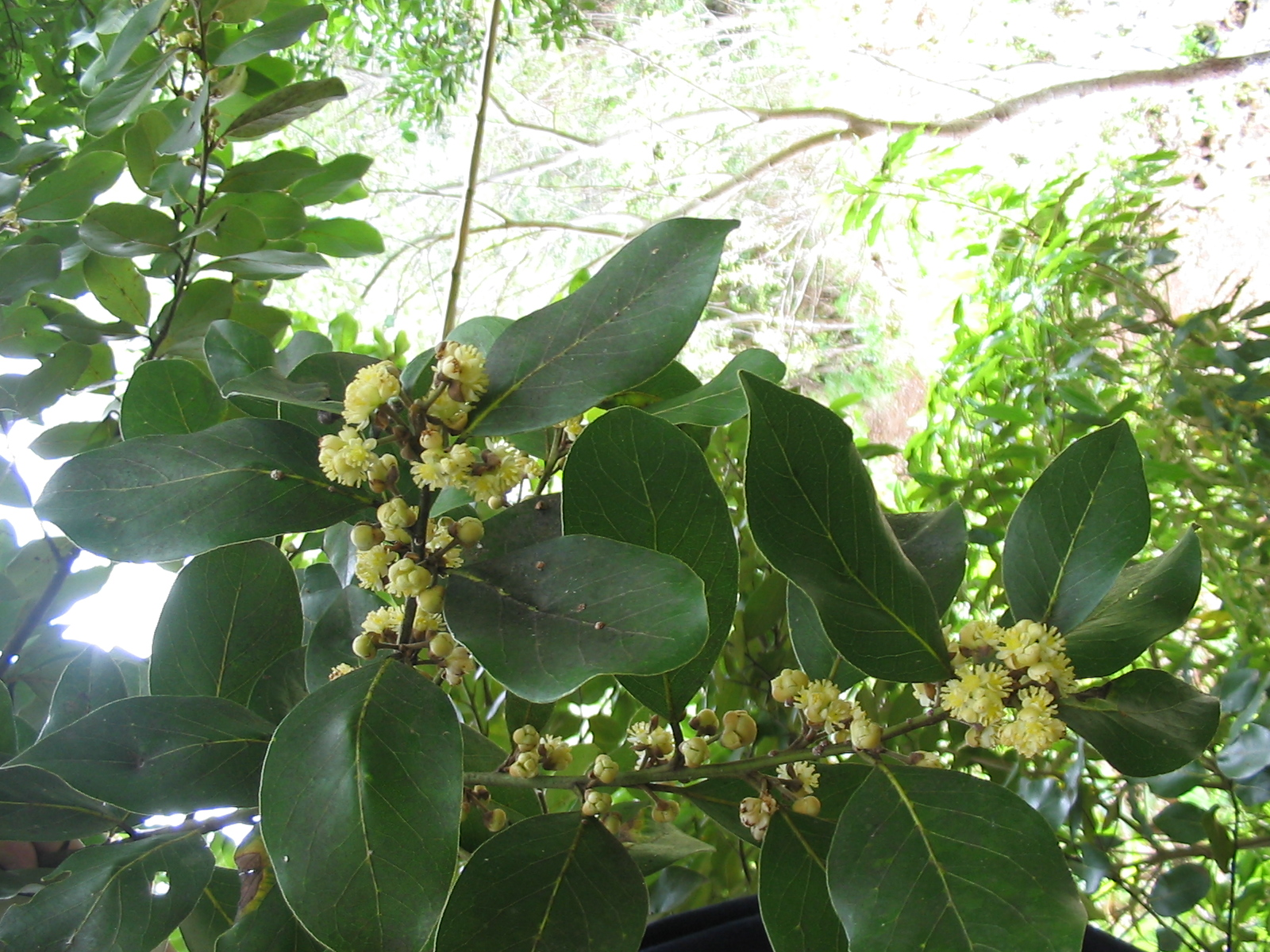
