= Moniliella =

Scientific classification
- Kingdom: Fungi
- Division: Basidiomycota
- Subdivision: Ustilaginomycotina
- Class: Monilielliomycetes; Q.M. Wang, F.Y. Bai & Boekhout
- Order: Moniliellales; Q.M. Wang, F.Y. Bai & Boekhout
- Family: Moniliellaceae; Q.M. Wang, F.Y. Bai & Boekhout
- Genus: Moniliella; Stolk & Dakin (1966)

Type species
- Moniliella acetoabutans Stolk & Dakin

Synonyms
- Trichosporonoides Haskins & J.F.T. Spencer (1967)

Genus of fungi

Moniliella is a genus of fungi in the subdivision Ustilaginomycotina. It is in the monotypic family Moniliellaceae Q.M. Wang, F.Y. Bai & Boekhout, which is in the monotypic order Moniliellales Q.M. Wang, F.Y. Bai & Boekhout which is in the monotypic class Moniliellomycetes Q.M. Wang, F.Y. Bai & Boekhout.

The family, order and class were originally labelled as incertae sedis. Until 2014, when Moniliellaceae was formed.

Some species of Moniliella can cause disease in humans, and also in cats. The genus includes the black, yeast-like fungi in the Basidiomycota, although the black, yeast-like fungi also include some species from the Ascomycota.

== Distribution ==
It has a scattered distribution, found in North and South America, Europe and Asia.

== Species ==
List of species:

- Moniliella acetoabutans Stolk & Dakin (1966)
- Moniliella byzovii Thanh, Hien & T.T. Thom ex Denchev & T. Denchev (2021)
- Moniliella carnis Thanh, Hai, Hien, M. Takash. & Lachance (2012)
- Moniliella casei Thanh, Hien, Yaguchi, J.P. Samp. & Lachance (2018)
- Moniliella dehoogii Thanh, Hai, Hien, M. Takash. & Lachance (2012)
- Moniliella fonsecae
- Moniliella floricola Thanh & Hien (2018)
- Moniliella macrospora (J.F.H. Beyma) Thanh, Hien, Yaguchi, J.P. Samp. & Lachance (2018)
- Moniliella madida (de Hoog) C.A. Rosa & Lachance (2009)(formerly in Trichosporonoides)
- Moniliella megachiliensis (G.D. Inglis & Sigler) C.A. Rosa & Lachance (2009)(formerly in Trichosporonoides)
- Moniliella nigrescens (A.D. Hocking & Pitt) C.A. Rosa & Lachance (2009)(formerly in Trichosporonoides)
- Moniliella oedocephalis (Haskins & J.F.T. Spencer) C.A. Rosa & Lachance (2009)(formerly in Trichosporonoides)
- Moniliella pollinis (Hennebert & Veracht.) de Hoog & E. Guého (1984)
- Moniliella pyrgileucina Thanh, Hien, Yaguchi, J.P. Samp. & Lachance (2018)
- Moniliella sojae Thanh, Hien, Yaguchi, J.P. Samp. & Lachance ex Denchev & T. Denchev (2021)
- Moniliella spathulata (de Hoog) C.A. Rosa & Lachance (2009)(formerly in Trichosporonoides)
- Moniliella tomentosa (J.F.H. Beyma) Stolk (1966), an osmophile

Former species;

- M. mellis (Fabian & Quinet) G.V. Rao & de Hoog (1975) = Zygosaccharomyces mellis, Saccharomycetaceae
- M. suaveolens (Lindner) Arx (1972) = Vanrija humicola, Trichosporonaceae
- M. suaveolens var. nigra (Burri & W. Staub) de Hoog (1979) = Saprochaete suaveolens, Dipodascaceae
- M. tomentosa var. pollinis Hennebert & Veracht. (1971) = Moniliella pollinis, Moniliellaceae
