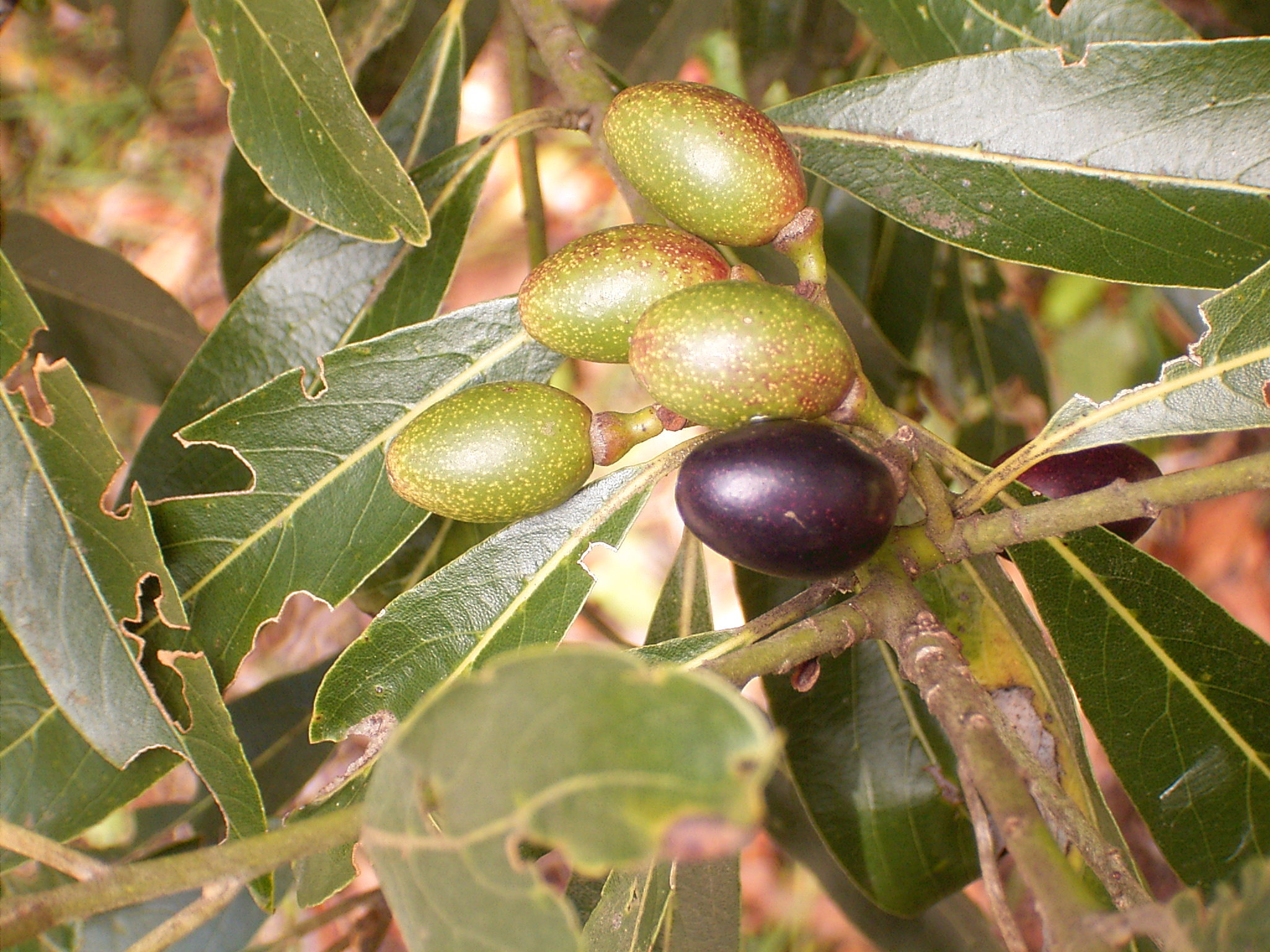

Conservation status
- Least Concern (IUCN 3.1)

Scientific classification
- Kingdom: Plantae
- Clade: Embryophytes
- Clade: Tracheophytes
- Clade: Angiosperms
- Clade: Magnoliids
- Order: Laurales
- Family: Lauraceae
- Genus: Laurus
- Species: L. novocanariensis

Binomial name
- Laurus novocanariensis Rivas Mart., Lousâ, Fern.Prieto, E.Díaz, J.C.Costa & C.Aguiar

Synonyms
- Laurus azorica var. longifolia (Kuntze) G.Kunkel (1975); Laurus canariensis Webb & Berthel. (1844), nom. illeg.; Laurus canariensis var. longifolia Kuntze (1891)

= Laurus novocanariensis =

Species of flowering plant in the laurel family

Laurus novocanariensis is a large shrub or tree with aromatic, shiny dark-green foliage. belonging to the evergreen tree genus Laurus of the laurel family, Lauraceae. The genus includes three species, whose diagnostic key characters often overlap. Under favorable conditions it is an impressive tree of 3 to 20 m (9.8 to 65.6 ft). tall. It is native of rich soils in the cloud zone of always moist spots in subtropical climate with a high air-humidity, on the Canary and Madeira islands.

The species was formerly included in Laurus azorica, a species that is now restricted to the Azores.

== Description ==
The laurel is dioecious (unisexual), with male and female flowers on separate plants. Locally, female individuals are named laurel and male specimens are named loro.

This is a tree with rather dense canopy, 6 to 20 m (20 to 66 ft) in height, which can be distinguished by its lanceolate leaves, which have small glands in the angle between the central vein and the lateral veins. Leaves have 5 to 17 cm (2.0 to 6.7 in) long, petiolate and alternate. Form available variables: ovate elliptic oblong lanceolate ... and leathery, deep green and glossy, more for the beam on the underside. Leaves have a much finer, very exquisite aroma in contrast to the strongly scented leaves of Laurus nobilis. The flowers are small, about 1 cm diameter, unisexual, yellowish-white, fragrant and arranged in axillary crests, born in pairs beside a leaf. It flowers from November to April. The fruit is an ovoid berry, olive-like, 1–1.5 cm, seed each, black when mature.

Easily cultivated in any humus rich, well drained soil in a sunny (winter) to partially shaded (summer) spot. Keep plants slightly drier in winter at a minimum of some 5 °C. Sow small avocado-like seeds in any humus rich, slightly moist soil. Keep at some 20 °C to 20 °C. Germination will start after some 4 to 6 weeks. Keep seedlings cooler, yet frostfree with reduced watering in winter in a sunny spot.

In the trunks of this species is common to find the gall, resulting from the action of a fungus (Laurobasidium lauri), also known as Madrelouro.

== Distribution ==
Laurus novocanariensis is a species characteristic of the laurisilva forests of Macaronesia, but only native to the archipelagos of Madeira and the western and central Canary Islands. It is commonly associated with Apollonias barbujana and Ocotea foetens.

Until 2004 it was considered the same species as Laurus azorica, which is in danger of extinction. Though closely related to the Azorean species, it has significant genetic, morphological and physiological differences from the latter.
