= Melaniellaceae =

Scientific classification
- Kingdom: Fungi
- Division: Basidiomycota
- Family: Melaniellaceae; R. Bauer, Vánky, Begerow & Oberwinkler, 1999

Type genus
- Melaniella R. Bauer, Vánky, Begerow & Oberw. 1999

Synonyms
- Doassansioideae Azbukina & Karatygin, 1990

Family of fungi

The Melaniellaceae are a family of fungi in the division Basidiomycota and order of Doassansiales. The family contains 1 genera and 2 species. They have a distribution in south and south-east Asia.

== History ==
In 1999, mycologists using rRNA gene sequencing and morphology analysis on two known smut species on Selaginella plants, Melanotaenium oreophilum and Melanotaenium selaginellae, and the host-parasite interaction with the Doassansiales. They found the new species were different and created a new genus Melaniella and 2 new species to place them. They are highly unusual, as there are only five out of the 1200 estimated known species of smut fungus that are found on hosts that are not flowering plants. They are biotrophic (living in symbiosis) in leaves and stems of (fern-like) Selaginella species. They are also found on the genus Lycopsida plants.

== Description ==
They are lycophytes, with sori forming irregular black spots in leaves and stems, not breaking down. They have hyphae with clamp connections, exclusively intercellular, septal pore simple with membrane caps, but the haustoria is absent but specialized interaction apparatus present with non-homogenous contents. The teliospores are embedded in the host tissue, they are variable in shape and size, often polyhedral due to compression, dark brown, thick walled, smooth or tuberculate. The basidia (a spore-producing structure) is formed directly from germinating teliospores, aseptate (exobasidium type), hypha like, thin walled, usually with a cluster of 4 apical (top of apex), sterigmata. The basidiospores (a reproductive spore) are discharged actively, fusiform (spindle-like) to cylindrical, 2 celled, hyaline and germinating in turn to produce narrow cylindrical yeast-like cells.

== Genera ==
As accepted by the GBIF;

- Melaniella R.Bauer, Vánky, Begerow & Oberw., 1999
  - Melaniella oreophila (Syd.) R.Bauer, Vánky, Begerow & Oberw., 1999 (syn. Melanotaenium oreophilum Syd.)
  - Melaniella selaginellae (Henn. & E.Nyman) R.Bauer, Vánky, Begerow & Oberw., 1999 (syn. Melanotaenium selaginellae Henn. & E. Nyman)

Type species: Melaniella oreophila (Syd.) R. Bauer, Vánky, Begerow & Oberw., 1999

They have been recorded in India, Jawa, Zimbabwe and South Africa.

Melaniella selaginellae has been listed as a potential control agent for Selaginella kraussiana as it can severely reduce the growth and the reproduction abilities of the host plant.
