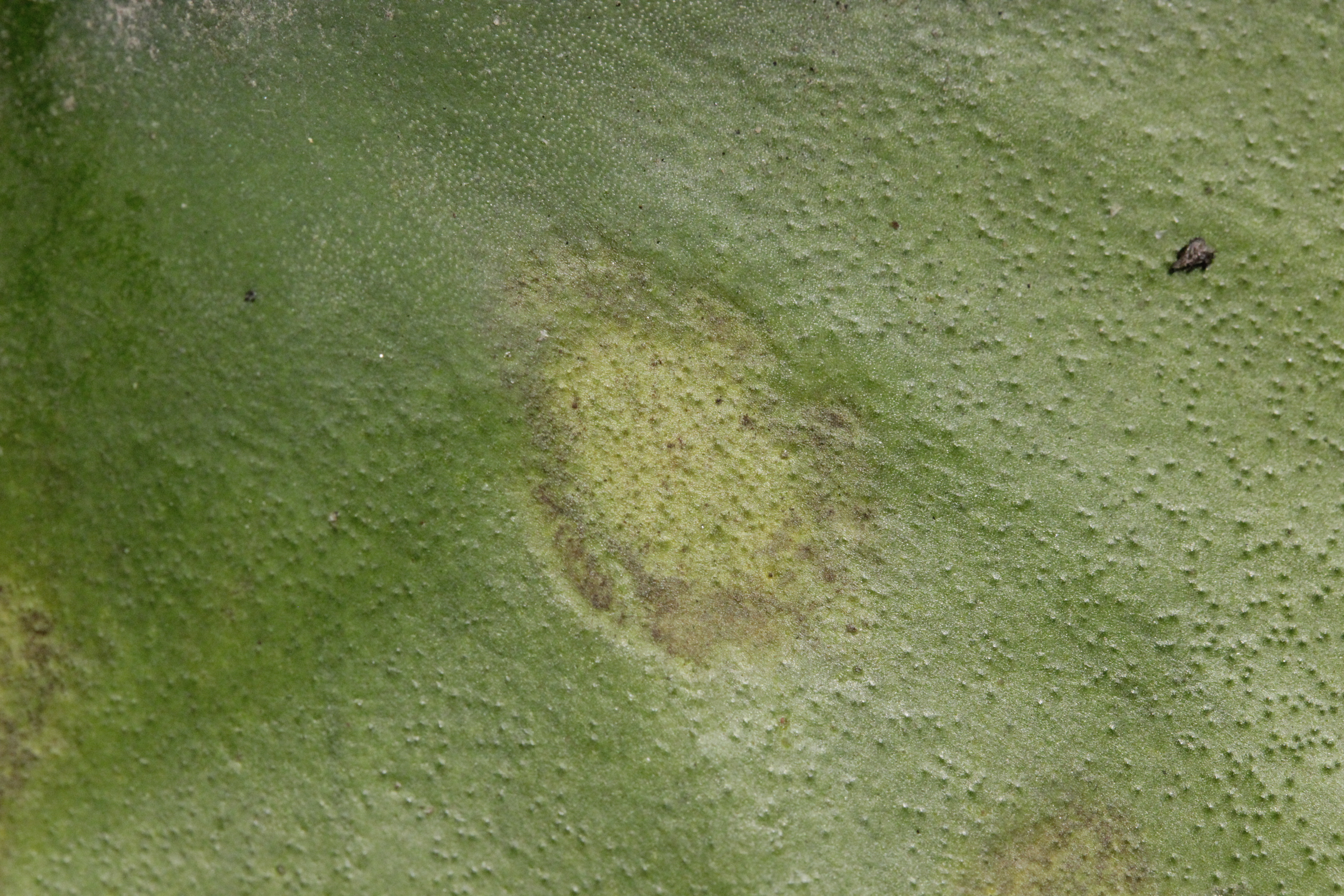
- Rhamphospora nymphaeae lesion on Nymphaea sp.

Scientific classification
- Kingdom: Fungi
- Division: Basidiomycota
- Family: Rhamphosporaceae; R. Bauer & Oberw. 1997

Type genus
- Rhamphospora D.D.Cunn., (1888)

Type species
- Rhamphospora nymphaeae

Synonyms
- Entyloma nymphaeae (D.D.Cunn.) Setch.; Entyloma nymphaeae var. macrosporum Thirum., Pavgi & Safeeulla

= Rhamphospora nymphaeae =

Species of fungi

The Rhamphosporaceae is a family of fungi in the division Basidiomycota and order of Doassansiales. The monotypic family only contains 1 genus; Rhamphospora D.D.Cunn. and just 1 species, Rhamphospora nymphaeae D.D.Cunn.

== History ==
In 1888, Surgeon Major David Douglas Cunningham MD (1843–1914, who was the Special assistant to the Sanitary Commissioner with the Government of India), was also the mycologist who originally found and described the fungus (both the genus and single species). It was found on the leaves of Nymphaea stellata, Nymphaea lotus and Nymphaea rubra, in West Bengal, India.

The genus of Rhamphospora was named after the beak or bill (of a bird Ramphocelus) known from Mexico, Costa Rica, Cuba, and Puerto Rico because of the beak-shaped appendages of its spores (Ancient greek rhamphos, rhamphos (ῥάµϕος).

The monotypic family of Rhamphosporaceae was published later, by R. Bauer & Oberw. in 1997.

It is also known and classified as a smut fungi.

== Description ==
Rhamphospora nymphaeae has sori in living leaf and stem tissues, which are scattered or gregarious and are yellowish brown or later they become reddish brown. The sori form ovoid or irregular shaped spots, about 1–7 mm long and they become larger by cell fusion.

The solitary spores, become embedded in the host tissues, they are ellipsoidal but rarely broadly ellipsoidal or subglobose in shape. They have an with an apical papilla (which is 0.5–1.5 μm high).

The hyphae is intracellular (occurring inside the cell) and the haustoria is present.

The teliospores (thick-walled resting spores) are formed individually and are usually lemon-shaped, hyaline or pale yellow, and smooth or finely verruculose (have a surface covered with tiny wart-like protuberances).

The teliospores are formed on the branches of fertile hyphae and germinating directly to form basidia (spore-producing structures). The basidia are filiform (thread-like shape), or cylindrical (in form), septate (divided into cells) with an apical cluster of 4–6 four celled fertile branches, which each give rise to 2–3 basidiospores (sexual spores).

They are produced subterminally, beaked, promycelium consisting of a long germinal tube with terminal branches bearing apical sporida.

The ramified basidiospores of Rhamphospora nymphaeae have enlarged surfaces, which could be used for dispersal in water.

== Distribution ==
It has a widespread distribution, in north temperate and neotropic zones. Including places such as (in North America); Canada (in the Provinces of British Columbia, Manitoba, Nova Scotia, Ontario and Québec), USA (in the states of Connecticut, District of Columbia, Illinois, Indiana, Iowa, Massachusetts, New York, Ohio, Oklahoma and Wisconsin). In Central America, within Costa Rica, and Cuba. In Europe, within the countries of Finland, France, Germany, Romania, Switzerland and the UK. In Asia, within Japan, Korea, China and India, and also in Australasia, within New Zealand.

== Hosts ==
Rhamphospora nymphaeae causes necrotic stem and leaf spots on members of the Nymphaeaceae family in freshwater habitats. Such as Nuphar advena (Aiton) W.T.Aiton (syn Nymphaea advena), Nymphaea alba, Nymphaea ampla, Nymphaea odorata (syn Nymphaea reniformis), Nymphaea stellata, Nymphaea tetragona, and Nymphaea tuberosa

Nymphaea tetragona was recorded as host plant of this smut fungus from Japan in 1953.
