= Cladosterigma =

Scientific classification
- Kingdom: Fungi
- Division: Ascomycota
- Class: Lecanoromycetes
- Order: Graphidales
- Family: Gomphillaceae
- Genus: Cladosterigma; Pat. (1892)
- Species: C. clavariella

Binomial name
- Cladosterigma clavariella (Speg.) Höhn. (1919)

Synonyms
- Microcera clavariella Speg. (1886); Cladosterigma fusisporum Pat. (1892)

Single-species fungal genus

Cladosterigma is a fungal genus in the family Gomphillaceae. It is monospecific, comprising the single species Cladosterigma clavariella. The fungus is a hyperparasite: it grows on living leaves of myrtle relatives (genus Eugenia) where it parasitises a plant-pathogenic fungus in the genus Phyllachora. It is known only from an asexual state that forms conspicuous, yellow, branched synnemata (bundles of spore-bearing filaments) erupting through the leaf surface.

== Taxonomy ==
The genus Cladosterigma was established by Narcisse Théophile Patouillard in 1892 with C. fusisporum from Ecuador; Carlo Luigi Spegazzini had earlier described Microcera clavariella from Paraguay on Eugenia leaves associated with Phyllachora. In 1919 Höhnel recombined Spegazzini's species as Cladosterigma clavariellum and treated it as the same species as Patouillard's taxon, leaving Cladosterigma with a single accepted species and C. fusisporum in synonymy.

For more than a century Cladosterigma was variously regarded as a basidiomycete (even compared with Clavaria) and placed among jelly fungi before later authors questioned that interpretation. Multi-locus DNA data finally resolved it as an ascomycete in the order Graphidales (family Gomphillaceae), where it represents an early-diverging lineage in a family otherwise dominated by lichen-forming fungi; within the order it is the first non-lichenicolous mycoparasitic member.

== Description ==
Cladosterigma clavariellum is known only from an asexual (anamorphic) morph. Colonies develop on the leaf surface (epiphytic) of infected hosts and are most abundant on the underside of leaves. The fungus produces closely bunched-together synnemata (gelatinous, glossy, often dichotomously branched, and "mini-Clavaria-like") that break through the epidermis. These structures are made of tightly packed conidiophores (spore-bearing filaments) whose tips are covered by a continuous layer of conidiogenous (conidia-producing) cells.

Conidiogenous cells are polyblastic (able to produce successive spores from multiple denticles). The conidia are narrowly ellipsoid to fusiform, 1–3-septate, and terminate in a distinctive "foot cell" reminiscent of some Fusarium species; the sexual morph is unknown.

== Habitat and distribution ==
The species is a hyperparasite that invades the pseudostromata and fruiting bodies of Phyllachora on living leaves of Eugenia species, erupting through the plant epidermis to form synnemata. Material examined in the modern study comes from Minas Gerais, Brazil (on Eugenia florida), while the historical types derive from Paraguay (as Microcera clavariella) and Ecuador (as C. fusisporum); together these data indicate a Neotropical distribution.

Within Graphidales, most genera are lichen-forming or lichenicolous; Cladosterigma is unusual in growing exclusively on Phyllachora rather than on lichens. It has so far been recorded on Eugenia hosts and has not been reported outside that ecological niche.
