= Robert Bauer (mycologist) =

German mycologist

- Born: 1950
- Died: 8 September 2014 (aged 63–64); Neckartailfingen
- Education: University of Tübingen
- Known for: mycology of Uredinales & Ustilaginomycetes
- Scientific career
- Fields: Mycology
- Workplaces: University of Tübingen
- Author abbrev. (botany): R.Bauer

Robert Bauer (1950 – 8 September 2014) was a German mycologist, specialising in rust (Uredinales) and smut (Ustilaginomycetes) fungi.

Bauer studied biology at the University of Tübingen during the 1970s, and a particular interest in plants and fungi led to completing his PhD there in 1983, with a doctoral dissertation entitled Experimentell-ontogenetische und karyologische Untersuchungen an Uredinales (Experimental-ontogenetic and karyological studies on Uredinales). He went on to become chair of "Systematic Botany and Mycology" (now "Evolutionary Ecology of Plants") in the "Institute of Evolution and Ecology" at Tübingen.

He became adept in the use of electron microscopes and the prerequisite specialised cutting and preparation techniques at a time when ultrastructural study of fungi was still in its infancy. He became known for detailed work on mycoparasitic fungi and the smut fungi in particular. He was able to use ultrastructural evidence to postulate phylogenies in this group before molecular techniques were developed. Subsequent molecular studies aligned with his hypotheses.

Bauer produced over 100 publications during his career, during which time he was also strongly involved in teaching, the university's botanic garden and overseeing specialist internships in electron-microscopy.

In 1999, he and Vánky, Begerow & Oberwinkler (fellow botanists), circumscribed in the journal Mycologia, Melaniellaceae which is a family of smut fungi in the division Basidiomycota.

Also in 1999 and in the journal Mycotaxon, Vánky published Bauerago Vánky 1999 and named in his honour.

Bauer died, aged 64, on 8 September 2014 in Neckartailfingen, Stuttgart.

== See also ==
- List of mycologists
