= Ceraceosorus =

Scientific classification
- Kingdom: Fungi
- Division: Basidiomycota
- Class: Exobasidiomycetes
- Order: Ceraceosorales; Begerow, M.Stoll & R.Bauer (2006)
- Family: Ceraceosoraceae; Denchev & R.T. Moore (2009)
- Genus: Ceraceosorus; B.K.Bakshi (1976)

Type species
- Ceraceosorus bombacis (B.K.Bashi) B.K.Bashi (1976)

Species
- Ceraceosorus africanus Piątek, K. Riess, Karasiński & M. Lutz; Ceraceosorus bombacis (B.K. Bakshi) B.K. Bakshi; Ceraceosorus guamensis

Genus of fungi

The Ceraceosorales are an order of smut fungi in the class Exobasidiomycetes. It is a monotypic order, consisting of a single family, the Ceraceosoraceae, which in turn contain a single genus, Ceraceosorus. Ceraceosorales was circumscribed in 2006; the family Ceraceosoraceae was validated in 2009.

Species:

- Ceraceosorus africanus Piątek, K. Riess, Karasiński & M. Lutz
- Ceraceosorus bombacis (B.K. Bakshi) B.K. Bakshi
- Ceraceosorus guamensis Kijporn. & Aime
