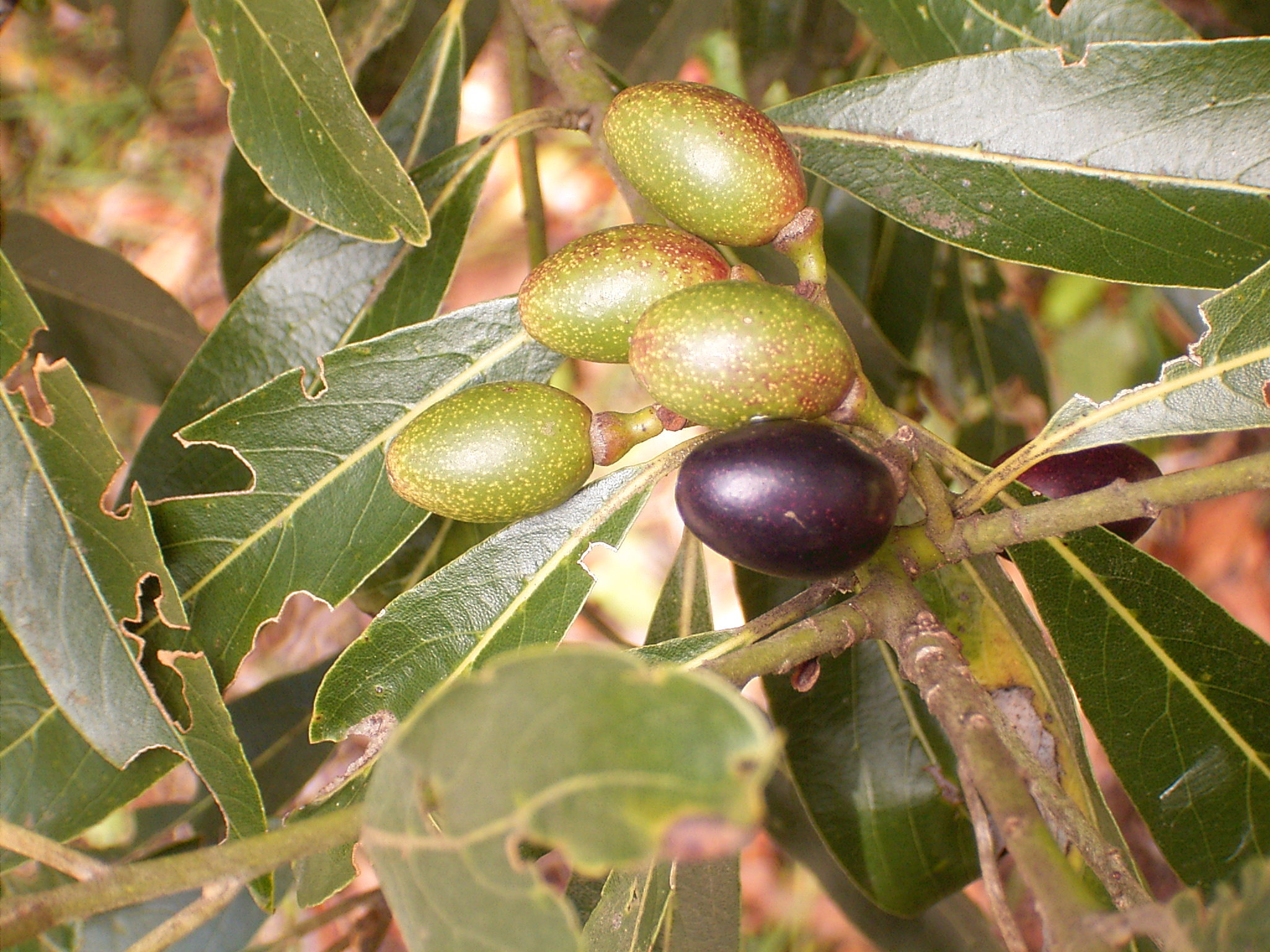
- Laurus novocanariensis

Scientific classification
- Kingdom: Plantae
- Clade: Embryophytes
- Clade: Tracheophytes
- Clade: Angiosperms
- Clade: Magnoliids
- Order: Laurales
- Family: Lauraceae
- Genus: Laurus; L. (1753)

Species
- Laurus azorica (Seub.) Franco; Laurus nobilis L.; Laurus novocanariensis Rivas Mart., Lousã, Fern.Prieto, E.Días, J.C.Costa & C.Aguiar

Synonyms
- Adaphus Neck. (1790), opus utique oppr.; Appella Adans. (1763)

= Laurus =

Genus of flowering plants in the laurel family

Laurus (/ˈlɔːrəs/) is a genus of evergreen trees or shrubs belonging to the laurel family. The genus contains three or more species, including the bay laurel or sweet bay, L. nobilis, widely cultivated as an ornamental plant and a culinary herb.

== Description ==
They are slow-growing, large, evergreen aromatic shrubs or trees with alternate, ovate leaves and insignificant yellow male and female flowers borne on separate plants (dioecious). They are frost-hardy but in temperate zones they require a sheltered spot in full sun that is not subject to prolonged freezing. Plants in pots can be moved into a cold greenhouse during the winter months.

== Species ==
The number of species in the genus has not yet been fully resolved. Three species are currently accepted:

- Laurus azorica, (Seub.) Franco – Azores laurel. Native to the Azores.
- Laurus nobilis L. – bay laurel, true laurel, or sweet bay. Native to the Mediterranean region. Used as an ornamental plant and culinary herb (one type of bay leaf) used in Mediterranean style dishes. It was also the original source of the laurel wreath of ancient Greece.
- Laurus novocanariensis Rivas Mart., Lousã, Fern.Prieto, E.Días, J.C.Costa & C.Aguiar – native to Madeira and the Canary Islands. Formerly included in L. azorica.

== Fossil history ==
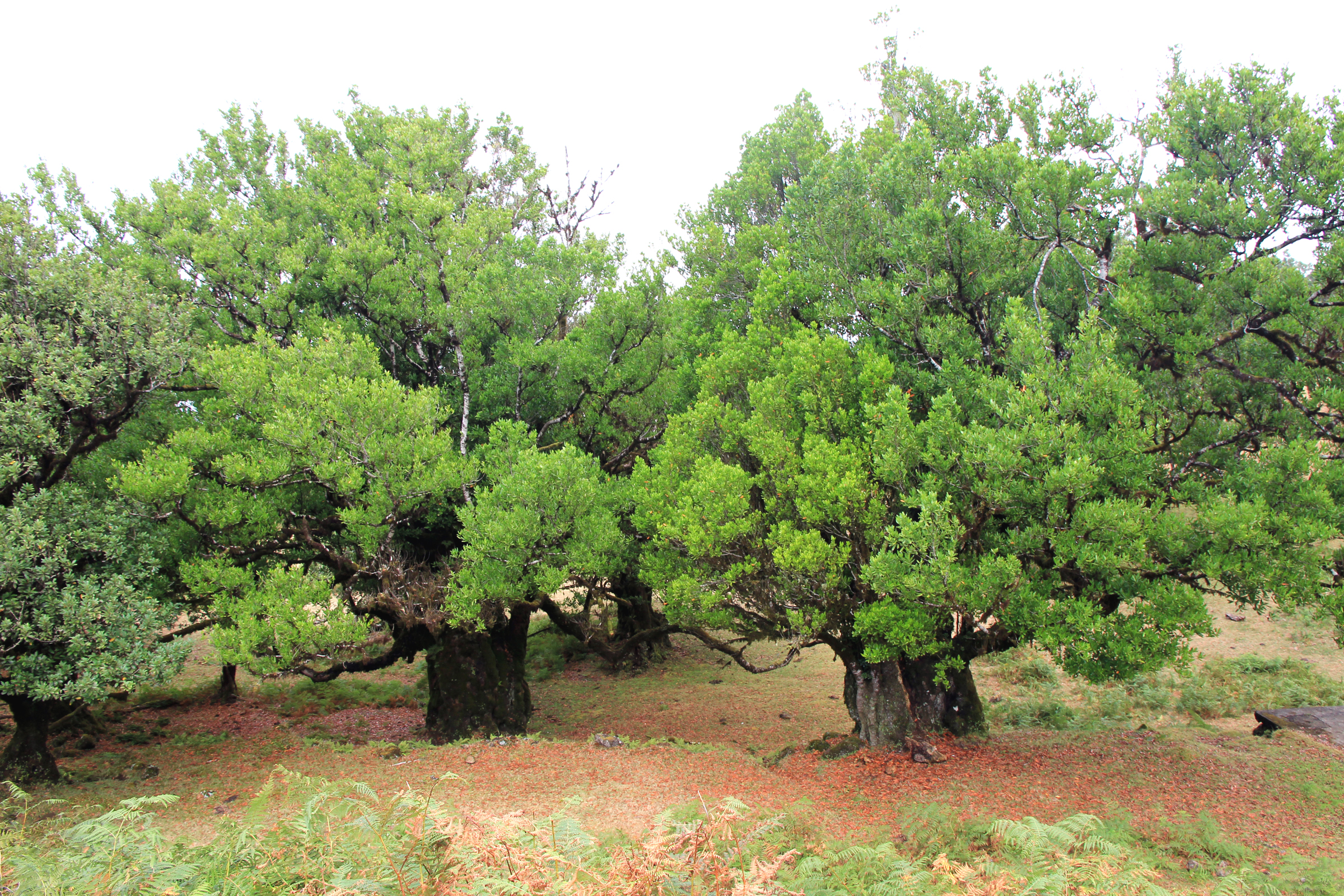
Very old laurel trees on Madeira island

Fossils dating from before the Pleistocene glaciations show that laurel forests containing species of Laurus were formerly distributed more widely around the Mediterranean and North Africa, when the climate was more humid and mild than at present. It is currently thought that the drying of the Mediterranean basin during the glaciations caused Laurus to retreat to the mildest climate refuges, including southern Spain, Portugal and the Macaronesian islands. With the end of the last glacial period, L. nobilis recovered some of its former range around the Mediterranean.
