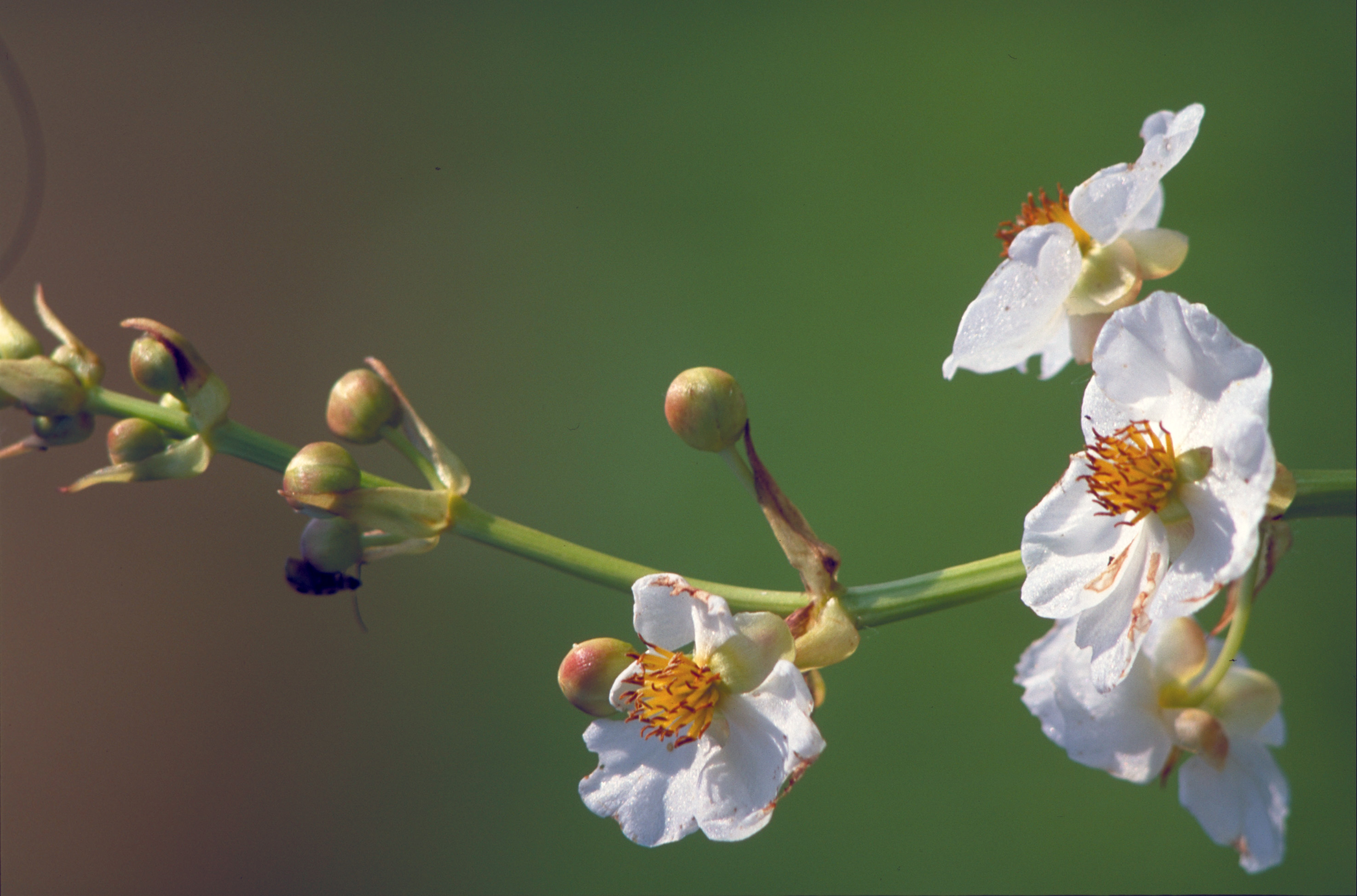

Scientific classification
- Kingdom: Plantae
- Clade: Tracheophytes
- Clade: Angiosperms
- Clade: Monocots
- Order: Alismatales
- Family: Alismataceae
- Genus: Sagittaria
- Species: S. lancifolia

Binomial name
- Sagittaria lancifolia L.

Synonyms
- Drepachenia lancifolia (L.) Raf.; Sagittaria acutifolia L.f.; Sagittaria angustifolia Lindl.; Sagittaria lancifolia var. angustifolia (Lindl.) Griseb.; Sagittaria lancifolia var. major Micheli; Sagittaria ovata Delile; Sagittaria pugioniformis L.; Sagittaria pugioniformis var. acutifolia (L.f.) Kuntze; Sagittaria sellowiana Kunth; Sagittaria trachysepala Engelm. ex M.Michel

= Sagittaria lancifolia =

Species of aquatic plant

Sagittaria lancifolia, the bulltongue arrowhead, is a New World perennial, monocot plant in the family Alismataceae, genus Sagittaria, with herbaceous growth patterns.

A common name is "duck potato" because of the large potato-like corms which can form underground.

== Description ==
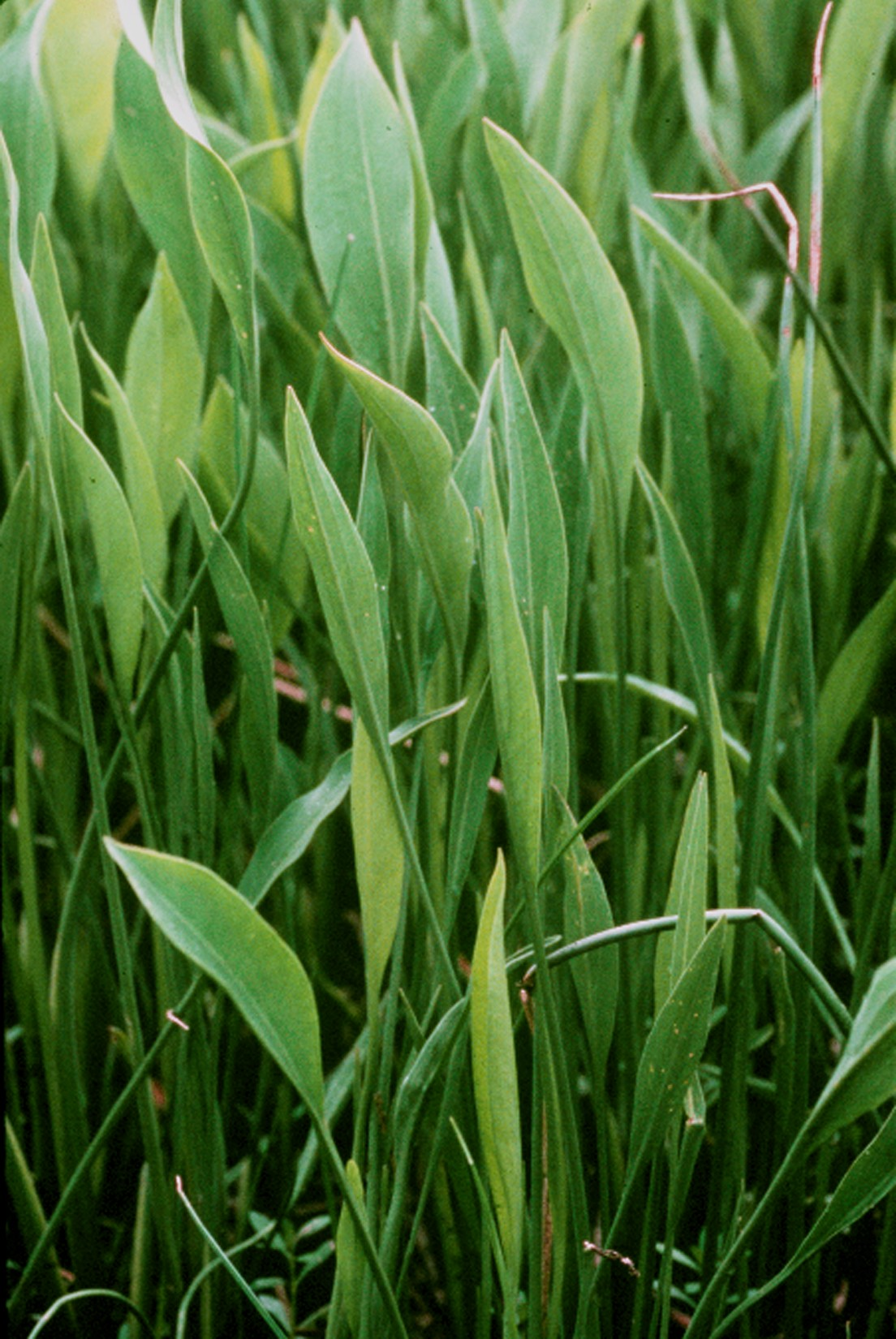
Sagittaria lancifolia L.

The plant is conspicuous for its large, lance-shaped leaves which grow up from underground rhizomes and its showy, white three-petaled flowers which form at the end of long, thick stalks. Each flower has three green sepals, three white or pink-tinged petals, at least six stamens, and pistils which may be in separate flowers. The plant likes to grow in fresh or brackish water and is commonly found in ditches, marshes, swamps and along the shores of lakes and streams.

Sagittaria lancifolia reproduces both asexually through spreading rhizomes and sexually through reproduction of copious achenes, a dry fruit each of which carries a single seed. The achenes are dispersed through animal vectors and through hydrochory (dispersal through wind, water, or gravity). The achenes germinate only under light, and with or without available fluid, but the period of their germination is shorter when they are submersed in water. Temperature is a factor, with 100% germination occurring at 20 °C (68 °F). Germination is reduced in anaerobic conditions. Growth is also dependent on temperature.

== Distribution and habitat ==
The species is native to the southeastern United States. It is known from every coastal state from Delaware to Texas. It is also considered native to Mexico, Central America, the West Indies and northern South America. It has become naturalized on the Island of Java in Indonesia.

== Sensitivity to in-situ burning of applied crude oil ==
Louisiana is one of the top five U.S. states in oil production, oil that is piped through marshes in Louisiana to market and sometimes leaks into the marsh land polluting it. Field studies suggest that, although the application and burning of South Louisiana Crude oil on Sagittaria l. plants in plots of fresh Louisiana marsh land had short term negative effects on the growth rate of Sagittaria l., over time plant recovery was just as rapid as in the plots where the plants were oiled but not burned. This suggests that allowing a polluted marsh to degrade and recover without burning is a viable option, while burning is a viable option when a rapid recovery is needed on sensitive lands.
