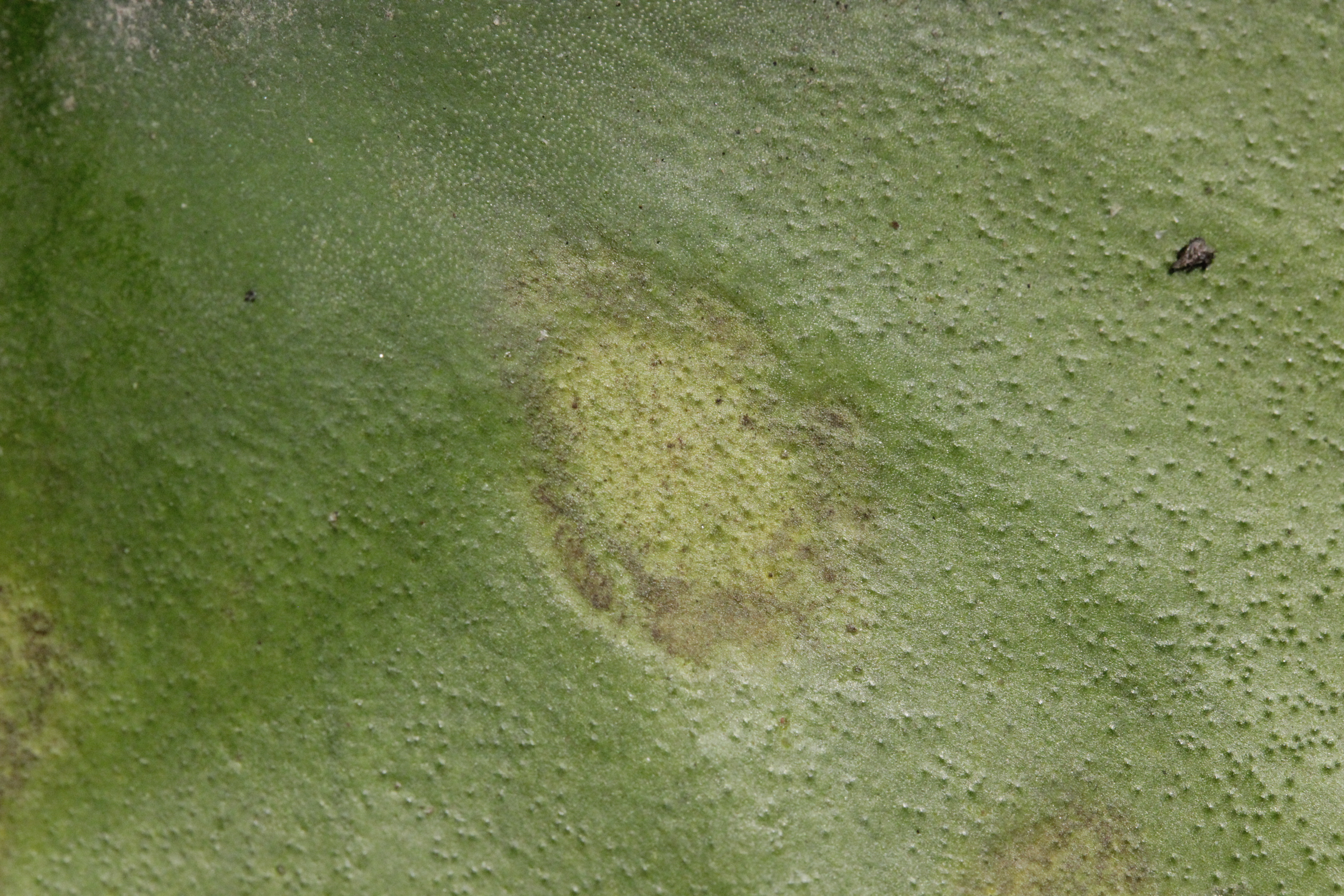
- Rhamphospora nymphaeae

Scientific classification
- Kingdom: Fungi
- Division: Basidiomycota
- Class: Exobasidiomycetes
- Order: Doassansiales; R. Bauer & Oberw.

Families
- Doassansiaceae; Melaniellaceae; Rhamphosporaceae

= Doassansiales =

Order of fungi

The Doassansiales are an order of fungi in the class Exobasidiomycetes. The order consist of three families: the Doassansiaceae, the Melaniellaceae, and the Rhamphosporaceae (which is a monotypic family with a monotypic genus, with one species; Rhamphospora nymphaeae D.D.Cunn).
