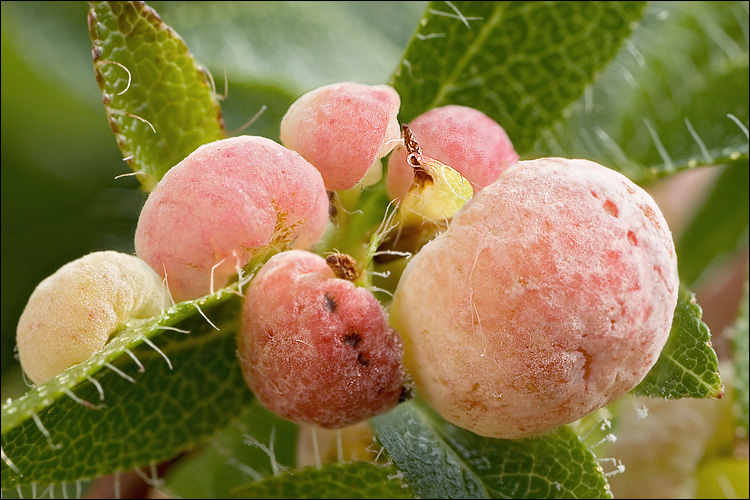
- Exobasidium rhododendri parasitizing Rhododendron hirsutum

Scientific classification
- Kingdom: Fungi
- Division: Basidiomycota
- Class: Exobasidiomycetes
- Order: Exobasidiales
- Family: Exobasidiaceae; J. Schröt.

Type genus
- Exobasidium Woronin

Genera
- Austrobasidium; Endobasidium; Exobasidium; Laurobasidium; Muribasidiospora

= Exobasidiaceae =

Family of fungi

The Exobasidiaceae are a family of fungi in the division Basidiomycota, order Exobasidiales. The family contains 5 genera and 56 species. Species in the family have a widespread distribution, especially in temperate areas. Members of the Exobasidiaceae are plant pathogens that grow on the leaves of plants, especially those in the family Ericaceae.
