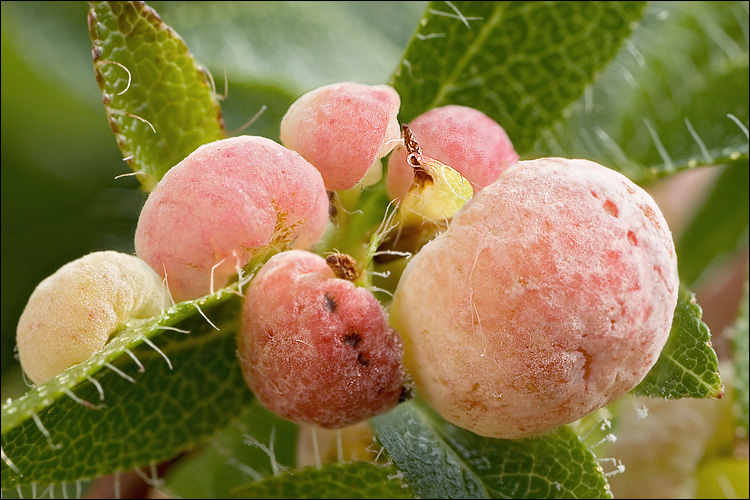
- Exobasidium rhododendri parasitizing Rhododendron hirsutum

Scientific classification
- Kingdom: Fungi
- Division: Basidiomycota
- Class: Exobasidiomycetes
- Order: Exobasidiales; Henn. (1898)

Families
- Brachybasidiaceae; Cryptobasidiaceae; Exobasidiaceae; Graphiolaceae; Genus not assigned to a family: Cladosterigma

= Exobasidiales =

Order of fungi

The Exobasidiales are an order of fungi in the class Exobasidiomycetes. The order consists of four families as well as one genus, Cladosterigma, not assigned to any family.
