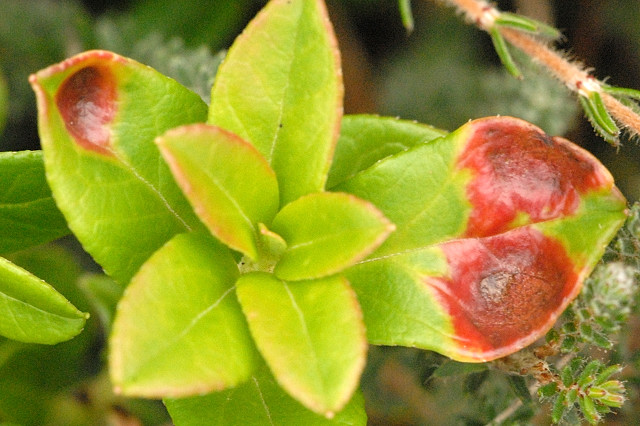
- Exobasidium vaccinii

Scientific classification
- Kingdom: Fungi
- Division: Basidiomycota
- Subdivision: Ustilaginomycotina
- Class: Exobasidiomycetes; Begerow, Stoll & R.Bauer (2007)

Orders
- Ceraceosorales; Doassansiales; Entylomatales; Exobasidiales; Georgefischeriales; Malasseziales; Microstromatales; Tilletiales

= Exobasidiomycetes =

Class of fungi

The Exobasidiomycetes are a class of fungi sometimes associated with the abnormal outgrowths of plant tissues known as galls. The class includes Exobasidium camelliae Shirai, the camellia leaf gall and Exobasidium vaccinii Erikss, the leaf and flower gall.

There are seven orders in the Exobasidiomycetes, including the Ceraceosorales, Doassansiales, Entylomatales, Exobasidiales, Georgefischeriales, Microstromatales and the Tilletiales. Four of the seven orders include smut fungi. The family Ceraceosoraceae was formally validated in 2009 for the order Ceraceosorales. Malasseziales was once considered to be a part of the Exobasidiomycetes class but is now considered to be a part of its own class.
