= List of tea diseases =

Many of the diseases, pathogens and pests that affect the tea plant (Camellia sinensis) may affect other members of the plant genus Camellia.

== Bacterial diseases ==
Bacterial diseases
Bacterial canker	Xanthomonas campestris pv. theicola Xanthomonas gorlencovianum
Bacterial shoot blight	Pseudomonas avellanae pv. theae
Crown gall	Agrobacterium tumefaciens

== Fungal diseases ==
Fungal diseases
Anthracnose	Colletotrichum theae-sinensis = Gloeosporium theae-sinensis Colletotrichum acutatum
Armillaria root rot	Armillaria mellea = Armillariella mellea Armillaria heimii = Armillaria fuscipes
Bird's eye spot	Cercoseptoria ocellata = Cercospora theae Pseudocercospora theae = Septoria theae = Cercoseptoria theae
Black blight	Cylindrocladium lanceolatum
Black root rot	Rosellinia arcuata Rosellinia bunodes = Rosellinia bunoides
Black rot	Ceratobasidium sp. Corticium invisum Corticium theae
Blister blight	Exobasidium vexans
Botryodiplodia root rot	Lasiodiplodia theobromae = Botryodiplodia theobromae
Brown blight	Glomerella cingulata Colletotrichum gloeosporioides [anamorph] = Colletotrichum camelliae
Brown root rot	Phellinus noxius = Fomes noxius
Brown spot	Calonectria colhounii Cylindrocladium colhounii [anamorph]
Brown zonate leaf blight	Ceuthospora lauri
Bud blight	Phoma theicola
Charcoal stump rot	Ustulina deusta Ustulina zonata [anamorph]
Collar and branch canker	Phomopsis theae
Collar rot	Rhizoctonia solani Thanatephorus cucumeris [teleomorph]
Copper blight	Guignardia camelliae
Damping-off	Cylindrocladium floridanum Calonectria kyotensis [teleomorph] Hypochnus centrifugus
Dieback	Leptothyrium theae Nectria cinnabarina
Gray blight	Pestalotiopsis theae = Pestalotia theae Pestalotiopsis longiseta = Pestalotia longiseta Pseudopestalotiopsis theae
Gray mold	Botrytis cinerea
Gray spot	Phyllosticta dusana
Horse-hair blight	Marasmius crinis-equi = Marasmius equicrinis
Leaf spot	Calonectria pyrochroa = Calonectria quinqueseptata Cylindrocladium ilicicola [anamorph] Calonectria theae Cylindrocladium theae [anamorph] Cochliobolus carbonum Hendersonia theicola Pestalotiopsis adusta Phaeosphaerella theae Pleospora theae
Leaf scab	Elsinoë theae
Macrophoma stem canker	Macrophoma theicola = Macrophoma theiocola Botryosphaeria dothidea Botryosphaeria mamane Fusarium solani
Net blister blight	Exobasidium reticulatum
Pale brown root rot	Pseudophaeolus baudonii
Phloem necrosis	Phloem necrosis virus (Camellia Virus 1)
Phyllosticta leaf spot	Phyllosticta erratica Phyllosticta theae
Pink disease	Corticium salmonicolor
Poria root rot and stem canker	Poria hypobrunnea
Purple root rot	Helicobasidium compactum
Red leaf spot	Phoma theicola
Red root rot	Ganoderma philippii Poria hypolateritia = Ceriporiopsis hypolateritia
Red rust (alga)	Cephaleuros virescens = Cephaleuros parasiticus
Rim blight	Cladosporium sp.
Root rot	Cylindrocarpon tenue Cylindrocladiella camelliae = Cylindrocladium camelliae Cylindrocladium clavatum Fomes lamaënsis Ganoderma applanatum Ganoderma lucidum
Rough bark	Patellaria theae
Sclerotial blight	Sclerotium rolfsii Athelia rolfsii [teleomorph] = Corticium rolfsii
Shoot withering	Diplodia theae-sinensis
Sooty mold	Capnodium footii Capnodium theae Meliola camelliae
Stump rot	Irpex destruens
Tarry root rot	Hypoxylon asarcodes
Thorny stem blight	Tunstallia aculeata
Thread blight	Marasmius tenuissimus
Twig blight	Patellaria theae
Twig dieback, stem canker	Macrophoma theicola
Velvet blight	Septobasidium bogoriense Septobasidium pilosum Septobasidium theae
Violet root rot	Sphaerostilbe repens
White root rot	Rigidoporus microporus = Rigidoporus lignosus = Fomes lignosus
White scab	Elsinoe leucospila = Sphaceloma theae
White spot	Phyllosticta theifolia
Wood rot	Hypoxylon nummularium Hypoxylon serpens Hypoxylon vestitum
Xylaria root rot	Xylaria sp.

== Nematodes, parasitic ==
Nematodes, parasitic
Burrowing nematode	Radopholus similis
Dagger nematode	Xiphinema insigne
Lance nematode	Hoplolaimus columbus
Mature tea nematode	Meloidogyne brevicauda
Pin nematode	Paratylenchus curvitatus
Reniform nematode	Rotylenchulus reniformis
Root-knot nematode	Meloidogyne arenaria Meloidogyne hapla Meloidogyne incognita Meloidogyne javanica Meloidogyne thamesi
Root lesion nematode	Pratylenchus brachyurus Pratylenchus loosi
Sheath nematode	Hemicriconemoides kanayaensis
Spiral nematode	Helicotylenchus dihystera Helicotylenchus erythrinae
Stunt nematode	Tylenchorhynchus sp.

== Lepidoptera (butterflies and moth) pests ==
Lepidoptera (butterflies and moth) pests
Case-bearer species	Coleophora scaleuta
Case-bearer species	Coleophora vigilis
Ghost moth species	Endoclita malabaricus
Ghost moth species	Endoclita punctimargo
Ghost moth species	Endoclita purpurescens
Ghost moth species	Endoclita sericeus
Willow beauty	Peribatodes rhomboidaria
