= Pseudopestalotiopsis =

Scientific classification
- Kingdom: Fungi
- Division: Ascomycota
- Class: Sordariomycetes
- Order: Amphisphaeriales
- Family: Sporocadaceae
- Genus: Pseudopestalotiopsis; Maharachchikumbura et al. (2014)

Type species
- Pseudopestalotiopsis theae (Sawada) Maharachch., K.D. Hyde & Crous

Genus of fungi

Pseudopestalotiopsis is a genus of plant pathogens in the family Sporocadaceae.

The genus was published by Maharachch., K.D. Hyde & Crous in Studies in Mycology vol. 79 on page 135 in 2014. The type species is Pseudopestalotiopsis theae (Sawada) Maharachch., K.D. Hyde & Crous.

It was named after its morphological similarity to Pestalotiopsis.

Pseudopestalotiopsis species are widely distributed as saprobes or pathogens, mainly occurring on leaves (Maharachchikumbura et al. 2014b, 2016a). They have conidia with concolorous (or uniform in colour), brown to dark brown or olivaceous (olive-green colour) median pigmented cells (Maharachchikumbura et al. 2014b). They also have knobbed apical appendages.

It was originally placed in family Pestalotiopsidaceae before that was absorbed into the family Sporocadaceae. Jaklitsch et al. (2016), synonymised Bartaliniaceae, Discosiaceae, Pestalotiopsidaceae and Robillardaceae, and then revived the older family name of Sporocadaceae to accommodate them (Crous et al. 2015). Pestalotiopsidaceae is still sometimes used.

Some Pseudopestalotiopsis fungal species are well known for their capability to produce medicinal compounds that could have medicinal, agricultural and industrial applications.

DNA research in 2020 into 172 specimens (collected worldwide) of various species of Pestalotiopsis and related genera, including Neopestalotiopsis and Pseudopestalotiopsis eventually revealed that Yunnan or Jiangxi (in China) was a possible centre of origin for the genus, and that genera Pseudopestalotiopsis and Neopestalotiopsis could have originally derived from genera Pestalotiopsis.

Molecular diagnosis is increasingly being used to identify rare species of pathogenic fungi.

Despite being a common pathogen in plants, fungal infections in humans and animals is extremely rare. There had previously been no reports of Pseudopestalotiopsis infections in humans. A single report of Pestalotiopsis clavispora keratitis was reported from Japan in a gardener after sweeping up leaves and twigs. Then in 2019 in a rural part of India, a 55 year old woman was treated in hospital for Pseudopestalotiopsis keratitis (a fungal infection within the cornea of the eye) causing pain, redness, and decreased vision in the right eye. It was discovered using DNA sequencing to be Pseudopestalotiopsis theae. Scarring on the cornea meant the patient never regained full sight but recovered enough to leave hospital.

== Hosts ==
Pestalotiopsis and related genera, including Neopestalotiopsis and Pseudopestalotiopsis have damaged many plants for many decades.

In 2018, in Taiwan, during a fungal study it was found that species Pseudopestalotiopsis ixorae and Pseudopestalotiopsis taiwanensis caused leaf spots on species of Ixora, which is one of the largest genera in the family Rubiaceae and a popular garden plant in Taiwan.

In 2021, it was found that fungal pathogens, Pseudopestalotiopsis gilvanii sp. nov. and Neopestalotiopsis formicarum both cause spots on the leaves of the guarana plant (cupana var. sorbilis) in the Amazon forest of Brazil. Pseudopestalotiopsis gilvanii was also pathogenic to açaí palms (Euterpe oleracea and Euterpe precatoria), and the oil palm (Elaeis guineensis), but not to banana (Musa paradisiaca var. pacovan) and rubber trees (Hevea brasiliensis).

Two coelomycetous fungal strains with appendage-bearing conidia were collected from diseased leaves of Celtis sinensis (Urticales, Ulmaceae family) and also Indocalamus tessellatus (Poales, Poaceae family) in Yunnan and Hainan provinces of southern China. Both fungal strains produced 4-septate conidia with concolorous median cells, which were similar to Pestalotiopsis and Pseudopestalotiopsis. But later morphological comparison and DNA testing revealed that they were new to science and then labelled as Pseudopestalotiopsis celtidis and Pseudopestalotiopsis indocalami.

On Camellia sinensis (the tea tree), species from three genera (Pseudopestalotiopsis camelliae-sinensis, Neopestalotiopsis clavispora and Pestalotiopsis camelliae) have been associated with gray blight symptoms (Chen et al. 2018). Species Pseudopestalotiopsis theae (Sawada) Maharachch., K.D. Hyde & Crous is also known to cause Gray Tea Blight on tea tree plants. It damages production and alters the quality of the tea produced. It mainly infects mature and old plant foliage and can also infect young shoots. Under conditions of high temperature and high humidity it can lead to defoliation of the plants. It was first found in 1973 in Kagoshima, Japan and was originally called 'zonate leaf spot' (Takaya 1978). and published as Pestalotiopsis theae. When the genus Pseudopestalotiopsis was created in 2014, it was transferred to the genus as well. Pseudopestalotiopsis theae is also found in India and China, while a similar blight causing fungus Pestalotiopsis longiseta (within the same family) is only found in Japan. In Taiwan, species Pseudopestalotiopsis annellata, Pseudopestalotiopsis chinensis, Pseudopestalotiopsis camelliae-sinensis, Pestalotiopsis camelliae, Pestalotiopsis yanglingensis and Pestalotiopsis trachicarpicola have been found causing Gray blight disease on Camellia sinensis plants.

== Distribution ==
It has a scattered distribution, found in Central America, South America (including Brazil,), Europe (including Turkey and France,) Africa, Asia, (including Thailand, India, Myanmar, Taiwan, and China, ) Australia and New Zealand.

== Species ==
The genus Pseudopestalotiopsis comprised only seven species in 2017: Pseudopestalotiopsis camelliae, Pseudopestalotiopsis cocos, Pseudopestalotiopsis ignota, Pseudopestalotiopsis indica, Pseudopestalotiopsis kubahensis, Pseudopestalotiopsis simitheae, and Pseudopestalotiopsis theae. Pseudopestalotiopsis kubahensis had been found in 2015 in Malaysia. While surveying Pseudopestalotiopsis fungi in Vietnam during 2013 and then in Myanmar during 2015, 2 new species were found and published. They were then named as Pseudopestalotiopsis myanmarina and Pseudopestalotiopsis vietnamensis. Species Pseudopestalotiopsis dawaina and Pseudopestalotiopsis kawthaungina were found in 2018 in Myanmar within a tropical forest.

Up to 2022, 15 taxa of Pseudopestalotiopsis were known. But more have been added since. Below is species list as accepted by Species Fungorum;

- Pseudopestalotiopsis ampullacea F. Liu & L. Cai (2017)
- Pseudopestalotiopsis avicenniae Norphanphoun, T.C. Wen & K.D. Hyde (2020)
- Pseudopestalotiopsis camelliae-sinensis F. Liu & L. Cai (2017)
- Pseudopestalotiopsis chinensis F. Liu & L. Cai (2017)
- Pseudopestalotiopsis cocos Maharachch., K.D. Hyde & Crous (2014)
- Pseudopestalotiopsis curvatispora Norphanphoun, T.C. Wen & K.D. Hyde (2020)
- Pseudopestalotiopsis dawaina Nozawa & Kyoko Watan. (2018)
- Pseudopestalotiopsis elaeidis (C. Booth & J.S. Robertson) F. Liu, L. Cai & Crous (2018)
- Pseudopestalotiopsis gilvanii G.F. Silva, G.F. Gualberto, A.M. Catarino & T.S. Fernandes (2021)
- Pseudopestalotiopsis ignota Maharachch., L.D. Guo & K.D. Hyde (2016)
- Pseudopestalotiopsis indica Maharachch., K.D. Hyde & Crous (2014)
- Pseudopestalotiopsis ixorae I. Tsai, Maharachch. & Ariyawansa (2018)
- Pseudopestalotiopsis kawthaungina Nozawa & Kyoko Watan. (2018)
- Pseudopestalotiopsis kubahensis Lateef, M. Sepiah & Bolhassan (2014)
- Pseudopestalotiopsis myanmarina Shuns. Nozawa & K. Watan. (2017)
- Pseudopestalotiopsis rhizophorae Norphanphoun, T.C. Wen & K.D. Hyde (2020)
- Pseudopestalotiopsis simitheae (Yu Song, Tangthir., K.D. Hyde & Y. Wang) Maharachch. & K.D. Hyde (2016)
- Pseudopestalotiopsis solicola F. Liu, L. Cai & Crous (2018)
- Pseudopestalotiopsis taiwanensis I. Tsai, Maharachch. & Ariyawansa (2018)
- Pseudopestalotiopsis thailandica Norphanphoun & K.D. Hyde (2020)
- Pseudopestalotiopsis theae (Sawada) Maharachch., K.D. Hyde & Crous (2014)
- Pseudopestalotiopsis vietnamensis Shuns. Nozawa & K. Watan. (2017)
