= A. arenarius =

A. arenarius may refer to:

An abbreviation of a species name. In binomial nomenclature the name of a species is always the name of the genus to which the species belongs, followed by the species name (also called the species epithet). In A. arenarius the genus name has been abbreviated to A. and the species has been spelled out in full. In a document that uses this abbreviation it should always be clear from the context which genus name has been abbreviated.

Some of the most common uses of A. arenarius are:

- Actinostrobus arenarius, the sandplain cypress, a conifer species found only in Western Australia
- Agrotis arenarius, a moth species endemic to Sable Island, Nova Scotia

== See also ==
- Arenarius (disambiguation)
