= S. arenarius =

S. arenarius may refer to:

- Spalax arenarius, the sandy mole-rat, a rodent species endemic to Ukraine
- Spalerosophis arenarius, the red spotted royal snake or red-spotted diadem snake, a snake species found in India and Pakistan

== See also ==
- Arenarius (disambiguation)
