= E. arenarius =

E. arenarius may refer to:

- Elymus arenarius, a synonym for Leymus arenarius, a grass species native to Europe and the coldest shores of North America
- Eresus arenarius, a synonym for Stegodyphus lineatus, a spider species found in Europe

== See also ==
- Arenarius (disambiguation)
