= T. arenarius =

T. arenarius may refer to:

- Taterillus arenarius, the Robbins's tateril or Sahel gerbil, a rodent species found only in Mauritania
- Triaeniopholis arenarius, a synonym for Lampropeltis getula, the eastern kingsnake, common kingsnake or chain kingsnake, a harmless colubrid species found in the United States and Mexico

== See also ==
- Arenarius (disambiguation)
