= M. arenaria =

M. arenaria may refer to:

- Meloidogyne arenaria, a plant pathogenic nematode species
- Mya arenaria, the soft-shell clam, steamer, softshell, longneck, piss clams or Ipswich clam, an edible saltwater clam species

== Synonyms ==
- Medicago arenaria, a synonym for Medicago littoralis, a plant species found primarily in the Mediterranean basin

== See also ==
- Arenaria (disambiguation)
