= Calonectria morganii =

Scientific classification
- Domain: Eukaryota
- Kingdom: Fungi
- Division: Ascomycota
- Class: Sordariomycetes
- Order: Hypocreales
- Family: Nectriaceae
- Genus: Calonectria
- Species: C. morganii

Binomial name
- Calonectria morganii Crous, Alfenas & M.J. Wingf. 1993

Synonyms
- Cylindrocladium scoparium Morgan 1892

Species of fungus

Calonectria morganii is a species of fungus in the family Nectriaceae.
