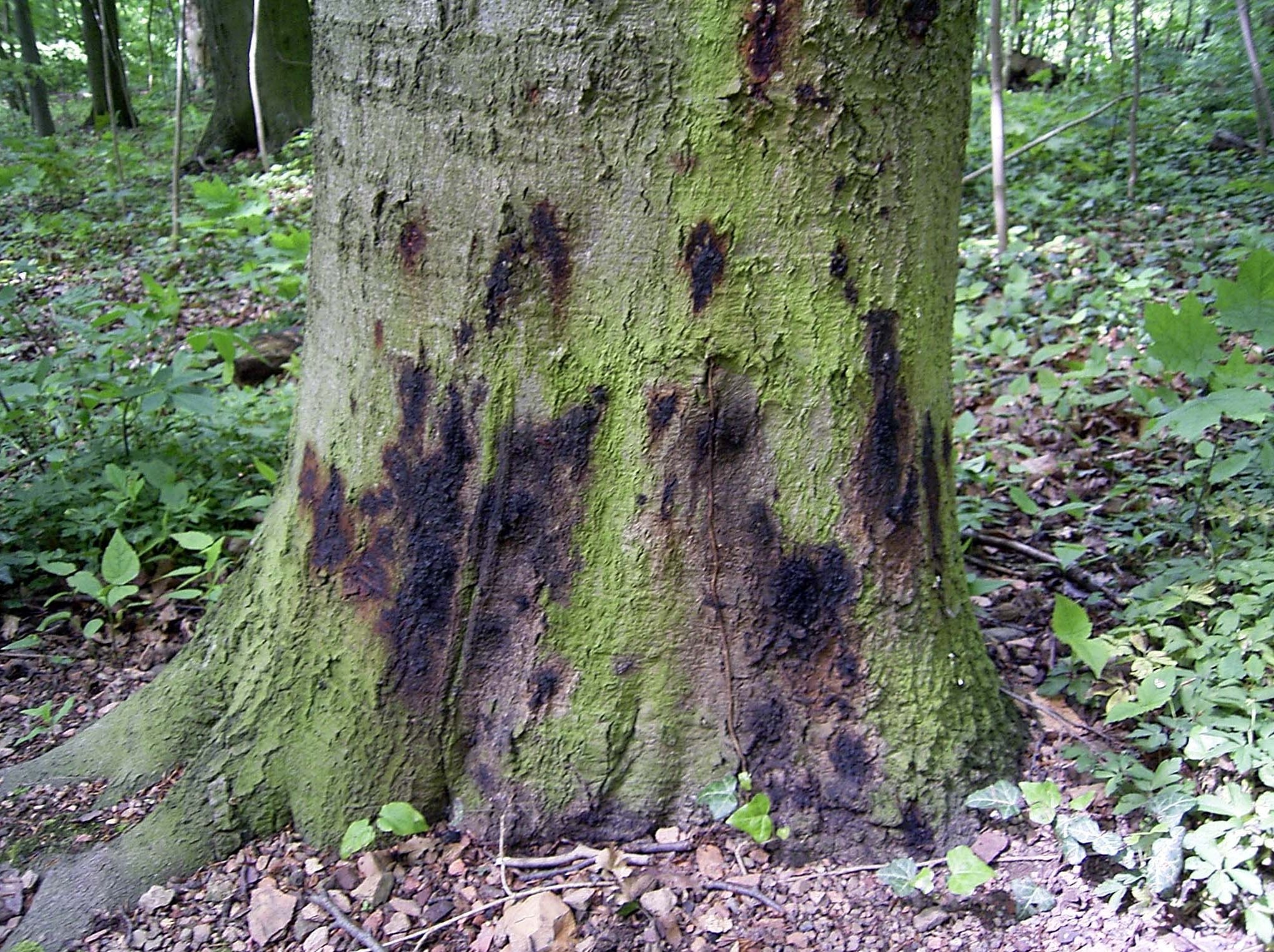
- Wood decay caused by Kretzschmaria deusta infection

Scientific classification
- Kingdom: Fungi
- Division: Ascomycota
- Class: Sordariomycetes
- Order: Xylariales
- Family: Xylariaceae
- Genus: Kretzschmaria; Fr. (1849)

Type species
- Kretzschmaria clavus (Fr.) Sacc. (1883)

Synonyms
- Ascostroma Bonord. (1851); Rhopalopsis Cooke (1883)

= Kretzschmaria =

Genus of fungi

Kretzschmaria is a genus of fungi in the family Xylariaceae. The genus, circumscribed by Swedish mycologist Elias Magnus Fries in 1849, contains about 30 species that collectively have a widespread distribution. Fossils of Kretzschmaria have been found in the 12 million year old rocks from central England.

== Species ==
- Kretzschmaria albogrisea
- Kretzschmaria argentinensis
- Kretzschmaria aspinifera
- Kretzschmaria bengalensis
- Kretzschmaria cetrarioides
- Kretzschmaria chardoniana
- Kretzschmaria clavus
- Kretzschmaria colensoi
- Kretzschmaria curvirima
- Kretzschmaria deusta
- Kretzschmaria eriodendri
- Kretzschmaria guyanensis
- Kretzschmaria knysnana
- Kretzschmaria lucidula
- Kretzschmaria macrosperma
- Kretzschmaria megalospora
- Kretzschmaria micropus
- Kretzschmaria milleri
- Kretzschmaria neocaledonica
- Kretzschmaria orientalis
- Kretzschmaria parvistroma
- Kretzschmaria pavimentosa
- Kretzschmaria phoenicis
- Kretzschmaria rehmii
- Kretzschmaria sandvicense
- Kretzschmaria sigmoidirima
- Kretzschmaria tuckeri
- Kretzschmaria varians
- Kretzschmaria verrucosa
- Kretzschmaria zelandica
- Kretzschmaria zonata
