= Pestalotiopsis disseminata =

Scientific classification
- Kingdom: Fungi
- Division: Ascomycota
- Class: Sordariomycetes
- Order: Amphisphaeriales
- Family: Sporocadaceae
- Genus: Pestalotiopsis
- Species: P. disseminata

Binomial name
- Pestalotiopsis disseminata (Thüm.) Steyaert, (1949)

Species of fungus

Pestalotiopsis disseminata is a fungal plant pathogen infecting bananas.
