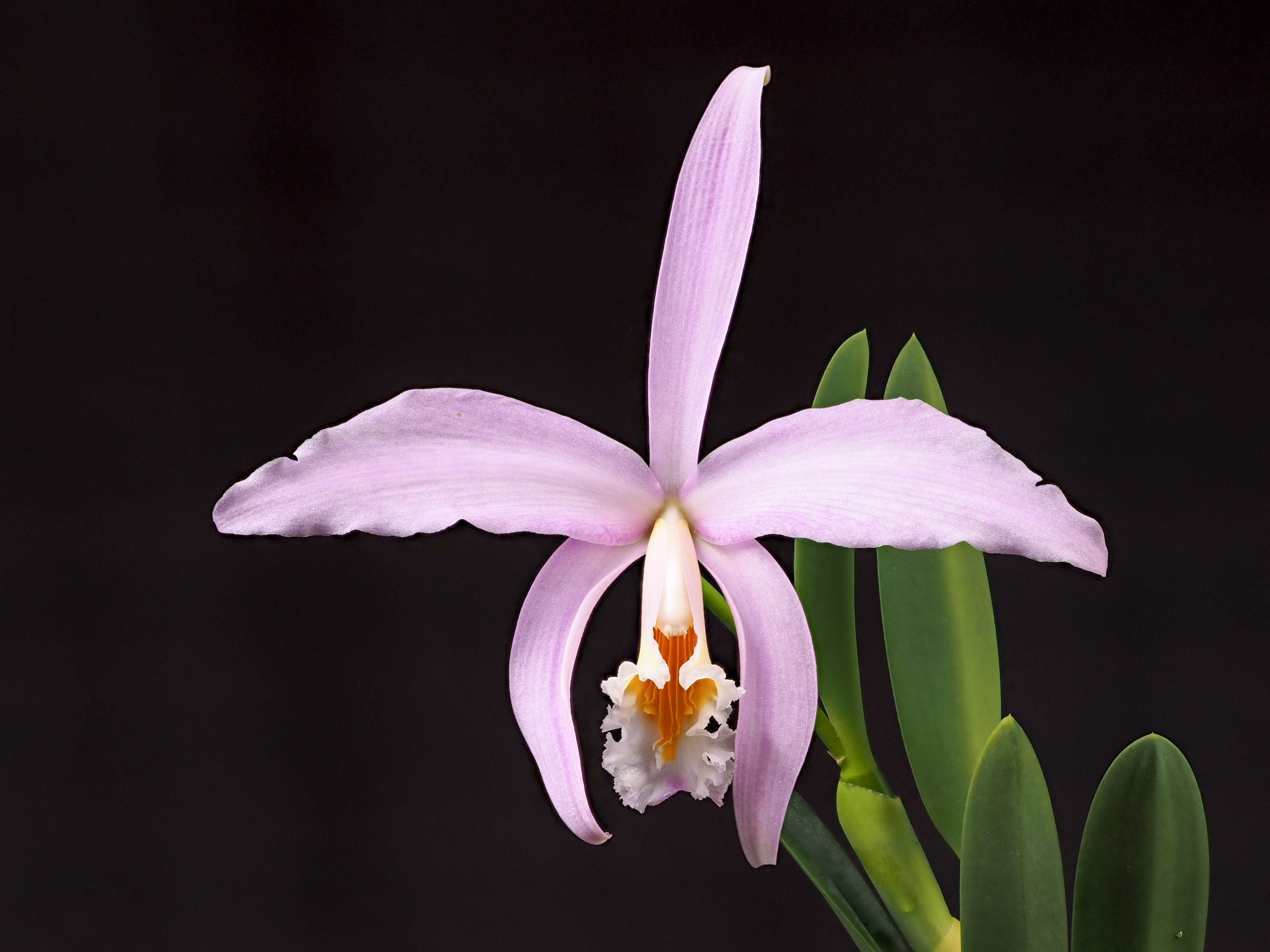
- Cattleya jongheana

Conservation status
- Vulnerable (IUCN 3.1)
- CITES Appendix I

Scientific classification
- Kingdom: Plantae
- Clade: Tracheophytes
- Clade: Angiosperms
- Clade: Monocots
- Order: Asparagales
- Family: Orchidaceae
- Subfamily: Epidendroideae
- Genus: Cattleya
- Subgenus: Cattleya subg. Cattleya
- Section: Cattleya sect. Crispae
- Species: C. jongheana

Binomial name
- Cattleya jongheana (Rchb.f.) Van den Berg

Synonyms
- Laelia jongheana Rchb.f.; Bletia jongheana (Rchb.f.) Rchb.f.; Hadrolaelia jongheana (Rchb.f.) Chiron & V.P.Castro; Sophronitis jongheana (Rchb.f.) Van den Berg & M.W.Chase

= Cattleya jongheana =

Species of orchid

Cattleya jongheana, commonly known as the Jonghe's cattleya, is a species of orchid endemic to Brazil (Minas Gerais).

Fungal plant pathogen in the family Sporocadaceae, species Neopestalotiopsis hadrolaeliae has been found growing on the roots of the endangered orchid Hadrolaelia jongheana in Brazil.
