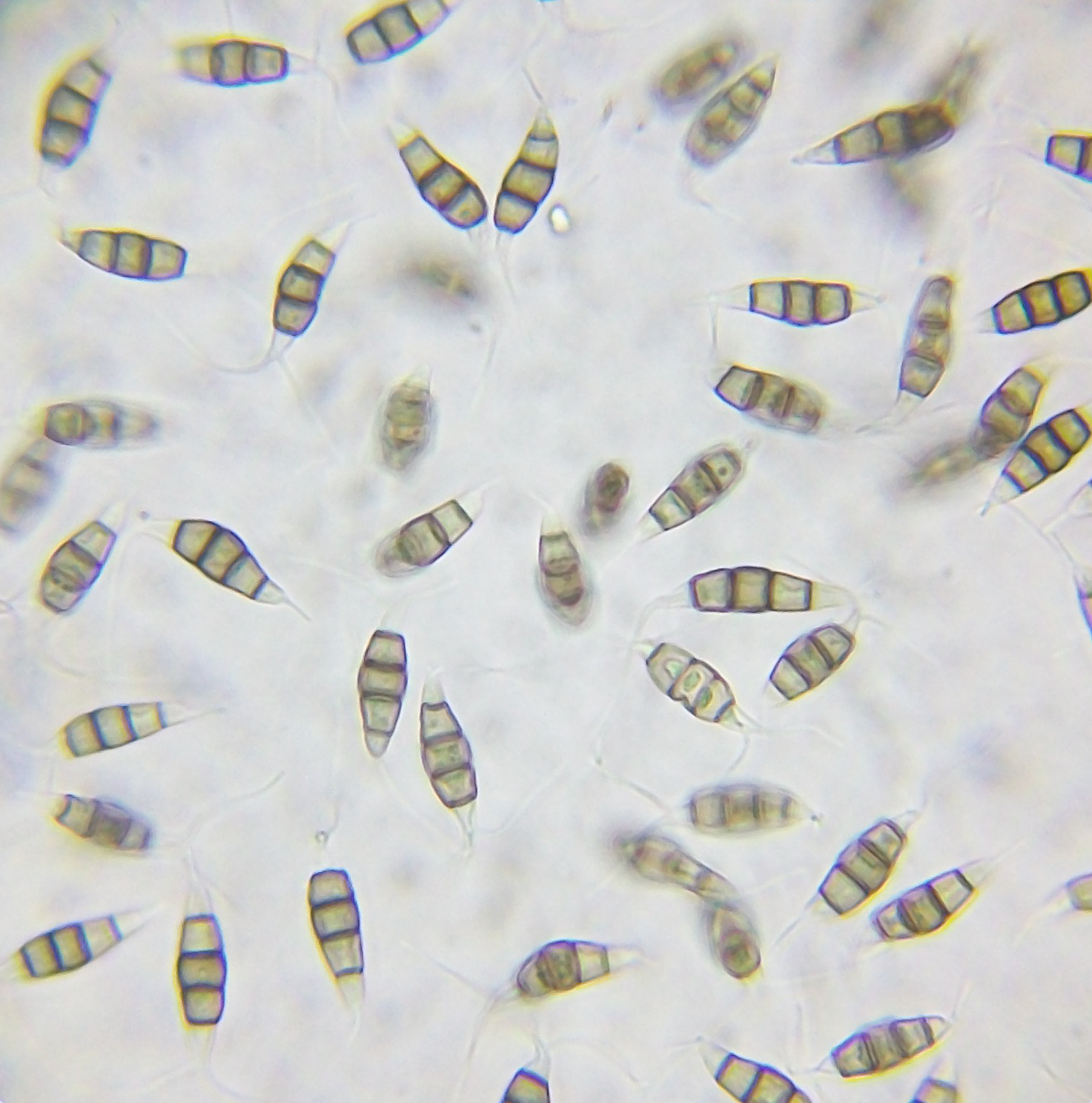
- Conidia of Pestalotiopsis microspora
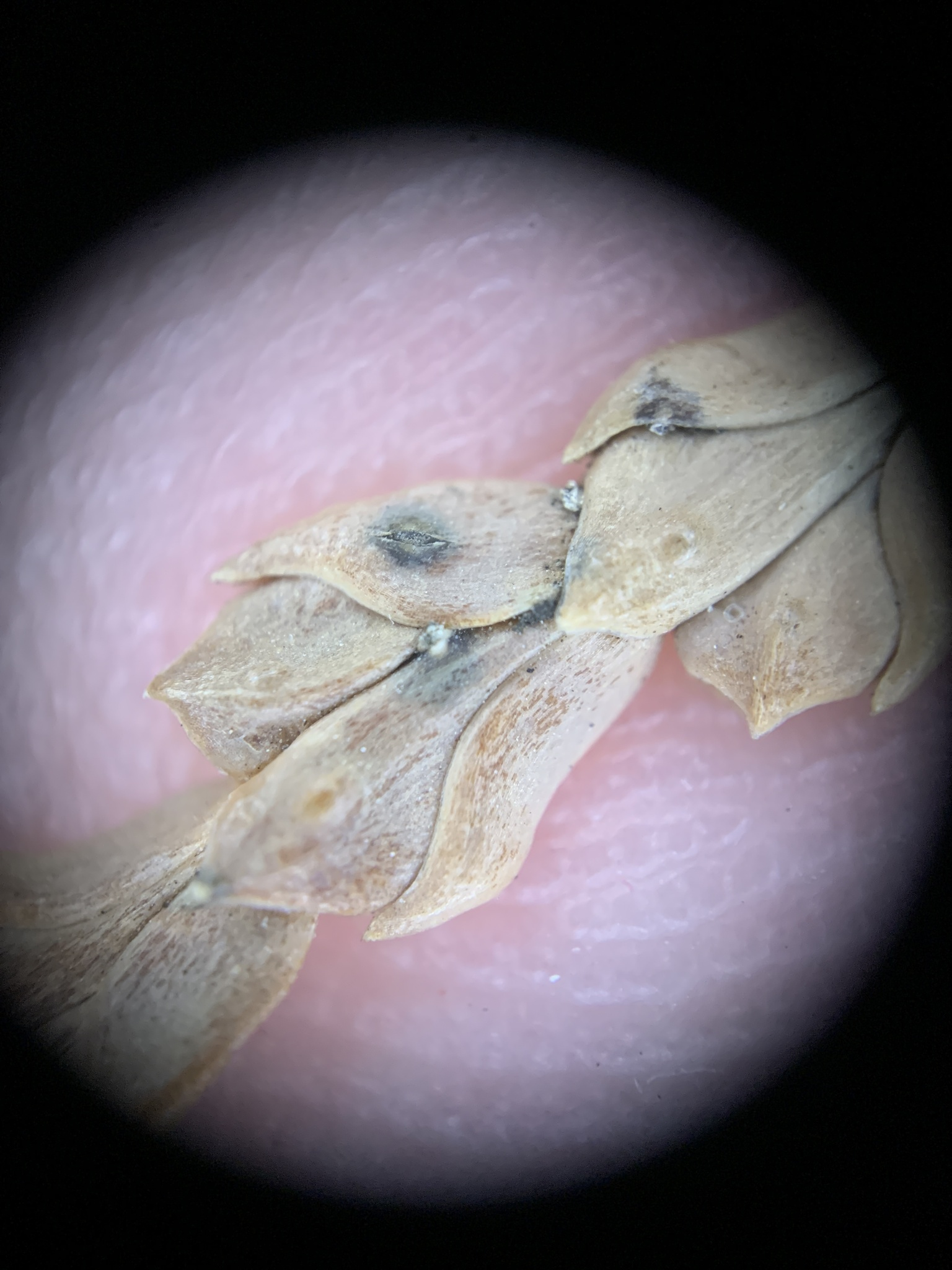
- Pestalotiopsis on Thuja occidentalis scales

Scientific classification
- Kingdom: Fungi
- Division: Ascomycota
- Class: Sordariomycetes
- Subclass: Xylariomycetidae
- Order: Amphisphaeriales
- Family: Sporocadaceae
- Genus: Pestalotiopsis

= Pestalotiopsis =

Genus of fungi

Pestalotiopsis is a genus of ascomycete fungi in the Sporocadaceae family.

== Taxonomy ==
The genus was circumscribed by René Leopold Alix Ghislain Jules Steyaert in Bull. Jard. Bot. Etat. vol.19 on page 300 in 1949.

The genus name of Pestalotiopsis is in honour of Fortunato Pestalozza (died 1878), who was an Italian botanist and doctor who worked in Constantinople and Antalya.

The phylogenetic relationships of genus Pestalotiopsis and allied genera has been calculated from ribosomal DNA sequences and morphological characters in 2002.

The sexual state of Pesalotiopsis is Pestalosphaeria, which was introduced by Barr (in 1975) with the type species Pestalosphaeria concentrica. This species was isolated from the grey-brown spots on the living leaves of Rhododendron maximum growing in North Carolina, USA.

== Hosts ==
Some species of Pestalotiopsis are confirmed to cause human and animal diseases. For example, Pestalotiopsis spp. have been isolated from a bronchial biopsy, corneal abrasions, eyes, feet, fingernails, scalp, and sinuses from the human body. In 2013, the first case of fungal keratitis caused by Pestalotiopsis clavispora was recorded.

Pestalotiopsis species are known as plant pathogens, common endophytes or saprobes in a variety of hosts and environments. The species of fungi within this genus are normally considered as secondary pathogens that can be responsible for a variety of plant diseases, including cankers, dieback, leaf spots, needle blight, tip blight, grey blight, severe chlorosis, fruit rots and various other post-harvest diseases. Pestalotiopsis species occur as generalist endophytes in trees of Western Ghats forests of southern India. In Chile, Pestalotiopsis clavispora and other Pestalotiopsis spp. causes postharvest stem end rot on avocado plants. Pestalotiopsis spp. also cause leaf spot on Japanese persimmon.

19 different Pestalotiopsis species have been found as endophytes from bark and needles of Pinus armandii Franch. in China. Botella and Diez reported the isolation of a Pestalotiopsis sp. from Pinus halepensis Mill. in Spain, and Maharachchikumbura et al. referred to a Pestalotiopsis sp. isolated from a Pinus sp. in China. Pestalotiopsis species have also been isolated as endophytes from pine seeds of Pinus armandii in Yunnan province, China, and several other pine species across Europe and North America. Then in 2020, Pestalotiopsis pini sp. nov., was found as an emerging pathogen on stone pine (Pinus pinea L.) and on Pinus pinaster in Portugal.

A new species of Pestalotiopsis from leaf spots on Licuala grandis from Hainan, China was found in 2013.

Neopestalotiopsis and Pestalotiopsis species were noted as causal agents of guava scab in Colombia.

In 2018, the first report of leaf spot disease of elephant apple (Dillenia indica) caused by Pestalotiopsis sp. occurred in India.

In 2021, the first sighting of Pestalotiopsis chamaeropis causing leaf spot on Eurya nitida occurred in China. In the same year, Pestalotiopsis kenyana was found to cause leaf spot disease on Zanthoxylum schinifolium (a species of prickly ash) in Sichuan Province, China.

== Uses ==
Some members of the genus are able to grow on the synthetic polymer polyurethane as the sole carbon source under both aerobic and anaerobic conditions, hence show promise as a form of bioremediation for waste reduction.

Some members of the genus are able to produce taxol.

In 2009, Chloropestolide A, an anti-tumor metabolite was found in Pestalotiopsis fici.

== Species ==
As accepted by Species Fungorum;

- Pestalotiopsis abietis C.M. Tian & M. Gu (2021)
- Pestalotiopsis aceris (Henn.) Y.X. Chen (1994)
- Pestalotiopsis acrocomiarum Bat. (1954)
- Pestalotiopsis acroramosa G.C. Zhao (2012)
- Pestalotiopsis adusta (Ellis & Everh.) Steyaert (1953)
- Pestalotiopsis aeruginea (Steyaert) Steyaert (1949)
- Pestalotiopsis affinis Y.X. Chen & G. Wei (2002)
- Pestalotiopsis aggestorum F. Liu & L. Cai (2017)
- Pestalotiopsis albomaculans (Henn.) Y.X. Chen (1994)
- Pestalotiopsis algeriensis (Sacc. & Berl.) Y.X. Chen (1997)
- Pestalotiopsis aloes (Trinchieri) J. Xiang Zhang & T. Xu (2003)
- Pestalotiopsis alpiniae Y.X. Chen & G. Wei (2002)
- Pestalotiopsis anacardiacearum Yan M. Zhang, Maharachch. & K.D. Hyde (2013)
- Pestalotiopsis anacardii Kamil, T.P. Devi, N. Mathur, O.P. Singh, P. Pandey, Prabhak. & V. Patil (2012)
- Pestalotiopsis angusta Steyaert (1953)
- Pestalotiopsis annonae Bat. & Peres (1966)
- Pestalotiopsis annulata (Berk. & M.A. Curtis) Steyaert (1949)
- Pestalotiopsis antenniformis (B.J. Murray) Y.X. Chen (1994)
- Pestalotiopsis anthurii (Henn.) Rib. Souza (1985)
- Pestalotiopsis antiaris Y.X. Chen & G. Wei (2002)
- Pestalotiopsis apiculata (T.Z. Huang) T.Z. Huang (1983)
- Pestalotiopsis aquatica (Ellis & Everh.) Steyaert (1949)
- Pestalotiopsis arachidis Satya (1964)
- Pestalotiopsis arborei N.I. Singh (1981)
- Pestalotiopsis arceuthobii Maharachch., K.D. Hyde & Crous (2014)
- Pestalotiopsis ardisiae (Henn.) X.A. Sun & Q.X. Ge (1990)
- Pestalotiopsis arengae Maharachch., K.D. Hyde & Crous (2014)
- Pestalotiopsis australasiae Maharachch., K.D. Hyde & Crous (2014)
- Pestalotiopsis australis Maharachch., K.D. Hyde & Crous (2014)
- Pestalotiopsis baarnensis Steyaert (1949)
- Pestalotiopsis batatas (Ellis & Everh.) G.C. Zhao & Nan Li (1995)
- Pestalotiopsis besseyi (Guba) Nag Raj (1985)
- Pestalotiopsis betazamiae (Guba) Y.X. Chen & G. Wei (2009)
- Pestalotiopsis bicilia (Dearn. & Bisby) Y.X. Chen (1997)
- Pestalotiopsis biciliata Maharachch., K.D. Hyde & Crous (2014)
- Pestalotiopsis bicolor (Ellis & Everh.) A.R. Liu, T. Xu & L.D. Guo (2006)
- Pestalotiopsis brachiata F. Liu & L. Cai (2017)
- Pestalotiopsis brassicae (Guba) Maharachch., K.D. Hyde & Crous (2014)
- Pestalotiopsis breviseta (Sacc.) Steyaert (1949)
- Pestalotiopsis brideliae (C.I. Chen) Y.X. Chen (1997)
- Pestalotiopsis briosiana (Montemart.) J.G. Wei & T. Xu (2005)
- Pestalotiopsis bruguierae Purkay. & A.K. Pal bis (1996)
- Pestalotiopsis bulbophylli S.F. Ran & Yong Wang bis (2017)
- Pestalotiopsis calabae (Westend.) Steyaert (1949)
- Pestalotiopsis camelliae Yan M. Zhang, Maharachch. & K.D. Hyde (2012)
- Pestalotiopsis camelliae-oleiferae Qin Yang & He Li (2021)
- Pestalotiopsis canangae (Koord.) Y.X. Chen (1993)
- Pestalotiopsis canarii Y.X. Chen & G. Wei (2003)
- Pestalotiopsis capitata (Ellis) Y.X. Chen & G. Wei (2009)
- Pestalotiopsis capparicola Bat. & H. Maia (1957)
- Pestalotiopsis carbonacea (Steyaert) Steyaert (1949)
- Pestalotiopsis caroliniana (Guba) Y.X. Chen (1994)
- Pestalotiopsis carveri (Guba) P.L. Zhu, Q.X. Ge & T. Xu (1991)
- Pestalotiopsis casuarinae (Cooke & Massee) Nag Raj (1993)
- Pestalotiopsis caudata (Syd. & P. Syd.) B. Sutton (1973)
- Pestalotiopsis cephalotaxi (Sawada) Y. Suto & Tak. Kobay. (1993)
- Pestalotiopsis ceratoniae (Maubl.) Rib. Souza (1985)
- Pestalotiopsis chamaeropis Maharachch., K.D. Hyde & Crous (2014)
- Pestalotiopsis chethallensis Sohi & O. Prakash (1979)
- Pestalotiopsis chiangmaiensis Y.R. Sun & Yong Wang bis (2023)
- Pestalotiopsis chinensis Maharachch. & K.D. Hyde (2012)
- Pestalotiopsis cibotii (R.P. White) B. Sutton (1993)
- Pestalotiopsis cinchonae (Zimm.) A.R. Liu, T. Xu & L.D. Guo (2006)
- Pestalotiopsis cinnamomi Y.X. Chen (1994)
- Pestalotiopsis citri (Mundk. & Khesw.) Y.X. Chen (1997)
- Pestalotiopsis citrina (McAlpine) Nag Raj (1986)
- Pestalotiopsis clavata Maharachch. & K.D. Hyde (2012)
- Pestalotiopsis clusiae (Griffon & Maubl.) J. Xiang Zhang & T. Xu (2003)
- Pestalotiopsis coffeae (Zimm.) Y.X. Chen (1993)
- Pestalotiopsis coffeae-arabicae Yu Song, K. Geng, K.D. Hyde & Yong Wang bis (2013)
- Pestalotiopsis colombiensis Maharachch., K.D. Hyde & Crous (2014)
- Pestalotiopsis congensis (Henn.) Y.X. Chen (1994)
- Pestalotiopsis conigena (Lév.) G.C. Zhao & Nan Li (1995)
- Pestalotiopsis conspicua (Servazzi) Y.X. Chen (1997)
- Pestalotiopsis coperniciae Steyaert (1961)
- Pestalotiopsis crassiuscula Steyaert (1949)
- Pestalotiopsis cruenta (Syd. & P. Syd.) Steyaert (1949)
- Pestalotiopsis cryptomeriae (Cooke) B. Sutton (1990)
- Pestalotiopsis cycadis (Allesch.) Rib. Souza (1985)
- Pestalotiopsis darjeelingensis Dube, Bilgrami & H.P. Srivast. (1964)
- Pestalotiopsis decolorata (Speg.) Steyaert (1961)
- Pestalotiopsis dianellae Crous (2017)
- Pestalotiopsis digitalis Maharachch. & K.D. Hyde (2015)
- Pestalotiopsis dilleniae Y.X. Chen & G. Wei (2002)
- Pestalotiopsis dilucida F. Liu & L. Cai (2017)
- Pestalotiopsis diploclisiae Maharachch., K.D. Hyde & Crous (2014)
- Pestalotiopsis disseminata (Thüm.) Steyaert (1949)
- Pestalotiopsis distincta (Guba) K. Yokoy. (1975)
- Pestalotiopsis diversiseta Maharachch. & K.D. Hyde (2012)
- Pestalotiopsis doitungensis X.Y. Ma, K.D. Hyde & J.C. Kang (2019)
- Pestalotiopsis dracaenae Yong Wang bis, Yu Song, K. Geng & K.D. Hyde (2015)
- Pestalotiopsis dracaenicola Chaiwan & K.D. Hyde (2020)
- Pestalotiopsis dracontomelonis Maharachch. & K.D. Hyde (2015)
- Pestalotiopsis effecta G. Srivast., S.M. Kumar & M.P. Tandon (1977)
- Pestalotiopsis elaeagni (J.V. Almeida & Sousa da Câmara) Y.X. Chen (1997)
- Pestalotiopsis elasticola (Henn.) J. Xiang Zhang & T. Xu (2003)
- Pestalotiopsis eleutherococci S.Q. Tian, R. Xu & Phukhams. (2022)
- Pestalotiopsis endophytica N.I. de Silva, Lumyong & K.D. Hyde (2021)
- Pestalotiopsis ericacearum Yan M. Zhang, Maharachch. & K.D. Hyde (2013)
- Pestalotiopsis etonensis C. Lock, Vitelli, Holdom, Y.P. Tan & R.G. Shivas (2020)
- Pestalotiopsis eugeniae (Thüm.) S. Kaneko (1980)
- Pestalotiopsis eupyrena (Tassi) Nag Raj (1989)
- Pestalotiopsis eusora (Sacc.) J. Xiang Zhang & T. Xu (2003)
- Pestalotiopsis fici Steyaert (1949)
- Pestalotiopsis flagisetula (Guba) Y.X. Chen (1994)
- Pestalotiopsis flavidula (Tassi) Y.X. Chen (1994)
- Pestalotiopsis formosana H.A. Ariyaw. & K.D. Hyde (2018)
- Pestalotiopsis fuchsiae (Thüm.) Y.X. Chen (1993)
- Pestalotiopsis funerea (Desm.) Steyaert (1949)
- Pestalotiopsis funereoides Steyaert (1949)
- Pestalotiopsis furcata Maharachch. & K.D. Hyde (2012)
- Pestalotiopsis gastrolobii (Tassi) Nag Raj (1989)
- Pestalotiopsis gaultheriae (Dearn. & House) Y.X. Chen (1997)
- Pestalotiopsis gibberosa (Sacc.) Y.X. Chen (1993)
- Pestalotiopsis gibbosa (Harkn.) Kyoko Watan., Nozawa & Callan (2018)
- Pestalotiopsis gigas Steyaert (1953)
- Pestalotiopsis glandicola (Castagne) Steyaert (1949)
- Pestalotiopsis gossypii (Hori) Y.X. Chen (1994)
- Pestalotiopsis gracilis (Kleb.) Steyaert (1949)
- Pestalotiopsis granati (Hüseyın) Nag Raj & Melnik (1994)
- Pestalotiopsis grandis Dube & Bilgrami (1966)
- Pestalotiopsis gravesii (Traverso) Tak. Kobay. (1974)
- Pestalotiopsis grevilleae Maharachch., K.D. Hyde & Crous (2014)
- Pestalotiopsis guangdongensis Y.R. Xiong & Manawas. (2022)
- Pestalotiopsis guepini (Desm.) Steyaert (1949)
- Pestalotiopsis hainanensis A.R. Liu, T. Xu & L.D. Guo (2007)
- Pestalotiopsis hawaiiensis Maharachch., K.D. Hyde & Crous (2014)
- Pestalotiopsis heritierae Purkay. & A.K. Pal bis (1996)
- Pestalotiopsis heterospora Bat., Poroca & J.L. Bezerra (1966)
- Pestalotiopsis heucherae (Tehon & E.Y. Daniels) Tak. Kobay. & E.D. Guzmán (1988)
- Pestalotiopsis hispanica F. Liu, L. Cai & Crous (2018)
- Pestalotiopsis hollandica Maharachch., K.D. Hyde & Crous (2014)
- Pestalotiopsis humicola Maharachch., K.D. Hyde & Crous (2014)
- Pestalotiopsis hunanensis Qin Yang & He Li (2021)
- Pestalotiopsis hydei Huanraluek & Jayaward. (2021)
- Pestalotiopsis hypodermia (Niessl) Steyaert (1949)
- Pestalotiopsis iberica P. Monteiro & M. Gonçalves (2021)
- Pestalotiopsis ilicis (Westend.) Steyaert (1949)
- Pestalotiopsis inflexa Maharachch. & K.D. Hyde (2012)
- Pestalotiopsis intermedia Maharachch. & K.D. Hyde (2012)
- Pestalotiopsis italiana Maharachch., Camporesi & K.D. Hyde (2015)
- Pestalotiopsis ixorae (Rangel) Bat. & Peres (1966)
- Pestalotiopsis jacksoniae (Henn.) Nag Raj (1993)
- Pestalotiopsis japonica (P. Syd.) Steyaert (1949)
- Pestalotiopsis javanica (Guba) Y.X. Chen (1993)
- Pestalotiopsis jiangxiensis F. Liu & L. Cai (2017)
- Pestalotiopsis jinchanghensis F. Liu & L. Cai (2017)
- Pestalotiopsis juncestris Kohlm. & Volkm.-Kohlm. (2001)
- Pestalotiopsis kaki K. Das, S.Y. Lee & H.Y. Jung (2020)
- Pestalotiopsis kandelicola Norph., C.H. Kuo & K.D. Hyde (2020)
- Pestalotiopsis kenyana Maharachch., K.D. Hyde & Crous (2014)
- Pestalotiopsis keteleeriae Yu Song, K.D. Hyde & Y. Wang (2014)
- Pestalotiopsis knightiae Maharachch., K.D. Hyde & Crous (2014)
- Pestalotiopsis krabiensis Tibpromma & K.D. Hyde (2018)
- Pestalotiopsis kunmingensis J.G. Wei & T. Xu (2004)
- Pestalotiopsis kwangsiensis Y.X. Chen & G. Wei (2002)
- Pestalotiopsis lagerstroemiae (Mhaiskar) Y.X. Chen (1993)
- Pestalotiopsis lambertiae (Petr.) A.R. Liu, T. Xu & L.D. Guo (2006)
- Pestalotiopsis langloisii (Guba) Tak. Kobay. & E.D. Guzmán (1988)
- Pestalotiopsis laughtonae (Doidge) J. Xiang Zhang & T. Xu (2003)
- Pestalotiopsis lawsoniae (Mundk. & Khesw.) Y.X. Chen (1994)
- Pestalotiopsis leprogena (Speg.) Kausar (1960)
- Pestalotiopsis leucadendri F. Liu, L. Cai & Crous (2018)
- Pestalotiopsis leucopogonis Nag Raj (1993)
- Pestalotiopsis leucothoes (R.P. White) Steyaert (1949)
- Pestalotiopsis licualicola K. Geng, Yu Song, K.D. Hyde & Yong Wang bis (2013)
- Pestalotiopsis lijiangensis Y.K. Zhou & C.L. Hou (2018)
- Pestalotiopsis lindquistii Steyaert (1961)
- Pestalotiopsis linearis Maharachch. & K.D. Hyde (2012)
- Pestalotiopsis loeiana Y.R. Sun & Yong Wang bis (2023)
- Pestalotiopsis longiappendiculata F. Liu & L. Cai (2017)
- Pestalotiopsis longiaristata (Maubl.) Kausar (1960)
- Pestalotiopsis longiseta (Speg.) K. Dai & Tak. Kobay. (1990)
- Pestalotiopsis lucumae (Tehon) Rib. Souza (1985)
- Pestalotiopsis lushanensis F. Liu & L. Cai (2017)
- Pestalotiopsis macadamiae R.G. Shivas & Akinsanmi (2016)
- Pestalotiopsis macadamii P.K. Chi (2000)
- Pestalotiopsis macrochaeta (Speg.) J. Xiang Zhang & T. Xu (2003)
- Pestalotiopsis macrospora (Ces.) Steyaert (1949)
- Pestalotiopsis maculans (Corda) Nag Raj (1985)
- Pestalotiopsis maculiformans (Guba & Zeller) Steyaert (1949)
- Pestalotiopsis magnoliae J.M. Yen (1980)
- Pestalotiopsis malayana Maharachch., K.D. Hyde & Crous (2014)
- Pestalotiopsis malicola (Hori) X.A. Sun & Q.X. Ge (1990)
- Pestalotiopsis mangiferae (Henn.) Steyaert (1949)
- Pestalotiopsis mangifolia (Guba) J. Xiang Zhang & T. Xu (2003)
- Pestalotiopsis matildae (Richatt) S.J. Lee & Crous (2006)
- Pestalotiopsis mayumbensis (Steyaert) Steyaert (1949)
- Pestalotiopsis melaleucae (C.C. Chen) Y.X. Chen (1994)
- Pestalotiopsis menezesiana (Bres. & Torrend) Bissett (1983)
- Pestalotiopsis menhaiensis Y.C. Wang, X.C. Wang & Y.J. Yang (2019)
- Pestalotiopsis metasequoiae (Gucevič) Nag Raj (1993)
- Pestalotiopsis micheliae (Kalani) Y.X. Chen & G. Wei (2009)
- Pestalotiopsis microspora (Speg.) G.C. Zhao & Nan Li (1995)
- Pestalotiopsis millettiae (Laughton) Y.X. Chen (1994)
- Pestalotiopsis moluccensis Purkay. & A.K. Pal bis (1996)
- Pestalotiopsis monochaeta Maharachch., K.D. Hyde & Crous (2014)
- Pestalotiopsis monochaetioides (Doyer) Steyaert (1949)
- Pestalotiopsis montellica (Sacc. & Voglino) Tak. Kobay. (1974)
- Pestalotiopsis montellicoides Mordue (1986)
- Pestalotiopsis moorei (Harkn.) Nag Raj (1993)
- Pestalotiopsis nanjingensis Qin Yang & He Li (2021)
- Pestalotiopsis nanningensis Qin Yang & He Li (2021)
- Pestalotiopsis nattrassii Steyaert (1953)
- Pestalotiopsis nattrassioides G.C. Zhao (2012)
- Pestalotiopsis neglecta (Thüm.) Steyaert (1953)
- Pestalotiopsis nelumbonis Y.X. Chen & G. Wei (2002)
- Pestalotiopsis neolitseae H.A. Ariyaw. & K.D. Hyde (2018)
- Pestalotiopsis novae-hollandiae Maharachch., K.D. Hyde & Crous (2014)
- Pestalotiopsis oenotherae Venkatas., Grand & Van Dyke (1991)
- Pestalotiopsis oleandri (Guba) P.L. Zhu, Q.X. Ge & T. Xu (1991)
- Pestalotiopsis oryzae Maharachch., K.D. Hyde & Crous (2014)
- Pestalotiopsis osyridis (Thüm.) H.T. Sun & R.B. Cao (1990)
- Pestalotiopsis owenii Steyaert (1953)
- Pestalotiopsis oxyanthi (Thüm.) Steyaert (1949)
- Pestalotiopsis pachirae Y.X. Chen & G. Wei (2003)
- Pestalotiopsis paeoniae Steyaert (1949)
- Pestalotiopsis paeoniicola (Tsukam. & T. Hino) J.G. Wei & T. Xu (2005)
- Pestalotiopsis pallidicolor (Speg.) Steyaert (1961)
- Pestalotiopsis pallidotheae Kyoto Watan. & Yas. Ono (2010)
- Pestalotiopsis palmarum (Cooke) Steyaert (1949)
- Pestalotiopsis pampeana (Speg.) A.R. Liu, T. Xu & L.D. Guo (2006)
- Pestalotiopsis pandani (Verona) A.R. Liu, T. Xu & L.D. Guo (2006)
- Pestalotiopsis pandanicola Tibpromma & K.D. Hyde (2018)
- Pestalotiopsis papposa Steyaert (1949)
- Pestalotiopsis papuana Maharachch., K.D. Hyde & Crous (2014)
- Pestalotiopsis paraguariensis Y.X. Chen (1993)
- Pestalotiopsis parva Maharachch., K.D. Hyde & Crous (2014)
- Pestalotiopsis perseae Nag Raj (1993)
- Pestalotiopsis pestalozzioides (Dearn. & Fairm.) Nag Raj (1993)
- Pestalotiopsis peyronelii (Verona) Y.X. Chen (1994)
- Pestalotiopsis phaii Y.X. Chen & G. Wei (2003)
- Pestalotiopsis phoenicis (Vize) Y.X. Chen (1993)
- Pestalotiopsis photiniicola Ya Ya Chen, K.D. Hyde, Jian K. Liu & Maharachch. (2016)
- Pestalotiopsis pini A.C. Silva, E. Diogo & H. Bragança (2020)
- Pestalotiopsis pinicola Tibpromma, Karunaratha & Mortimer (2019)
- Pestalotiopsis pipericola (Mundk. & Khesw.) Y.X. Chen (1997)
- Pestalotiopsis pittospori Court (1955)
- Pestalotiopsis planimi (Vize) Steyaert (1949)
- Pestalotiopsis pleurocrinita G.C. Zhao (2012)
- Pestalotiopsis podocarpi (Dennis) X.A. Sun & Q.X. Ge (1990)
- Pestalotiopsis portugallica Maharachch., K.D. Hyde & Crous (2014)
- Pestalotiopsis psidii (Pat.) Mordue (1976)
- Pestalotiopsis puttemansii (Henn.) Rib. Souza (1985)
- Pestalotiopsis puyae (Henn.) Nag Raj (1993)
- Pestalotiopsis pycnoides (J.V. Almeida & Sousa da Câmara) Y.X. Chen (1997)
- Pestalotiopsis quadriciliata (Bubák & Dearn.) Bissett (1983)
- Pestalotiopsis quercicola (Kuhnh.-Lord. & J.P. Barry) X.A. Sun & Q.X. Ge (1990)
- Pestalotiopsis rapanea (Viégas) Rib. Souza (1985)
- Pestalotiopsis rhamni (Celotti) Y.X. Chen (1997)
- Pestalotiopsis rhizophorae Norphanphoun, T.C. Wen & K.D. Hyde (2020)
- Pestalotiopsis rhododendri (D. Sacc.) Y.X. Chen (1994)
- Pestalotiopsis rhodomyrti Yu Song, K. Geng, K.D. Hyde & Yong Wang bis (2013)
- Pestalotiopsis rosea Maharachch. & K.D. Hyde (2012)
- Pestalotiopsis royenae (Guba) Steyaert (1949)
- Pestalotiopsis sabal Y.R. Xiong & Manawas. (2022)
- Pestalotiopsis saccardensis (Guba) Y.X. Chen (1993)
- Pestalotiopsis sapotae (Henn.) Rib. Souza (1985)
- Pestalotiopsis schimae Y.X. Chen & G. Wei (2002)
- Pestalotiopsis scirpina (Ellis & G. Martin) J. Xiang Zhang & T. Xu (2003)
- Pestalotiopsis scoparia Maharachch., K.D. Hyde & Crous (2014)
- Pestalotiopsis sequoiae W.J. Li & K.D. Hyde (2016)
- Pestalotiopsis shiraiana (Henn.) Y.X. Chen (1994)
- Pestalotiopsis shoreae Yu Song, Tangthir., K.D. Hyde & Y. Wang (2014)
- Pestalotiopsis sichuanensis Y.C. Wang, X.C. Wang & Y.J. Yang (2019)
- Pestalotiopsis siliquastri (Thüm.) Y.X. Chen (1993)
- Pestalotiopsis sinensis (C.I. Chen) P.L. Zhu, Q.X. Ge & T. Xu (1991)
- Pestalotiopsis smilacicola Y.R. Sun & Yong Wang bis (2023)
- Pestalotiopsis smilacis (Schwein.) B. Sutton (1975)
- Pestalotiopsis sonsensis (Henn.) Steyaert (1949)
- Pestalotiopsis sorbi (Pat.) X.A. Sun & Q.X. Ge (1990)
- Pestalotiopsis spathulata Maharachch., K.D. Hyde & Crous (2014)
- Pestalotiopsis spathuliappendiculata F. Liu, L. Cai & Crous (2018)
- Pestalotiopsis stellata (Berk. & M.A. Curtis) H.T. Sun & R.B. Cao (1990)
- Pestalotiopsis stictica (Berk. & M.A. Curtis) Steyaert (1949)
- Pestalotiopsis subcuticularis (Guba) J.G. Wei & T. Xu (2005)
- Pestalotiopsis submersa Sati & N. Tiwari (1993)
- Pestalotiopsis subshorea Yong Wang bis, Yu Song, K. Geng & K.D. Hyde (2015)
- Pestalotiopsis suffocata (Ellis & Everh.) J.G. Wei & T. Xu (2005)
- Pestalotiopsis sydowiana (Bres.) B. Sutton (1961)
- Pestalotiopsis synsepali Y.X. Chen & G. Wei (2002)
- Pestalotiopsis taslimiana (Mundk. & Khesw.) Kausar (1960)
- Pestalotiopsis tecomicola Nag Raj (1993)
- Pestalotiopsis telopeae Maharachch., K.D. Hyde & Crous (2014)
- Pestalotiopsis terminaliae G.P. Agarwal & Hasija (1961)
- Pestalotiopsis termitarii Kamil, T.P. Devi, N. Mathur, O. Prakash, P. Pandey, Prabhak. & V. Patil (2012)
- Pestalotiopsis terricola F. Liu, L. Cai & Crous (2018)
- Pestalotiopsis thailandica Norphanphoun, Doilom & K.D. Hyde (2020)
- Pestalotiopsis thujicola (J.L. Maas) Y. Suto & Tak. Kobay. (1993)
- Pestalotiopsis tiliae (Guba) Y.X. Chen (1994)
- Pestalotiopsis toxica (Ellis & Everh.) X.A. Sun & Q.X. Ge (1990)
- Pestalotiopsis trachycarpicola Yan M. Zhang & K.D. Hyde (2012)
- Pestalotiopsis trichocladi (Laughton) Steyaert (1954)
- Pestalotiopsis triseptata A.K. Agarwal & S. Chauhan (1989)
- Pestalotiopsis triseta (M. Moreau & Moreau) Steyaert (1949)
- Pestalotiopsis unicolor Maharachch. & K.D. Hyde (2012)
- Pestalotiopsis uvicola (Speg.) Bissett (1983)
- Pestalotiopsis ventricosa (Nann.) Y.X. Chen (1994)
- Pestalotiopsis verruculosa Maharachch. & K.D. Hyde (2012)
- Pestalotiopsis versicolor (Speg.) Steyaert (1949)
- Pestalotiopsis virgatula (Kleb.) Steyaert (1949)
- Pestalotiopsis vismiae (Petr.) J. Xiang Zhang & T. Xu (2003)
- Pestalotiopsis westerdykiae Steyaert (1949)
- Pestalotiopsis woodfordiae G.P. Agarwal & Hasija (1961)
- Pestalotiopsis yanglingensis F. Liu & L. Cai (2017)
- Pestalotiopsis yunnanensis J.G. Wei, T. Xu & L.D. Guo (2012)

== Taxonomy ==
A phylogenetic analysis in 2013 with some of the Pestalotiopsis species are found in the following tree:

- - Subclade 1
    - - - - - - - P. trachicarpicola
                - P. rhodomytrus
              - P. rosea
            - P. adusta
          - - - - P. chinensis
                - P. verruculosa
              - - P. intermedia
                - P. linearis
              - P. unicolor
            - P. clavata
        - P. inflexa
      - P. diversiseta
    - P. jesteri
  - Subclade 2
    - - - - - - - P. chrysea
                - P. umberspora
              - P. asiatica
            - P. coffeae-arabicae
          - - P. clavispora
            - P. ellipsospora
        - P. foedans
      - P. saprophya
    - P. theae

== See also ==
- Plastivore

== Other sources ==
- Song Y, Geng K, Zhang B, Hyde KD, Zhao WS, Wei JG, Kang JC, Wang Y (2013) Two new species of Pestalotiopsis from Southern China. Phytotaxa 126(1): 22–30. https://doi.org/10.11646/phytotaxa.126.1.2
