= Pestalotiopsis leprogena =

Scientific classification
- Kingdom: Fungi
- Division: Ascomycota
- Class: Sordariomycetes
- Order: Amphisphaeriales
- Family: Sporocadaceae
- Genus: Pestalotiopsis
- Species: P. leprogena

Binomial name
- Pestalotiopsis leprogena (Speg.) Steyaert, (1961)

Species of fungus

Pestalotiopsis leprogena is a fungal plant pathogen infecting bananas.
