= Calonectria pteridis =

Scientific classification
- Domain: Eukaryota
- Kingdom: Fungi
- Division: Ascomycota
- Class: Sordariomycetes
- Order: Hypocreales
- Family: Nectriaceae
- Genus: Calonectria
- Species: C. pteridis

Binomial name
- Calonectria pteridis Crous, M.J.Wingf. & Alfenas (1993)

Synonyms
- Cylindrocladium pteridis F.A.Wolf (1926)

Species of fungus

Calonectria pteridis is a fungal plant pathogen. It is native to North America. It lives on the leaves of the Polystichum adiantiforme, Dryopteris normalis and of Nephrolepis exaltata plants, among others. The name is synonymous with Cylindrocladium pteridis.
