= Fomes lamaensis =

Scientific classification
- Kingdom: Fungi
- Division: Basidiomycota
- Class: Agaricomycetes
- Order: Polyporales
- Family: Polyporaceae
- Genus: Fomes
- Species: F. lamaensis

Binomial name
- Fomes lamaensis (Murrill) Sacc. & Trotter, (1912)

Species of fungus

Fomes lamaensis is a plant pathogen of the tea plant.

== See also ==
- List of tea diseases
