= Calonectria reteaudii =

Scientific classification
- Domain: Eukaryota
- Kingdom: Fungi
- Division: Ascomycota
- Class: Sordariomycetes
- Order: Hypocreales
- Family: Nectriaceae
- Genus: Calonectria
- Species: C. reteaudii

Binomial name
- Calonectria reteaudii (Bugnic.) C. Booth 1966

Synonyms
- Cylindrocarpon reteaudii Bugnic. 1939; Cylindrocladium reteaudii (Bugnic.) Boesew. 1982; Neonectria reteaudii Bugnic. 1939

Species of fungus

Calonectria reteaudii is a species of fungus in the family Nectriaceae.
