= Arenaria =

Arenaria, a Latin word meaning sand-loving (or psammophilic), may refer to:

== Genera ==
- Arenaria (bird), the turnstones, a bird genus of the family Scolopacidae
- Arenaria (plant), the sandworts, a plant genus of the family Caryophyllaceae

== Species ==
- Phengaris alcon arenaria, the Dutch alcon blue, an extinct subspecies of the alcon blue butterfly that was endemic to the Netherlands
- Meloidogyne arenaria thamesi, a synonym for Meloidogyne thamesi, the Thames' root-knot nematode, a plant-pathogenic nematode species

== See also ==
- Arenarium
- Arenarius (disambiguation)
