= Cylindrocladium =

Scientific classification
- Domain: Eukaryota
- Kingdom: Fungi
- Division: Ascomycota
- Class: Sordariomycetes
- Order: Hypocreales
- Family: Nectriaceae
- Genus: Cylindrocladium; Morgan 1892

Species
- See text

Genus of fungi

Cylindrocladium is a genus of ascomycete fungi in the family Nectriaceae. Many species within this genus are synonymous with the genus Calonectria.

== Species ==
- Cylindrocladium bambusae
- Cylindrocladium buxicola
- Cylindrocladium clavatum
- Cylindrocladium colombiense
- Cylindrocladium couratarii
- Cylindrocladium ellipticum
- Cylindrocladium heptaseptatum
- Cylindrocladium infestans
- Cylindrocladium intermedium
- Cylindrocladium lanceolatum
- Cylindrocladium macrosporum
- Cylindrocladium musae
- Cylindrocladium perseae
- Cylindrocladium peruvianum
- Cylindrocladium terrestre
