= Calonectria pyrochroa =

Scientific classification
- Kingdom: Fungi
- Division: Ascomycota
- Class: Sordariomycetes
- Order: Hypocreales
- Family: Nectriaceae
- Genus: Calonectria
- Species: C. pyrochroa

Binomial name
- Calonectria pyrochroa (Desm.) Sacc., (1878)

Synonyms
- Calonectria hederae G. Arnaud ex C. Booth, (1960); Nectria pyrochroa Desm., (1856); Neonectria reteaudii Bugnic., (1939)

Species of fungus

Calonectria pyrochroa is a fungal ascomycete plant pathogen infecting tea.

== See also ==
- List of tea diseases
