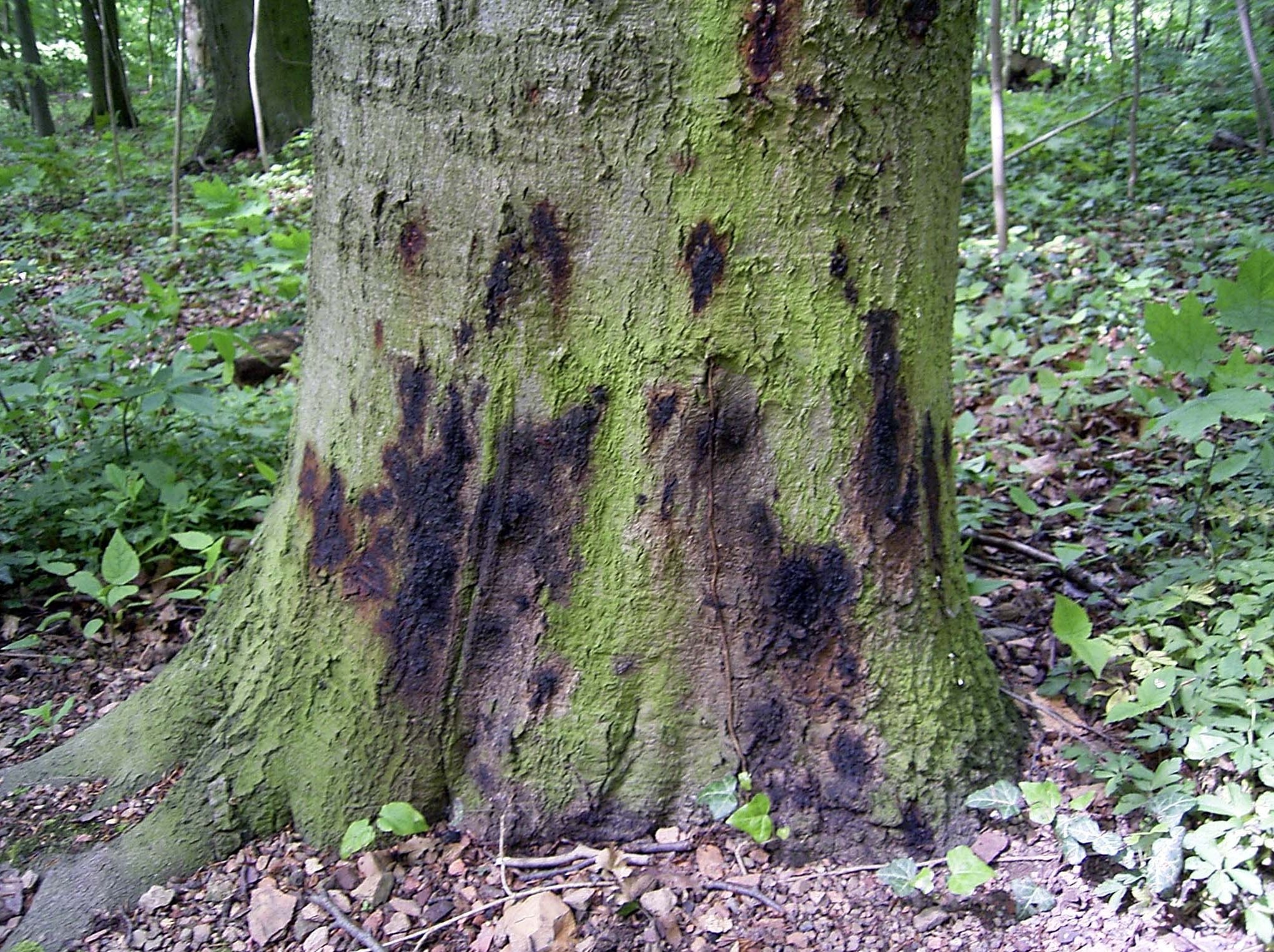

Scientific classification
- Kingdom: Fungi
- Division: Ascomycota
- Class: Sordariomycetes
- Order: Xylariales
- Family: Xylariaceae
- Genus: Kretzschmaria
- Species: K. deusta

Binomial name
- Kretzschmaria deusta (Hoffm.) P.M.D. Martin, (1970)

Synonyms
- Discosphaera deusta(Hoffm.) Dumort., (1822); Hypoxylon deustum(Hoffm.) Grev., (1828); Hypoxylon magnosporumLloyd, (1921); Hypoxylon ustulatumBull., (1791); Nemania deusta(Hoffm.) Gray, (1821); Nemania maxima(Weber) House, (1925); Sphaeria albodeustaWahlenb., (1826); Sphaeria deustaHoffm., (1787); Sphaeria maximaWeber, (1778); Sphaeria maximaBolton, (1788); Sphaeria versipellisTode, (1791); Stromatosphaeria deusta(Hoffm.) Grev., (1824); Ustulina deusta(Hoffm.) Lind, (1913); Ustulina maxima(Weber) Wettst., (1885); Ustulina vulgarisTul. & C. Tul., (1863)

= Kretzschmaria deusta =

Species of fungus

Kretzschmaria deusta, commonly known as brittle cinder, is a fungus and plant pathogen found in temperate regions.

== Taxonomy ==
The species was originally described as Sphaeria deusta by German naturalist George Franz Hoffman in 1787, and later changed in 1970 by South African mycologist P.M.D. Martin to Kretzschmaria deusta. The synonym Ustulina deusta persisted for several decades. The epithet deusta was derived from Latin, meaning burnt.

== Description ==
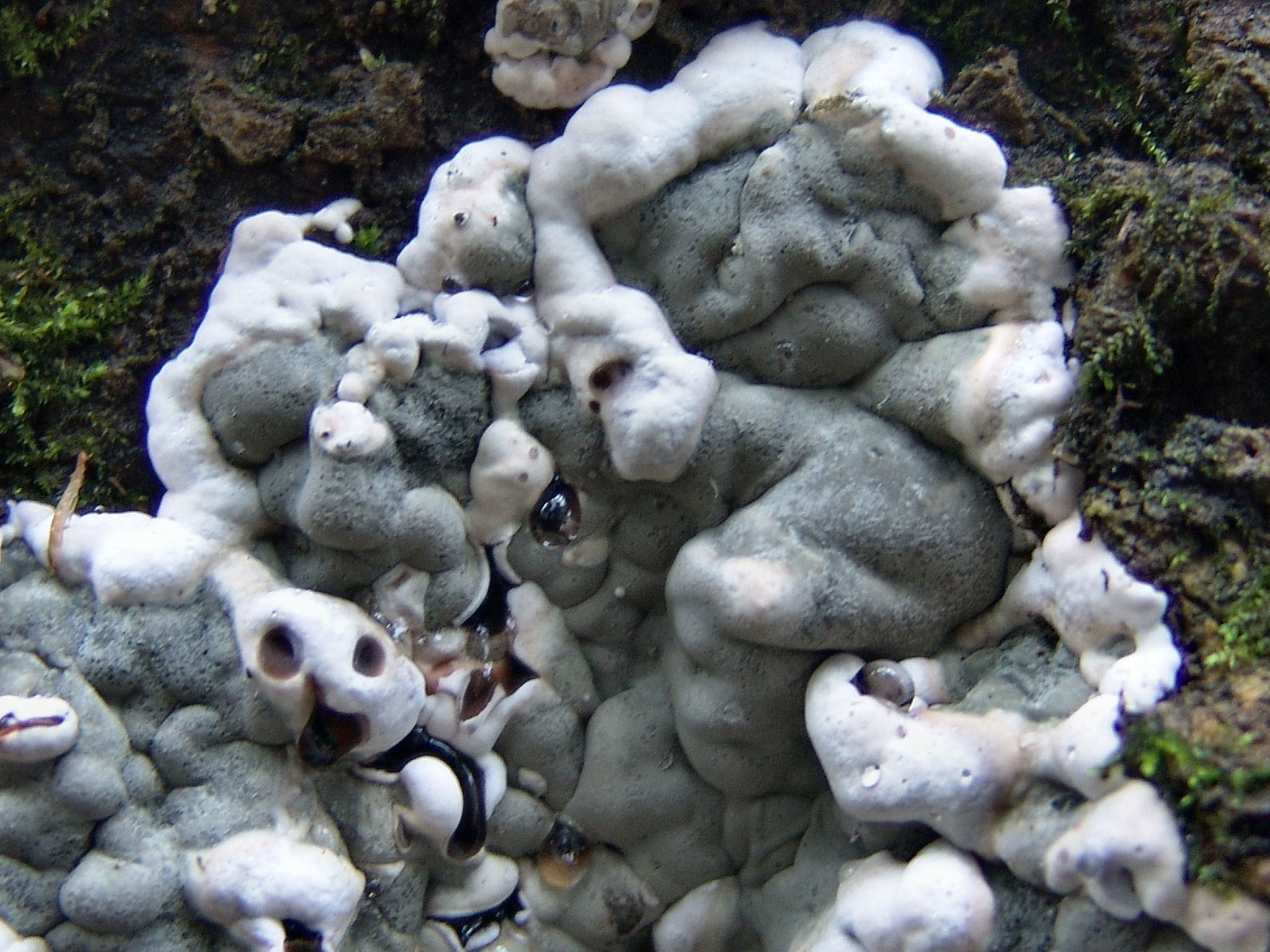
Young K. deusta growing on tree

Kretzschmaria deusta is described as a wavy-edged cushion or crust, ranging in color from grey to white when young, and changing to black and brittle with age. Older fruitbodies look similar to charred wood, probably leading to them being underreported or ignored. Kretzschmaria deusta has a flask-shaped perithecium that contains asci in the fertile surface layer. Asci are typically 300 x 15 μm, with 8 spores per ascus. Smooth conidiospores also produced via asexual reproduction, typically 7 x 3 μm.

New fruiting bodies are formed in the spring and are flat and gray with white edges. The inconspicuous fruiting bodies persist all year and their appearance changes to resemble asphalt or charcoal, consisting of black, domed, lumpy crusts that crumble when pushed with force. The resulting brittle fracture can exhibit a ceramic-like fracture surface. Black zone lines can often be seen in cross-sections of wood infected with K. deusta. It is not edible.

=== Similar species ===
When young, K. deusta can resemble species such as Trichoderma viride. When mature, it can resemble species of Annulohypoxylon, Camarops, Entoleuca, and Daldinia (which has a ringed interior).

== Habitat and ecology ==
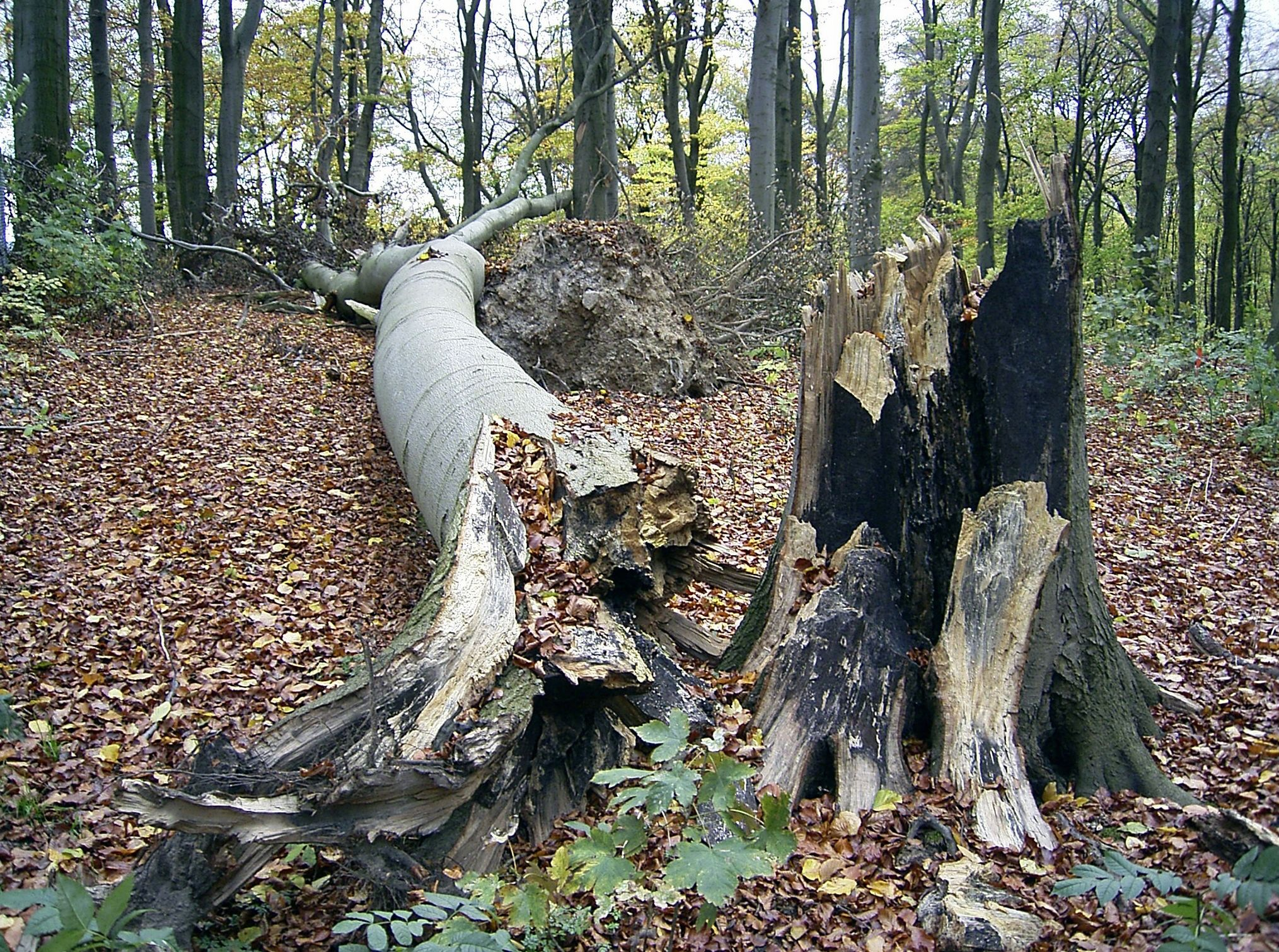
K. deusta infection caused the rot of this beech tree.

K. deusta is found in temperate regions of the Northern Hemisphere on broad-leaved trees. It is also found in Argentina, South Africa, and Australia.

It inhabits living hardwood trees including, but not limited to, European beech (Fagus sylvatica), American beech (Fagus grandifolia), sugar maple (Acer saccharum), red maple (Acer rubrum), norway maple (Acer platanoides), oaks (Quercus), hackberry (Celtis), linden (Tilia), elm (Ulmus), and other hardwoods. The most probably colonization strategy of K. deusta is heart rot invasion. The initial colonization occurs through injuries to lower stems and/or roots of living trees, or through root contact with infected trees. It causes a soft rot, initially and preferentially degrading cellulose and ultimately breaking down both cellulose and lignin. The fungus continues to decay wood after the host tree has died, making K. deusta a facultative parasite.

== Treatment and prognosis ==
Studies show the possibility of a Trichoderma species being used as a biocontrol agent against the fungal pathogen. Otherwise, there is no designated treatment for K. deusta once it has infected its host. Once established, the infection is terminal for the tree. It can result in sudden breakage in otherwise apparently healthy trees, with visually healthy crowns. This can result in less than acceptable risk from hazardous trees in higer target (particularly public) settings near roadways, trails, or buildings. Therefore, the recommended treatment would be to remove or significantly reduce the height of trees in higher occupancy areas or within falling distance of structures and to avoid using the infected plant material as mulch.
