= Pseudopestalotiopsis theae =

Scientific classification
- Kingdom: Fungi
- Division: Ascomycota
- Class: Sordariomycetes
- Order: Amphisphaeriales
- Family: Sporocadaceae
- Genus: Pseudopestalotiopsis
- Species: P. theae

Binomial name
- Pseudopestalotiopsis theae (Sawada) Maharachch., K.D. Hyde & Crous

Synonyms
- Pestalotia theae Sawada, (1915) Pestalotiopsis theae (Sawada) Steyaert, (1949)

Species of fungus

Pseudopestalotiopsis theae is a plant pathogen affecting tea.

Pseudopestalotiopsis theae is known to cause 'Gray Tea Blight' on tea tree plants. It damages production and alters the quality of the tea produced. It mainly infects mature and old plant foliage and can also infect young shoots. Under conditions of high temperature and high humidity it can lead to defoliation of the plants. It was first found in 1973 in Kagoshima, Japan and was originally called 'zonate leaf spot' (Takaya 1978). and then formally identified and published as Pestalotiopsis theae.

Fungal pathogens present such a major threat to tea leaves that it requires use of chemical fungicides. But due to the polluting effects of the fungicides which has resulted in tighter health and environmental regulations. Studies have shown antifungal activity of plant extracts against pathogens of rice, tomato, wheat, pea, and other important crops (Rana et al., Sindhan et al., Hu et al). Anti-fungal components from plants have been researched in treatment off the fungus.

In 1999, the first report of leaf blight on sweet persimmon tree by Pestalotiopsis theae in Spain was documented.

When the genus Pseudopestalotiopsis was created in 2014, Pestalotiopsis theae was transferred into the genus as well. Pseudopestalotiopsis theae is also found in India and China, while a similar blight causing fungus Pestalotiopsis longiseta (within the same family) is only found in Japan.

In 2018, it has also been found to cause leaf spots on Date Palm (Phoenix dactylifera) leaves in China. The oval to irregular (in shape) spots were recorded as being brown with a yellow margin which was 1 to 20 mm in diameter. Previously, Pseudopestalotiopsis theae was reported on oil palm (Elaeis guineensis Jacq.) in Sierra Leone and also in Thailand. It was then recorded causing leaf spot on Euonymus japonicus plants in China in 2022. The infected leaves had yellow spots of 1.2 to 4.9 mm in diameter, which then expanded to become large and irregular shaped lesions, having white center surrounded by a brown halo.

In 2019 in a rural part of India, a 55 year old woman was treated in hospital for Pseudopestalotiopsis keratitis (a fungal infection within the cornea of the eye) causing pain, redness, and decreased vision in the right eye. It was discovered using DNA sequencing to be Pseudopestalotiopsis theae. Scarring on the cornea meant the patient never regained full sight but recovered enough to leave hospital.

== See also ==
- List of tea diseases
