= Pestalotiopsis guepini =

Scientific classification
- Kingdom: Fungi
- Division: Ascomycota
- Class: Sordariomycetes
- Order: Amphisphaeriales
- Family: Sporocadaceae
- Genus: Pestalotiopsis
- Species: P. guepini

Binomial name
- Pestalotiopsis guepini (Desm.) Steyaert

Synonyms
- Pestalotia guepinii Desm.; Lepteutypa concentrica (M.E. Barr) Arx; Pestalosphaeria concentrica M.E. Barr; Pestalotia guepinii D. Sacc.; Pestalotia macrotricha Kleb.; Pestalotiopsis guepinii var. macrotricha (Kleb.) B. Sutton; Pestalotiopsis guepinii var. major Steyaert

Species of fungus

Pestalotiopsis guepini is a fungal plant pathogen infecting rhododendrons and camellia.
