= Hypoxylon canker of shade trees =

Tree disease

Hypoxylon mammatum signs on aspen

Hypoxylon canker of shade trees is a weak ascomycete fungus that negatively affects growth and can eventually lead to the death of weak or diseased host trees. There are many different species that affect different trees. For example, Hypoxylon atropunctatum, a common species, is found on oak trees, Hypoxylon tinctor affects sycamore trees, and Hypoxylon mammatum infests aspen trees.

Although the fungus is found on the majority of tree bark in an infested area, it only harms the tree when the tree becomes stressed or injured because it is easier to infect. Thus, Hypoxylon has an endophytic stage. An endophyte is an organism such as a bacterium or fungus that spends some of its life not causing disease to the host while being on it. When a stress or injury occurs, the fungus will infect and begin living off the nutrients of the tree. Hypoxylon infects trees throughout the United States, but a few notable wide-scale problems have occurred in Arkansas, North Texas, Oklahoma, and the Mountain West.

Hypoxylon canker of shade trees is a secondary disease: a primary factor, such as drought or physical damage, usually causes the dying and decaying of the tree first before the Hypoxylon canker pathogen infects. This will cause the tree to be in stress and potentially start to decay. The pathogen infects the living tree while it is in stress; it will not infect a tree that is healthy or already dead. In order for a tree to become infected, the tree must be already dying or at least must have branches that are dying. The pathogen will therefore kill the tree if the tree is unhealthy.

== Hosts and symptoms ==
Hypoxylon mammatum symptoms on aspen

Hypoxylon canker of shade trees has three primary species, through which the pathogen can infect a variety of hardwood shade trees. Hypoxylon atropunctatum is most commonly found on oak, Hypoxylon mammatum is a significant pathogen on aspen trees, and Hypoxylon tinctor infects sycamore trees. In order to tell if the pathogen is affecting the tree, the bark must be closely examined, but the symptoms are distinct.

Early stages of the disease show a light brown and tan color that looks dry and dusty. Later on, as the pathogen goes through the sexual stage, the bark will turn to a dark grey color. The bark becomes brittle and flakes off, and black and grey cankers will appear. These changes are symptoms, indications of a disease. They demonstrate that the pathogen is present and infecting or has already infested the host.

Hypoxylon also produces characteristic signs, which are either going to be direct products of the pathogen or the appearance of the pathogen itself. The visible signs from Hypoxylon are conidia and ascospores. Conidia are produced during the asexual stage, while ascospores are produced during the sexual stage. One can sometimes see the conidia with the naked eye if they are structuralized, but it is much easier to see them under a dissecting microscope. When looking through a compound microscope, it is possible to see the ascospores. They will be located on perithecia. The microscopic signs of the perithecium are the flask-shaped sexual fruiting body that contains ascospores.

Lastly, the pathogen is going to be found primarily just beneath the bark of the trees, located throughout the tree and if the pathogen spreads. The pathogen can also spread to the bark of surrounding trees. If one sees symptoms on the main trunk, the tree is likely too diseased to save, since the trunk is the spot where the nutrients and water are transported. Once Hypoxylon is active on the main trunk, there is no other way for the water and nutrients to get to the rest of the tree and thus it dies. Fortunately, if Hypoxylon is found on the branches or limbs there is a good chance the tree will live if the fungus does not spread. Pruning out the limbs and branches that look like they have the disease on it or are dying will solve the problem.

== Disease cycle ==
=== Factors that give rise to infection ===
Hypoxylon canker of shade trees is an ascomycete fungal disease. The fungal pathogen must take advantage of wounds in the host tree or unhealthy tree tissue to infect and colonize the host, as normal, robust trees are not very susceptible to infection. However, many hosts of Hypoxylon canker, such as red and post oaks, are especially sensitive to external factors; thus, they are easily stressed and can become susceptible hosts. It is often noted that Hypoxylon canker does not kill a tree—it merely capitalizes on trees that are already dying due to stress or other means, and may be a significant contributing factor to tree death. The Hypoxylon can remain dormant in healthy trees for many years before becoming pathogenic due to plant stress from temperature, water loss, physical and chemical diseases, and other plant pathogens.

=== Stages of infection ===
While the spores can colonize and slowly grow under the bark of trees in an endophytic stage, they do not demonstrate any pathogenic effects or grow in great numbers until the tree is water stressed, nutrient depleted, or physically damaged; for this reason, the year following a significant drought or other physical stress is often when Hypoxylon canker is seen in shade trees. Thus, before stress, Hypoxylon only infects its host in a local, benign manner, with limited propagation. Once the stress occurs, however, the fungus colonizes the inner parts of the bark and vascular system; while the infection is not fully systemic, it is certainly less localized than before stress. Hypoxylon canker of shade trees has both an asexual (anamorph) and sexual (teleomorph) life cycle.

==== Asexual (anamorph) stage ====
The fungus can infect seedlings and typically colonizes under the bark of the trees. Since the fungus infects under the bark, the signs of the pathogen aren't visible until the bark sheds off in response to the physical pressure imposed by the growthing pathogen; this typically happens in the transition between spring and summer. This shedding reveals large brown fungal mats, called stroma, which are the asexual reproductive structures that house the asexual spores, conidia, on conidiophores. At this point, the reproductive structures will release conidia. These spores are distributed by wind or rain splash. If these spores land on a susceptible host, successful infection will take place if there are humid and warm conditions for 48 hours.

==== Sexual (teleomorph) stage ====
After the conidia have been dispersed by late summer and fall, the stroma turn very dark, often brown or black, and crusty. At this point, the stroma produce sexual fruiting bodies. Within these perithecia fruiting bodies, the sexual spores—ascospores—are produced in and can also be distributed via rain splash and wind and infect in a manner similar to the conidia.

== Environment ==
Hypoxylon canker greatly depends on dying tree matter, which is why it generally attacks only damaged and stressed trees. Normal, healthy trees are able to fend off infection with their natural defense mechanisms such as basal defense and hypersensitive response. Furthermore, it is known that the Hypoxylon fungi already exist on the majority of trees and are only waiting for a possible infection route to be created. When damage or stress occurs, the fungi will further colonize, infect, and begin living off the nutrients of the tree, flourishing in the bark and vascular system. Natural stresses such as defoliation by insects, animal damage, soil nutrient depletions, drought, overcrowding, and other disease can weaken trees, enabling Hypoxylon to infect. Human-caused problems can also lead to infection; soil compaction and excavation, construction, and physical injuries are known stresses to trees.

Drought is one of the major indicators that Hypoxylon will become a problem in the following months to years. Droughts account for a large majority of tree-related problems as the water deficit has a negative effect on the tree's natural developments. Symptoms usually develop within a year after a drought, but with extreme conditions can develop in a matter of months. A major factor in the survival of Hypoxylon canker is the moisture content within the tree wood. When the stresses mentioned above begin to weaken the tree, moisture content of the wood decreases. As the wood further dries, the Hypoxylon fungi will feed and further white rot and decay of the tree will occur, potentially causing death.

== Management ==
Although there is no known cure for Hypoxylon canker, proper management practices and care can significantly reduce problems that may occur. Generally, avoiding tree stress and maintaining an overall healthy tree is the most ideal way of avoiding the canker. Avoiding any physical injuries to the trunk, limbs, or roots is important as these injuries can disrupt growth processes and xylem/phloem transport. Disruptions to the soil surrounding the tree should also be minimized. Any major disruptions, such as landscaping or irrigation modifications, in the surrounding environment can develop significant problems for both young and mature trees. Proper herbicides, pesticides, and fertilizers should be used in further tree protection. Additionally, adequate propagation along with good drainage is extremely important in sustaining a healthy tree.

Studies have found that Hypoxylon canker favors lower tree density stands in addition to only stressed trees. This could be due to the mode of spore dispersal, the inability of spores to germinate on older bark, the fungal method of entry, and the specific tree age. If possible, minimize forest thinning unless recommended by an arborist or qualified specialist.

When dead or dying tree branches do appear, selective pruning should be performed to remove these potential infection sources. The removal of dead or infected regions can prevent or considerably reduce advances of Hypoxylon.

== Importance ==
The most significant impact of Hypoxylon canker of shade trees is that the ascomycete fungal pathogen can contribute to the death of many species of tall, mature shade trees. This can have an economic impact, since many of these types of trees are used for aesthetic landscaping in residential and commercial areas.

There is also an ecological impact; specifically, Hypoxylon canker is most devastating to forest aspen trees. Aspen distribution in Utah, in National Forest System lands, has decreased by 60%. Though Hypoxylon is not the major cause of this decline, Hypoxylon mammatum is estimated to infect 30% of aspens each year across the Midwest. In 1972, the damage was significant enough to cause losses of $4 million worth of aspen across Wisconsin, Minnesota, and Michigan. Furthermore, severe drought conditions throughout the American West could exacerbate Hypoxylon damage to aspens since the fungus takes advantage of water stressed trees.

Overall, the loss of aspen or any other species of tall, mature shade trees can have a large impact on the surrounding ecosystem; these trees can serve as habitat for a variety of animals. Since Hypoxylon canker of shade trees is found throughout the United States, in regions such as the mountain West, coastal South, and Midwest/Great Lakes region, the preservation and protection of the host trees is particularly significant.
