= Pestalotiopsis arachidis =

Scientific classification
- Domain: Eukaryota
- Kingdom: Fungi
- Division: Ascomycota
- Class: Sordariomycetes
- Order: Amphisphaeriales
- Family: Sporocadaceae
- Genus: Pestalotiopsis
- Species: P. arachidis

Binomial name
- Pestalotiopsis arachidis Satya, (1964)

Species of fungus

Pestalotiopsis arachidis is a fungal plant pathogen infecting peanuts.
