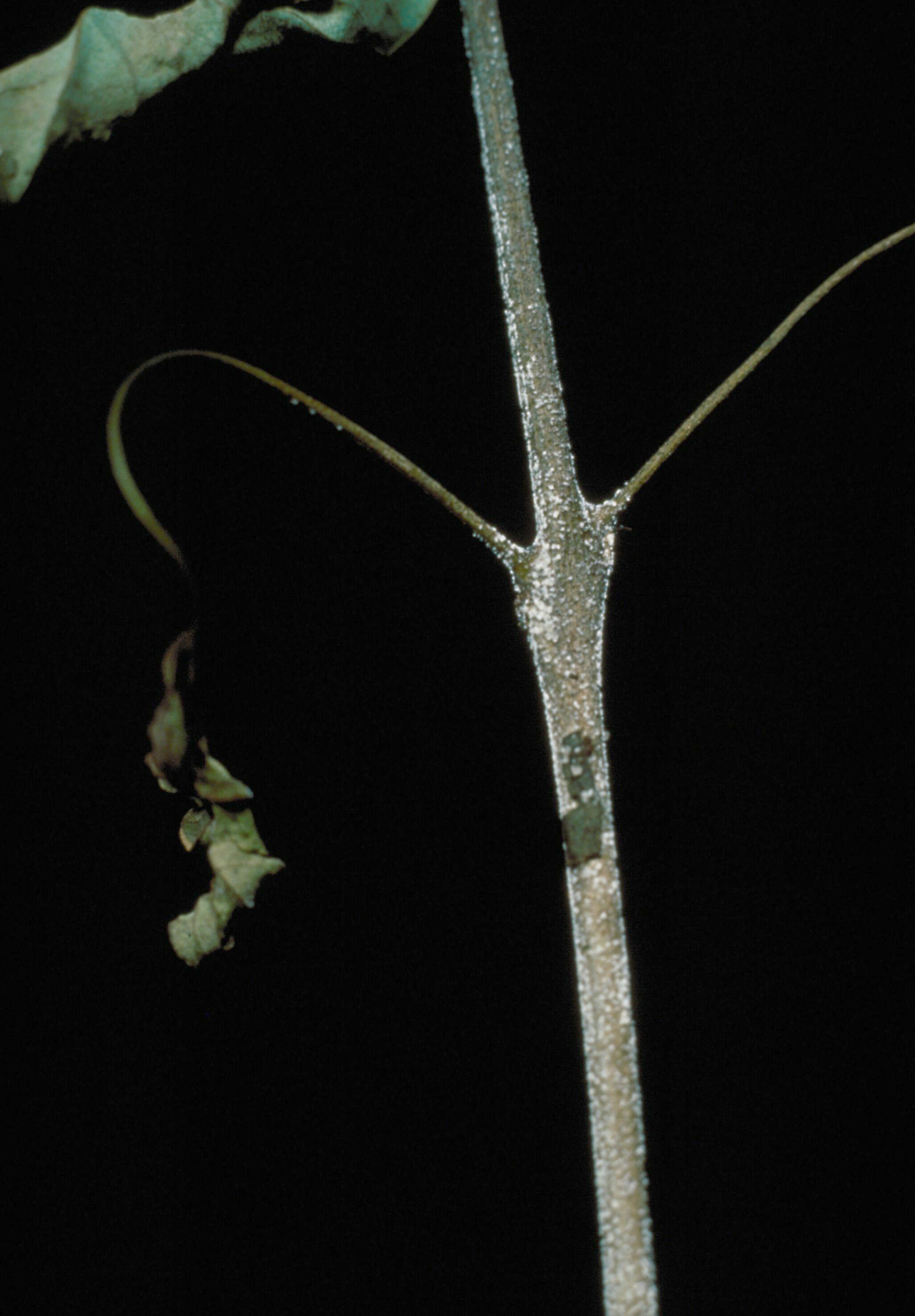
- Calonectria kyotensis sporing structures

Scientific classification
- Domain: Eukaryota
- Kingdom: Fungi
- Division: Ascomycota
- Class: Sordariomycetes
- Order: Hypocreales
- Family: Nectriaceae
- Genus: Calonectria; De Not. (1867)

Type species
- Calonectria daldiniana De Not. (1867)

Species
- See text

= Calonectria =

Genus of fungi

Calonectria (anamorph Cylindrocladium) is a genus of ascomycete fungi. Calonectria species are plant pathogens.

== Species ==
- Calonectria acicola
- Calonectria adianti
- Calonectria agnina
- Calonectria ambigua
- Calonectria angustata
- Calonectria apoensis
- Calonectria appendiculata
- Calonectria asiatica
- Calonectria atkinsonii
- Calonectria aurea
- Calonectria aurigera
- Calonectria australiensis
- Calonectria avesiculata
- Calonectria bahiensis
- Calonectria balanseana
- Calonectria balansiae
- Calonectria bambusina
- Calonectria belonospora
- Calonectria blumenaviae
- Calonectria brachiatica
- Calonectria brasiliensis
- Calonectria brassicae
- Calonectria bryophila
- Calonectria callorioides
- Calonectria camelinae
- Calonectria canadensis
- Calonectria capensis
- Calonectria celata
- Calonectria cephalosporii
- Calonectria cerciana
- Calonectria chinensis
- Calonectria chlorinella
- Calonectria chorleyi
- Calonectria ciliata
- Calonectria cinnabarina
- Calonectria circumposita
- Calonectria citri
- Calonectria clavata
- Calonectria coccidophaga
- Calonectria coffeae
- Calonectria colhounii
- Calonectria collapsa
- Calonectria colombiana
- Calonectria colombiensis
- Calonectria copelandii
- Calonectria coralloides
- Calonectria cremea
- Calonectria curtisii
- Calonectria curvata
- Calonectria curvispora
- Calonectria cyathula
- Calonectria dearnessii
- Calonectria densa
- Calonectria diminuta
- Calonectria dolichospora
- Calonectria duplicella
- Calonectria ecuadoriae
- Calonectria ecuadorica
- Calonectria effugiens
- Calonectria equiseti
- Calonectria erysiphoides
- Calonectria erythrina
- Calonectria eucalypti
- Calonectria eucalyptina
- Calonectria ferruginea
- Calonectria fimbriata
- Calonectria flavitecta
- Calonectria frullaniae
- Calonectria fuckelii
- Calonectria fulvida
- Calonectria geralensis
- Calonectria gigaspora
- Calonectria gordoniae
- Calonectria gracilipes
- Calonectria gracilis
- Calonectria granulosa
- Calonectria guarapiensis
- Calonectria gyalectoidea
- Calonectria gymnosporangii
- Calonectria hawksworthii
- Calonectria hederiseda
- Calonectria hendrickxii
- Calonectria henricotiae
- Calonectria hibiscicola
- Calonectria hippocastani
- Calonectria hirsutellae
- Calonectria hoehneliana
- Calonectria hongkongensis
- Calonectria humicola
- Calonectria hurae
- Calonectria ignota
- Calonectria ilicicola
- Calonectria inconspicua
- Calonectria indonesiae
- Calonectria indusiata
- Calonectria insularis
- Calonectria intermixta
- Calonectria jasmini
- Calonectria javanica
- Calonectria jimenezii
- Calonectria kampalensis
- Calonectria kurdica
- Calonectria kyotensis
- Calonectria lacustris
- Calonectria lagerheimiana
- Calonectria leguminum
- Calonectria leightonii
- Calonectria leucophaës
- Calonectria leucorrhodina
- Calonectria leucothoës
- Calonectria levieuxii
- Calonectria limpida
- Calonectria longisetosa
- Calonectria luteofusca
- Calonectria macroconidialis
- Calonectria madagascariensis
- Calonectria malesiana
- Calonectria mangiferae
- Calonectria massariae
- Calonectria meliae
- Calonectria meliolae
- Calonectria melioloides
- Calonectria mellina
- Calonectria mexicana
- Calonectria mindoensis
- Calonectria minuscula
- Calonectria minutissima
- Calonectria moravica
- Calonectria morganii
- Calonectria multiphialidica
- Calonectria multiseptata
- Calonectria muscicola
- Calonectria naviculata
- Calonectria novae-zelandiae
- Calonectria obtecta
- Calonectria obvoluta
- Calonectria olivacea
- Calonectria oodes
- Calonectria opalina
- Calonectria ophiospora
- Calonectria orientalis
- Calonectria ornata
- Calonectria oudemansii
- Calonectria ovata
- Calonectria pacifica
- Calonectria parasitica
- Calonectria pauciramosa
- Calonectria pellucida
- Calonectria penicilloides
- Calonectria perpusilla
- Calonectria phycophora
- Calonectria pini
- Calonectria pini-caribaeae
- Calonectria pithecoctenii
- Calonectria platasca
- Calonectria polizzii
- Calonectria polythalama
- Calonectria pruinosa
- Calonectria pseudonaviculata
- Calonectria pseudoreteaudii
- Calonectria pseudoscoparia
- Calonectria pseudospathiphylli
- Calonectria pteridis
- Calonectria pyrochroa
- Calonectria pyrrhochlora
- Calonectria queenslandica
- Calonectria quinqueseptata
- Calonectria rajasthanensis
- Calonectria rehmiana
- Calonectria reteaudii
- Calonectria richonii
- Calonectria rubiginosa
- Calonectria rubropunctata
- Calonectria rumohrae
- Calonectria rutila
- Calonectria sasae
- Calonectria sceptri
- Calonectria scoparia
- Calonectria sensitiva
- Calonectria soroceae
- Calonectria spathiphylli
- Calonectria squamulosa
- Calonectria sulawesiensis
- Calonectria sumatrensis
- Calonectria tarvisina
- Calonectria terrae-reginae
- Calonectria tessellata
- Calonectria trichiliae
- Calonectria truncata
- Calonectria tubaraoënsis
- Calonectria ugandae
- Calonectria ukolayi
- Calonectria ulicis
- Calonectria unicaudata
- Calonectria uredinophila
- Calonectria variabilis
- Calonectria varians
- Calonectria vernoniae
- Calonectria volutella
- Calonectria warburgiana
- Calonectria xantholeuca
- Calonectria zuluensis
