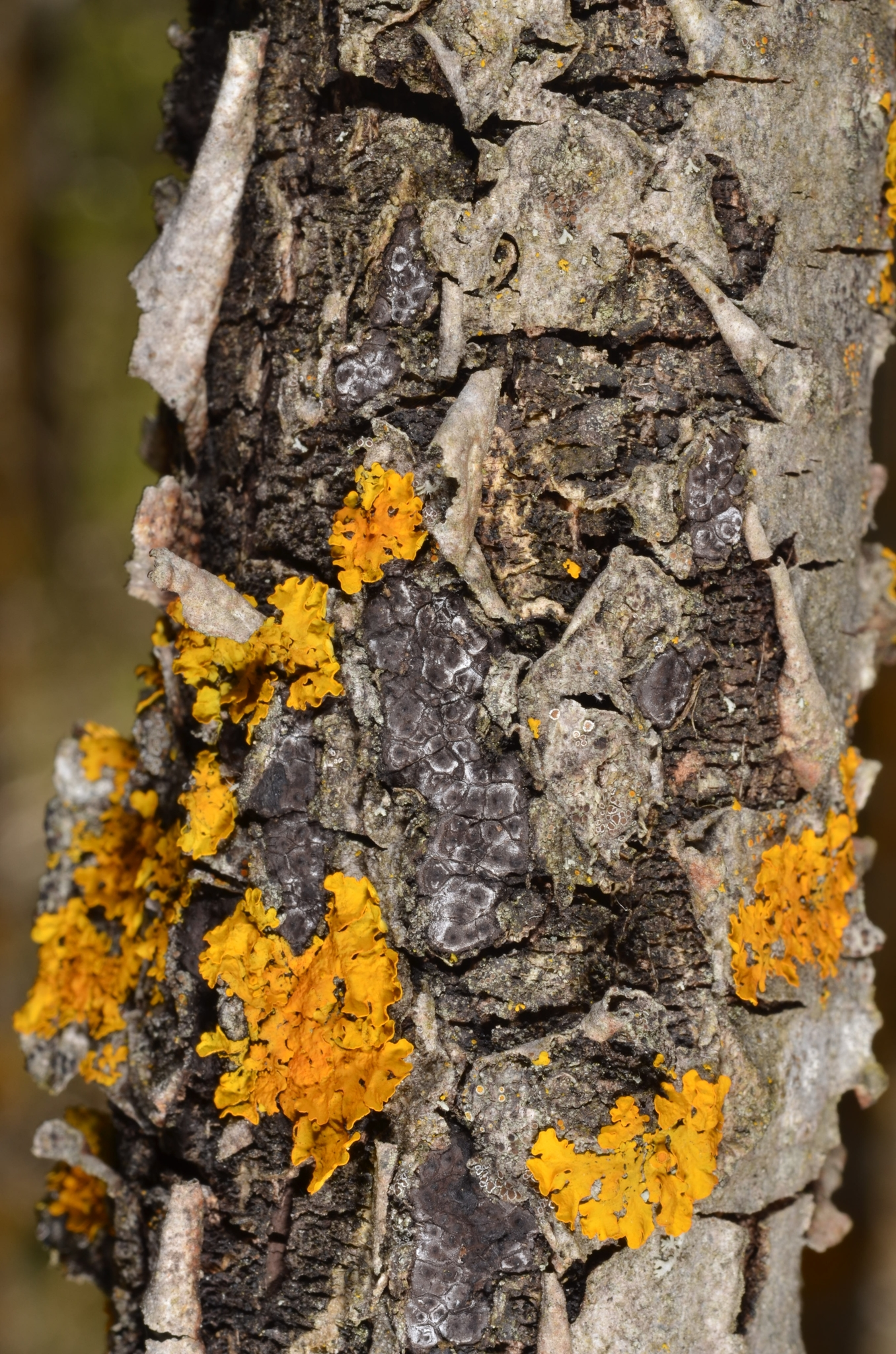

Scientific classification
- Kingdom: Fungi
- Division: Ascomycota
- Class: Sordariomycetes
- Order: Xylariales
- Family: Xylariaceae
- Genus: Entoleuca
- Species: E. mammata

Binomial name
- Entoleuca mammata (Wahlenb.) J.D.Rogers & Y.M.Ju (1996)

Synonyms
- Anthostoma blakei (Berk. & M.A. Curtis) C.F. Reed{?} & D.F. Farr (1993); Anthostoma morsei (Berk. & M.A. Curtis) Cooke (1883); Fuckelia morsei (Berk. & M.A. Curtis) Cooke (1885); Hypoxylon blakei Berk. & M.A. Curtis (1875); Hypoxylon holwayi Ellis (1883); Hypoxylon mammatum (Wahlenb.) P. Karst. (1866); Hypoxylon morsei Berk. & M.A. Curtis (1875); Hypoxylon pauperatum P. Karst. (1873); Hypoxylon pruinatum (Klotzsch) Cooke (1883); Nemania mammata (Wahlenb.) Granmo (1995); Rosellinia pruinata (Klotzsch) Sacc. (1882); Sphaeria mammata Wahlenb. (1826); Sphaeria pruinata Klotzsch (1833)

= Entoleuca mammata =

Species of fungus

Entoleuca mammata is a species of fungus in the family Xylariaceae. It is responsible for the plant disease hypoxylon canker in hardwood trees such as quaking aspen (Populus tremuloides) and other aspens and poplars, Salix myrsinifolia and other willow species, rowan (Sorbus aucuparia), Sitka alder (Alnus viridis), birch (Betula spp.), apple (Malus spp.), oak (Quercus spp.), and hop-hornbeam (Ostrya spp.).

== See also ==
- Hypoxylon canker of shade trees
