= Gloeosporium theae-sinensis =

Scientific classification
- Kingdom: Fungi
- Division: Ascomycota
- Class: Leotiomycetes
- Order: Helotiales
- Family: Dermateaceae
- Genus: Gloeosporium
- Species: G. theae-sinensis

Binomial name
- Gloeosporium theae-sinensis T. Miyake [as 'theae-sinense'], (1907)

Species of fungus

Gloeosporium theae-sinensis (syn. Colletotrichum theae-sinensis) is a plant pathogen.
