= Calonectria quinqueseptata =

Scientific classification
- Kingdom: Fungi
- Division: Ascomycota
- Class: Sordariomycetes
- Order: Hypocreales
- Family: Nectriaceae
- Genus: Calonectria
- Species: C. quinqueseptata

Binomial name
- Calonectria quinqueseptata Figueiredo & Namek. (1967)

Species of fungus

Calonectria quinqueseptata is a fungal plant pathogen. It was described from leaf spots in Annona squamosa found in Brazil.
