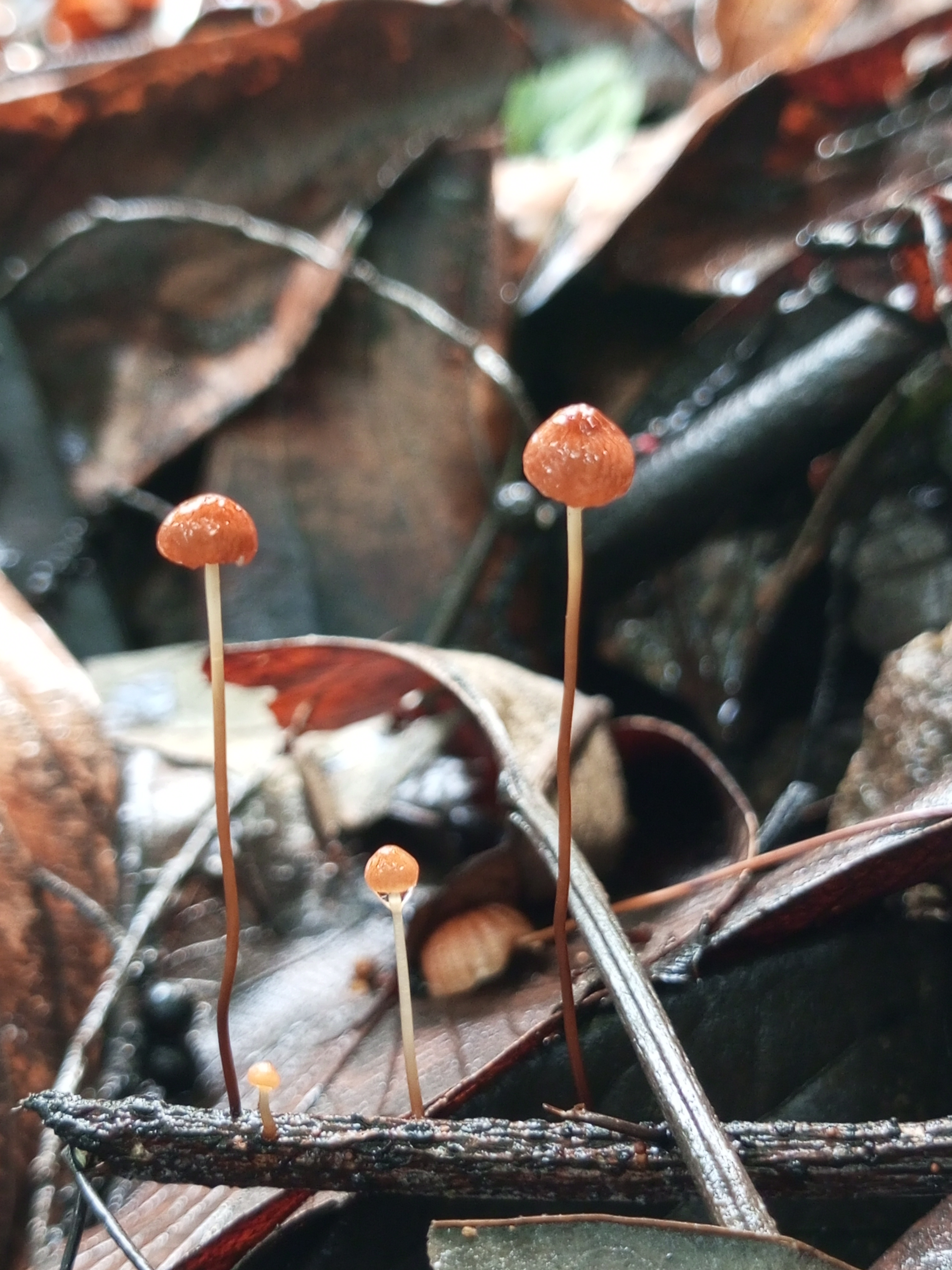

Scientific classification
- Kingdom: Fungi
- Division: Basidiomycota
- Class: Agaricomycetes
- Order: Agaricales
- Family: Marasmiaceae
- Genus: Marasmius
- Species: M. crinis-equi

Binomial name
- Marasmius crinis-equi F.Muell. ex Kalchbr. (1880)

Synonyms
- Marasmius equicrinis F.Muell. ex Berk. (1880); Marasmius repens Henn. (1897); Androsaceus crinis-equi (F.Muell. ex Kalchbr.) Overeem (1927); Marasmius graminum var. equicrinis (F.Muell. ex Berk.) Dennis (1951); Marasmius trichorhizus Speg. [as 'trichorrhizus']

= Marasmius crinis-equi =

Species of fungus

Marasmius crinis-equi is a species of fungi in the family Marasmiaceae, being a plant pathogen. It is commonly known as the 'horse hair fungus', and appears on rainforest leaves as a wiry stipe with a delicate fruitbody. The cap of the fruitbody can be up to 4 mm in diameter, and is pale brown.

== See also ==
- List of Marasmius species
