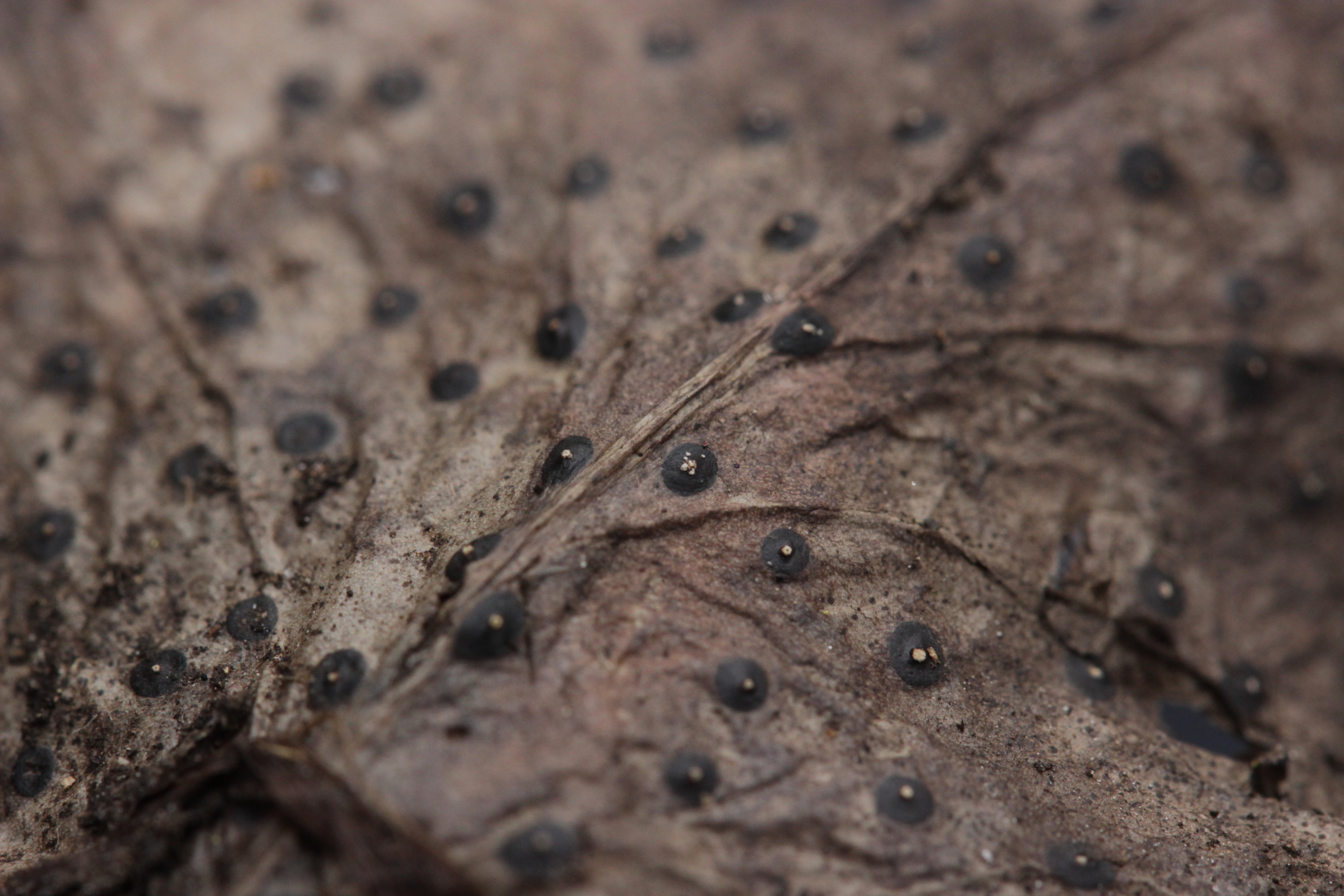

Scientific classification
- Kingdom: Fungi
- Division: Ascomycota
- Class: Leotiomycetes
- Order: Phacidiales
- Family: Phacidiaceae
- Genus: Phacidium
- Species: P. lauri

Binomial name
- Phacidium lauri (Sowerby) Crous & D. Hawksw.

Synonyms
- Ceuthospora lauri Grev.

= Phacidium lauri =

Species of fungus

Phacidium lauri is a plant pathogen.
