= Phaeosphaerella theae =

Scientific classification
- Kingdom: Fungi
- Division: Ascomycota
- Class: Dothideomycetes
- Order: Venturiales
- Family: Venturiaceae
- Genus: Phaeosphaerella
- Species: P. theae

Binomial name
- Phaeosphaerella theae Petch

Species of fungus

Phaeosphaerella theae is a fungal plant pathogen infecting causing leaf spot in tea plants.
