= Gliocladiopsis tenuis =

Scientific classification
- Kingdom: Fungi
- Division: Ascomycota
- Class: Sordariomycetes
- Order: Hypocreales
- Family: Nectriaceae
- Genus: Gliocladiopsis
- Species: G. tenuis

Binomial name
- Gliocladiopsis tenuis (Bugnic.) Crous & M.J.Wingf. (1993)

Synonyms
- Cylindrocarpon tenue Bugnic. (1939); Cylindrocladium tenue (Bugnic.) T.Watan. (1994); Gliocladiopsis sagariensis S.B.Saksena (1954)

Species of fungus

Gliocladiopsis tenuis is a fungal plant pathogen. It is found in Vietnam.
