= Pestalotiopsis adusta =

Scientific classification
- Kingdom: Fungi
- Division: Ascomycota
- Class: Sordariomycetes
- Order: Amphisphaeriales
- Family: Sporocadaceae
- Genus: Pestalotiopsis
- Species: P. adusta

Binomial name
- Pestalotiopsis adusta (Ellis & Everh.) Steyaert

Synonyms
- Pestalotia adusta Ellis & Everh., (1888)

Species of fungus

Pestalotiopsis adusta is a fungal plant pathogen infecting tea and avocados.
