= Calonectria colhounii =

Scientific classification
- Kingdom: Fungi
- Division: Ascomycota
- Class: Sordariomycetes
- Order: Hypocreales
- Family: Nectriaceae
- Genus: Calonectria
- Species: C. colhounii

Binomial name
- Calonectria colhounii Peerally (1973)

Synonyms
- Cylindrocladium colhounii Peerally (1973)

Species of fungus

Calonectria colhounii is a fungal plant pathogen. It is known to cause blight in Leucospermum.
