= Macrophoma theicola =

Scientific classification
- Kingdom: Fungi
- Division: Ascomycota
- Class: Dothideomycetes
- Order: Botryosphaeriales
- Family: Botryosphaeriaceae
- Genus: Macrophoma
- Species: M. theicola

Binomial name
- Macrophoma theicola Siemaszko (1917)

Species of fungus

Macrophoma theicola is a plant pathogen affecting Camellia sinensis, the tea plant, which is capable of reducing yields or killing plants altogether. Early symptoms include the browning and drooping of leaves. It is spread most easily in wet, rainy conditions.
