= Cylindrocladium lanceolatum =

Scientific classification
- Domain: Eukaryota
- Kingdom: Fungi
- Division: Ascomycota
- Class: Sordariomycetes
- Order: Hypocreales
- Family: Nectriaceae
- Genus: Cylindrocladium
- Species: C. lanceolatum

Binomial name
- Cylindrocladium lanceolatum Peerally, (1972)

Species of fungus

Cylindrocladium lanceolatum is a fungal plant pathogen.
