= Entoleuca =

Scientific classification
- Domain: Eukaryota
- Kingdom: Fungi
- Division: Ascomycota
- Class: Sordariomycetes
- Order: Xylariales
- Family: Xylariaceae
- Genus: Entoleuca; Syd.

Type species
- Entoleuca callimorpha Syd.

Species
- Species include: Entoleuca callimorpha; Entoleuca ellisii; Entoleuca mammata

Genus of fungi in the family Xylariaceae

Entoleuca is a genus of fungi in the family Xylariaceae.
