= Poria hypobrunnea =

Scientific classification
- Domain: Eukaryota
- Kingdom: Fungi
- Division: Basidiomycota
- Class: Agaricomycetes
- Order: Polyporales
- Family: Polyporaceae
- Genus: Perenniporia
- Species: P. hypobrunnea

Binomial name
- Perenniporia hypobrunnea Petch, (1916)

Synonyms
- Rigidoporus hypobrunneus (Petch) Corner, (1987)

Fungal plant pathogen

Poria hypobrunnea is a plant pathogen infecting tea.
