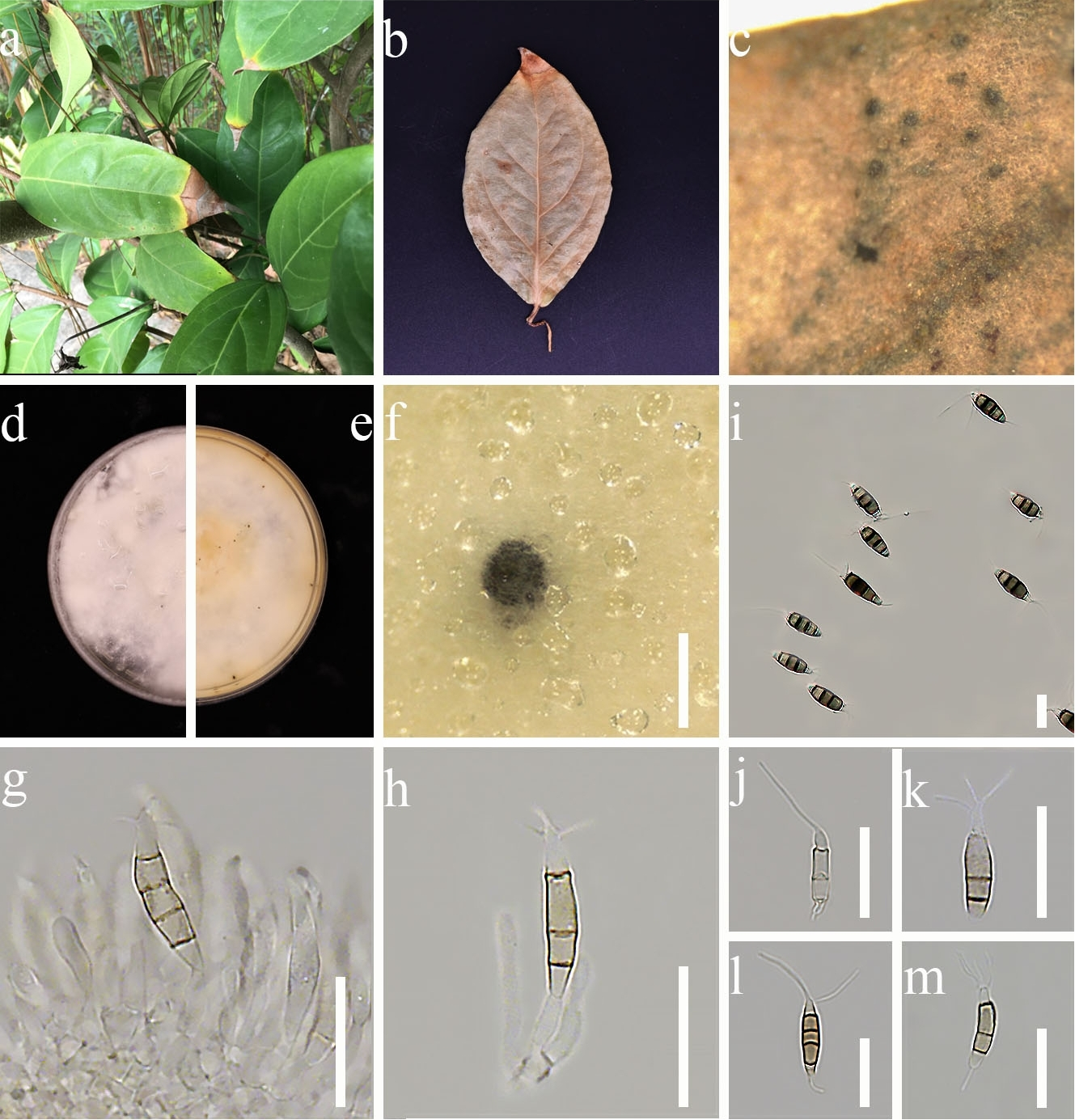
- Neopestalotiopsis saprophytica

Scientific classification
- Kingdom: Fungi
- Division: Ascomycota
- Class: Sordariomycetes
- Order: Amphisphaeriales
- Family: Sporocadaceae
- Genus: Neopestalotiopsis; Maharachchikumbura et al. (2014)

Type species
- Neopestalotiopsis protearum (Crous & L. Swart) Maharachch., K.D. Hyde & Crous

= Neopestalotiopsis =

Genus of fungi

Neopestalotiopsis is a genus of plant pathogens in the family Sporocadaceae.

The genus was published by Maharachch., K.D. Hyde & Crous in Studies in Mycology vol.79 on page 135 in 2014. The type species is Neopestalotiopsis protearum (Crous & L. Swart) Maharachch., K.D. Hyde & Crous.

It was named after its morphological similarity to Pestalotiopsis.

Neopestalotiopsis is widespread, occurring as saprobes or pathogens on various host plants (Maharachchikumbura et al. 2014, Farr & Rossman 2019). The genus is distinct from Pestalotiopsis in having versicolourous median cells. The conidia is either composed of two upper median cells that are darker than the lowest median cell and they have indistinct conidiophores.

It was originally placed in family Pestalotiopsidaceae before that was absorbed into the family Sporocadaceae. Jaklitsch et al. (2016), synonymised Bartaliniaceae, Discosiaceae, Pestalotiopsidaceae and Robillardaceae, and then revived the older family name of Sporocadaceae to accommodate them (Crous et al. 2015). Pestalotiopsidaceae is still sometimes used.

== Hosts ==
Species within this group commonly occurs on plants as endophytes, pathogens or saprobes (Jeewon et al. 2004, Liu et al. 2010, Hyde et al. 2016, Reddy et al. 2016, Shetty et al. 2016, Ran et al. 2017, Bezerra et al. 2018, Freitas et al. 2019). Current research showed them as plant pathogens causing stem blight, flower blight, twig dieback and fruit rot (Akinsanmi et al. 2016, Borrero et al. 2017, Mahapatra et al. 2018, Rodríguez-Gálvez et al. 2020). In the past few years, China and Thailand are places where most species of Neopestalotiopsis were found (Norphanphoun et al. 2019). Pestalotiopsis-like fungi are widely distributed in many plants and include endophytes, pathogens and saprobes. Five strains of Neopestalotiopsis were isolated from diseased leaves of Rhapis excelsa (Principes, Palmae), Rhododendron simsii and Rhododendron championiae (Ericales, Ericaceae) and Erythropalum scandens, (Santalales, Olacaceae) in southern China. Species Neopestalotiopsis clavispora has been found on the fallen leaves of Quercus rubra in Auburn, Alabama in USA, and on the dead leaves of species of Magnolia in Guangxi Province, China. It was found that Neopestalotiopsis clavispora causes leaf blight on strawberry (Fragaria × ananassa Duch) in Wisconsin, USA. In 2021, Neopestalotiopsis spp. were found causing leaf spot and fruit rot on strawberry in Florida, USA. In China, Neopestalotiopsis brasiliensis and Neopestalotiopsis asiatica have been found on the diseased leaves of Castanea mollissima.

Species Neopestalotiopsis hadrolaeliae was found growing from the roots of the endangered orchid Hadrolaelia jongheana in Brazil. In 2019, Neopestalotiopsis alpapicalis was found growing on the tropical mangrove trees in Krabi Province in Thailand.

Blueberries (Vaccinium corymbosum) which are cultivated in Portugal, are known to be susceptible to twig blight and dieback which is caused by 'pestalotioid fungi', which included Pestalotiopsis australis, Pestalotiopsis biciliata, Pestalotiopsis chamaeropis, Neopestalotiopsis rosae and three novel species described as Neopestalotiopsis scalabiensis, Neopestalotiopsis vaccinii and Neopestalotiopsis vacciniicola.

In 2021, new species were found in Thailand, Neopestalotiopsis hydeana and Pestalotiopsis hydei which caused leaf spots and fruit rots on Alpinia malaccensis, Alpinia galangal, Annona squamosa, Artocarpus heterophyllus, Garcinia mangostana, Litsea petiolata, Vitis vinifera and various Citrus sp. in Chiang Rai, Thailand.

Pestalotia, a leaf spot and fruit rot disease which is caused by various species of Neopestalotiopsis was first observed in Florida in 1972 and was considered a secondary pathogen. However, in 2021 outbreaks have been more severe, signifying that a more virulent strain of Neopestalotiopsis is around. It was reported in Georgia for the first time in 2020. It affects the roots, crown, leaves, and the fruit of strawberry plants and can cause the complete collapse (or death) of the plant. The disease thrives in rainy conditions in a temperature range of 50 °F – 86 °F. The subsequent decline and collapse of infected plants is similar to the damage caused by Phytophthora root and crown rot. The distinguishing characteristic of the fungus, is fungal fruiting structures present on the surface of fruit and foliar lesions (leaf spots) that resemble black pepper. The fungal disease can remain in the field once it is introduced, an indication that it may overwinter on other host plants.

== Distribution ==
It has a widespread and cosmopolitan distribution. This includes Brazil, Mexico, Peru, Florida, USA, Alabama, USA, Georgia, USA, Portugal, India, Sri Lanka, China, Thailand. New Zealand, and Australia.

== Species ==
Up to 2022, 49 taxa of Neopestalotiopsis were known. But more have been added. Current species list as accepted by Species Fungorum;

- Neopestalotiopsis acrostichi Norphanphoun, T.C. Wen & K.D. Hyde (2020)
- Neopestalotiopsis alpapicalis Vin. Kumar, Gentekaki & K.D. Hyde (2019)
- Neopestalotiopsis amomi Y.R. Sun & Yong Wang bis (2023)
- Neopestalotiopsis aotearoa Maharachch., K.D. Hyde & Crous (2014)
- Neopestalotiopsis asiatica (Maharachch. & K.D. Hyde) Maharachch., K.D. Hyde & Crous (2014)
- Neopestalotiopsis australis Maharachch., K.D. Hyde & Crous (2014)
- Neopestalotiopsis brachiata Norphanphoun, T.C. Wen & K.D. Hyde (2020)
- Neopestalotiopsis brasiliensis V.P. Abreu, A.W.C. Rosado & O.L. Pereira (2018)
- Neopestalotiopsis camelliae-oleiferae Qin Yang & He Li (2021)
- Neopestalotiopsis cavernicola Karun., Tibpromma & X.F. Liu (2021)
- Neopestalotiopsis chiangmaiensis Tibpromma & K.D. Hyde (2018)
- Neopestalotiopsis chrysea (Maharachch. & K.D. Hyde) Maharachch., K.D. Hyde & Crous (2014)
- Neopestalotiopsis clavispora (G.F. Atk.) Maharachch., K.D. Hyde & Crous (2014)
- Neopestalotiopsis cocoes Norph. & K.D. Hyde (2016)
- Neopestalotiopsis cubana Maharachch., K.D. Hyde & Crous (2014)
- Neopestalotiopsis dendrobii X.Y. Ma, K.D. Hyde & J.C. Kang (2019)
- Neopestalotiopsis drenthii Prasannath, Akinsanmi & R.G. Shivas (2021)
- Neopestalotiopsis egyptiaca A.M. Ismail, G. Perrone & Crous (2015)
- Neopestalotiopsis elaeidis Konta & K.D. Hyde (2023)
- Neopestalotiopsis ellipsospora (Maharachch. & K.D. Hyde) Maharachch., K.D. Hyde & Crous (2014)
- Neopestalotiopsis eucalypticola Maharachch., K.D. Hyde & Crous (2014)
- Neopestalotiopsis eucalyptorum E. Diogo, M.H. Bragança & A.J.L. Phillips (2021)
- Neopestalotiopsis foedans (Sacc. & Ellis) Maharachch., K.D. Hyde & Crous (2014)
- Neopestalotiopsis formicidarum Maharachch., K.D. Hyde & Crous (2014)
- Neopestalotiopsis fragariae Prematunga & Jayaward (2022)
- Neopestalotiopsis guajavae I.U. Haq, S. Ijaz & N.A. Khan (2021)
- Neopestalotiopsis guajavicola I.U. Haq, S. Ijaz & N.A. Khan (2021)
- Neopestalotiopsis hadrolaeliae E.F.S. Freitas, Meir. Silva & M.C.M. Kasuya (2019)
- Neopestalotiopsis hispanica E. Diogo, M.H. Bragança & A.J.L. Phillips (2021)
- Neopestalotiopsis honoluluana Maharachch., K.D. Hyde & Crous (2014)
- Neopestalotiopsis hydeana Huanraluek & Jayaward. (2021)
- Neopestalotiopsis hyperici Y.R. Sun & Yong Wang bis (2023)
- Neopestalotiopsis iberica E. Diogo, M.H. Bragança & A.J.L. Phillips (2021)
- Neopestalotiopsis iranensis Ayoubi & Soleimani (2016)
- Neopestalotiopsis javaensis Maharachch., K.D. Hyde & Crous (2014)
- Neopestalotiopsis longiappendiculata E. Diogo, M.H. Bragança & A.J.L. Phillips (2021)
- Neopestalotiopsis lusitanica E. Diogo, M.H. Bragança & A.J.L. Phillips (2021)
- Neopestalotiopsis macadamiae R.G. Shivas & Akinsanmi (2016)
- Neopestalotiopsis maddoxii Prasannath, Akinsanmi & R.G. Shivas (2021)
- Neopestalotiopsis magna (Maharachch. & K.D. Hyde) Maharachch., K.D. Hyde & Crous (2014)
- Neopestalotiopsis mesopotamica Maharachch., K.D. Hyde & Crous (2014)
- Neopestalotiopsis musae Norph. & K.D. Hyde (2016)
- Neopestalotiopsis natalensis (J.F.H. Beyma) Maharachch., K.D. Hyde & Crous (2014)
- Neopestalotiopsis nebuloides C. Lock, Vitelli, Holdom, Y.P. Tan & R.G. Shivas (2020)
- Neopestalotiopsis olumideae Prasannath, Akinsanmi & R.G. Shivas (2021)
- Neopestalotiopsis pandanicola Tibpromma & K.D. Hyde (2018)
- Neopestalotiopsis pernambucana Silvério, M.A.Q. Cavalc. & J.L. Bezerra (2016)
- Neopestalotiopsis perukae I.U. Haq, S. Ijaz & N.A. Khan (2021)
- Neopestalotiopsis petila Norphanphoun, T.C. Wen & K.D. Hyde (2020)
- Neopestalotiopsis phangngaensis Tibpromma & K.D. Hyde (2018)
- Neopestalotiopsis photiniae Y.R. Sun & Yong Wang bis (2023)
- Neopestalotiopsis piceana Maharachch., K.D. Hyde & Crous (2014)
- Neopestalotiopsis protearum (Crous & L. Swart) Maharachch., K.D. Hyde & Crous (2014)
- Neopestalotiopsis psidii I.U. Haq, S. Ijaz & N.A. Khan (2021)
- Neopestalotiopsis rhapidis Qi Yang & Yong Wang bis (2021)
- Neopestalotiopsis rhizophorae Norphanphoun, T.C. Wen & K.D. Hyde (2020)
- Neopestalotiopsis rhododendri Qi Yang & Yong Wang bis (2021)
- Neopestalotiopsis rosae Maharachch., K.D. Hyde & Crous (2014)
- Neopestalotiopsis rosicola C.M. Tian & N. Jiang (2018)
- Neopestalotiopsis samarangensis (Maharachch. & K.D. Hyde) Maharachch., K.D. Hyde & Crous (2014)
- Neopestalotiopsis saprophytica (Maharachch. & K.D. Hyde) Maharachch., K.D. Hyde & Crous (2014)
- Neopestalotiopsis scalabiensis J. Santos, S. Hilário & A. Alves (2021)
- Neopestalotiopsis sichuanensis C.M. Tian & N. Jiang (2021)
- Neopestalotiopsis sonneratiae Norphanphoun, T.C. Wen & K.D. Hyde (2020)
- Neopestalotiopsis steyaertii (Mordue) Maharachch., K.D. Hyde & Crous (2014)
- Neopestalotiopsis suphanburiensis Y.R. Sun & Yong Wang bis (2023)
- Neopestalotiopsis surinamensis Maharachch., K.D. Hyde & Crous (2014)
- Neopestalotiopsis thailandica Norphanphoun & K.D. Hyde (2020)
- Neopestalotiopsis umbrinospora (Maharachch. & K.D. Hyde) Maharachch., K.D. Hyde & Crous (2014)
- Neopestalotiopsis vaccinii J. Santos, S. Hilário & A. Alves (2021)
- Neopestalotiopsis vacciniicola J. Santos, S. Hilário & A. Alves (2021)
- Neopestalotiopsis vheenae Prasannath, Akinsanmi & R.G. Shivas (2021)
- Neopestalotiopsis vitis Jayaward., Maharachch., J.Y. Yan, Xing H. Li & K.D. Hyde (2016)
- Neopestalotiopsis zakeelii Prasannath, Akinsanmi & R.G. Shivas (2021)
- Neopestalotiopsis zimbabwana Maharachch., K.D. Hyde & Crous (2014)
