= Nectricladiella viticola =

Scientific classification
- Kingdom: Fungi
- Division: Ascomycota
- Class: Sordariomycetes
- Order: Hypocreales
- Family: Nectriaceae
- Genus: Nectricladiella
- Species: N. camelliae

Binomial name
- Nectricladiella camelliae (Berk. & M.A. Curtis) Hirooka, Rossman & P. Chaverri, in Hirooka, Rossman, Samuels, Lechat & Chaverri

Synonyms
- Nectria viticola Berk. & M.A. Curtis; Dialonectria viticola (Berk. & M.A. Curtis) Cooke; Cucurbitaria viticola (Berk. & M.A. Curtis) Kuntze; Cylindrocladium camelliae Venkataram. & C.S.V. Ram; Cylindrocladiella camelliae (Venkataram. & C.S.V. Ram) Boesew.; Calonectria camelliae Shipton; Nectria camelliae (Shipton) Boesew.; Cosmospora camelliae (Shipton) Rossman & Samuels, in Rossman, Samuels, Rogerson & Lowen; Nectricladiella camelliae (Shipton) Crous & C.L. Schoch, in Schoch, Crous, Wingfield & Wingfield; Cylindrocladiella microcylindrica Crous & D. Victor, in Schoch, Crous, Wingfield & Wingfield

Species of fungus

Nectricladiella camelliae is a fungal plant pathogen that causes root rot in tea.
