= Kretzschmaria zonata =

Scientific classification
- Domain: Eukaryota
- Kingdom: Fungi
- Division: Ascomycota
- Class: Sordariomycetes
- Order: Xylariales
- Family: Xylariaceae
- Genus: Kretzschmaria
- Species: K. zonata

Binomial name
- Kretzschmaria zonata (Lév.) P.M.D. Martin, (1976)

Synonyms
- Hypoxylon deustum f. madagascariensis (Henn.) Hendr., (1948); Sphaeria zonata Lév., Annls Sci. Nat., (1845); Ustulina vulgaris f. madagascariensis Henn., (1908); Ustulina zonata (Lév.) Sacc., (1882)

Species of fungus

Kretzschmaria zonata is a plant pathogen.
