= Meloidogyne thamesi =

Scientific classification
- Domain: Eukaryota
- Kingdom: Animalia
- Phylum: Nematoda
- Class: Secernentea
- Order: Tylenchida
- Family: Heteroderidae
- Genus: Meloidogyne
- Species: M. thamesi

Binomial name
- Meloidogyne thamesi Chitwood in Chitwood, Specht & Havis, 1952

Synonyms
- Meloidogyne arenaria thamesi Chitwood in Chitwood, Specht & Havis, 1952

Species of roundworm

Meloidogyne thamesi, the Thames' root-knot nematode, is a plant pathogenic nematode (roundworm) infecting tea.

== See also ==
- List of tea diseases
