= Hendersonia theicola =

Scientific classification
- Domain: Eukaryota
- Kingdom: Fungi
- Division: Ascomycota
- Class: Dothideomycetes
- Order: Pleosporales
- Family: Phaeosphaeriaceae
- Genus: Hendersonia
- Species: H. theicola

Binomial name
- Hendersonia theicola Cooke

Species of fungus

Hendersonia theicola is a fungal plant pathogen.
