= Corticium invisum =

Scientific classification
- Domain: Eukaryota
- Kingdom: Fungi
- Division: Basidiomycota
- Class: Agaricomycetes
- Order: Corticiales
- Family: Corticiaceae
- Genus: Corticium
- Species: C. invisum

Binomial name
- Corticium invisum Petch (1925)

Species of fungus

Corticium invisum is a species of fungus in the class Agaricomycetes. It is a corticioid fungus and a plant pathogen, the causal agent of black rot of tea (Camellia sinensis), and was initially described from Sri Lanka. Corticium invisum has never been redescribed or reviewed and is unlikely to be a species of Corticium in the modern sense. Roberts (1999) referred Petch's original specimens to Ceratobasidium cornigerum.
