= Pestalotia longiseta =

Scientific classification
- Kingdom: Fungi
- Division: Ascomycota
- Class: Sordariomycetes
- Order: Amphisphaeriales
- Family: Amphisphaeriaceae
- Genus: Pestalotia
- Species: P. longiseta

Binomial name
- Pestalotia longiseta Speg. (1879)

Species of fungus

Pestalotia longiseta is a plant pathogen infecting tea.
