= Cylindrocladium clavatum =

Scientific classification
- Domain: Eukaryota
- Kingdom: Fungi
- Division: Ascomycota
- Class: Sordariomycetes
- Order: Hypocreales
- Family: Nectriaceae
- Genus: Cylindrocladium
- Species: C. clavatum

Binomial name
- Cylindrocladium clavatum Hodges & L.C. May, (1972)

Species of fungus

Cylindrocladium clavatum is a fungal plant pathogen.
