= Pestalotiopsis longiseta =

Scientific classification
- Kingdom: Fungi
- Division: Ascomycota
- Class: Sordariomycetes
- Order: Amphisphaeriales
- Family: Sporocadaceae
- Genus: Pestalotiopsis
- Species: P. longiseta

Binomial name
- Pestalotiopsis longiseta (Desm.) Steyaert, (1949)

Synonyms
- Pestalotia guepinii Desm., (1840)

Species of fungus

Pestalotiopsis longiseta is a fungal plant pathogen infecting tea.
