= Arenarius =

Arenarius may refer to:

- in ancient Rome, the class of people performing in the arena, see Arenarius (Rome)
- an alternate title of The Sand Reckoner

== See also ==
- Arenaria (disambiguation)
- Arenarium
