= List of rhododendron diseases =

This article is a list of diseases of rhododendron (Rhododendron spp.).

== Bacterial diseases ==
Bacterial diseases
Crown gall	Agrobacterium tumefaciens

== Fungal diseases ==
Fungal diseases
Armillaria root rot Shoestring root rot	Armillaria mellea Rhizomorpha subcorticalis [anamorph]
Botryosphaeria dieback	Botryosphaeria dothidea Fusicoccum aesculi [anamorph]
Botrytis leaf and petal blight	Botrytis cinerea Botryotinia fuckeliana [teleomorph]
Bud and twig blight	Pycnostysanus azaleae = Briosia azaleae
Cercospora leaf spot	Pseudocercospora handelii = Cercospora handelii
Chrysomyxa leaf rust	Chrysomyxa ledi var. rhododendri Chrysomyxa piperiana Chrysomyxa roanensis
Clitocybe root rot (mushroom root rot)	Armillaria tabescens = Clitocybe tabescens
Coryneum leaf spot	Seimatosporium rhododendri = Coryneum rhododendri
Cryptostictis leaf spot	Seimatosporium mariae = Cryptostictis mariae
Cylindrocarpon canker and wilt	Cylindrocarpon destructans = Cylindrocarpon radicicola
Damping-off, Pythium	Pythium spp.
Damping-off, Rhizoctonia	Rhizoctonia solani Thanatephorus cucumeris [teleomorph]
Exobasidium leaf spot	Exobasidium burtii
Glomerella canker and dieback	Glomerella cingulata Colletotrichum gloeosporioides [anamorph]
Gray blight	Pestalotia sydowiana
Leaf and flower gall	Exobasidium vaccinii = Exobasidium azaleae
Lophodermium leaf spot	Lophodermium schweinitzii
Ovulinia petal blight	Ovulinia azaleae Ovulitis azaleae [anamorph]
Pestalosphaeria leaf spot	Pestalosphaeria concentrica Pestalotiopsis guepini [anamorph]
Pestalotia leaf spot	Pestalotiopsis sydowiana = Pestalotia rhododendri
Phymatotrichum root rot (cotton root rot)	Phymatotrichopsis omnivora = Phymatotrichum omnivorum
Phytophthora dieback	Phytophthora nicotianae var. parasitica = Phytophthora parasitica Phytophthora cactorum Phytophthora cinnamomi Phytophthora citricola Phytophthora citrophthora Phytophthora heveae Phytophthora lateralis
Phytophthora root rot	Phytophthora cactorum Phytophthora cinnamomi Phytophthora citricola
Powdery mildew	Microsphaera vaccinii = Microsphaera penicillata var. vaccinii
Pucciniastrum leaf rust	Pucciniastrum vaccinii
Septoria leaf spot	Septoria rhododendri
Spot anthracnose	Sphaceloma sp.
Stem canker	Cylindrocladium theae Calonectria theae [teleomorph]
Witches' broom	Exobasidium vaccinii-uliginosi

== Nematodes, parasitic ==
Nematodes, parasitic
Dagger, American	Xiphinema americanum
Lance	Hoplalaimus galeatus
Sheath	Hemicycliophora spp.
Spiral	Helicotylenchus erythinae
Stubby-root	Paratrichodorus spp.
Stunt	Tylenchorhynchus claytoni

== Viral diseases ==
Viral diseases
Necrotic ringspot	Potato virus X group
