= List of azalea diseases =

This article is a list of diseases of azalea (Rhododendron spp.).

== Fungal diseases ==
Fungal diseases
Anthracnose	Glomerella cingulata Colletotrichum gloeosporioides [anamorph]
Armillaria root rot (shoestring root rot)	Armillaria mellea Rhizomorpha subcorticalis [anamorph]
Botrytis petal blight	Botrytis cinerea Botryotinia fuckeliana [teleomorph]
Bud and twig blight	Pycnostysanus azaleae = Briosia azaleae
Cercospora leaf spot	Pseudocercospora handelii = Cercospora handelii
Clitocybe root rot (mushroom root rot)	Armillaria tabescens = Clitocybe tabescens
Cylindrocladium blight and root rot	Cylindrocladium scoparium = Cylindrocladium floridanum Calonectria kyotensis [teleomorph] Cylindrocladium theae Calonectria theae [teleomorph]
Damping-off, Pythium	Pythium spp. Pythium irregulare
Damping-off, Rhizoctonia	Rhizoctonia solani Thanatephorus cucumeris [teleomorph]
Exobasidium leaf spot	Exobasidium burtii
Leaf scorch	Septoria azaleae
Leaf and flower gall	Exobasidium vaccinii = Exobasidium azaleae
Ovulinia petal blight	Ovulinia azaleae Ovulitis azaleae [anamorph]
Pestalotia leaf spot twig blight, and crown rot	Pestalotiopsis sydowiana = Pestalotia rhododendri
Phomopsis dieback	Phomopsis spp.
Phyllosticta leaf spot	Phyllosticta spp.
Phytophthora blight and dieback	Phytophthora nicotianae var. parasitica = Phytophthora parasitica
Phytophthora root rot and wilt	Phytophthora cinnamomi Phytophthora nicotianae var. parasitica
Powdery mildew	Erysiphe polygoni Microsphaera penicillata
Pucciniastrum leaf rust	Pucciniastrum vaccinii
Twig blight	Monilinia azaleae
Web blight	Rhizoctonia ramicola Ceratobasidium ramicola [teleomorph] Rhizoctonia sp. (binucleate)

== Nematodes, parasitic ==
Nematodes, parasitic
Dagger, American	Xiphinema americanum
Pin	Paratylenchus curvitatus
Root-knot	Meloidogyne spp.
Sheath	Hemicycliophora spp.
Spiral	Rotylenchus buxophilus R. robustus
Stubby-root	Paratrichodorus minor
Stunt	Tylenchorhynchus claytoni
