= List of foliage plant diseases (Arecaceae) =

This is a list of diseases of foliage plants belonging to the family Arecaceae.

== Plant Species ==
Plant Species
C	Caryota mitis	fishtail palm
Ch	Chamaedorea spp.	parlor palm, Florida hybrid palm
Ca	Chrysalidocarpus lutescens	Areca palm
H	Howea forsterana	Kentia palm
R	Rhapis excelsa	lady finger palm

== Bacterial diseases ==
Bacterial diseases
Common name	Scientific name	Plants affected
Bacterial leaf blight	Acidovorax avenae = Pseudomonas avenae	c

== Fungal diseases ==
Fungal diseases
Brown leaf spot	Pseudocercospora rhapisicola = Cercospora rhapidicola	R
Cylindrocladium leaf spot	Cylindrocladium spp.	H
Cylindrocladium leaf spot	Cylindrocladium crotalariae Calonectria crotalariae [teleomorph]	H
Cylindrocladium leaf spot	Cylindrocladium theae Calonectria theae [teleomorph]	H
Damping-off	Fusarium spp.	C, Ca, Ch, H, R
Damping-off	Pythium spp.	C, Ca, Ch, H, R
Gliocladium stem rot	Gliocladium vermoeseni	Ca, Ch
Helminthosporium leaf spot	Bipolaris setariae = Helminthosporium setariae = Cochliobolus setariae	H, R
Helminthosporium leaf spot	Exserohilum rostratum = Helminthosporium rostratum = Setosphaeria rostrata	C, Ca, Ch, H, R
Leaf spot	Phaeotrichoconis crotalariae	Ca
Lethal yellows	Mycoplasma-like organism (MLO)	C
Phytophthora stem rot and blight	Phytophthora spp.	Ch

== Nematodes, parasitic ==
Nematodes, parasitic
Burrowing nematode	Radopholus similis	Ch
Lesion nematodes	Pratylenchus spp.	Ch
