= C. theae =

C. theae can refer to a few different species. The specific epithet theae refers to tea, and many of the below are pathogens of the tea plant.

- Calonectria theae, a synonym of Calonectria indusiata, a fungal plant pathogen in the family Nectriaceae
- Candelospora theae, another synonym of C. indusiata, a fungal plant pathogen in the family Nectriaceae
- Candida theae, a yeast in the family Saccharomycetaceae found in some fermented beverages
- Capnodium theae, a fungal plant pathogen in the family Capnodiaceae
- Cercoseptoria theae, a synonym of Pseudocercospora theae, a fungal plant pathogen in the family Mycosphaerellaceae
- Cercospora theae, another synonym of C. indusiata, a fungal plant pathogen in the family Mycosphaerellaceae
- Cercosporella theae, a fungus in the family Mycosphaerellaceae
- Chanohirata theae, a leafhopper in the family Cicadellidae
- Coccotrypes theae, a bark beetle in the family Curculionidae
- Coenogonium theae, a lichen in the family Coenogoniaceae
- Coniothyrium theae, a sac fungus in the family Leptosphaeriaceae
- Corticium theae, a fungal plant pathogen in the family Corticiaceae
- Cotesia theae, a braconid wasp in the family Braconidae
- Cryptomyces theae, a fungus in the family Rhytismataceae
- Cryptospora theae, a fungus in the family Gnomoniaceae
- Cylindrocladium theae, another synonym of C. indusiata, a fungal plant pathogen in the family Nectriaceae
- Cytospora theae, a fungus in the family Valsaceae
