= Capnodium footii =

Scientific classification
- Kingdom: Fungi
- Division: Ascomycota
- Class: Dothideomycetes
- Order: Capnodiales
- Family: Capnodiaceae
- Genus: Capnodium
- Species: C. footii

Binomial name
- Capnodium footii Berk. & Desm., (1849)

Synonyms
- Microxiphium footii (Harv.{?} ex Berk. & Desm.) Thüm. Microxyphium footii (Berk. & Desm.) Speg., (1918)

Species of fungus

Capnodium footii is a sooty mold that develops in coconut leaves.
