= Capnodium mangiferae =

Scientific classification
- Domain: Eukaryota
- Kingdom: Fungi
- Division: Ascomycota
- Class: Dothideomycetes
- Order: Capnodiales
- Family: Capnodiaceae
- Genus: Capnodium
- Species: C. mangiferae

Binomial name
- Capnodium mangiferae Cooke, (1876)

Synonyms
- Dimersporium mangiferum Sacc., (1882)

Species of fungus

Capnodium mangiferae is a plant pathogen that causes mango black blight, forming black patches on mango leaves.
