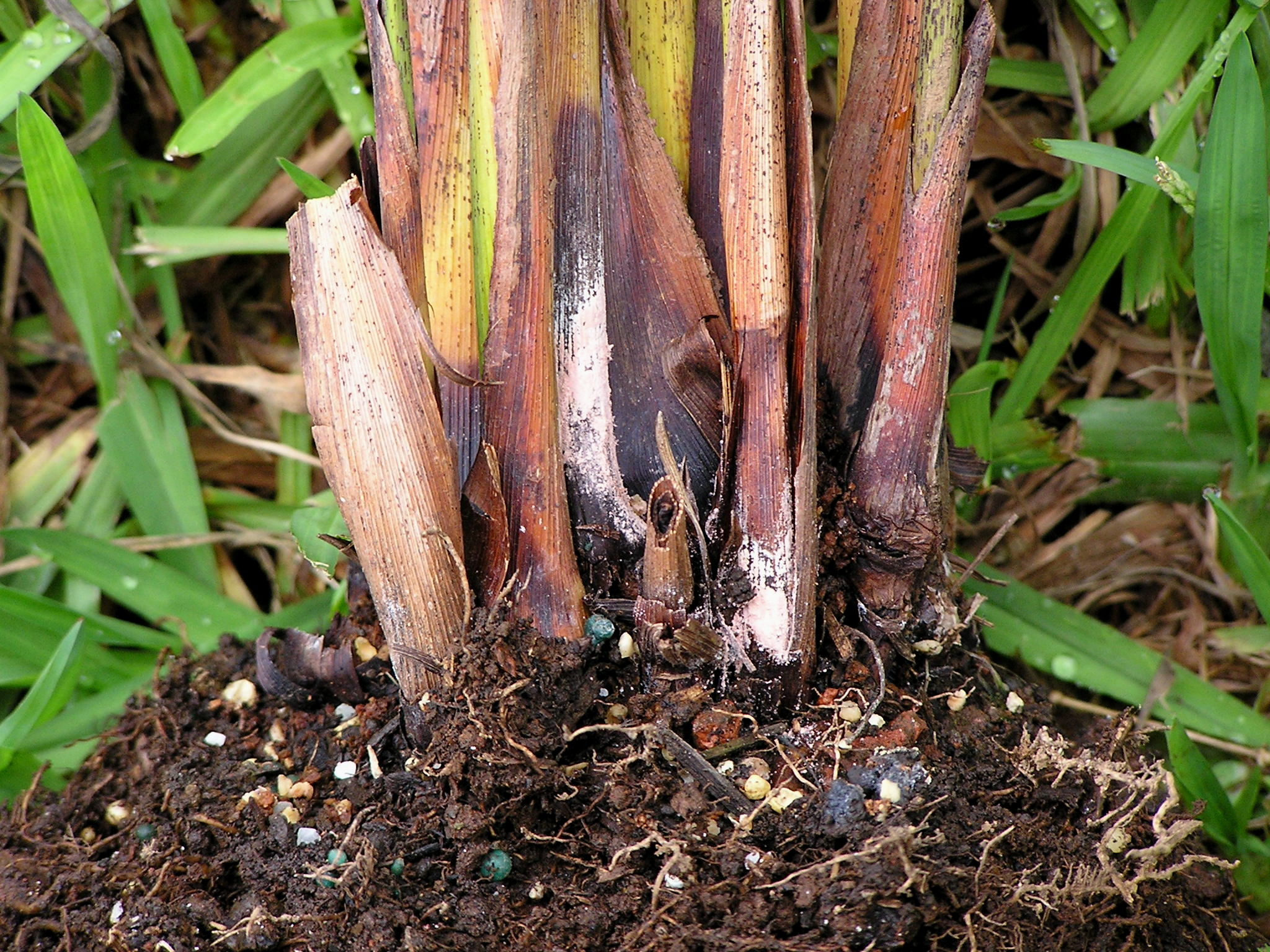
- Pink rot of areca palm (Chrysalidocarpus lutescens) caused by Gliocladium vermoeseni

Scientific classification
- Domain: Eukaryota
- Kingdom: Fungi
- Division: Ascomycota
- Class: Sordariomycetes
- Order: Hypocreales
- Family: Hypocreaceae
- Genus: Gliocladium; Corda, 1840

Species
- See text

= Gliocladium =

Genus of fungi

Gliocladium is an asexual fungal genus in the Hypocreaceae. Certain other species including Gliocladium virens were recently transferred to the genus Trichoderma and G. roseum became Clonostachys rosea f. rosea in the Bionectriaceae. Gliocladium is a mitosporic, filamentous fungus. Species of Gliocladium rarely produce a sexual state. Most pathogenic, disease-causing fungi in humans are mitosporic like Gliocladium. Gliocladium is filamentous; it grows tubular, elongated, and thread-like. It can be considered a contaminant.

== Species ==
Species fungorum currently (July 2018) lists the remaining species (+ G. zaleskii):

- Gliocladium africanum Eichelb. (1906)
- Gliocladium album (Preuss) Petch (1939)
- Gliocladium ammoniphilum Pidopl. & Bilaĭ (1950)
- Gliocladium atrum J.C. Gilman & E.V. Abbott (1927)
- Gliocladium borysseviczii Pidopl. (1950)
- Gliocladium caespitosum Petch (1939)
- Gliocladium cibotii J.F.H. Beyma (1944)
- Gliocladium cinereum Marchal & É.J. Marchal (1921)
- Gliocladium citrinum Bat., H. Maia & A.F. Vital (1957)
- Gliocladium comtus Rudakov (1981)
- Gliocladium cylindrosporum Matsush. (1975)
- Gliocladium elatum Sacc. (1909)
- Gliocladium flavofuscum J.H. Mill., Giddens & A.A. Foster (1958)
- Gliocladium flavum J.F.H. Beyma (1928)
- Gliocladium luteolum Höhn. (1903)
- Gliocladium microspermum (Sacc.) W. Gams (1982)
- Gliocladium microsporum Petch (1926)
- Gliocladium mumicola C.T. Wei (1941)
- Gliocladium nicotianae Oudem. (1903)
- Gliocladium novae-zelandiae Seifert, Samuels & W. Gams (1985)
- Gliocladium polyporicola (Henn.) Seifert & W. Gams (1985)
- Gliocladium salmonicolor Raillo (1929)
- Gliocladium sampajense Subram. & Bhat (1989)
- Gliocladium sphaerosporum Matsush. (1989)
- Gliocladium thaxteri Seifert & W. Gams (1985)
- Gliocladium verticillioides (G.A. Newton) Pidoplitschka (1930)
- Gliocladium vermoeseni (Biourge) Thom
- Gliocladium zaleskii Pidopl. (1953)

Note: the commonly-occurring (previously type) species "Gliocladium penicilloides" has now been placed in the genus Sphaerostilbella.

== Features ==
Species of Gliocladium are considered to have pathogenic potential although they are not commonly thought of as a disease causing agent in humans and animals. Gliotoxin is a metabolite of G. (now Trichoderma) deliquescens. The significance of gliotoxin has not yet been determined.

Gliocladium species occur worldwide in soil and decaying organic matter. Some species of Gliocladium are parasitic on other fungi. Gliocladium is found world-wide. Gliocladium is classified as a RG-1 organism; it is assessed to have low to no individual or community risk. Also, this microorganism is unlikely to cause human or animal disease. This status has been assessed by the American Biological Safety Association based upon criteria of the Classification of Infective Microorganisms by Risk Group.

Most species of Gliocladium grow rapidly in culture producing spreading colonies with a cotton-like texture, covering a Petri dish in 1 week. The colonies are initially white and cream-like; but may become reddish or green as they age and sporulate.

Microscopically, Gliocladium species produces hyphae, conidiophores, and conidia borne from hyaline phialides. The conidiophores are erect, dense, and have a brush-like structure which produce tapering, slimy phialides. Gliocladium can produce conidiophores that are branching and vertically oriented, similar to the genera Verticillium, Trichoderma and Penicillium. Conidia are single-celled and cylindrical, accumulating in slime droplets at the tips of phialides that often become confluent across the apex of the entire conidiophore. This characteristic is in contrast to the dry conidia borne in persistent chains that characterize members of the genus Penicillium
