= Capnodium salicinum =

Scientific classification
- Kingdom: Fungi
- Division: Ascomycota
- Class: Dothideomycetes
- Order: Capnodiales
- Family: Capnodiaceae
- Genus: Capnodium
- Species: C. salicinum

Binomial name
- Capnodium salicinum Mont.

Species of fungus

Capnodium salicinum is a sooty mold.
