= Cynthia Westcott =

Plant pathologist, author, and expert on roses

Dr. Cynthia Westcott
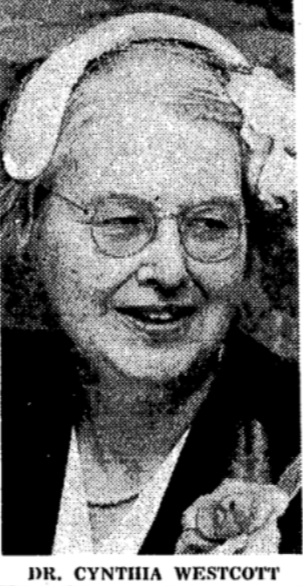

Personal details
- Born: 29 June 1898 North Attleboro, Massachusetts
- Died: 22 March 1983 (aged 84) North Tarrytown, New York
- Education: Wellesley College; Cornell University

Cynthia Westcott (June 29, 1898 – March 22, 1983) was an American plant pathologist, author, and expert on roses. She published a number of books and handbooks on horticulture and plant disease. Westcott was nicknamed "The Plant Doctor", and is credited with starting the "first ornamental disease diagnosis business" in the United States. Her work was featured in The New York Times, House and Garden, and The American Home. She identified the cause of the plant disease Ovulinia azaleae and a novel treatment for it.

Westcott was made a Fellow of the American Phytopathological Society in 1973. She was also a member of Sigma Delta Epsilon, the Entomological Society of America, the American Association for the Advancement of Science, and the American Horticultural Council which merged with the American Horticultural Society in 1960.

== Early life ==
Cynthia Westcott was born in North Attleboro, Massachusetts on June 29, 1898. She received her undergraduate degree from Wellesley College in 1920. She was able to get a full-time research assistantship at Cornell University from Herbert Hice Whetzel, head of the department of plant pathology. Although she was often assigned menial jobs as the only woman student, her work in the materials room gave her extensive experience in drying, pressing, and preserving specimens and preparing microscope slides for the classes in plant pathology. She also became aware of the importance of clean lab procedures. Westcott lived at the Sigma Delta Epsilon house for graduate women scientists, where she planted her first rose garden and test garden for the use of sprays. Westcott contributed significantly to research on the genus Sclerotinia, a group of fungi of great interest to mycologists and plant pathologists. She received her Ph.D. in plant pathology from Cornell in 1932, after completing a thesis on brand canker, caused in roses by Coniothyrium wernsdorffiae.

== Career ==
As a woman, Westcott faced limited employment options. She worked part-time as a bacteriologist at the New Jersey Experiment Station of Rutgers University and took classes at Rutgers. H. H. Whetzel suggested that she became a practical "plant doctor". In 1933, Westcott bought a garden which she described as "equipped with all the common plant diseases." She and entomologist Irene Dobroscky opened the "Plant Doctors" business at 96 Essex Avenue, Glen Ridge, New Jersey. Their first customer was Selman Waksman, Westcott's microbiology teacher at Rutgers.

Like a medical doctor, Westcott made house calls to her clients' gardens to diagnose and treat problems in roses and ornamentals. In the winters, she wrote, lectured, and traveled. Her first book, The Plant Doctor, was published in 1937. She taught classes and courses on gardening through Macy's, Bambergers, the Brooklyn Botanical Garden and the New York Botanical Garden. During World War II, she lectured on pest control for victory gardens.

In 1943, the U.S. Department of Agriculture asked Westcott to study a disease of azaleas called azalea flower spot that was disrupting the azalea market in the southern states. Congress had allocated a special appropriation for its study, but the USDA scientists became unavailable due to World War II. Westcott travelled to Mobile, Alabama and was able to culture and identify the cause of the disease, Ovulinia azaleae. She developed a chemical treatment in a new class of fungicides, disodium ethylene-bis-dithiocarbamate, and gave lectures to educate the public on its control. H. H. Whetzel wrote to her in congratulation:

"It is with a good deal of pride that I learned that one of my oId students and assistants has put it over the boys who have heretofore worked on azalea blight. The Cornell training does show up, doesn't it? Your personal experience as a practical plant pathologist has also greatly contributed to your success on this problem. It is not enough to solve a problem of this kind. You have the spirit and technique for getting your solution before the public; that is quite as important as the research work itself." H. H. Whetzel

Westcott published The Gardeners Bug Book in 1946, following it with the frequently reprinted Plant Disease Handbook in 1950. During her yearly Rose Day, she opened her test plots and gardens to the public and served punch and cookies for up to 700 visitors. Westcott was the subject of a biographical profile in The New Yorker in July 1952. As of 1968, she was the only self-employed phytopathologist in the country. The American Rose Society's National Convention with the Jackson and Perkins Company named a hybrid tea rose flower "Cynthia" in Westcott's honor in 1975.

== Awards and honors ==
- American Horticultural Council (1955)
- Gold Medal, Garden Club of New Jersey (1956)
- Gold Medal, American Rose Society (1960)
- Garden Writers Award, American Association of Nurserymen (1963)
- Garden Communicators International Hall of Fame (1982)

== Personal life ==
Cynthia Westcott died of a heart ailment on March 22, 1983 at Phelps Memorial Hospital in North Tarrytown, New York. The Cynthia Westcott Papers, an archive of Westcott's research notes and business correspondence, is located at Cornell University Library.

== Works ==
- Westcott, C. (1937). The Plant Doctor: The How, Why, and When of Disease and Insect Control in Your Garden. New York: Frederick A. Stokes.
- Westcott, C. (1946). The Gardener's Bug Book; 1,000 Insect Pests and Their Control. New York: American Garden Guild and Doubleday.
- Westcott, C. (1950). Plant Disease Handbook. New York: Van Nostrand.
- Westcott, C. (1952). Anyone Can Grow Roses. Toronto: Van Nostrand.
- Westcott, C. (1953). Garden Enemies. Princeton, NJ: D. Van Nostrand.
- Westcott, C. (1957). Plant Doctoring is Fun. Princeton, NJ: Van Nostrand.
- Westcott, C. (1961). Are You Your Garden's Worst Pest? Garden City, NY: Doubleday.
- Westcott, C. and Jerry T. Walker, eds. (1966). Handbook on Garden Pests. Brooklyn, NY: Brooklyn Botanic Garden.
- Westcott, C. and Peter K. Nelson, eds. (1980). Handbook on Biological Control of Plant Pests. Special issue of Plants & Gardens, Vol. 16, No. 3. Brooklyn, NY: Brooklyn Botanic Garden.
