= Capnodium ramosum =

Scientific classification
- Domain: Eukaryota
- Kingdom: Fungi
- Division: Ascomycota
- Class: Dothideomycetes
- Order: Capnodiales
- Family: Capnodiaceae
- Genus: Capnodium
- Species: C. ramosum

Binomial name
- Capnodium ramosum Cooke

Species of fungus

Capnodium ramosum is sooty mold widespread in India that affects mangos. Honeydew secreted by aphids and other insects attracts the mold, making it quickly spread.
