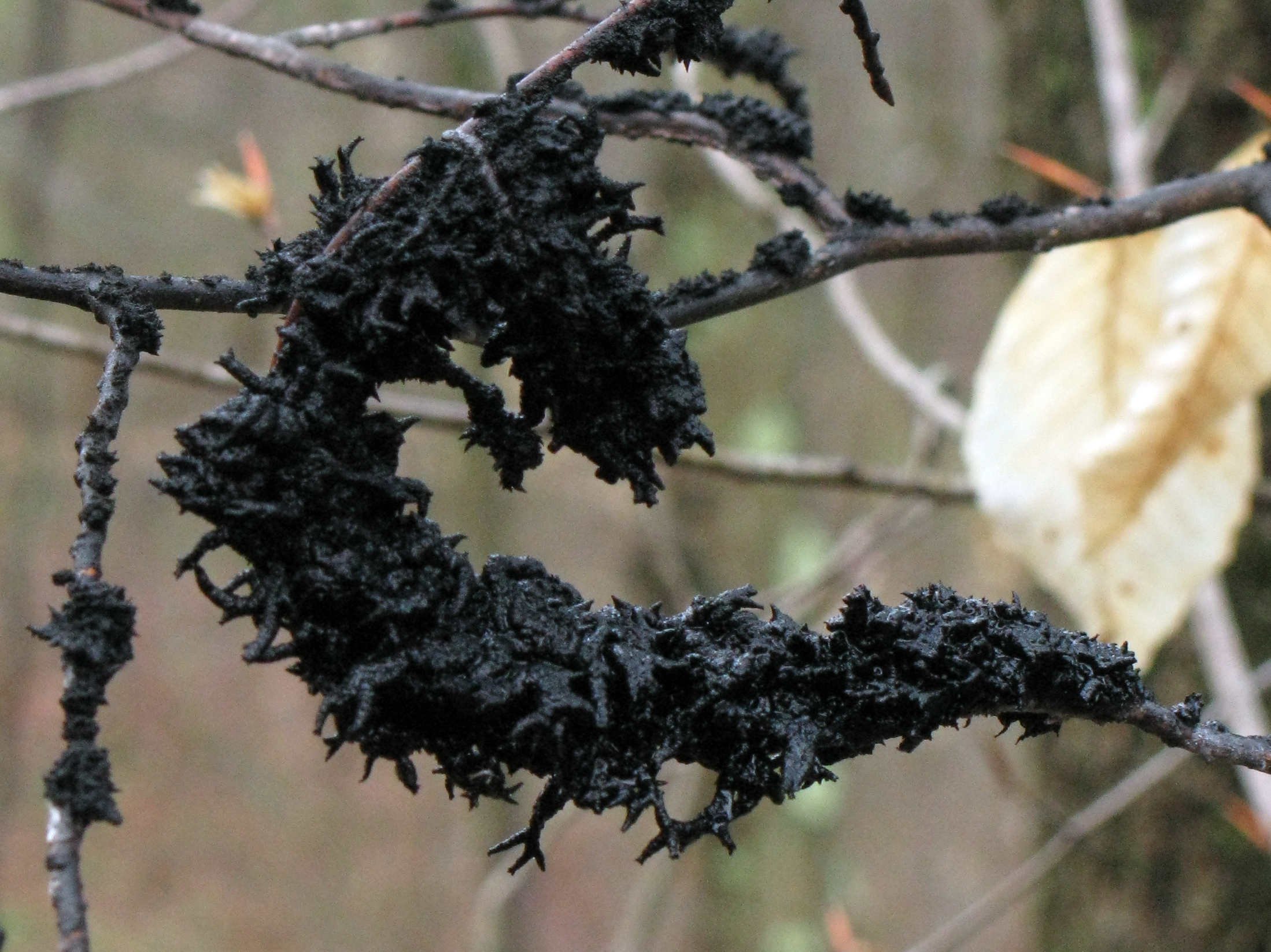

Scientific classification
- Kingdom: Fungi
- Division: Ascomycota
- Class: Dothideomycetes
- Order: Capnodiales
- Family: Capnodiaceae
- Genus: Scorias
- Species: S. spongiosa

Binomial name
- Scorias spongiosa Schweinitz, 1822

= Scorias spongiosa =

Species of fungus

Scorias spongiosa is a sooty mold fungus that grows on aphid honeydew. It is a member of the Capnodiaceae family of ascomycete fungi. It is found only on American beech trees, Fagus grandifolia.

== Overview ==
Scorias spongiosa is a specialist and grows exclusively on the honeydew formed by colonies of the beech blight aphid, Grylloprociphilus imbricator. This aphid is found only on one host plant, the American beech tree, Fagus grandifolia, where it congregates on branches and twigs, creating copious amounts of honeydew that drip onto vegetation below. The large quantity of honeydew enables this fungus to grow to a large size, much bigger than other sooty mould fungi, which produce only a thin black layer on the surface of leaves. On tree trunks this fungus has been known to grow into a mass of hyphae as big as a football, but it is more usual for the agglomeration on branches or twigs to reach a diameter of about fifteen centimetres.

== Life cycle ==
The aphids accumulate in late summer and autumn, forming large colonies. Spores of Scorias spongiosa are borne by wind and rain and fall on the honeydew secretions found below the aphids. The first hyphal growth is straw coloured and unpigmented. The hyphae adhere to each other for short distances, diverging and re-adhering to form a loose stranded structure. Pigmentation begins to occur on the surfaces of outer strands and the stroma begins to darken. The hyphae coalesce and form mycelial strands which radiate outward and upward from the supporting structure. Flask-shaped, spore-bearing pycnidia appear on the mycelia, which have a waxlike appearance: the matrix turns from brittle to soft as it absorbs moisture. As further quantities of honeydew accumulate, the fungus grows larger until it resembles a gelatinous sponge resting on the branches or leaves of the beech tree. Fully pigmented strands in the mature stoma produce bowl-shaped pseudothecia and these outermost hyphae cease to grow. The inner strands continue growth and force their way to the exterior. Asexual conidia are extruded in a slimy matrix in liquid droplets from the pycnidia. As time passes the stroma becomes a spongy black mass and produces sexual spores called ascospores in the pseudothecia, which remain embedded in the stroma.

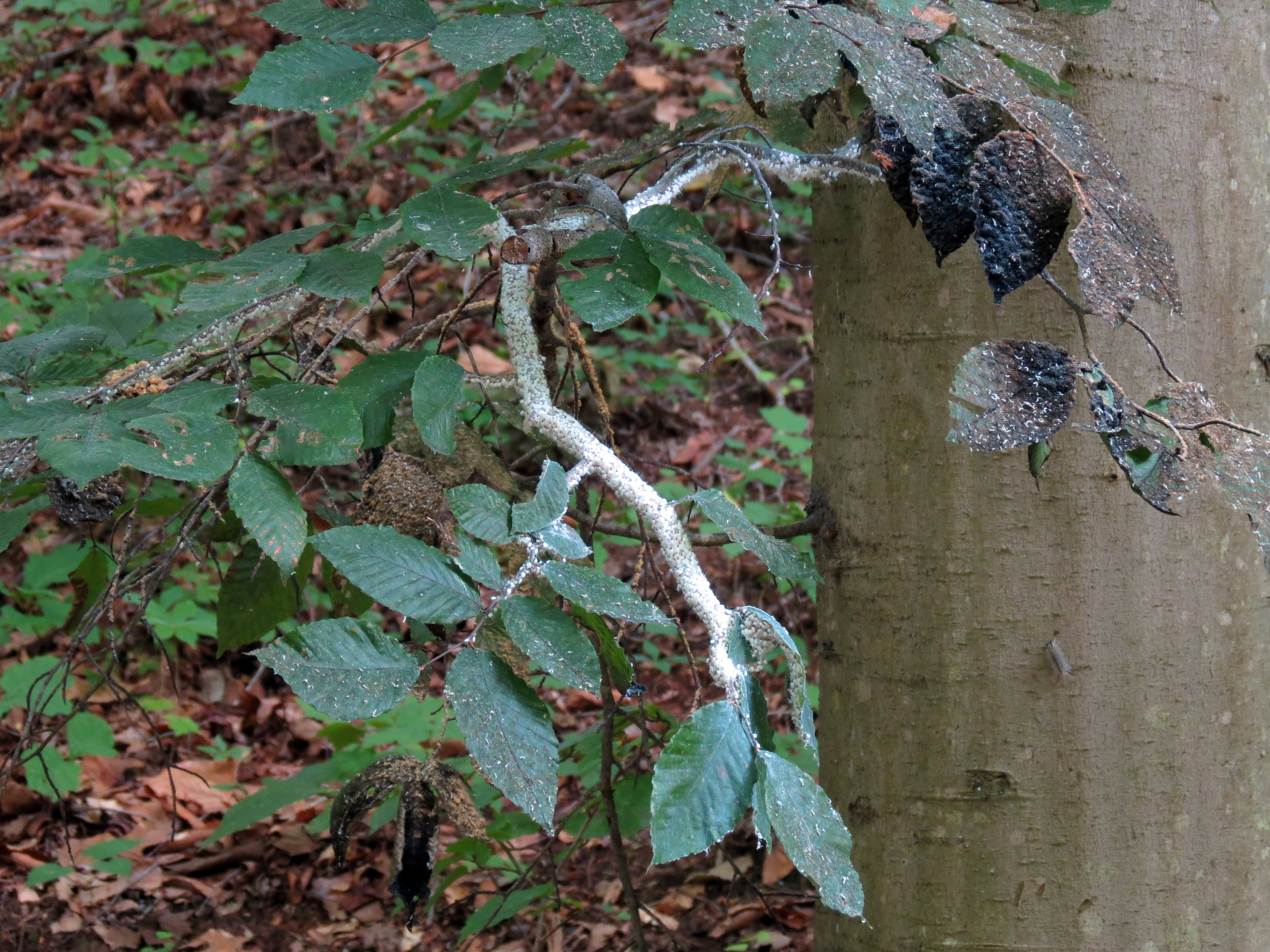
Beech branch covered in beech blight aphids and S. spongiosa

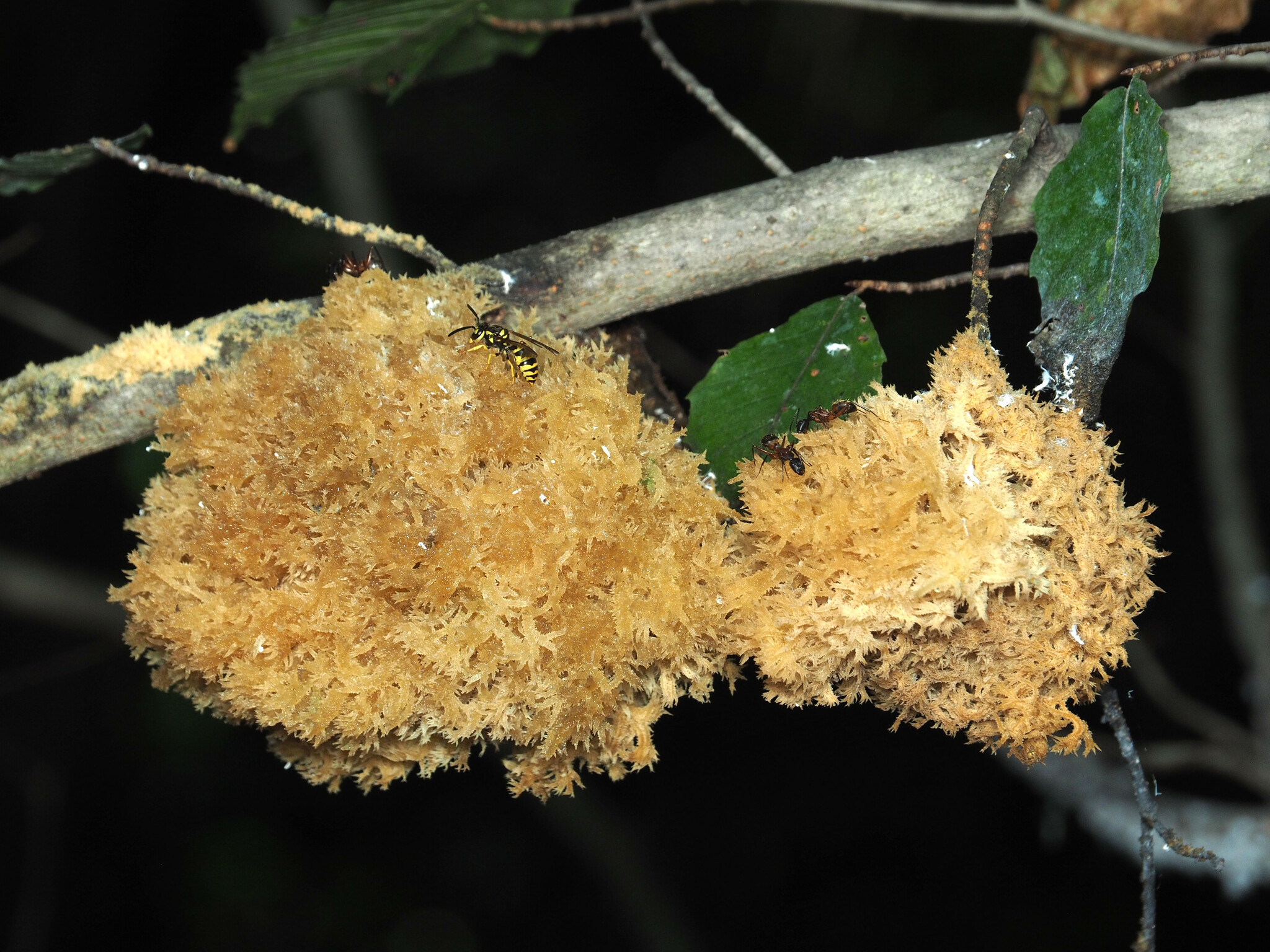
Young, unpigmented S. spongiosa specimen growing on a beech branch

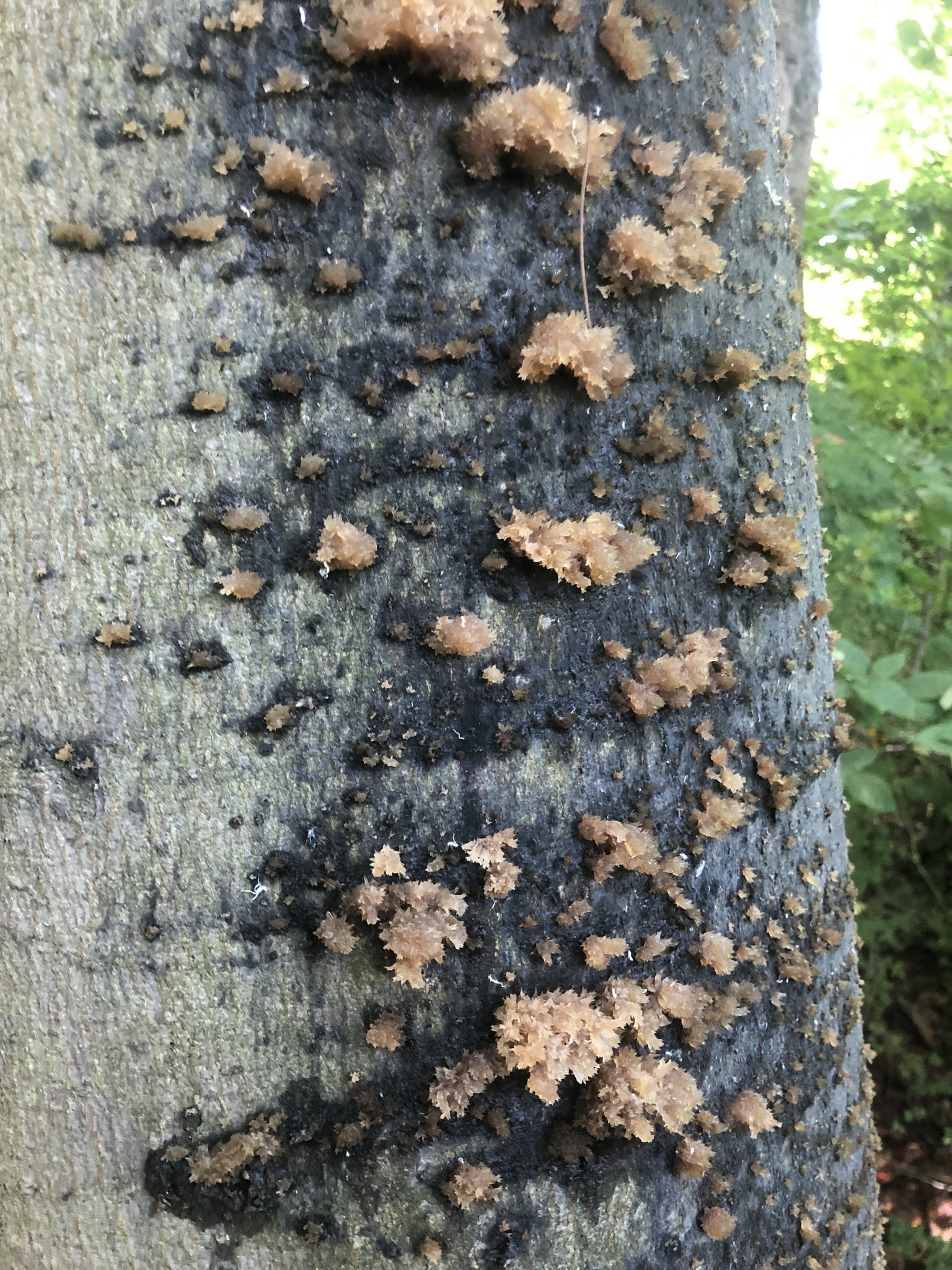
Patches of S. spongiosa growing on a beech trunk

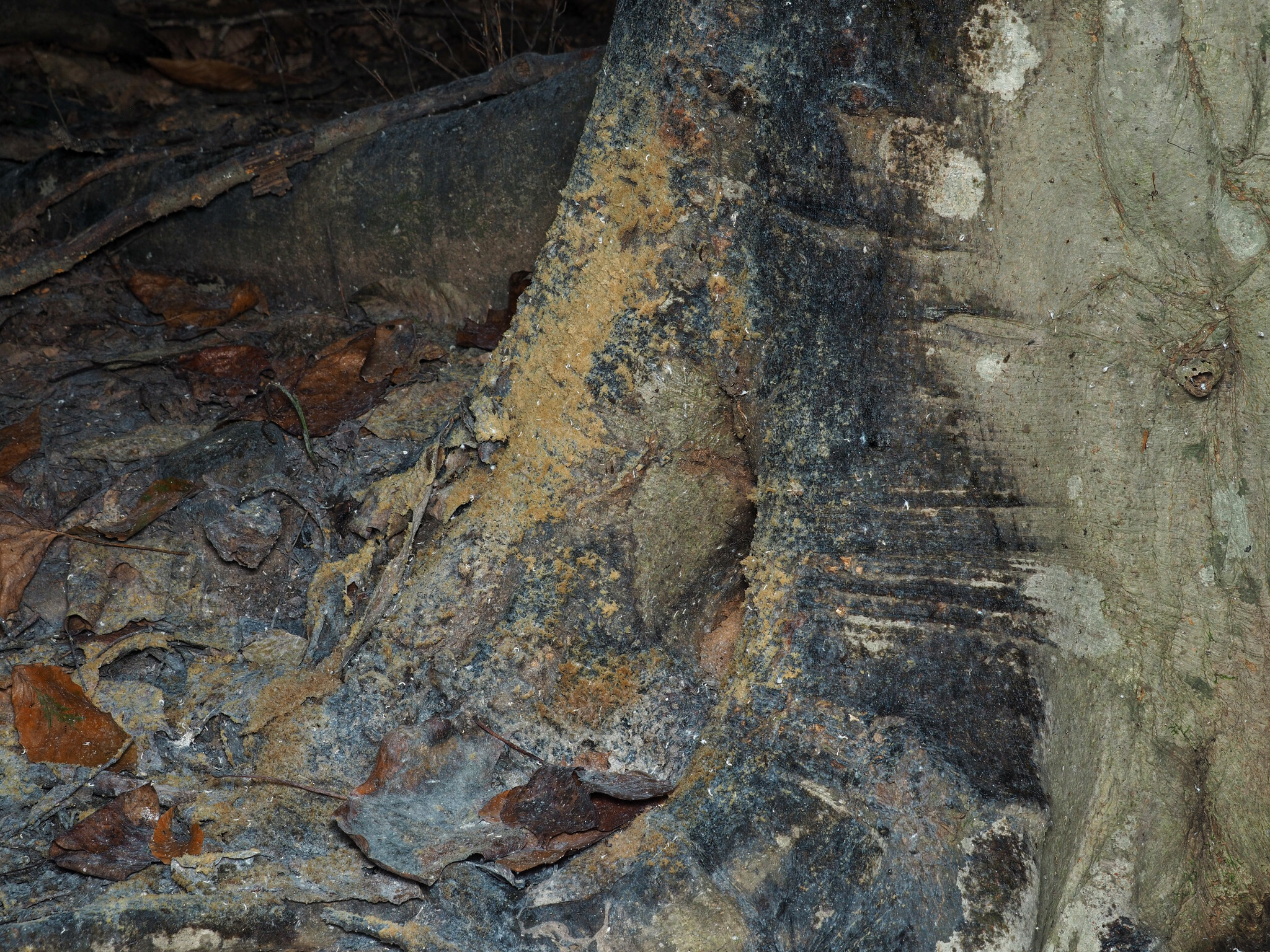
S. spongiosa growing on the base of a beech tree covered in honey dew

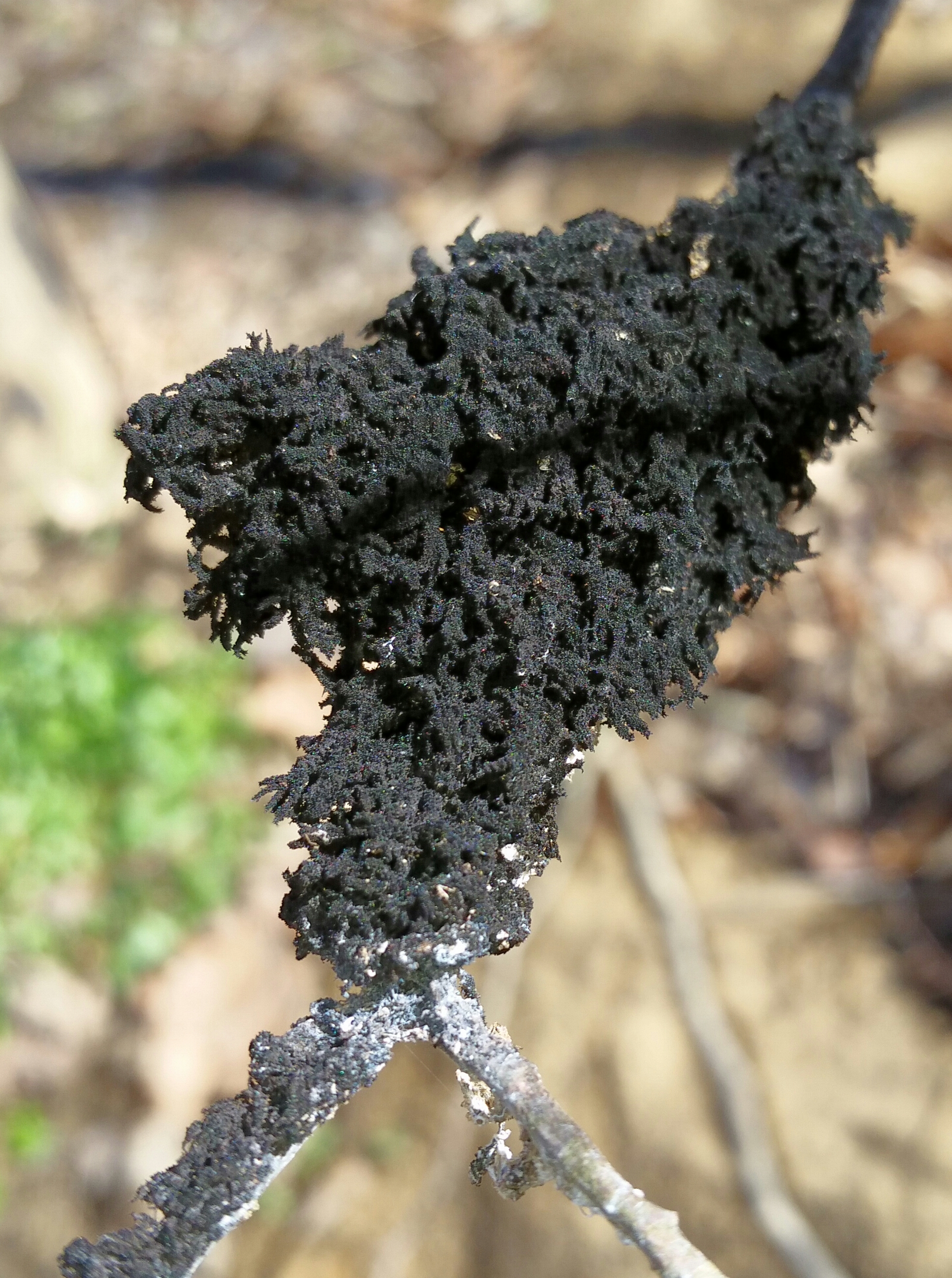
Mature S. spongiosa stroma

== Similar species ==
Apiosporina morbosa appears on cherry and plum trees and their relatives.
