= Pink rot =

Pink rot is a fungal disease of various plants, caused by various organisms:

- Phytophthora erythroseptica – pink rot of potatoes and carrots (tubers)
- Trichothecium roseum – pink rot of apples, grapes, avocados, peaches and nectarines (fruit)
- Nalanthamala vermoeseni or Gliocladium vermoeseni – pink rot of date palm (inflorescence)
