= P. terrestris =

P. terrestris may refer to:

- Pedilochilus terrestris, an orchid species in the genus Pedilochilus
- Phaeotrichoconis terrestris, a plant pathogen species
- Phyllastrephus terrestris, a songbird species
- Phytophthora terrestris, a water mould species
- Pseudotetracystis terrestris, an alga species in the genus Pseudotetracystis
- Pyrenochaeta terrestris, a fungal plant pathogen species

== See also ==
- Terrestris
