= Hyaloscolecostroma =

Scientific classification
- Kingdom: Fungi
- Division: Ascomycota
- Class: Dothideomycetes
- Order: Capnodiales
- Family: Capnodiaceae
- Genus: Hyaloscolecostroma; Bat. & J. Oliveira

Type species
- Hyaloscolecostroma rondoniense Bat. & J. Oliveira

Genus of fungi

Hyaloscolecostroma is a genus of fungi within the Capnodiaceae family. This is a monotypic genus, containing the single species Hyaloscolecostroma rondoniense.
