= Polychaeton =

Scientific classification
- Kingdom: Fungi
- Division: Ascomycota
- Class: Dothideomycetes
- Order: Capnodiales
- Family: Capnodiaceae
- Genus: Polychaeton (Pers.) Lév.

Genus of fungi

Polychaeton is a genus of fungi within the Capnodiaceae family.

== Species ==
- P. artocarpi
- P. avellanae
- P. axillatum
- P. bassiae
- P. bougainvilleae
- P. citri
- P. ichnocarpicola
- P. mangiferae
- P. pannosum
- P. purpuraefaciens
- P. quercinum
- P. tabebuiae
