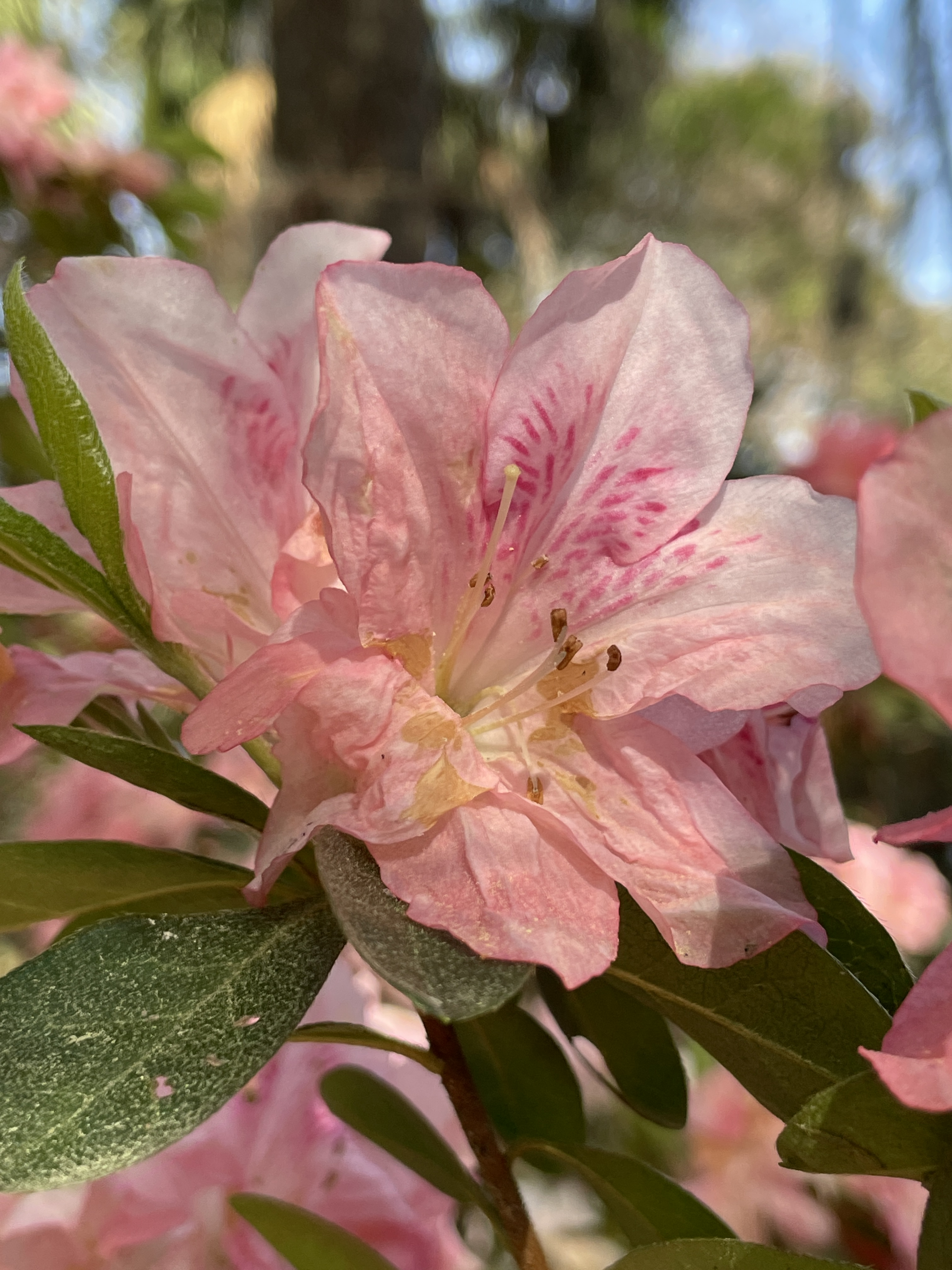
- Ovulinia petal blight caused by Ovulinia azaleae

Scientific classification
- Kingdom: Fungi
- Division: Ascomycota
- Class: Leotiomycetes
- Order: Helotiales
- Family: Sclerotiniaceae
- Genus: Ovulinia; F.A. Weiss

Type species
- Ovulinia azaleae F.A. Weiss

= Ovulinia =

Genus of fungi

Ovulinia is a genus of fungi in the family Sclerotiniaceae.
