= Capnodium theae =

Scientific classification
- Kingdom: Fungi
- Division: Ascomycota
- Class: Dothideomycetes
- Order: Capnodiales
- Family: Capnodiaceae
- Genus: Capnodium
- Species: C. theae

Binomial name
- Capnodium theae Boedijn, (1931)

Species of fungus

Capnodium theae is a plant pathogen that affects the leaves of the tea plant.
