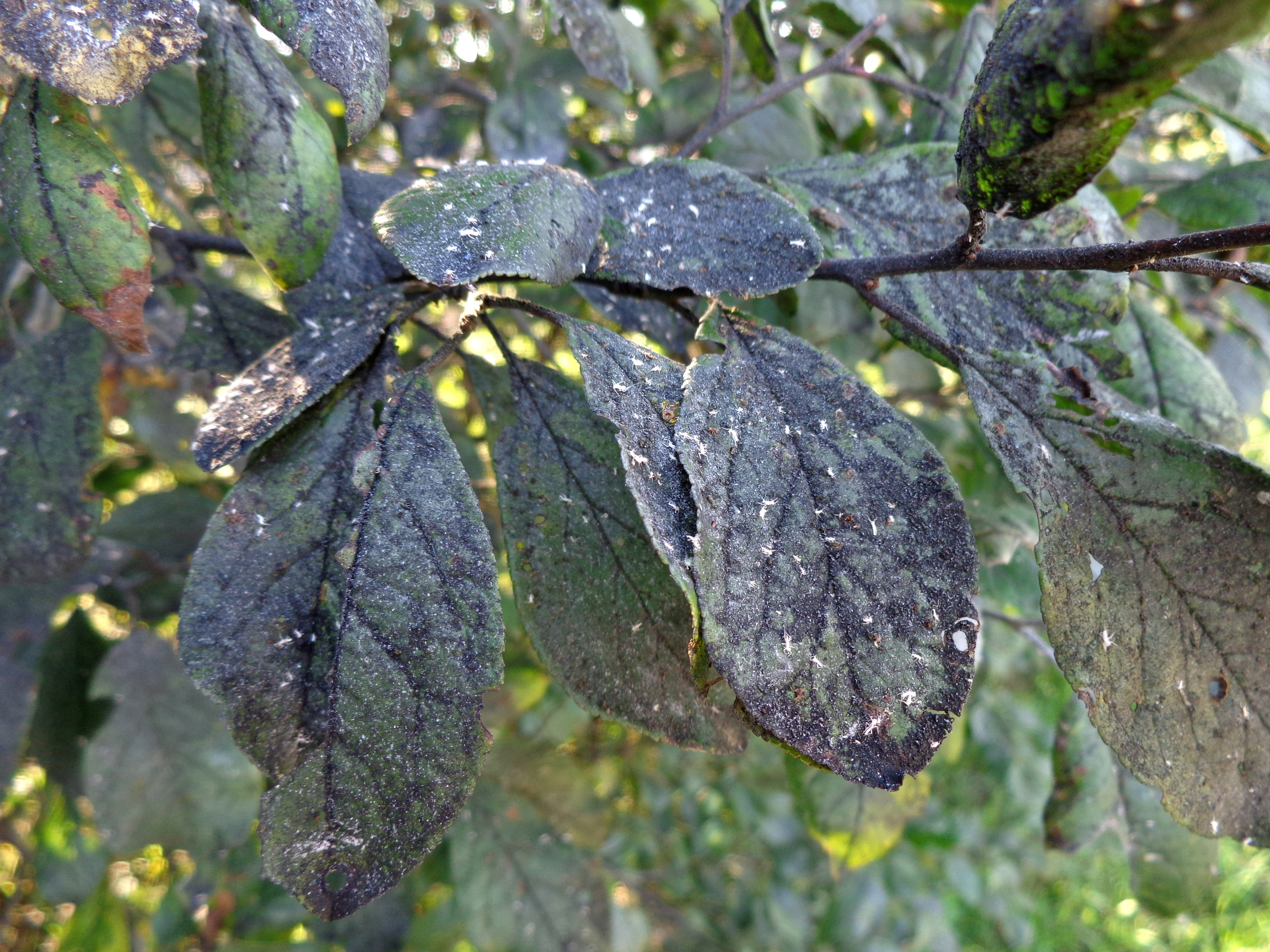

Scientific classification
- Domain: Eukaryota
- Kingdom: Fungi
- Division: Ascomycota
- Class: Dothideomycetes
- Order: Capnodiales
- Family: Capnodiaceae
- Genus: Capnodium; Mont. (1849)

Type species
- Capnodium salicinum Mont. (1849)

Species
- See text

Synonyms
- Apiosporium Kunze (1817); Fumago sect. Polychaeton Pers. (1822); Polychaeton (Pers.) Lév. (1846); Morfea Roze (1867); Morfea (G.Arnaud) Cif. & Bat. (1963)

= Capnodium =

Genus of fungi

Capnodium is a genus of sooty molds in the family Capnodiaceae. It was circumscribed in 1849 by French mycologist Camille Montagne with Capnodium salicinum as the type species.

== Species list ==
- C. acakantherae
- C. annonae
- C. araucariae
- C. armeniacae
- C. arrhizum
- C. australe
- C. axillatum
- C. baccharidis
- C. batistae
- C. berberidis
- C. betle
- C. brasiliense
- C. caespitosum
- C. callitris
- C. capsuliferum
- C. carissae
- C. caroliniense
- C. cassiae
- C. casuarinae
- C. cesatii
- C. chaetomorphum
- C. cistophilum
- C. citri
- C. citricola
- C. clavatum
- C. coffeae
- C. corni
- C. crouanii
- C. cryptolepidis
- C. dematum
- C. doratopsis
- C. elaeophilum
- C. ellisii
- C. elongatum
- C. erythrinicola
- C. eugeniarum
- C. expansum
- C. fibrosum
- C. foedum
- C. footii
- C. fruticola
- C. fuliginodes
- C. fuligo
- C. grandisporum
- C. guajavae
- C. guaraniticum
- C. heteromeles
- C. hirtum
- C. ilicinum
- C. indicum
- C. jasmini
- C. juniperinum
- C. kamatii
- C. lanosum
- C. lentisci
- C. lonicerae
- C. loranthi
- C. lygodesmiae
- C. mangiferae
- C. maximum
- C. melioloides
- C. mesnierianum
- C. minimum
- C. mori
- C. mucronatum
- C. musae
- C. nerii
- C. nudicum
- C. paraguayense
- C. pelliculosum
- C. persicae
- C. persoonii
- C. phyllanthi
- C. pini
- C. pomorum
- C. puccinoides
- C. ramosum
- C. rhamni
- C. rhamnicola
- C. richardii
- C. schweinitzii
- C. scoriadeum
- C. sphaeroideum
- C. spongiosum
- C. stellatum
- C. stysanophorum
- C. tanakae
- C. taxi
- C. theae
- C. thuemenii
- C. thwaitesii
- C. tiliae
- C. trichostomum
- C. tropicum
- C. tuba
- C. uniseptatum
- C. usteri
- C. walteri
