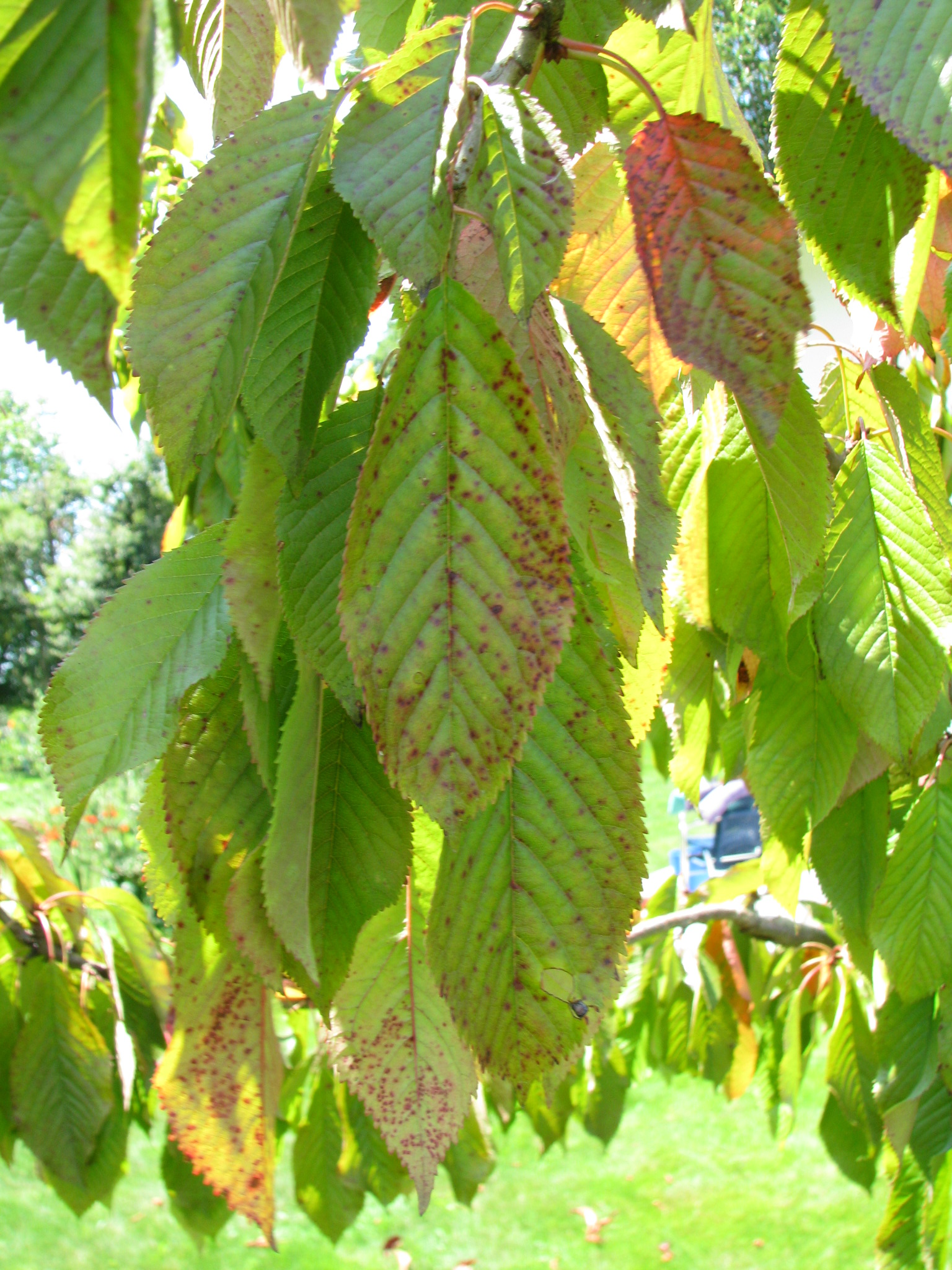
- Sick Prunus cerasus

Scientific classification
- Kingdom: Fungi
- Division: Ascomycota
- Class: Sordariomycetes
- Order: Diaporthales
- Family: Melanconidaceae
- Genus: Coryneum; Nees 1816

Species
- See text

= Coryneum =

Genus of fungi

Coryneum is a genus of phytopathogenic fungi having more than 100 species, of which some cause tree cankers.

== Species ==
- Coryneum acaciae
- Coryneum aesculinum
- Coryneum affine
- Coryneum ambiguum
- Coryneum anhaltinum
- Coryneum arbuticola
- Coryneum artemisiae
- Coryneum berkeleyi
- Coryneum betulinum
- Coryneum bicorne
- Coryneum biseptatum
- Coryneum calophylli
- Coryneum calosporum
- Coryneum camelliae
- Coryneum camerunense
- Coryneum canadense
- Coryneum carbonaceum
- Coryneum carpinicola
- Coryneum castaneae
- Coryneum castaneicola
- Coryneum cesatii
- Coryneum clusiae
- Coryneum cocois
- Coryneum comari
- Coryneum compactum
- Coryneum concolor
- Coryneum confluens
- Coryneum confusum
- Coryneum corni-asperifoliae
- Coryneum crataegicola
- Coryneum cupulatum
- Coryneum cydoniae
- Coryneum decipiens
- Coryneum disciforme
- Coryneum discolor
- Coryneum dubium
- Coryneum effusum
- Coryneum eleagni
- Coryneum elevatum
- Coryneum ellipticum
- Coryneum ephedrae
- Coryneum epilobii
- Coryneum epiphyllum
- Coryneum eriobotryae
- Coryneum eucalypti
- Coryneum eurotiae
- Coryneum eximium
- Coryneum fagineum
- Coryneum feijoae
- Coryneum foliicola
- Coryneum foliorum
- Coryneum fusarioides
- Coryneum glochidiicola
- Coryneum gregoryi
- Coryneum gummiparum
- Coryneum heterosporum
- Coryneum impressum
- Coryneum indicum
- Coryneum insuetum
- Coryneum irregulare
- Coryneum japonicum
- Coryneum juniperi
- Coryneum kunzei
- Coryneum longistipitatum
- Coryneum lycii
- Coryneum macrosporum
- Coryneum maculicola
- Coryneum marginatum
- Coryneum megaspermum
- Coryneum menioci
- Coryneum microstictoides
- Coryneum microstictum
- Coryneum modonium
- Coryneum mucronatum
- Coryneum myristicae
- Coryneum naucosum
- Coryneum neesii
- Coryneum negundinis
- Coryneum nigrellum
- Coryneum notarisianum
- Coryneum obscurum
- Coryneum opacum
- Coryneum papilliferum
- Coryneum paraphysatum
- Coryneum pedunculatum
- Coryneum perniciosum
- Coryneum pinicola
- Coryneum pirinum
- Coryneum populi
- Coryneum populicola
- Coryneum prunorum
- Coryneum psidii
- Coryneum pulchrum
- Coryneum pustulatum
- Coryneum pyricola
- Coryneum pyrinum
- Coryneum quercinum
- Coryneum rhododendri
- Coryneum rhoinum
- Coryneum rhois
- Coryneum ribicola
- Coryneum romanum
- Coryneum rosae
- Coryneum rosicola
- Coryneum rostratum
- Coryneum rubi
- Coryneum ruborum
