= Callebaea =

Scientific classification
- Kingdom: Fungi
- Division: Ascomycota
- Class: Dothideomycetes
- Order: Capnodiales
- Family: Capnodiaceae
- Genus: Callebaea (Hansf.) Bat.

Type species
- Callebaea rutideae (Hansf.) Bat.

Genus of fungi

Callebaea is a genus of fungi within the Capnodiaceae family. This is a monotypic genus, containing the single species Callebaea rutideae.
