= Capnophaeum =

Scientific classification
- Kingdom: Fungi
- Division: Ascomycota
- Class: Dothideomycetes
- Order: Capnodiales
- Family: Capnodiaceae
- Genus: Capnophaeum; Speg.

Type species
- Capnophaeum indicum C. Bernard

Genus of fungi

Capnophaeum is a genus of fungi within the Capnodiaceae family.

== Species ==
- C. citri
- C. citricola
- C. fuliginoides
- C. indicum
- C. ischurochloae
- C. laricis
- C. spongiosum
- C. vermisporum
