= Ovulitis azaleae =

Scientific classification
- Kingdom: Fungi
- Division: Ascomycota
- Class: Leotiomycetes
- Order: Helotiales
- Family: Sclerotiniaceae
- Genus: Ovulitis
- Species: O. azaleae

Binomial name
- Ovulitis azaleae N.F. Buchw. (1970)

Species of fungus

Ovulitis azaleae is a plant pathogen affecting azaleas and rhododendrons.

== See also ==
- List of azalea diseases
- List of rhododendron diseases
