= Aithaloderma =

Scientific classification
- Kingdom: Fungi
- Division: Ascomycota
- Class: Dothideomycetes
- Order: Capnodiales
- Family: Capnodiaceae
- Genus: Aithaloderma; Syd. & P. Syd.

Type species
- Scoriadopsis miconiae J.M. Mend.

Genus of fungi

Aithaloderma is a genus of fungi within the Capnodiaceae family.

== Species ==
- Aithaloderma bambusinum
- Aithaloderma camelliae
- Aithaloderma capense
- Aithaloderma clavatisporum
- Aithaloderma colchicum
- Aithaloderma ferrugineum
- Aithaloderma fici
- Aithaloderma himalayanum
- Aithaloderma japonica
- Aithaloderma longisetum
- Aithaloderma phyllostachydis, Hara, 1931
- Aithaloderma setosum
- Aithaloderma taxi
- Aithaloderma viride
