= Phragmocapnias =

Scientific classification
- Kingdom: Fungi
- Division: Ascomycota
- Class: Dothideomycetes
- Order: Capnodiales
- Family: Capnodiaceae
- Genus: Phragmocapnias; Theiss. & Syd. (1918)

Type species
- Phragmocapnias betle (Syd., P.Syd. & E.J.Butler) Theiss. & Syd. (1918)

Synonyms
- Antennellopsis J.M.Mend. (1930); Capnobatista Cif. & F.B.Leal ex Bat. & Cif. (1963); Chaetoscorias W.Yamam. (1955); Conidiocarpus Woron. (1917); Conidioxyphium Bat. & Cif. (1963); Neocapnodium W.Yamam. (1955); Paropodia Cif. & Bat. (1956); Podoxyphium Speg. (1918); Triposporiopsis W.Yamam. (1955)

Genus of fungi

Phragmocapnias is a genus of fungi in the family Capnodiaceae.

== Species ==
- Phragmocapnias asiaticus Chomnunti & K.D.Hyde (2011)
- Phragmocapnias betle (Syd., P.Syd. & E.J.Butler) Theiss. & Syd. (1918)
- Phragmocapnias callitris (McAlpine) Cif. & Bat. (1963)
- Phragmocapnias heliconiae Cif. & Bat. (1963)
- Phragmocapnias imperspicua (Sacc.) Cif. & Bat. (1963)
- Phragmocapnias longicolla (Matsush.) Chomnunti & K.D.Hyde (2011)
- Phragmocapnias penzigii (Woron.) Chomnunti & K.D.Hyde (2011)
- Phragmocapnias plumeriae (Hongsanan & K.D.Hyde) Abdollahz. & Crous (2020)
- Phragmocapnias siamensis Chomnunti & K.D.Hyde (2011)
