= Anopeltis =

Scientific classification
- Kingdom: Fungi
- Division: Ascomycota
- Class: Dothideomycetes
- Order: Capnodiales
- Family: Capnodiaceae
- Genus: Anopeltis; Bat. & Peres

Type species
- Anopeltis venezuelensis Bat. & Peres

Genus of fungi

Anopeltis is a genus of fungi within the Capnodiaceae family. This is a monotypic genus, containing the single species Anopeltis venezuelensis.
