= Echinothecium =

Scientific classification
- Kingdom: Fungi
- Division: Ascomycota
- Class: Dothideomycetes
- Order: Capnodiales
- Family: Capnodiaceae
- Genus: Echinothecium; Zopf (1898)

Type species
- Echinothecium reticulatum Zopf (1898)

Species
- E. aerophilum E. cladoniae E. reticulatum

Genus of fungi

Echinothecium is a genus of fungi in the family Capnodiaceae.
