= Ceramoclasteropsis =

Scientific classification
- Kingdom: Fungi
- Division: Ascomycota
- Class: Dothideomycetes
- Order: Capnodiales
- Family: Capnodiaceae
- Genus: Ceramoclasteropsis; Bat. & Cavalc.

Type species
- Ceramoclasteropsis coumae Bat. & Cavalc.

Species
- C. coumae C. piperis C. pipernigricola

Genus of fungi

Ceramoclasteropsis is a genus of fungi within the Capnodiaceae family.
