= Scoriadopsis =

Scientific classification
- Kingdom: Fungi
- Division: Ascomycota
- Class: Dothideomycetes
- Order: Capnodiales
- Family: Capnodiaceae
- Genus: Scoriadopsis; J.M. Mend.

Type species
- Scoriadopsis miconiae J.M. Mend.

Genus of fungi

Scoriadopsis is a genus of fungi within the Capnodiaceae family. This is a monotypic genus, containing the single species Scoriadopsis miconiae.
