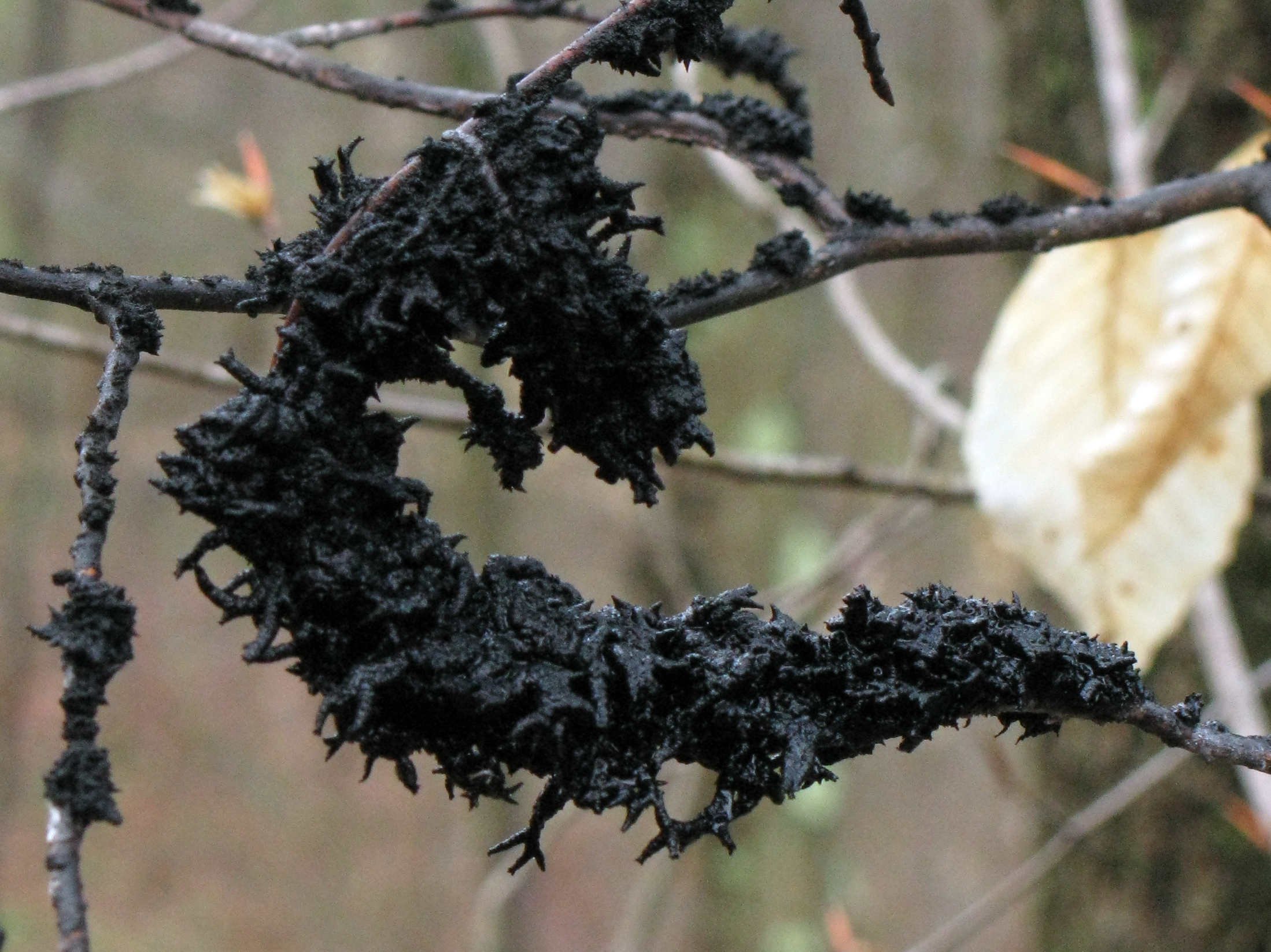
- Scorias spongiosa

Scientific classification
- Kingdom: Fungi
- Division: Ascomycota
- Class: Dothideomycetes
- Order: Capnodiales
- Family: Capnodiaceae
- Genus: Scorias; Fr.

Type species
- Scorias spongiosa (Schwein.) Fr.

Species
- S. brasiliensis S. capitata S. citrina S. communis S. cylindrica S. paulensis S. philippinensis S. spongiosa S. tanakae

Synonyms
- Antennella Theiss. & Syd. Antennellina J.M. Mend. Hyalocapnias Bat. & Cif. Limacinia subgen. Leptocapnodium G. Arnaud; Leptocapnodium (G. Arnaud) Cif. & Bat. Paracapnodium Speg. Xystozukalia Theiss.

= Scorias =

Genus of fungi

Scorias is a genus of fungi within the Capnodiaceae family. The genus was first described by Elias Magnus Fries in 1832. The fungus is known as sooty mould and is found growing on honeydew on leaves of many varieties of trees and plants.

== Characteristics ==
The mycelium of these fungi have parallel walls and form a thick spongy mass. The perithecium is round and long stalked and the spores have four cells.

== Effects of sooty mould ==
Sooty moulds grow in thin black layers on leaves on which aphids, witefly or other sap-sucking insects have deposited their honeydew. It does not grow parasitically but it harms plants indirectly and is also unsightly. The mould coats the leaves and this blocks out light and makes photosynthesis less effective. Plant growth can be reduced, leaves covered in mould may die prematurely and there may be a reduction in fruit yield.
