= Microsphaera vaccinii =

Scientific classification
- Kingdom: Fungi
- Division: Ascomycota
- Class: Leotiomycetes
- Order: Helotiales
- Family: Erysiphaceae
- Genus: Microsphaera
- Species: M. vaccinii

Binomial name
- Microsphaera vaccinii (Schwein.) Cooke & Peck

Synonyms
- Microsphaera penicillata var. vaccinii (Schwein.) W.B. Cooke

Species of fungus

Microsphaera vaccinii is a fungal plant pathogen that causes powdery mildew.
