= Calonectria indusiata =

Scientific classification
- Kingdom: Fungi
- Division: Ascomycota
- Class: Sordariomycetes
- Order: Hypocreales
- Family: Nectriaceae
- Genus: Calonectria
- Species: C. indusiata

Binomial name
- Calonectria indusiata (Seaver) Crous 2002

Synonyms
- Calonectria theae Loos 1950; Candelospora theae (Petch) Wakef. ex Gadd, (1949); Cercosporella theae Petch, (1917); Cylindrocladium theae (Petch) Subram., (1972); Nectria indusiata Seaver 1928

Species of fungus

Calonectria indusiata is a fungal plant pathogen with several hosts.

== Infected plants ==
See:

- List of azalea diseases
- List of foliage plant diseases (Arecaceae)
- List of rhododendron diseases
- List of tea diseases
