= Corticium theae =

Scientific classification
- Domain: Eukaryota
- Kingdom: Fungi
- Division: Basidiomycota
- Class: Agaricomycetes
- Order: Corticiales
- Family: Corticiaceae
- Genus: Corticium
- Species: C. theae

Binomial name
- Corticium theae (C. Bernard) C. Bernard, (1908)

Species of fungus

Corticium theae is fungus that is a plant pathogen.
