= Coryneum rhododendri =

Scientific classification
- Kingdom: Fungi
- Division: Ascomycota
- Class: Sordariomycetes
- Order: Diaporthales
- Family: Melanconidaceae
- Genus: Coryneum
- Species: C. rhododendri

Binomial name
- Coryneum rhododendri Schwein., (1832)

Species of fungus

Coryneum rhododendri is a plant pathogen.
