= Cochliobolus setariae =

Scientific classification
- Domain: Eukaryota
- Kingdom: Fungi
- Division: Ascomycota
- Class: Dothideomycetes
- Order: Pleosporales
- Family: Pleosporaceae
- Genus: Cochliobolus
- Species: C. setariae

Binomial name
- Cochliobolus setariae (S. Ito & Kurib.) Drechsler ex Dastur, (1942)

Synonyms
- Bipolaris setariae (Sawada) Shoemaker, (1959); Drechslera setariae (Sawada) Subram. & B.L. Jain, (1966); Helminthosporium setariae Sawada, (1919); Helminthosporium setariae Lind; Ophiobolus setariae S. Ito & Kurib., (1930)

Species of fungus

Cochliobolus setariae is a fungal plant pathogen.
