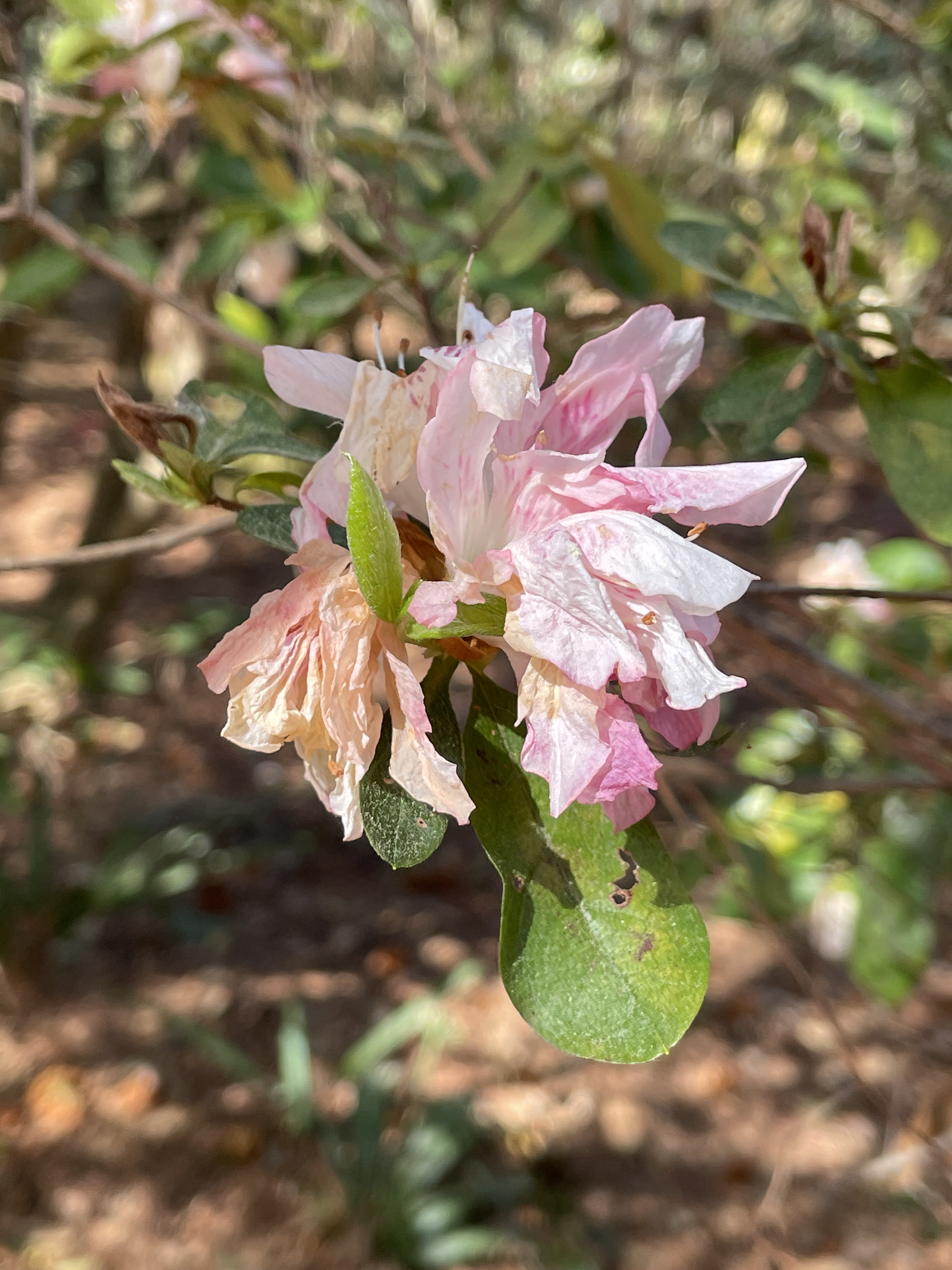
- Ovulinia petal blight caused by O. azaleae

Scientific classification
- Domain: Eukaryota
- Kingdom: Fungi
- Division: Ascomycota
- Class: Leotiomycetes
- Order: Helotiales
- Family: Sclerotiniaceae
- Genus: Ovulinia
- Species: O. azaleae

Binomial name
- Ovulinia azaleae F.A.Weiss (1940)

Synonyms
- Sclerotinia azaleae (F.A.Weiss) Dennis (1956)

= Ovulinia azaleae =

Species of fungus

Ovulinia azaleae is a plant pathogen affecting azaleas and rhododendrons.

== Ovulinia petal blight ==
Ovulinia petal blight is commonly referred to as Ovulinia flower blight, Azalea flower blight, and Azalea flower spot. First reported in the 1930s on the Belgian-Indica hybrids, petal blight can attack most azaleas under favorable weather conditions. Infected flowers first exhibit small spots, about 1 mm in diameter, which appear water-soaked. The spots enlarge rapidly and become very slimy, causing entire petals to become slimy and limp, usually within 2–3 days after initial infection. Infected areas of flowers soon become tan or light brown, and eventually entire flowers turn prematurely brown. Infected flowers dry and generally cling to the plant longer than uninfected flowers do. One to 20 (commonly two to five) small, black sclerotia (a fungal resting stage) form on an infected flower 6–8 weeks later. They appear first as small white areas on the dried petals and slowly become dark as they mature.

Caused by the Ovulinia azaleae fungus, the disease develops during periods of moist weather at flowering time. Early- and late-flowering cultivars or species tend to escape the disease. The fungus overwinters as sclerotia on diseased petals adhering to plants, on the soil surface, or in leaf mulch under the bushes. Sclerotia are able to survive for up to two years while in soil. At the beginning of the host's blooming period, the sclerotia germinate and in 3–5 days give rise to small stalked, cup-shaped fruiting bodies (apothecia) filled with spore sacs called asci, which discharge ascospores with sufficient force that they strike the lower blooms above the sclerotia or are carried in air currents to nearby blooms on adjacent plants. In addition to ascospores from cup-shaped fruiting bodies initiating the primary infection, after the primary infection cycle has completed, asexual spores called conidia are able to form and incite further infection; these conidia are dispersed via rain-splash, wind currents, and insect vectors.

The rate of infection is higher when periods of frequent precipitation and warm weather coincide with flowering. Heavy dew or extended periods of misty weather are particularly favorable. Low temperatures at the beginning of the flowering period and dry conditions toward the end of it most likely reduce the infection potential.

Spraying the infested soil with fungicides and removal of the leaf litter beneath infected plants have not been reliable methods of disease control. Sprays applied at or just before bud opening have offered the best means of control. In general, sprays of triadimefon or benomyl applied at weekly intervals throughout the flowering period have controlled the blight and inhibited sclerotium formation. Making sure diseased or disease-carrying plants are not introduced into the growing area reduces the disease potential.

== See also ==
- List of azalea diseases
- List of rhododendron diseases
