= Phaeotrichoconis crotalariae =

Scientific classification
- Kingdom: Fungi
- Division: Ascomycota
- Class: incertae sedis
- Order: incertae sedis
- Family: incertae sedis
- Genus: Phaeotrichoconis
- Species: P. crotalariae

Binomial name
- Phaeotrichoconis crotalariae (M.A.Salam & P.N.Rao) Subram. (1956)

Synonyms
- Trichoconis crotalariae M.A.Salam & P.N.Rao (1954); Phaeotrichoconis terrestris R.Y.Roy & P.C.Gupta [as 'terrestre'] (1967)

Species of fungus

Phaeotrichoconis crotalariae is an ascomycete fungus that is a plant pathogen. In Brazil, it has been found growing as an endophyte on the healthy leaves of fox grape (Vitis labrusca).

== See also ==
- List of foliage plant diseases (Arecaceae)
