= Seimatosporium mariae =

Scientific classification
- Kingdom: Fungi
- Division: Ascomycota
- Class: Sordariomycetes
- Order: Amphisphaeriales
- Family: Sporocadaceae
- Genus: Seimatosporium
- Species: S. mariae

Binomial name
- Seimatosporium mariae (Clinton) Shoemaker

Synonyms
- Cryptostictis mariae (Clinton) Sacc., (1884); Pestalotia mariae G.P. Clinton, (1875); Sarcostroma mariae (Clinton) M. Morelet, (1985); Sarcostroma mariae (Clinton) Nag Raj, (1993)

Species of fungus

Seimatosporium mariae is a plant pathogen.
