= Pestalotiopsis sydowiana =

Scientific classification
- Kingdom: Fungi
- Division: Ascomycota
- Class: Sordariomycetes
- Order: Amphisphaeriales
- Family: Sporocadaceae
- Genus: Pestalotiopsis
- Species: P. sydowiana

Binomial name
- Pestalotiopsis sydowiana (Bres.) B. Sutton, (1961)

Synonyms
- Pestalotia sydowiana Bres., (1895)

Species of fungus

Pestalotiopsis sydowiana is a plant pathogen infecting azaleas, heather, loquats, and rhododendrons.
