= Pestalotia rhododendri =

Scientific classification
- Kingdom: Fungi
- Division: Ascomycota
- Class: Sordariomycetes
- Order: Amphisphaeriales
- Family: Amphisphaeriaceae
- Genus: Pestalotia
- Species: P. rhododendri

Binomial name
- Pestalotia rhododendri (D. Sacc.) Guba (1929)

Synonyms
- Pestalotia versicolor var. rhododendri D. Sacc.

Species of fungus

Pestalotia rhododendri is a fungal plant pathogen infecting azaleas and rhododendrons.

Important diseases: Pestalotiopsis tip blight of conifers, Gray leaf spot

Pestalotia is primarily a secondary pathogen. It is saprophytic on dead and dying tissues and is weakly parasitic infecting wounds under moist conditions.

Tips of conifer branches particularly Leyland cypress, arborvitae and juniper turn brown to grayish in color. Infected bark may be covered in fungal fruiting structures giving the tissue a black sooty appearance. Leaf spots tend to be tan to gray and are often the result of previous damage such as freeze injury, scorching or mechanical wounds.

Dark, disc or cushion-shaped acervuli are formed under the plant epidermis which then splits open revealing the fruiting structures. Conidia are produced on short simple conidiophores within the acervulus.

Conidia are multi-celled with usually three darkly pigmented center cells and clear pointed end cells. Conidia are ellipsoid or fusoid (football-shaped). A diagnostic feature is the two or more clear, whisker-like appendages arising from the end cell
