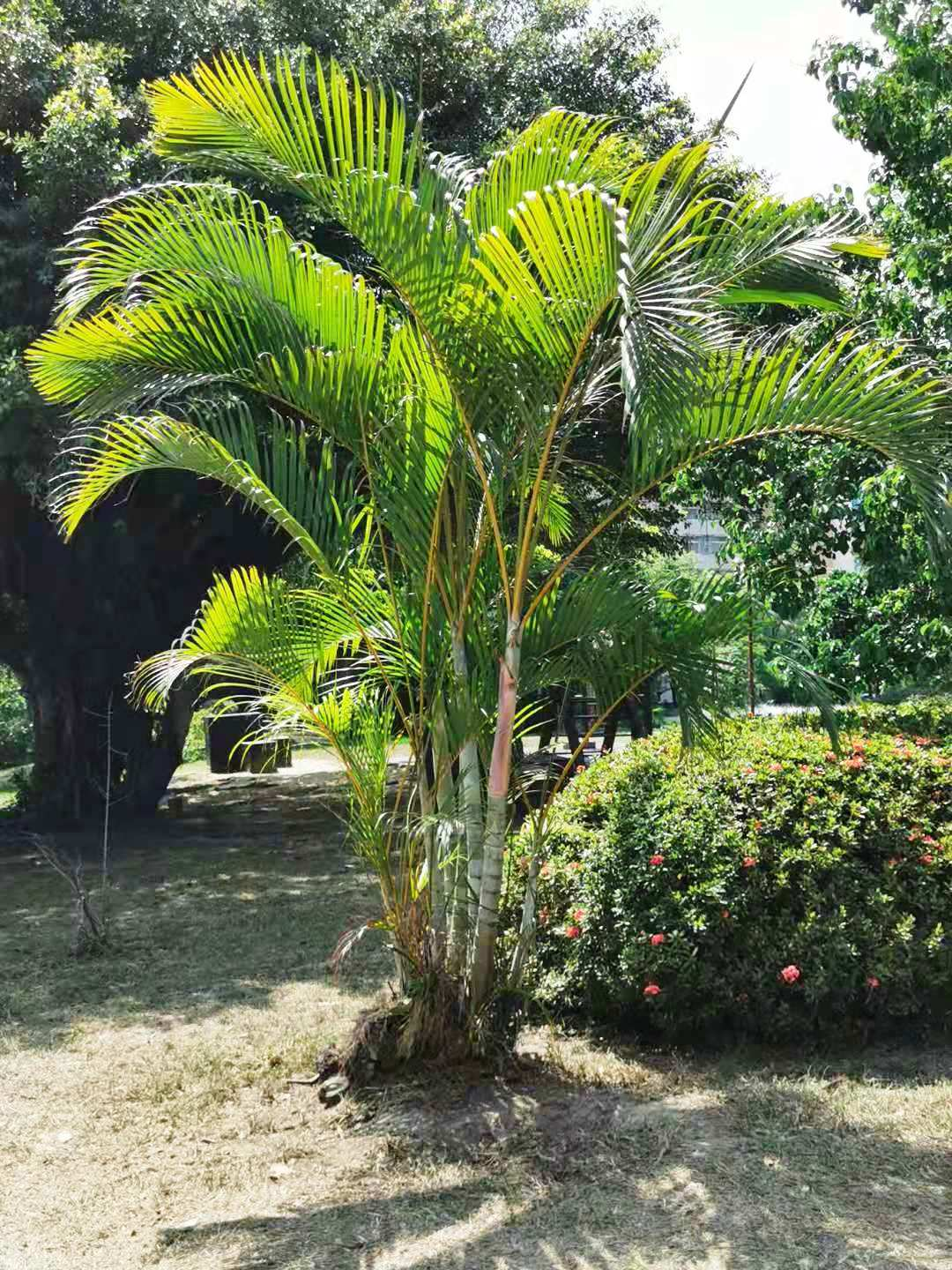

Conservation status
- Near Threatened (IUCN 3.1)

Scientific classification
- Kingdom: Plantae
- Clade: Tracheophytes
- Clade: Angiosperms
- Clade: Monocots
- Clade: Commelinids
- Order: Arecales
- Family: Arecaceae
- Genus: Chrysalidocarpus
- Species: C. lutescens

Binomial name
- Chrysalidocarpus lutescens Wendland (1878)

Synonyms
- Dypsis lutescens (H.Wendl.) Beentje & Dransfield (1995) - homotypic; Areca flavescens Voss (1895); Chrysalidocarpus baronii var. littoralis Jumelle & Perrier (1913); Chrysalidocarpus glaucescens Waby (1923)

= Chrysalidocarpus lutescens =

Species of flowering plant

Chrysalidocarpus lutescens is a species of flowering plant in the family Arecaceae, native to Madagascar. It has since been introduced to the South and Southeast Asia, the Caribbean, and certain islands such as the Canary Islands and Réunion.

== Etymology and names ==
It is known by several common names such as areca palm, bamboo palm, butterfly palm, golden cane palm, and yellow palm. One of the common names, "butterfly palm", refers to the leaves, which curve upwards in multiple stems to create a butterfly look. Due to its yellow colored thin stems, it is called as golden cane palm. As the slender stems resemble that of a bamboo, it is known as bamboo palm. Native names include rehazo and lafahazo (from Malagasy hazo "tree" with reha "pride" and lafa "fibre", respectively).

Chrysalidocarpus lutescens was first described by Hermann Wendland in volume 36 of the journal of Botanische Zeitung in 1878. The genus name 'Chrysalidocarpus' means "golden fruit" in Greek which refers to the color of the fruits. The species name 'lutescens' is derived from Latin 'lutens' meaning "yellow" which might refer to the yellowish stems and flowers of the plant.

== Description ==
Chrysalidocarpus lutescens is a perennial tropical plant, that grows 12–30 ft (3.7–9.1 m) in height and spreads up to 15 ft (4.6 m) wide. Multiple cane-like stems emerge from the base. These smooth stems measure up to 15 cm (5.9 in) in diameter, and consist of rings similar to bamboo. The stem is greyish-green at the bottom and yellowish-green towards the top. The compound leaves are upward-arching, and pinnate, with a yellow midrib. The 1.6–2 m (5 ft 3 in – 6 ft 7 in) long leaves are dark green when young and turn yellowish-green while ageing. A leaf consists of 40 to 60 pairs of lanceolate leaflets, each of which measures up to 60 cm (24 in) in length and 2–2.5 cm (0.79–0.98 in) in width.

The inflorescence grows at the base of the crown, and consists of several branches consisting of small yellow flowers. The female flowers measure up to 3 mm (0.12 in) in diameter, while the male flowers are slightly larger in size. The flowers consist of three sepals and three petals. The androecium consists of 4 mm (0.16 in) long stamens with the anthers to them on the dorsal side. The ovoid shaped fruits are asymmetrical and measure up to 1.7 cm (0.67 in) in length. The fruits are yellow-orange initially, and change color to purple to black on maturation.

== Distribution and habitat ==
Chrysalidocarpus lutescens is native to Madagascar. It has since been introduced to the Andaman Islands, Thailand, Vietnam, Réunion, El Salvador, Cuba, Puerto Rico, the Canary Islands, southern Florida, Haiti, the Dominican Republic, Jamaica, the Leeward Islands, and the Leeward Antilles.

The plant prefers moist, well-drained and mildly acidic (pH 6.1 to 6.5) soils. Though it tolerates sun light, it can be grown in shaded areas as well and exposure to the sun might cause the leaves to dry. In temperate climatic areas, it is generally grown as a houseplant. The plant can be germinated from the seeds or propagated by dividing the base. The seeds are extracted from ripened and matured fruits and should be sown quickly after extraction. Seeds take two to six months to germinate. Stems with some part of the root may be divided and propagated. When grown in pots, the plants grows well with some light and high humidity. However, potted plants do not grow as high as those outdoors. Several cultivars have been developed including dwarf and fast growing varieties. The plants repotted every few years.

The plant has no serious insect or disease problems. It is susceptible to scale, whiteflies, and spider mites. Plants grown outdoors may be subject to phytoplasma disease of palms, which is spread by planthoppers and can cause severe yellowing.

== Uses ==
Chrysalidocarpus lutescens is grown as an ornamental plant in gardens in tropical and subtropical regions, and elsewhere indoors as a houseplant. It has gained the Royal Horticultural Society's Award of Garden Merit. The plant may be massed and used as a landscape specimen, privacy screen, or informal hedge. It can be grown as a tree or shrub. In eastern Madagascar, the is also used in traditional medicine. However, certain parts of the plant contains cyanide compounds and are toxic. It was once used as a source of fibre to make fishing nets. In its introduced range, the plant acts as a supplier of fruit to some bird species such as great kiskadee, bananaquit, and sayaca tanager that feed on it opportunistically in Brazil.

== Gallery ==
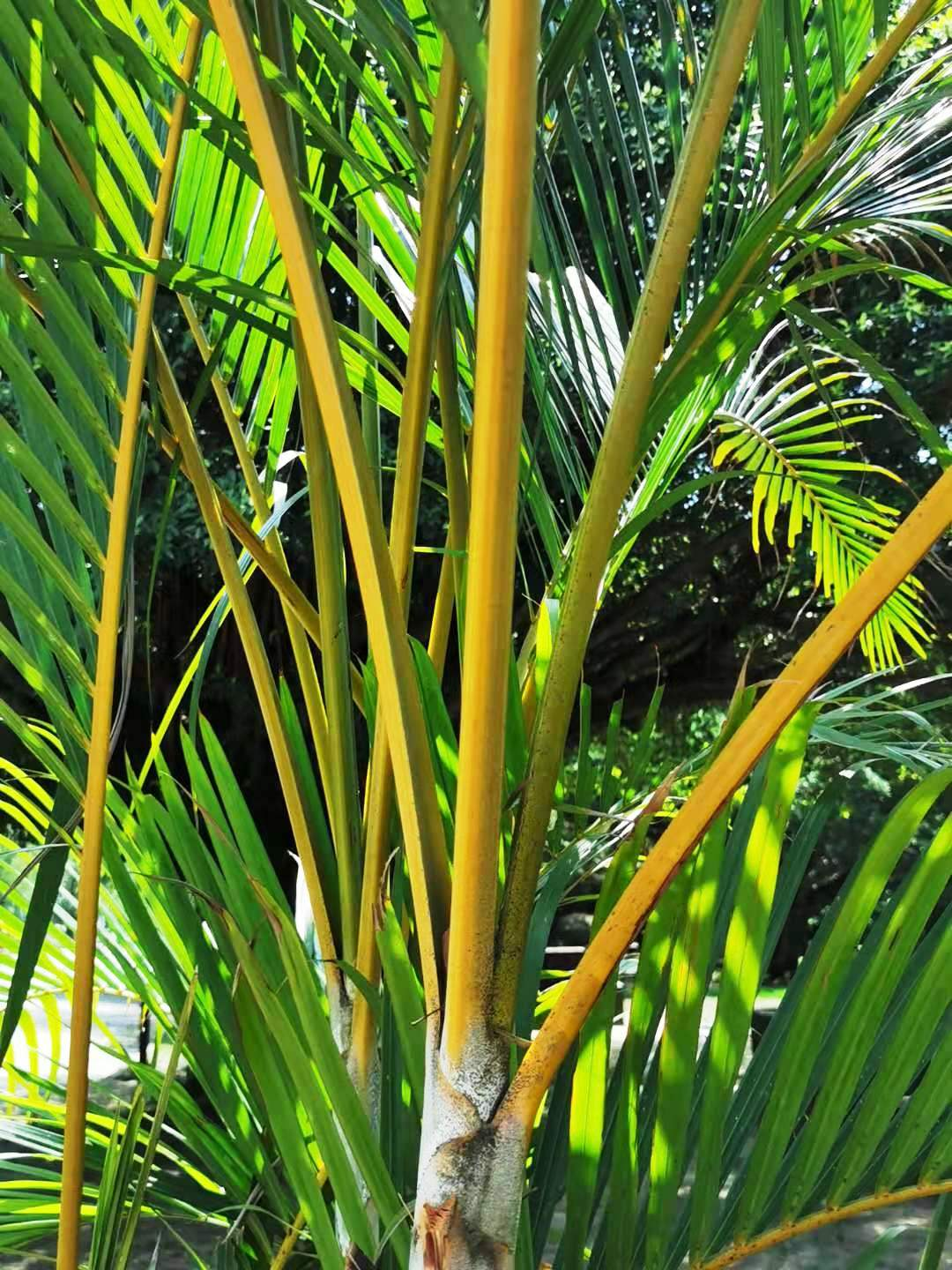
Specimen at National Chung Hsing University, Taiwan

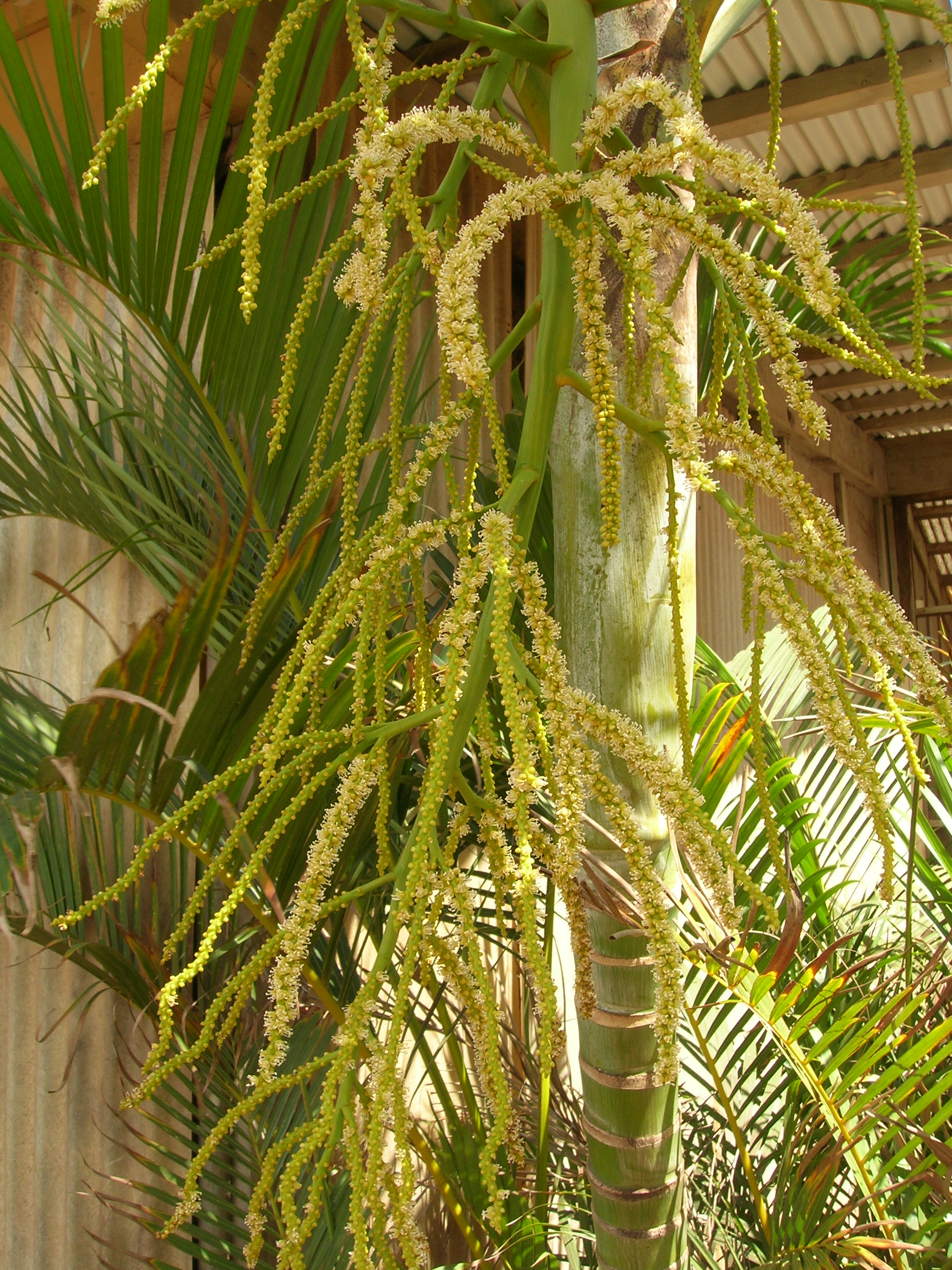
Light-yellow flowers of the plant

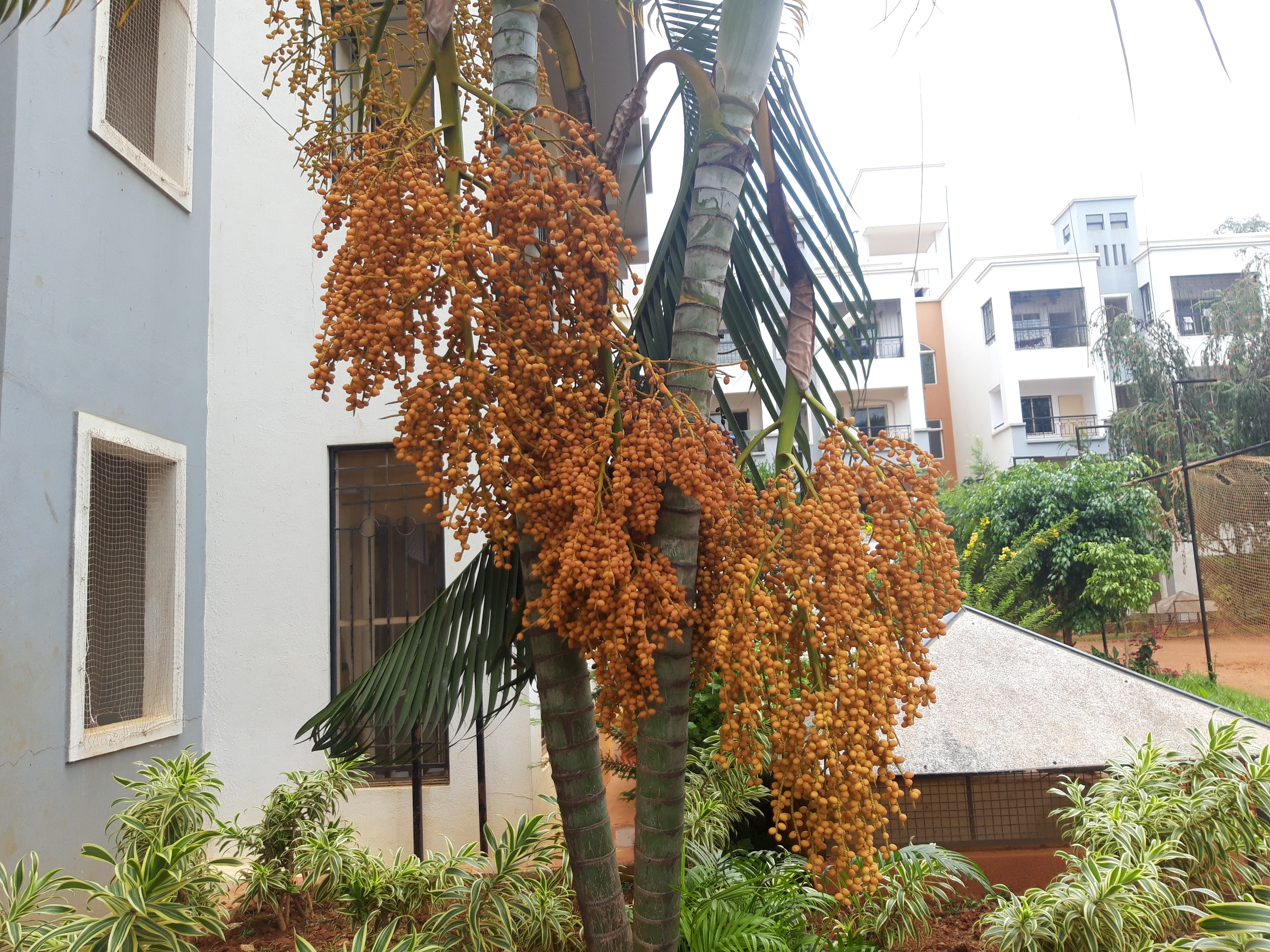
Fruits may appear yellow to orange at specific stages.

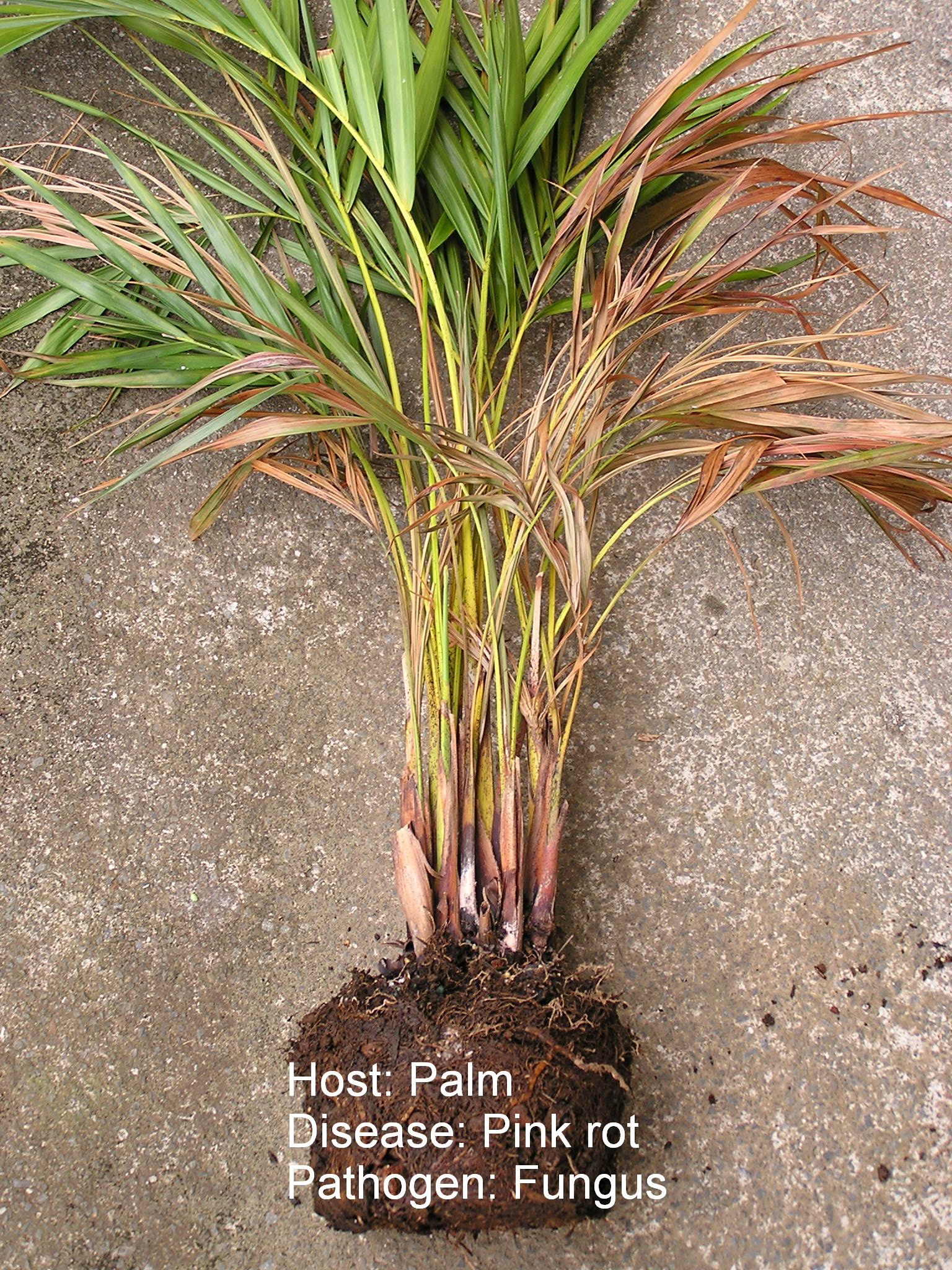
A plant affected by Gliocladium vermoeseni, a fungal disease also called "pink rot"

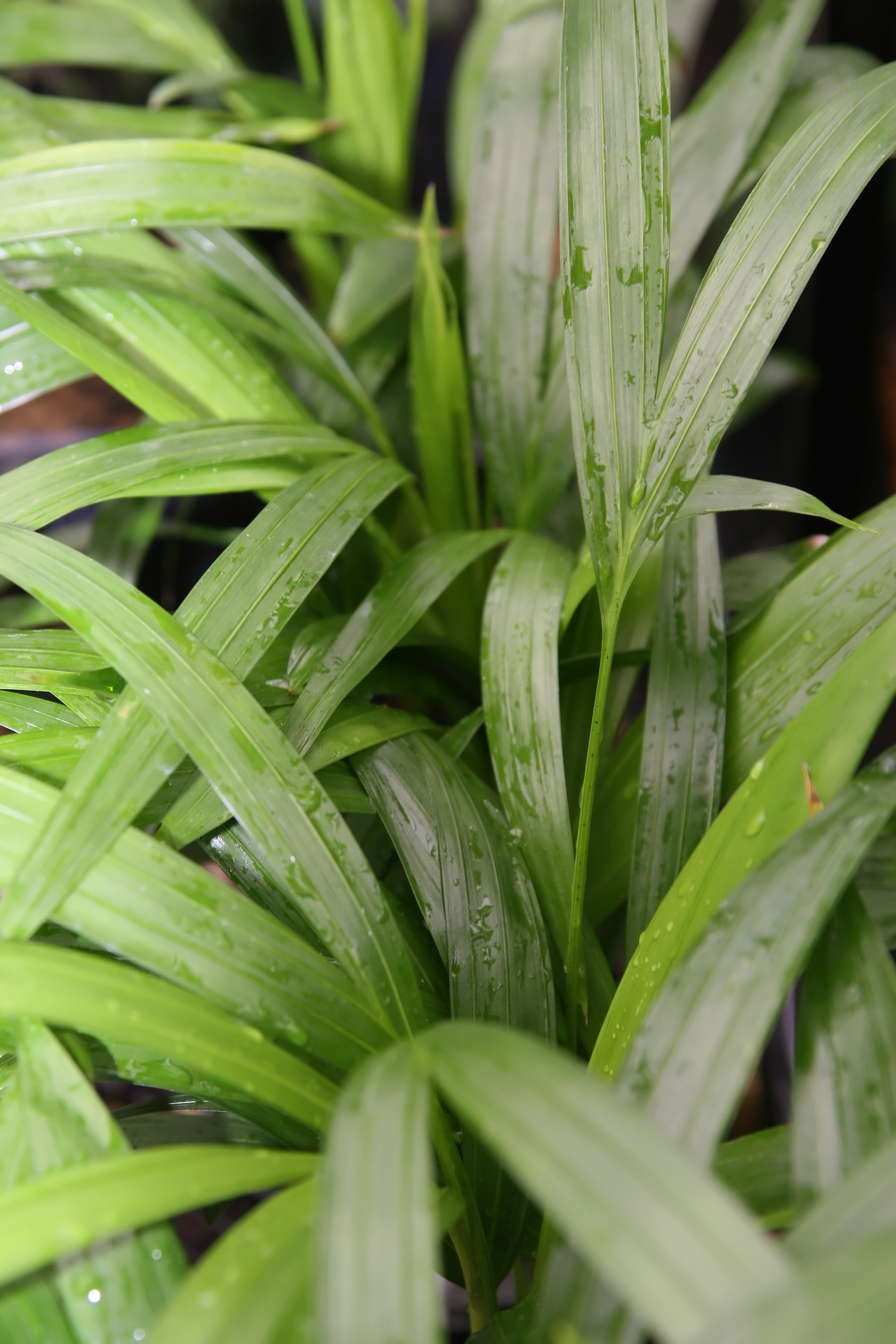
Young plants initially only have two leaves per stem

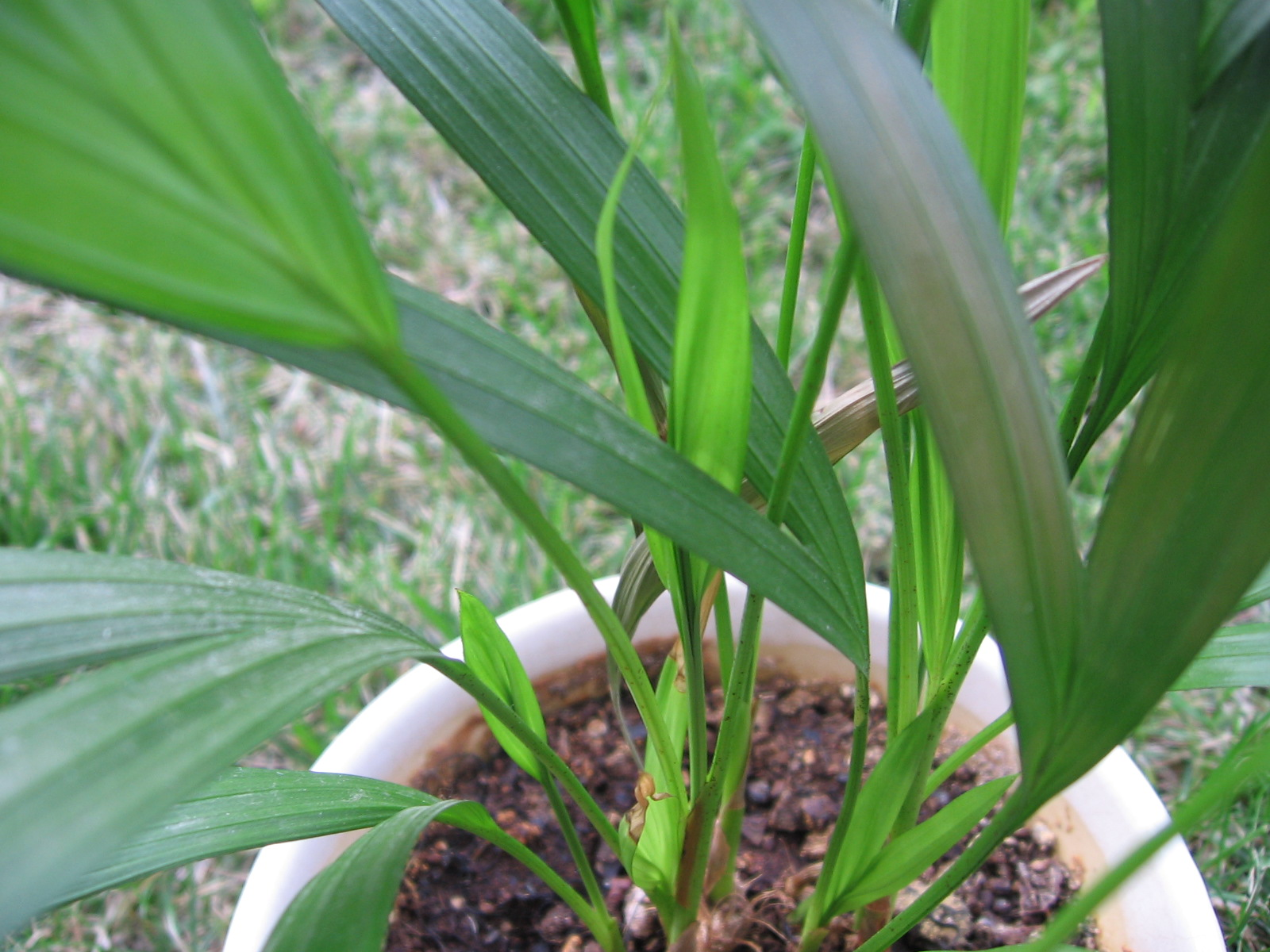
Chrysalidocarpus lutescens as a potted houseplant
