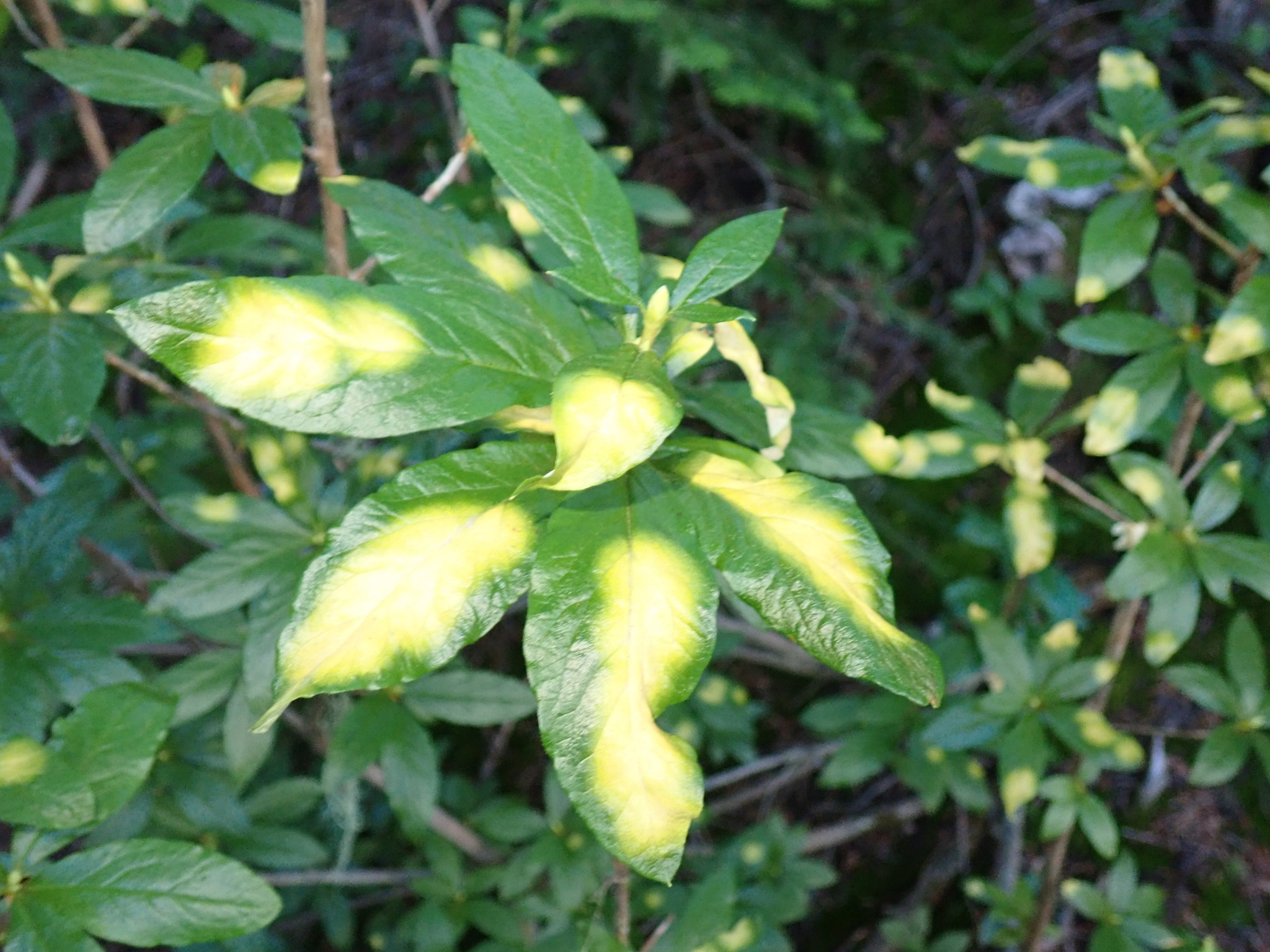

Scientific classification
- Kingdom: Fungi
- Division: Basidiomycota
- Class: Exobasidiomycetes
- Order: Exobasidiales
- Family: Exobasidiaceae
- Genus: Exobasidium
- Species: E. burtii

Binomial name
- Exobasidium burtii Zeller (1934)

= Exobasidium burtii =

Species of fungus

Exobasidium burtii is a species of fungus in the family Exobasidiaceae. It is a plant pathogen.
