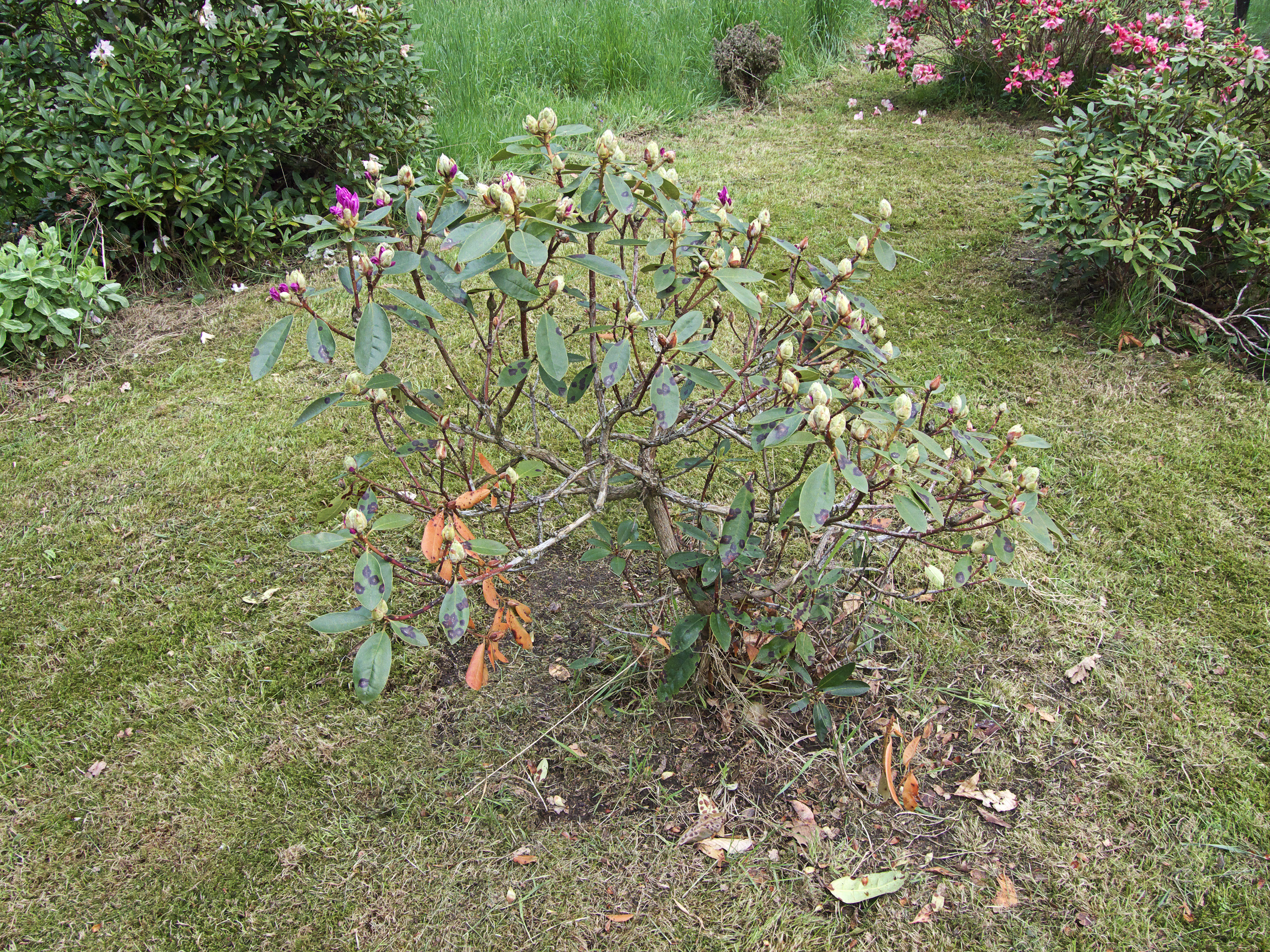
- Cercospora handelii on Rhododendron ponticum

Scientific classification
- Kingdom: Fungi
- Division: Ascomycota
- Class: Dothideomycetes
- Order: Mycosphaerellales
- Family: Mycosphaerellaceae
- Genus: Cercospora
- Species: C. handelii

Binomial name
- Cercospora handelii Bubák, (1909)

Synonyms
- Cercoseptoria handelii (Bubák) Deighton, (1976); Pseudocercospora handelii (Bubák) Deighton, (1987)

= Cercospora handelii =

Species of fungus

Cercospora handelii is a fungal plant pathogen.
