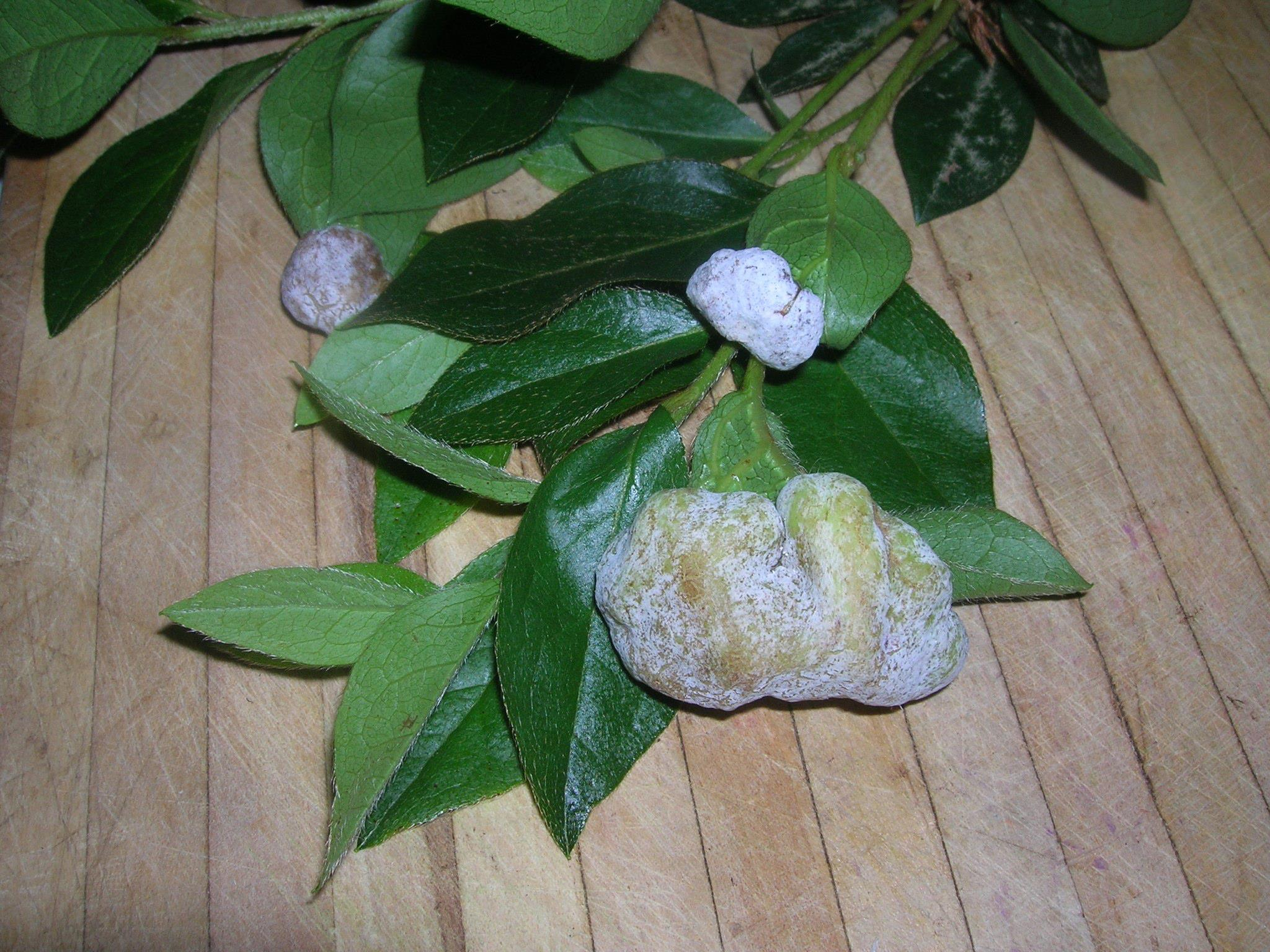

Scientific classification
- Kingdom: Fungi
- Division: Basidiomycota
- Class: Exobasidiomycetes
- Order: Exobasidiales
- Family: Exobasidiaceae
- Genus: Exobasidium
- Species: E. vaccinii
- Variety: E. v. var. japonicum

Trinomial name
- Exobasidium vaccinii var. japonicum (Shirai) McNabb, (1962)

Synonyms
- Exobasidium azaleae sensu auct. eur. p.p.; (2005); Exobasidium caucasicum Woron., (1921); Exobasidium japonicum Shirai, (1896); Exobasidium vaccinii sensu auct. p.p.; (2005)

= Exobasidium vaccinii var. japonicum =

Species of fungus

Exobasidium vaccinii var. japonicum is a plant pathogen.
