= Seifertia azaleae =

Scientific classification
- Kingdom: Fungi
- Division: Ascomycota
- Class: Dothideomycetes
- Order: Pleosporales
- Family: Melanommataceae
- Genus: Seifertia
- Species: S. azaleae

Binomial name
- Seifertia azaleae (Peck) Partr. & Morgan-Jones (2002)

Synonyms
- Briosia azaleae (Peck) Dearn. (1941); Periconia azaleae Peck (1873); Pycnostysanus azaleae (Peck) E.W. Mason (1941); Sporocybe azaleae (Peck) Sacc. (1886)

Species of fungus

Seifertia azaleae is an ascomycete fungus that is a plant pathogen infecting azaleas and rhododendrons.
