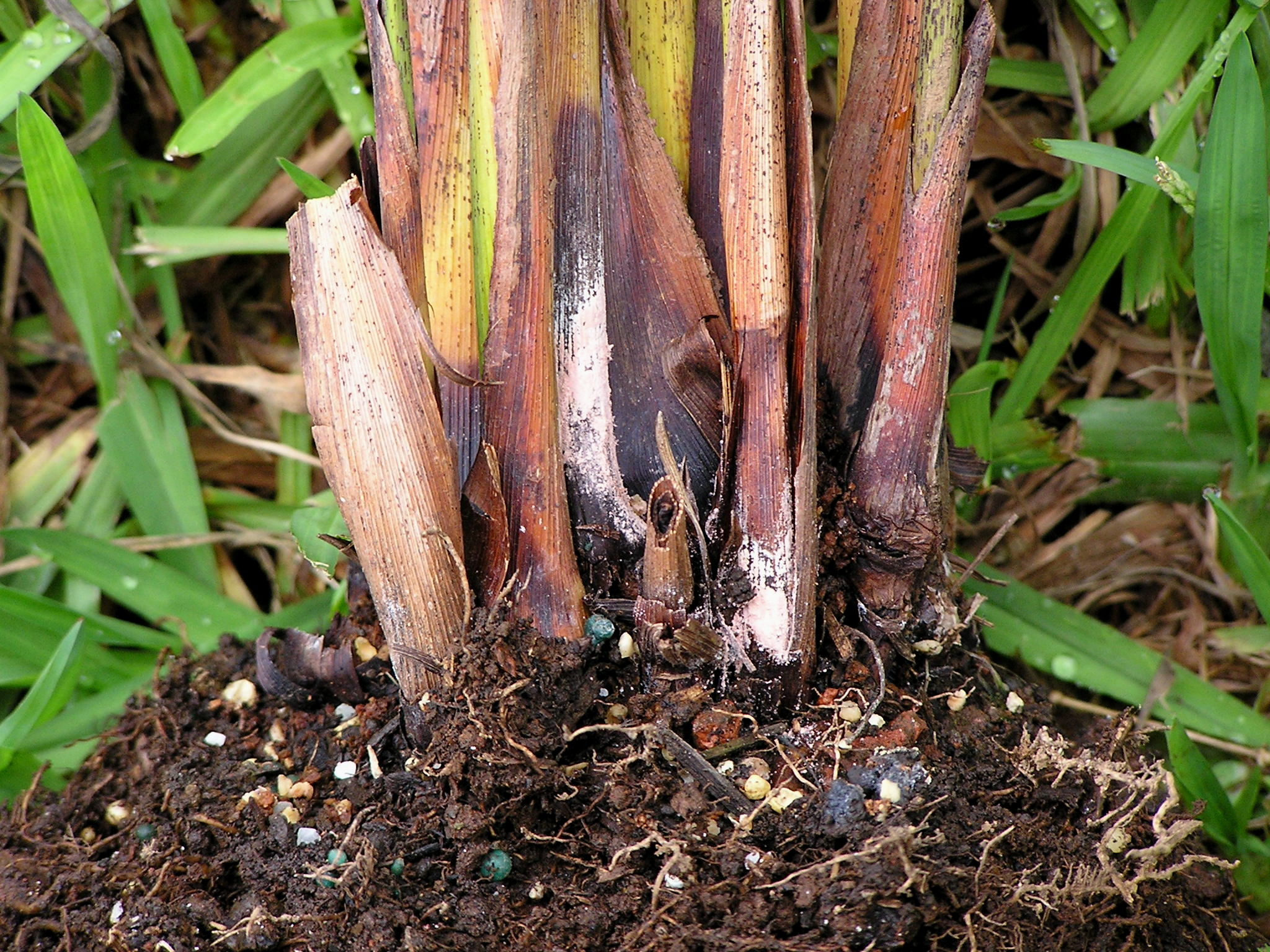
- Pink rot of areca palm (Chrysalidocarpus lutescens) caused by Gliocladium vermoeseni

Scientific classification
- Domain: Eukaryota
- Kingdom: Fungi
- Division: Ascomycota
- Class: Sordariomycetes
- Order: Hypocreales
- Family: Hypocreaceae
- Genus: Gliocladium
- Species: G. vermoeseni

Binomial name
- Gliocladium vermoeseni (Biourge) Thom [as "vermoeseni"], (1930)

Synonyms
- Penicillium vermoesenii Biourge, (1923)

= Gliocladium vermoeseni =

Species of fungus

Gliocladium vermoeseni is a plant pathogen. It is a disease of palm species.
