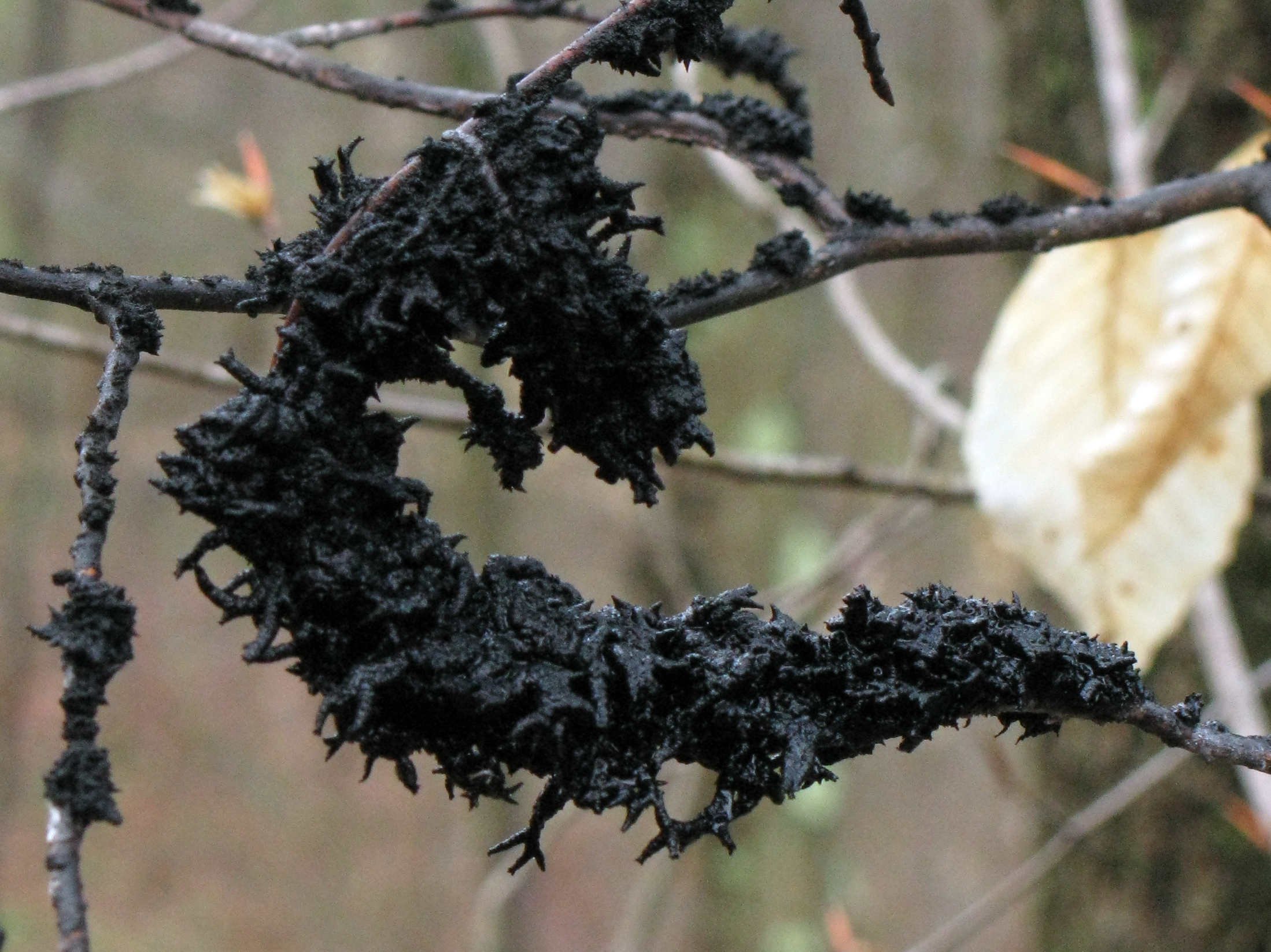
- Scorias spongiosa in Strouds Run State Park, Athens, Ohio

Scientific classification
- Kingdom: Fungi
- Division: Ascomycota
- Class: Dothideomycetes
- Order: Capnodiales
- Family: Capnodiaceae (Sacc.) Höhn. ex Theiss.

Type genus
- Capnodium Mont.

Genera
- See text

= Capnodiaceae =

Family of fungi

The Capnodiaceae are a family of fungi in the Ascomycota, class Dothideomycetes. Species in the family have a widespread distribution, and are especially prevalent in tropical and subtropical areas, as well as temperate rainforests.

== Genera ==
The following genera are included in the placement in Capnodiaceae (with amount of species);

- Capnodium Mont. (83)
- Chaetocapnodium Hongsanan & K.D. Hyde (1)
- Conidiocarpus Woron. (includes Phragmocapnias Theiss. & Syd.) (ca. 10)
- Fumiglobus D.R. Reynolds & G.S. Gilbert (10)
- Leptoxyphium Speg., 1918(19)
- Limaciniaseta D.R. Reynolds (1)
- Readerielliopsis Crous & Decock (2)
- Scoriadopsis Mend. (1)
- Scorias Fr. (11)
- Aithaloderma – tentative
- Anopeltis – tentative
- Antennariella
- Callebaea – tentative
- Capnodaria
- Capnophaeum – tentative
- Ceramoclasteropsis – tentative
- Conidioxyphium
- Echinothecium – tentative
- Fumagospora
- Hyaloscolecostroma – tentative
- Microxyphium
- Phragmocapnias
- Polychaeton – tentative
- Trichomerium
- Tripospermum
