= Myriangium =

Scientific classification
- Kingdom: Fungi
- Division: Ascomycota
- Class: Dothideomycetes
- Order: Myriangiales
- Family: Myriangiaceae
- Genus: Myriangium; Mont. & Berk. (1845)

Type species
- Myriangium duriaei Mont. & Berk. (1845)

Genus of fungi

Myriangium is a genus of fungi within the family Myriangiaceae.

Species Myriangium citri Henn. is an entomopathogenic fungi of armoured scale insects on citrus trees in coastal New South Wales, Australia.

== Species ==
As accepted by Species Fungorum;

- Myriangium acaciae McAlpine (1904)
- Myriangium andinum Speg. (1912)
- Myriangium argentinum (Speg.) Sacc. & P. Syd. (1902)
- Myriangium arxii Tend. (1971)
- Myriangium asterinosporum (Ellis & Everh.) J.H. Mill. (1940)
- Myriangium bambusae Rick (1906)
- Myriangium bauhiniae A. Pande (2008)
- Myriangium catalinae Fairm. (1923)
- Myriangium cinchonae Rehm (1908)
- Myriangium citri Henn. (1908)
- Myriangium curreyoideum (Theiss.) Sacc. & Trotter (1913)
- Myriangium curtisii Berk. & Mont. (1849)
- Myriangium dolichosporum F. Wilson (1889)
- Myriangium duriaei Mont. & Berk. (1845)
- Myriangium floridanum Ellis & Galloway ex Rehm (1909)
- Myriangium grewiae Tend. (1971)
- Myriangium guaraniticum (Speg.) Arx (1963)
- Myriangium haraeanum F.L. Tai & C.T. Wei (1933)
- Myriangium hispanicum J.B. Martínez (1931)
- Myriangium inconspicuum C. Bab. (1855)
- Myriangium indicum Tilak, S.B. Kale & S.V.S. Kale (1971)
- Myriangium kamatii Tend. (1971)
- Myriangium montagnei Berk. (1845)
- Myriangium myrticola Maire & Werner (1938)
- Myriangium parasiticum Tilak, S.B. Kale & S.V.S. Kale (1970)
- Myriangium philippinense Syd. & P. Syd. (1914)
- Myriangium rhipsalidis (Henn.) Höhn. (1909)
- Myriangium rosicola V.G. Rao & A. Pande (1993)
- Myriangium superficiale (Peck & Clinton) M.E. Barr (1986)
- Myriangium tamarindi Tend. (1971)
- Myriangium tectonae Tend. (1971)
- Myriangium thallicola Starbäck (1899)
- Myriangium tuberculans Miles (1922)
- Myriangium tuberculiferum Shirai & Hara (1954)
- Myriangium tunae (Spreng.) Petr. (1929)
- Myriangium uleanum (Henn.) Höhn. (1909)
- Myriangium yunnanense (Pat.) Racib. (1909)
- Myriangium ziziphi Tend. (1971)

Former species;

- M. bambusae Hara (1913) = Myriangium haraeanum
- M. calami (Racib.) Henn. (1900) = Molleriella mirabilis Elsinoaceae family
- M. duriaei' var. thelephorina Starbäck (1899) = Myriangium duriaei
- M. japonicum (Henn. & Shirai) Henn. (1902) = Uleomyces japonicus Cookellaceae
- M. mirabile Henn. (1902) = Uleomyces mirabilis Cookellaceae
- M. pritzelianum Henn. (1901) = Elsinoe pritzeliana Elsinoaceae
- M. sabaleos Weedon (1926) = Myriangiella sabaleos Schizothyriaceae
- M. sulfurea (G. Winter) Henn. (1901) = Myriangiopsis sulfurea Dothideomycetes
- M. thwaitesii Petch (1924) = Angatia thwaitesii Saccardiaceae
