= Elsinoë randii =

Scientific classification
- Domain: Eukaryota
- Kingdom: Fungi
- Division: Ascomycota
- Class: Dothideomycetes
- Order: Myriangiales
- Family: Elsinoaceae
- Genus: Elsinoë
- Species: E. randii

Binomial name
- Elsinoë randii Jenkins & Bitanc. (1938)

Species of fungus

Elsinoë randii is a species of fungus in the Elsinoaceae family. A plant pathogen, it was first formally described in 1938.
