= Elsinoë brasiliensis =

Scientific classification
- Domain: Eukaryota
- Kingdom: Fungi
- Division: Ascomycota
- Class: Dothideomycetes
- Order: Myriangiales
- Family: Elsinoaceae
- Genus: Elsinoë
- Species: E. brasiliensis

Binomial name
- Elsinoë brasiliensis Bitanc. & Jenkins (1942)

Synonyms
- Elsinoë jatrophae Bitanc. & Jenkins (1951); Sphaceloma manihoticola Bitanc. & Jenkins (1951)

Species of fungus

Elsinoë brasiliensis is a species of fungus in the Elsinoaceae family. A plant pathogen, it was first formally described in 1942.
