= Elsinoë mangiferae =

Scientific classification
- Domain: Eukaryota
- Kingdom: Fungi
- Division: Ascomycota
- Class: Dothideomycetes
- Order: Myriangiales
- Family: Elsinoaceae
- Genus: Elsinoë
- Species: E. mangiferae

Binomial name
- Elsinoë mangiferae Bitanc. & Jenkins (1946)

Species of fungus

Elsinoë mangiferae, common name "mango scab", is also known Denticularia mangiferae or Sphaceloma mangiferae (anamorph). It is an ascomycete plant pathogen native to tropical regions and specific for survival on only one host, the mango. Originally described in 1943 from Florida and Cuba specimens, this pathogen has since spread worldwide and is becoming a pathogen of great concern for the mango industries in Australia and India. The species was first described formally in 1946.

== Hosts and symptoms ==
Elsinoë mangiferae produces symptoms superficially similar to anthracnose infections, which are also common on mango. The disease initially presents as small dark brown or gray spots on the underside of leaves or fruit. These spots enlarge and darken over time, developing a velvety or cracked texture in the center of the lesion. The main lifestyle difference between these two is that anthracnose infections are caused by saprotrophic fungi, while E. mangiferae is exclusively a biotrophic pathogen. With severe infections, fruit drop and defoliation may occur, and surviving fruit and plants suffer scarring that reduce their commercial value.

The symptoms of mango scab vary depending on the factors such as the part of the plant that is affected, age of tissue, inoculum potential, water and mineral nutrition. Also, only young tissue is prone to infection. Such as that fruit is no longer prone to infection once it reaches about half size. The appearance of symptoms is dependent on the free water availability when the tissue is at susceptible stages. Few of the symptoms can be mistakenly confused with insect injury or infection from other disease like mango anthracnose.

Confirmation of the presence of mango scab requires microscopic examination of material from fruit, stems or leaves, and culture of the organism. Culture will only be successful from lesions on young plant material. This can only be done by a qualified plant pathologist.

=== Fruit ===
The most distinct symptoms are on the fruit. Fruits will have small black lesions form on young fruit and heavily affected fruits falls off. Fruits can develop into light brown scar and sometimes irregular large scars when lesions join up.

=== Stem, flower and fruit stalk ===
Common symptom on stem is the mass of grey oval to elliptical lesions that are around 1–2 mm in diameter. If the environment is dry, the lesion can turn black in color and small in diameter. These lesions might appear like anthracnose lesions.

=== Leaves ===
Usual symptoms on leaves are brown spots with edge lesions, as well as elongated dark lesions on the lower surface and main veins under the leaves. In wet conditions, numerous tiny brown lesions and holes may form on young leaves that can lead to their defoliation

== Environment ==
Germination of E. mangiferae spores requires a period of moist conditions and free water. The pathogen only infects young tissue, especially newly set fruit. The spores are primarily spread by rain dispersal, over short distances, but heavy rains and irrigation, as well as moisture inclusive microclimate (low ground, etc.) promote conidiation and spread over larger areas.

== Management ==
Control is mainly attempted via regular protective application of copper fungicides, specifically copper hydroxide and copper oxychloride. Increased application schedules are recommended in moist climates and seasons. Benomyl, the systemic benzimidazole fungicide, has also been used as a means to control mango scab infection, but has been out of production since 2001. Reduction of inoculum is also essential for control of this disease. Due to its saprotrophic lifestyle, inoculum can survive on fallen leaves and dead twigs long term, which necessitates the removal or destruction of dead plant material to prevent disease spread. Mango scab is not as common in mango trees because the same fungicide sprayed on the trees for the prevention of the Anthracnose fungus will prevent mango scab from forming.

=== Cultural control ===
Remove or destroy infected plant material that can survive in soil material to prevent infection.

It is helpful to prune away old infected stems to reduce the levels of infection.

=== Chemical control ===
Copper fungicides based sprays (oxychloride, hydroxide or oxide) needs to be applied as soon as the flowers start to emerge and continue to spray until the fruit has set until half size. Usually two to three week intervals till fruit is half size and weekly sprays after in order to protect that fruit from infection.

Wet climate conditions increase the risk of developing and spreading a fungus infection. More frequent applications of the fungicide is needed when these conditions occur since rain can decrease the effectiveness of the treatment.

== Disease cycle ==
Elsinoë mangiferae produces brownish ascocarps in the host epidermis. Globular asci are dispersed in ascocarps, and contain 1–8 hyaline ascocarps.

Host tissues are not most susceptible when young, and they usually decrease in susceptibility as they mature. Rainy weather promotes sporulation of the fungus. One common vectors of mango scab is water splashes from nearby Whether or not conidia and ascospores are infectious is not known.
