= Sphaceloma theae =

Scientific classification
- Domain: Eukaryota
- Kingdom: Fungi
- Division: Ascomycota
- Class: Dothideomycetes
- Order: Myriangiales
- Family: Elsinoaceae
- Genus: Sphaceloma
- Species: S. theae

Binomial name
- Sphaceloma theae Kuros. (1939)

Species of fungus

Sphaceloma theae is a plant pathogen infecting tea.
