= Sphaceloma arachidis =

Scientific classification
- Domain: Eukaryota
- Kingdom: Fungi
- Division: Ascomycota
- Class: Dothideomycetes
- Order: Myriangiales
- Family: Elsinoaceae
- Genus: Sphaceloma
- Species: S. arachidis

Binomial name
- Sphaceloma arachidis Bitanc. & Jenkins (1940)

Species of fungus

Sphaceloma arachidis is a plant pathogen infecting peanuts.

== Disease cycle ==
Sphaceloma arachidis is a fungal pathogen that produces asexual spores known as conidia and microconidia. Both of these spores are stored in acervuli, which are asexual fruiting bodies that have a pad or mat-like shape and are formed below the epidermal tissue of the host. For survival, the spores overwinter in infected debris, and the surviving spores serve as a source of inoculum for the next growing season. A second source of inoculum is also spread during the growing season, making this a polycyclic disease. Like many other fungal pathogens, the common method of dissemination is through wind.

== Hosts and symptoms ==
The disease caused by Sphaceloma arachidis is commonly known as Peanut Scab or Groundnut Scab. As seen by the name, it affects Arachis hypogaea or peanuts. Peanuts are grown in warm areas, which determines where this disease is normally found. It has created difficulties in countries such as Brazil and Argentina that are big peanut exporters. The United States and Africa are also large exporters of the crop.

One of the first symptoms observed are lesions or scabs on the leaves. As the disease progresses, necrosis and hyperplasia begin to affect the plant. The symptoms continue to spread from the leaves to the petioles and stem. It is typical for a scab disease to cause "crustaceous lesions on fruit, tuber, leaf, or stem" and to affect the whole plant.

== Management ==
Control methods for Peanut Scab are typical for other fungi as well. The most successful form of management is resistance, whether that is complete or partial. As with any disease, diversity in the host and avoiding monocultures can also have reduced disease presence. Another form of management includes sanitation efforts of moving the infected debris that the pathogen survives in so there is no inoculum present when new seeds are planted. Inoculum present at the time of planting can increase disease severity. Fungicides are also used but are recommended with other management practices to be most effective.
