= Sphaceloma perseae =

Scientific classification
- Kingdom: Fungi
- Division: Ascomycota
- Class: Dothideomycetes
- Order: Myriangiales
- Family: Elsinoaceae
- Genus: Sphaceloma
- Species: S. perseae

Binomial name
- Sphaceloma perseae Jenkins (1934)

Species of fungus

Sphaceloma perseae is a plant-pathogenic fungus in the division Ascomycota. It infects the avocado plant (Persea americana), a tree native to Central America and Mexico. Currently there are three cultivars of avocados in large-scale agricultural production: Guatemalan, Mexican, and West Indian. The pathogen is currently limited to the P. Americana species but is able to infect all three cultivars. The resulting disease is known as avocado scab for the symptoms which are present on the fruit of the avocado tree. It is believed that the disease developed in Florida in the early twentieth century and is related to citrus scab, Elsinoe fawcetti. Since then, S.perseae has spread to many regions worldwide that support cultivation of the avocado tree. This pathogen threatens the global avocado market, including both importers and exporters of the crop. Countries which import avocados, including the United States, have experienced a rising demand over the past decade which is projected to continue for years to come. An understanding of avocado scab characteristics and feasible prevention methods is essential to maintenance of cultures and economies influenced by the avocado fruit.

== Environment ==
Sphaceloma perseae has the potential to be a problem in all areas around the world that avocados grow. It has been recorded throughout Africa, Central America, South America, Asia, and the West Indies. The incidence increases in regions with higher humidity and moderate climates with frequently cool or warm weather. An exception to this trend is in Australia and New Zealand. To date there has been no avocado scab disease reported in either country. In the places where the pathogen is present, windy conditions are what most favor dispersal of fungal spores. These regions also share rainy weather and prevailing moist conditions which promote sporulation of conidia on infected plant tissue. The cooler areas have seen even higher rates of infection which suggests that the fungus favors these conditions to develop and spread.

== Disease cycle ==
Sphaceloma perseae persists across seasons on avocado in lesions. The pathogen generates acervuli as the asexual fruiting body that erupt from these lesions, present on either fruit or leaves, as small cream or olive-colored masses of clustered conidiophores and spores. During cool, moist weather, conidia may be formed on infected leaves, twigs and fruit. They are carried to infection courts by wind, rain and insects. In Mexico, most spores are produced in the winter prior to active growth, while most lesions were found 6 months later after the fruit set and foliage flush. S. perseae is a pathogen of young tissue. The leaves become resistant one month after emergence and the avocado fruit becomes resistant once it is half-grown. S. perseae is most severe when its host tissue is at a susceptible growth stage and the humidity level remains above 80%. Injuries caused by thrips (insect) create entry wounds for S. perseae and greatly exacerbate scab development.

== Pathogenesis ==
The pathogenic species S. perseae belongs to a class of fungi called dothideomycetes. These fungi are known for producing host-specific phytotoxic metabolites. These toxins are marked for their detrimental interaction with a particular host species while potentially having no effect on other species. These toxins trigger the hypersensitive response upon recognition of the host, which for necrotrophs provides continuing opportunity for the spread of infection. The tissue being damaged on the host becomes a source of nutrient for the pathogen to grow and cause more symptoms. A potential secondary metabolite with phytotoxic properties within the Sphaceloma genus is the variety of pigments called elsinochromes. These are red/orange pigments produced by many Elsinoë and Sphaceloma species. The genus Sphaceloma is the anamorph analog of the genus Elsinoë of which the pigments are named so it is reasonable to presume S. perseae also produces this phytotoxic pigments. Elsinochromes were proven to kill cells of the host plant and even cause necrotic legions on live tissue by reactions of a singlet oxygen species from the pigment. The singlet oxygen breaks down proteins, lipids, and nucleic acids in the plant cells. Toxicity has been demonstrated to decrease in the addition of singlet oxygen quenchers, as they prevent the interaction of the oxygen species with plant cells.

== Symptoms ==
Symptoms on the leaf begin as small lesions that are predominantly red in color. Both upper and lower surfaces of the leaf are susceptible to the disease. The upper surface is more susceptible than the lower surface and in both cases the lesions are concentrated along the veins of the leaf. Overall, the formation of lesions occurs in the higher canopy of the tree. With progression of the disease, lesions may join to form star-like patterns and eventually the centers of the lesions become necrotic and fall away leaving holes in the leaf tissue. Other symptoms include the appearance of infected leaves as shrunken in comparison to healthy leaves and a disfiguration of the leaf shape. After the initial infection, lesions may spread to more parts of the plant such as twigs and leaf petioles.

The symptoms on the fruit are the scabs that the disease is named for. They appear as raised bumps with irregular borders and can be brown or purple in color. The lesions are generally 3mm in diameter but have been measured up to 10mm. The texture of the scabs are rough and cracked which is in contrast to the smooth and shiny avocado skin. The dramatic differences in color and texture make it easy to identify the scabs on host trees. Procession of the infection leads to fusion of the discrete scabs to form larger rutted patches. These areas may crack, exposing the vulnerable tissue underneath and allowing secondary organisms such as Colletotrichum gloeosporioides to penetrate into the fruit tissue and cause anthracnose.

There are no signs of the pathogen visible to the naked eye so observation of fungal structures have to be performed with a microscope. Diagnosis is supported by these distinctive symptoms of avocado scab. The pathogen is host specific and further testing can be done to corroborate the initial identification. Certain polymerase chain reaction (PCR) primers have been designed and tested to consistently identify S. perseae with DNA sequencing techniques. An isolate of the pathogen in pure culture can also be identified by its morphological characteristics and that can be used in diagnosis.

== Control ==
The best strategy for control of avocado scab is to use plant material from accredited suppliers who provide certified disease-free seeds and other propagative material. During the growing season it is important to routinely check crops for symptoms of disease and any unusual pest activity. Thrips are a proven vector of S. perseae spread and target the vulnerable young avocado fruit. Female thrips deposit eggs into the young fruit. The eggs hatch and larvae begin to feed on and damage the skin. The early development of the fruit is a critical time for fungal infection and this overlap with thrip damage exacerbates the infection of the disease. It is important to eliminate or minimize thrips for effective control of scabs. Proven methods for control of thrips consist of cultural practices and biological measures are also continuously being studied. Using a coarse composted mulch around the tree prevents thrips from pupating in the ground beneath the tree itself. Practices involving predatory insects that feed on thrips are being studied for efficiency and cost control.

It is also important to note, in a study carried out by Avila-Quezada et al. (2002) in Michoacan, Mexico, thrip damage was demonstrated to cease after fruit ripening. It seems that thrips are only able to penetrate young avocado tissue. In order to control thrips, common insecticides such as Malathion and Parathion are used as easy pest management options; however, they cannot be used in organic settings. In California, less than 2% of avocado production is organic.

Any other organisms that cause damage to the avocado plant could be considered a threat to the health of the plant; especially in growing regions where some disease is already present. It is important to remove infected fruit as it is the primary source of inoculum, and to perform regular maintenance to allow sun and wind to interact with the foliage completely. These interactions help to keep conditions dry and prevent fungal infections and/or growth. Some fungicides including benomyl, dicopper chloride trihydroxide, copper sulfate and copper hydroxide may be used as flower buds begin to appear on the avocado tree. Mexican varieties bloom the earliest from January through February on average, West Indian varieties bloom during February and March, and Guatemalan varieties from March to April. The respective geographic regions experience drier weather conditions during the blooming periods. It is critical to prevent disease at this time because the plant tissue is most susceptible to infection.

A final means of control is selection for resistant varieties. Like most plants, avocado cultivars demonstrate a spectrum of susceptibility to pathogens. Some cultivars known to be adequately resistant to scab include Choquette, Nadir, and Simmonds.

== Discovery ==
The earliest known published record of Sphaceloma perseae can be traced back to Florida in 1916 when W. J. Krome sent a sample to the Florida Agriculture Research Station. It was believed that the disease had been developing in orchards there and Cuba since at least 1915. W. J. Krome can be attributed to the discovery of the disease, but Anna E. Jenkins, associate mycologist at the Bureau of Plant Industry in Washington, D.C. gave the disease a name in 1934.

== Importance ==
Although the effects of the disease are largely aesthetic, it is known to cause severe losses in crop yield for markets. Avocado scab has not yet affected growers in America in comparison to other countries thanks to preventative measures. However, America has been steadily increasing imports of the fruit due to the increased popularity of consumption. To keep up with increasing demand, America has had to rely on imported avocados for 85% of the total amount sold. The trend of demand seems to be one of general increase over the past 15 years; this makes it important to secure the well-being of global market varieties from diseases such as S. perseae.

The Californian avocado industry produces approximately 95% of the avocados grown in the United States, and approximately 10% of total global production. From this production, nearly all fruit is consumed within the U.S., very little is exported out of the country. Pest importance has risen significantly over recent years, as production struggles to keep up with rising demand. Costs from integrated pest management may soon outweigh the returns from small scale orchards.

The Florida avocado industry brings in nearly $35 million per year, and sells 80% of the crop out-of-state. Its economic impact makes the avocado second only to citrus as the main agricultural crop. The production costs are nearly $3,797 per acre, or $12.66 per bushel, but bring the grower around $5,122 per acre in gross revenue, or about $17.07 per bushel.
