= Pier Andrea Saccardo =

Italian botanist and mycologist (1845–1920)

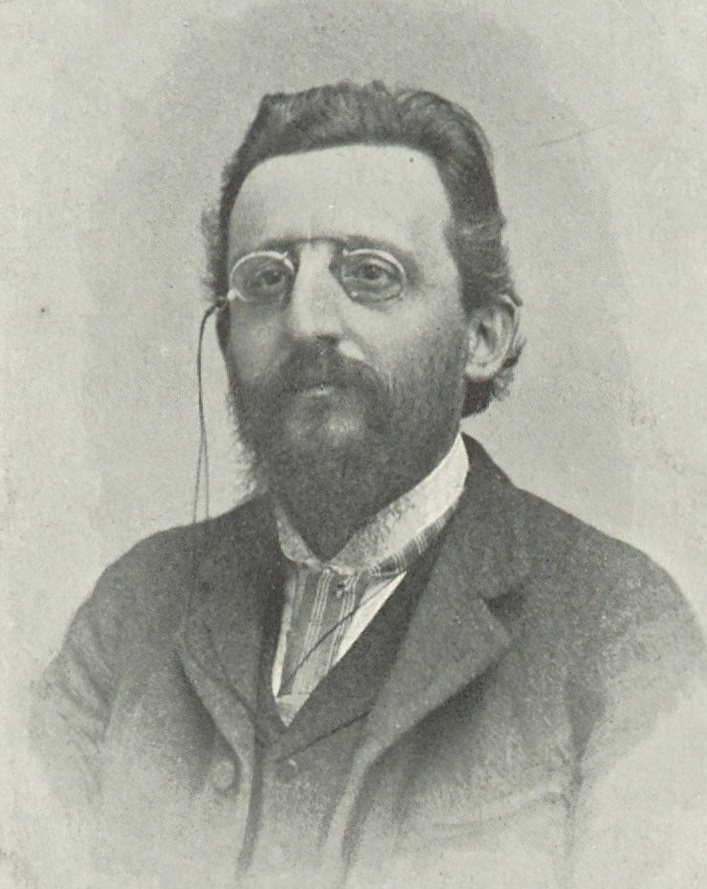
- Saccardo in 1900
- Born: Pier Andrea Saccardo; April 23, 1845; Treviso, Italy
- Died: February 12, 1920 (aged 74); Padua, Italy
- Education: University of Padua
- Scientific career
- Fields: Mycology

Pier Andrea Saccardo (23 April 1845 in Treviso, Treviso – 12 February 1920 in Padua) was an Italian botanist and mycologist. His multi-volume Sylloge Fungorum was one of the first attempts to produce a comprehensive list of identified fungi, using their spore-bearing structures for classification. He was elected to the Linnean Society in 1916 as a foreign member. He also authored a color classification system that he called Chromotaxia and contributed to the Italian translation of Charles Darwin's Insectivorous Plants.

== Life ==
Saccardo was born in the wine growing region of Selva di Montello to Elena Vidotto and engineer Francesco di Selva. He studied at gymnasium of the Venice seminary, the Lyceum in Venice, and then at the Technical Institute of the University of Padua from 1864. At the age of fourteen, he had already put together a herbarium and had made collections of the insects of Treviso. He received a doctorate in 1867 and in the same year married Eleonora Zava. He became an Assistant to Roberto de Visiani (1800-1878), an Italian botanist, naturalist and scholar.

In 1869, he became a professor of Natural History in Padua. He established the mycological journal Michelia, named for his mentor Pier Antonio Micheli, in 1876 and published many of his early mycological papers there. In 1879, he became a professor of Botany and director of the botanical gardens of the university, a post he held until his retirement in November 1915. He accumulated around 70,000 fungal specimens encompassing over 18,500 different species for his herbarium now stored at the university. Saccardo edited two exsiccata series, namely Muschi Trevigiani dissecti / Bryotheca Tarvisina (1864) and Mycotheca Veneta, sistens fungos Venetos exsiccatos (1875-1881).

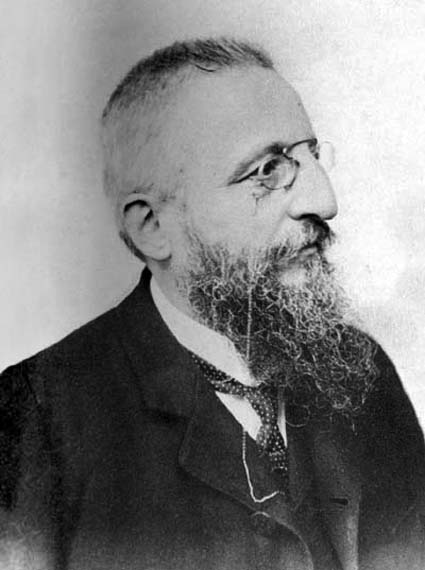
Pier Andrea Saccardo

Saccardo's scientific activity focused almost entirely on mycology. He wrote his first book in 1864 (when he was 19 years old), Flora Montellica: an introduction to the flora Trevigiana. In 1873, he published Mycologiae Venetae Specimen, in which he described some 1200 fungi species. He published over 140 papers on the Deuteromycota (imperfect mushrooms) and the Pyrenomycetes. He was most famous for his Sylloge, begun in 1882, which was a comprehensive list of all of the names that had been used for mushrooms. Sylloge is still the only work of this kind that was both comprehensive for the botanical kingdom Fungi and reasonably modern. Saccardo also developed a system for classifying the imperfect fungi by spore color and form, which became the primary system used before classification by DNA analysis. Saccardo was the most prolific author of fungal species, having formally described 6052 species in his lifetime.

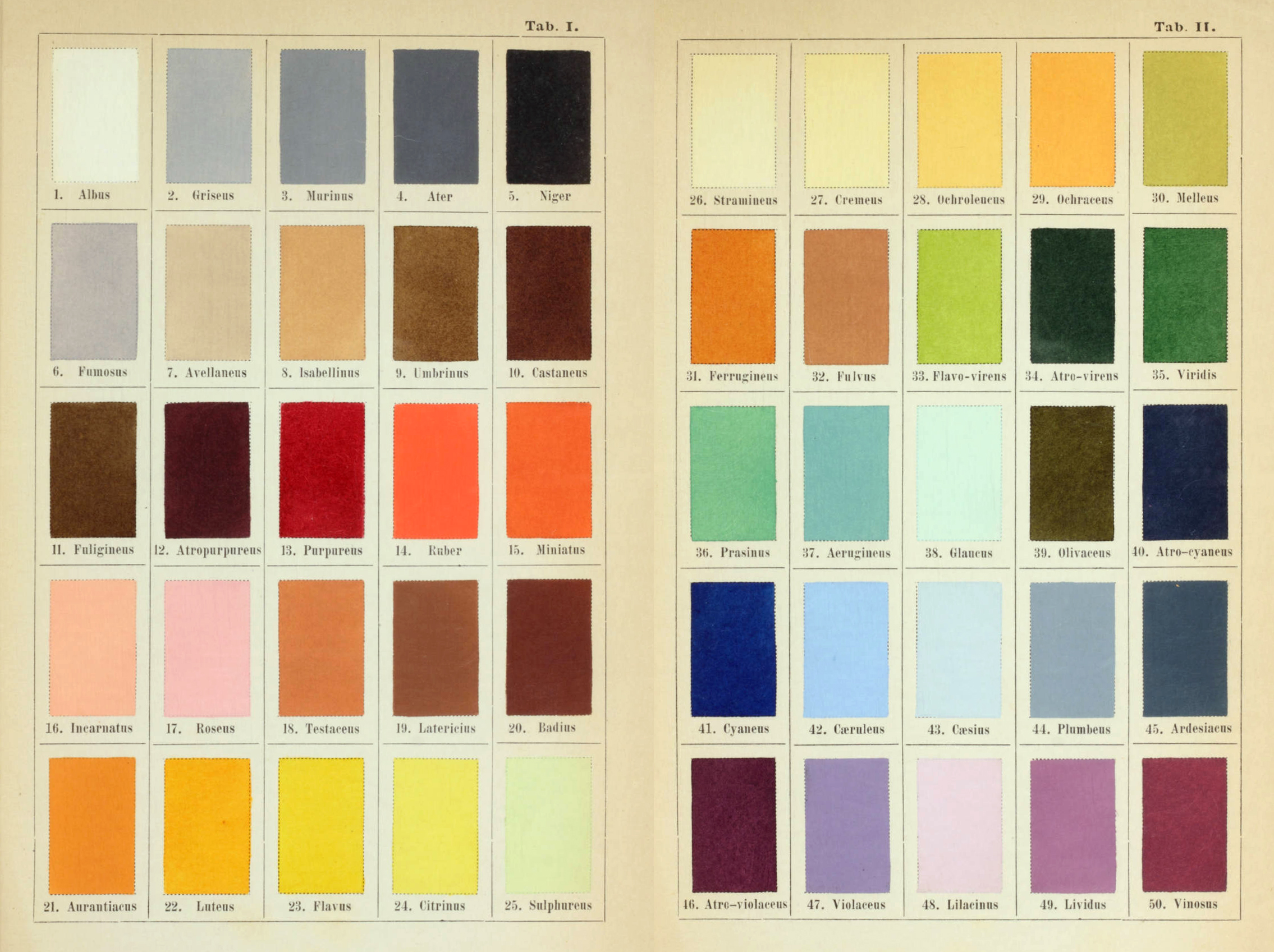
Saccardo's chromotaxy scale

== Chromotaxy scale ==
Saccardo proposed a color scale in 1894, for standardizing color naming of plant descriptions.

== Selected publications ==
Indispensable in the history of mycology is his master work Sylloge fungorum omnium hucusque cognitorum (Padua 1882–90, in nine volumes) followed by the 1931 edition in 25 volumes.

=== Books ===
- Prospetto della Flora Trivigiana (Venice 1864)
- Bryotheca Tarvisina (Treviso 1864)
- Della storia e letteratura della Flora Veneta (Milan 1869)
- Sommario d'un corso di botanica (3rd ed., Padua 1880)
- Musci Tarvisini (Treviso 1872)
- Mycologiae Venetae specimen (Padua 1873)
- Mycotheca Veneta (Padua 1874–79)
- Michelia, commentarium mycologicum (Padua 1877 to 1882, 2 volumes.)
- Fungi italici autographie delineati et colorati (Padua 1877–86, with 1,500 tables)

== Personal life ==
He had a son, Domenico Saccardo (1872–1952), and a daughter, Giuseppina Saccardo-Rasi. The lichenologist Francesco Saccardo (1869–1896) was his nephew. His son-in-law, Alessandro Trotter was involved in the posthumous completion of several of volumes of the Sylloge fungorum.

== Eponyms ==
Saccardo was honoured in the naming of various genera and species;

- Saccardoa Trevis. 1869, (Lichenes), synonym of Pseudocyphellaria Vain., 1890
- Saccardia Cooke 1878 (Saccardiaceae family) in Grevillea 7: 49 in 1878.
- Saccardoella Speg. 1879, (Sordariomycetes class) in Michelia 1(5): 461 in 1879.
- Saccardinula Speg. 1885 (Elsinoaceae family) in Anales Soc. Sci. Argent. 19: 257 in 1885.
- Pasaccardoa Kuntze 1891, (in the Asteraceae family.
- Saccardaea Cavara 1894 now a synonym of Venustosynnema ciliatum.
- Saccardophytum Speg., first published in Anales Soc. Ci. Argent. 53: 181 in 1902, now a synonym of Benthamiella.
- Saccardomyces Henn. 1904 (Trichosphaeriaceae family) in Hedwigia 43: 353 in 1904.
- Phaeosaccardinula Henn. 1905 (Chaetothyriaceae family) in Hedwigia 44: XIV, 67 in 1905.
- Neosaccardia Mattir. 1921 (fungi), synonym of Scleroderma Pers., 1801

== See also ==
- Category:Taxa named by Pier Andrea Saccardo
