= Sphaceloma coryli =

Scientific classification
- Domain: Eukaryota
- Kingdom: Fungi
- Division: Ascomycota
- Class: Dothideomycetes
- Order: Myriangiales
- Family: Elsinoaceae
- Genus: Sphaceloma
- Species: S. coryli

Binomial name
- Sphaceloma coryli Vegh & M.Bourgeois (1976)

Species of fungus

Sphaceloma coryli is a plant pathogen infecting hazelnuts.
