= Sphaceloma menthae =

Scientific classification
- Domain: Eukaryota
- Kingdom: Fungi
- Division: Ascomycota
- Class: Dothideomycetes
- Order: Myriangiales
- Family: Elsinoaceae
- Genus: Sphaceloma
- Species: S. menthae

Binomial name
- Sphaceloma menthae Jenkins (1937)

Species of fungus

Sphaceloma menthae is a plant pathogen infecting mint. It is also known as mint anthracnose or leopard spot disease. It can be identified by circular, oval, or irregular spots on the mint plant. It used to be a serious disease but it now controlled in commercial mint fields.
