= Elsinoë leucospila =

Scientific classification
- Domain: Eukaryota
- Kingdom: Fungi
- Division: Ascomycota
- Class: Dothideomycetes
- Order: Myriangiales
- Family: Elsinoaceae
- Genus: Elsinoë
- Species: E. leucospila

Binomial name
- Elsinoë leucospila Bitanc. & Jenkins (1946)

Species of fungus

Elsinoë leucospila is a species of fungus in the Elsinoaceae family. A plant pathogen, it was first formally described in 1946.
