= Sphaceloma randii =

Scientific classification
- Domain: Eukaryota
- Kingdom: Fungi
- Division: Ascomycota
- Class: Dothideomycetes
- Order: Myriangiales
- Family: Elsinoaceae
- Genus: Sphaceloma
- Species: S. randii

Binomial name
- Sphaceloma randii Jenkins & Bitanc. (1965)

Species of fungus

Sphaceloma randii is a fungus which is a plant pathogen infecting pecan.
