= Elsinoë pyri =

Scientific classification
- Domain: Eukaryota
- Kingdom: Fungi
- Division: Ascomycota
- Class: Dothideomycetes
- Order: Myriangiales
- Family: Elsinoaceae
- Genus: Elsinoë
- Species: E. pyri

Binomial name
- Elsinoë pyri (Woron.) Jenkins (1932)

Synonyms
- Plectodiscella piri Woron. (1914); Elsinoë piri (Woron.) Jenkins (1932); Sphaceloma pyrinum (Peglion) Jenkins (1937)

Species of fungus

Elsinoë pyri is a species of fungus in the family Elsinoaceae. It is a plant pathogen that grows on apple (Pyrus malus). First described scientifically by Nikolai Nikolaevich Woronichin in 1914 as a species of Plectodiscella, the fungus was transferred to the genus Elsinoë by American mycologist Anna Eliza Jenkins in 1932.
