= Black spot leaf disease =

Disease of plants

Black spot
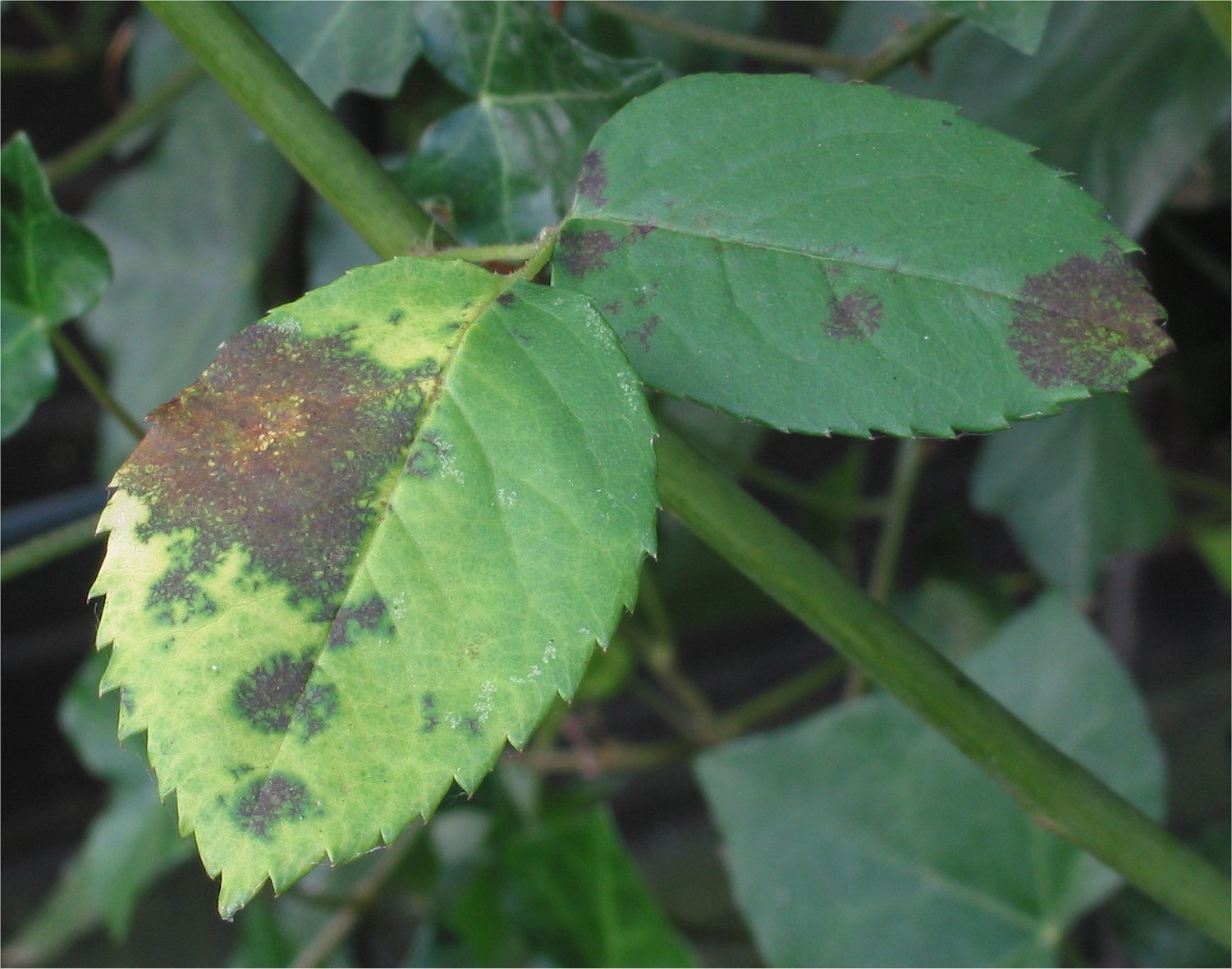
- Causal agents: potassium deficiency fungi
- Hosts: grapevine
- Treatment: pruning fungicides

Black spot leaf disease is a physiological plant disorder that affects some grape varieties such as Concord. It is essentially a potassium deficiency that causes the leaves on a vine to turn purple and eventually black as chlorophyll is lost. For vine growers this lack of chlorophyll inhibits the vine's ability to transmit sugar to the grape, leaving the resulting grapes with a low brix count that may be less than ideal for wine making.

== Causes ==
Black leaf, also known as black spot disease can be caused by different types of fungi and bacteria, most commonly Asterina, Asterinella, Diplotheca, Glomerella, Gnomonia, Schizothyrium, Placosphaeria, and Stigmea. Black leaf can affect many different plant species in a wet, damp climate. It may appear as black spots on leaves, stems, and flowers.

== Prevention and treatment ==
Treating black leaf disease can be achieved in many ways. Some include removing each affected leaf of any yellow or black color. If the infection has spread throughout a larger area, it may be best to remove the affected limb of the plant to reduce further spread. Fungicides may be used as treatment. There are a number of remedies used to prevent the spread of black leaf disease, including mixtures of baking soda, soap, vegetable oil, and water.
