= Elsinoë batatas =

Scientific classification
- Kingdom: Fungi
- Division: Ascomycota
- Class: Dothideomycetes
- Order: Myriangiales
- Family: Elsinoaceae
- Genus: Elsinoë
- Species: E. batatas

Binomial name
- Elsinoë batatas Viégas & Jenkins (1943)

Synonyms
- Sphaceloma batatas Sawada [as 'batatae'] (1931)

Species of fungus

Elsinoë batatas is a species of fungus in the Elsinoaceae family. It is a plant pathogen that affects members of the genus Ipomoea, including the sweet potato. The species was originally described in 1931 as a species of Sphaceloma, and in 1943 was transferred to Elsinoë by Ahmés Pinto Viégas and Anna Eliza Jenkins.
