= Elsinoë theae =

Elsinoe theae

Scientific classification
- Domain: Eukaryota
- Kingdom: Fungi
- Division: Ascomycota
- Class: Dothideomycetes
- Order: Myriangiales
- Family: Elsinoaceae
- Genus: Elsinoë
- Species: E. theae

Binomial name
- Elsinoë theae Bitanc. & Jenkins, (1941)

Species of fungus

Elsinoe theae is a plant pathogen.
