= Anhellia =

Scientific classification
- Kingdom: Fungi
- Division: Ascomycota
- Class: Dothideomycetes
- Order: Myriangiales
- Family: Myriangiaceae
- Genus: Anhellia; Racib. (1900)

Type species
- Anhellia tristis Racib. (1900)

Species
- A. escharoides A. lantanae A. nectandrae A. nigra A. purpurascens A. tabebuiae A. tetracerae A. tristis A. verruco-scopiformans

Genus of fungi

Anhellia is a genus of fungi in the family Myriangiaceae.
