= Butleria (fungus) =

Scientific classification
- Kingdom: Fungi
- Division: Ascomycota
- Class: Dothideomycetes
- Order: Myriangiales
- Family: Elsinoaceae
- Genus: Butleria; Sacc.

Genus of fungi

Butleria is a genus of fungi in the family Elsinoaceae.
