= Elsinoë australis =

Scientific classification
- Domain: Eukaryota
- Kingdom: Fungi
- Division: Ascomycota
- Class: Dothideomycetes
- Order: Myriangiales
- Family: Elsinoaceae
- Genus: Elsinoë
- Species: E. australis

Binomial name
- Elsinoë australis Bitanc. & Jenkins, (1936)

Synonyms
- Sphaceloma australis Bitanc. & Jenkins, (1936); Sphaceloma fawcettii var. viscosa Jenkins, (1933)v

Species of fungus

Elsinoë australis is a fungal plant pathogen that causes sweet orange scab (SOS). The disease only attacks the fruit of citrus trees, causing the formation of pustules and lesions on the skin of the fruit. The spores of the fungus are spread from tree to tree by rain splash. It can be controlled by the use of various fungicides including strobulins and thiophanate methyl.
