= Xenodium =

Scientific classification
- Kingdom: Fungi
- Division: Ascomycota
- Class: Dothideomycetes
- Order: Myriangiales
- Family: Elsinoaceae
- Genus: Xenodium; Syd.

Genus of fungi

Xenodium is a genus of fungi in the family Elsinoaceae.
