= Batata =

Batata may refer to:

== Related to sweet potato (Ipomoea batatas) ==
- Batata, the word for sweet potato in many languages, including Arabic, Hebrew and Spanish
- Elsinoë batatas (sweet potato scab), a plant pathogen
- Fusarium oxysporum f.sp. batatas, a plant pathogen
- Phyllosticta batatas, a plant pathogen

== Related to potato (Solanum tuberosum) ==
- Batata, the word for potato in some variants of Arabic and some Indian languages, including Gujarati, Konkani and Marathi, and Portuguese
- Batata harra, a Lebanese vegetable dish
- Batata vada, an Indian snack from the state of Maharashtra
- Batata palha, a type of French fry in Portugal

== Other uses ==
- Cayo Batata, an island in Puerto Rico
- Batata (footballer, born 1973), Wanderley Gonçalves Barbosa, Brazilian football player
- Batata (footballer, born 2000), Baltazar Costa Rodrigues de Oliveira, Brazilian football player
- Nílton Batata (real name Nílton Pinheiro da Silva), a Brazilian football player
- Roberto Batata (real name Roberto Monteiro, 1949–1976), Brazilian football player
- Sérgio Batata, a Brazilian-born Polish footballer
- Batatá, a regional variant of the name Boi-tatá, a monster from Brazilian indigenous folklore
- Idea Cellular, named after its parent firms
- Batata (film), a 2022 Canadian-Lebanese documentary film
