= Molleriella =

Scientific classification
- Kingdom: Fungi
- Division: Ascomycota
- Class: Dothideomycetes
- Order: Myriangiales
- Family: Elsinoaceae
- Genus: Molleriella; G. Winter

Genus of fungi

Molleriella is a genus of fungi in the family Elsinoaceae.

The genus name of Molleriella is in honour of Adolfo Frederico Möller (1842-1920), who was a Portuguese botanist, who was a gardener and then Inspector of the Botanical Garden in Coimbra.

The genus was circumscribed by Heinrich Georg Winter in Bol. Soc. Brot. vol.4 on page 199 in 1886.
