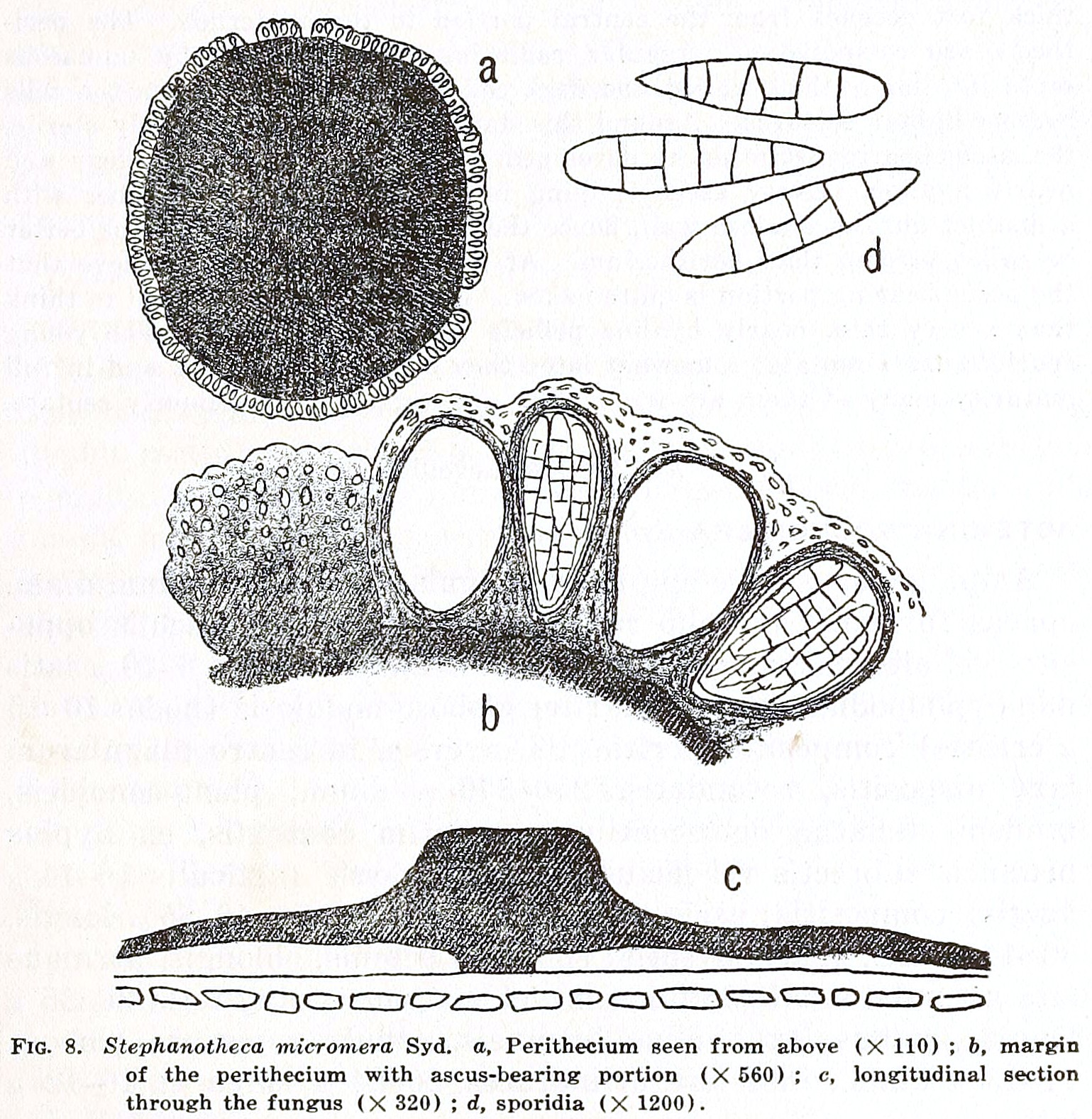
- Stephanotheca micromera

Scientific classification
- Kingdom: Fungi
- Division: Ascomycota
- Class: Dothideomycetes
- Order: Myriangiales
- Family: Elsinoaceae
- Genus: Stephanotheca; Syd. & P. Syd.

= Stephanotheca =

Genus of fungi

Stephanotheca is a genus of fungi in the family Elsinoaceae.
