= Beelia =

Scientific classification
- Kingdom: Fungi
- Division: Ascomycota
- Class: Dothideomycetes
- Order: Myriangiales
- Family: Elsinoaceae
- Genus: Beelia; F. Stevens & R.W. Ryan ex F. Stevens

Genus of fungi

Beelia is a genus of fungi in the family Elsinoaceae.

The genus name of Beelia is in honour of Maurice Philippe Gaspard Beeli (1879-1957), a Belgian botanist from Meise.
