= Sphaceloma =

Scientific classification
- Domain: Eukaryota
- Kingdom: Fungi
- Division: Ascomycota
- Class: Dothideomycetes
- Order: Myriangiales
- Family: Elsinoaceae
- Genus: Sphaceloma de Bary (1874)

Type species
- Sphaceloma ampelinum de Bary (1874)

Species
- Sphaceloma arachidis Sphaceloma coryli Sphaceloma menthae Sphaceloma perseae Sphaceloma poinsettiae Sphaceloma pyrinum Sphaceloma randii Sphaceloma sacchari Sphaceloma theae

Synonyms
- Kurosawaia Hara (1954); Melanobasidium Maubl. (1906); Melanobasis Clem. & Shear (1931); Melanodochium Syd. (1938); Melanophora Arx (1957)

Genus of fungi

Sphaceloma is a genus of ascomycete fungi. Its species are plant pathogens, and cause anthracnose and scab diseases. The widespread genus is estimated to contain 52 species.
