= Schenckiella =

Scientific classification
- Kingdom: Fungi
- Division: Ascomycota
- Class: Dothideomycetes
- Order: Asterinales
- Family: Asterinaceae
- Genus: Schenckiella; Henn., 1893

Type species
- Schenckiella marcgraviae Henn., 1893

Synonyms
- Allothyrium Syd., 1939

Genus of fungi

Schenckiella is a genus of fungi in the Asterinaceae family. The relationship of this taxon to other taxa within the class is unknown (incertae sedis), and it has not yet been placed with certainty into any order. It is a monotypic genus, containing the single species Schenckiella marcgraviae.

The genus was circumscribed by Paul Christoph Hennings in 1893.

The genus name of Schenckiella is in honour of Johann Heinrich Rudolf Schenck (1860–1927), who was a German botanist and native of Siegen. He was a brother to geographer Adolf Schenck (1857–1936).
