= Eurytheca =

Scientific classification
- Kingdom: Fungi
- Division: Ascomycota
- Class: Dothideomycetes
- Order: Myriangiales
- Family: Myriangiaceae
- Genus: Eurytheca; De Seynes (1878)

Type species
- Eurytheca monspeliensis De Seynes (1878)

Species
- Eurytheca abyssinica Eurytheca monspeliensis Eurytheca trinitensis

Genus of fungi

Eurytheca is a genus of fungi in the family Myriangiaceae.
