= Butleria =

Butleria may refer to two different genera:

- Butleria (fungus) Sacc., a genus of fungi
- Butleria (butterfly) Kirby, 1871, a genus of butterflies in the subfamily Heteropterinae
