= E. australis =

E. australis may refer to:

- Elsinoë australis, a plant pathogen species that causes sweet orange scab
- Emex australis, a synonym of Rumex hypogaeus, the doublegee or three-cornered jack, a herbaceous plant species found in South Africa and Australia
- Eubalaena australis, the Southern right whale, a baleen whale species

== See also ==
- Australis (disambiguation)
