= Cazuela =

South American dishes cooked in shallow unglazed earthenware

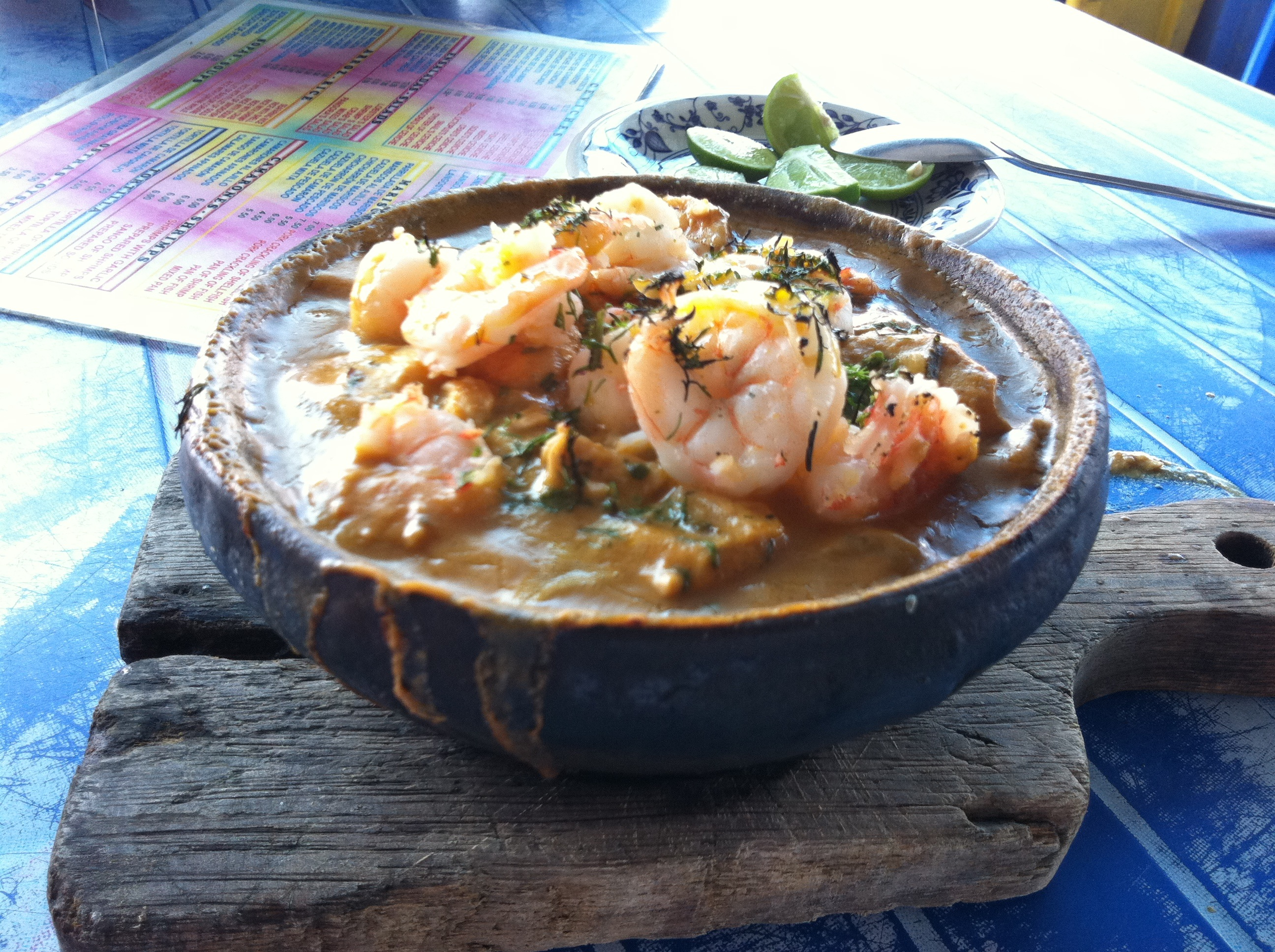
- An Ecuadorian cazuela
- Type: Soup
- Main ingredients: Stock (meats and vegetables)

Cazuela (pronounced [kaˈθwela] or [kaˈswela]) is the common name given to a variety of dishes, especially from South America. It receives its name from the cazuela (Spanish for 'cooking pot')—traditionally, an often shallow pot made of unglazed earthenware used for cooking. The ingredients and preparation vary from region to region, but it is usually a mid-thick flavoured stock obtained from cooking several kinds of meats and vegetables mixed together.

== Chilean cazuelas ==
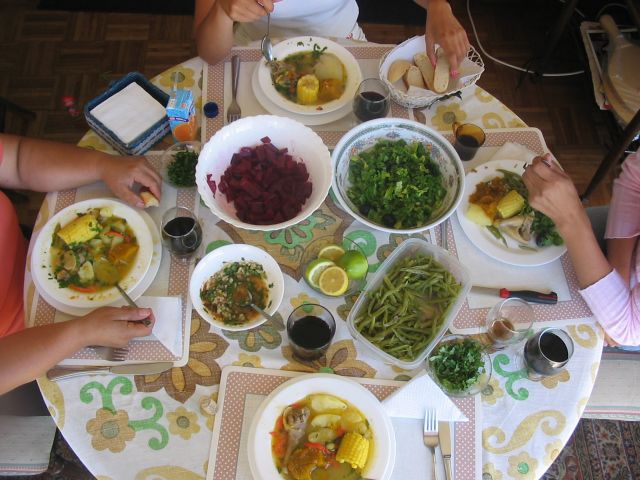
A Chilean cazuela

Cazuela is a typical dish of Chile. The most common types are made of chicken or beef, but there are also other types made from pork, lamb and turkey.

A notable characteristic of Chilean cazuela is that it is made by cooking all the ingredients separately and uniting them when serving on the plate. A typical dish of Chilean cazuela is made by boiling the meat (normally beef or chicken) with chopped onions and carrots. All the rest of the ingredients are boiled separately in individual pots, but the stock from the meat is complemented with the stock from the boiling of the vegetables; the plate is served accompanied of a piece of squash or zapallo camote in Spanish, one big potato or a couple of small potatoes, green beans, previously cooked rice and a piece of sweetcorn. It is normally topped with a bit of fresh coriander, parsley or ají verde.

Cazuela is typically eaten by consuming the liquid stock first, then eating the meat and larger vegetables (e.g. potatoes, large piece of squash or carrot) last. However, the meat and larger vegetables can also be sliced up within the liquid stock and can be eaten simultaneously with the liquid stock. Normally the leftovers are chopped, mixed with green peas and made into another stew called carbonada.

The Chilean cazuela shares roots with a Mapuche stock called "korrü".

== Puerto Rican cazuela ==
Cazuela is a beloved holiday dessert from Puerto Rico, known for its unique crustless style. This treat combines calabaza (Caribbean pumpkin), white sweet potato (batata), and creamy coconut milk. With a texture that hints at both pumpkin pie and bread pudding, it’s typically baked within banana leaves, adding an extra layer of flavor. The recipe includes butter, eggs, sugar, vanilla, and an assortment of warm spices, along with a starch source such as rice flour, all-purpose flour, or leftover bread. They are many variations with some including lard, bread crums, sweet plantains, raisins, cassava, or other types of squash and sweet potato.

Dating back to at least the 19th century, cazuela is deeply embedded in Puerto Rican culture, especially in towns like Loíza. Its rich history showcases a blend of Taíno, Spanish, and African influences. Traditionally made outdoors on a wood-burning stove known as a fogón, it’s wrapped in banana or plantain leaves, which give the dessert a distinctive smoky flavor that enhances its deliciousness.

Cazuela has become a part of a Puerto Rican Thanksgiving. The Americanized version replaces banana leaves for a pie crust and typically served with whipped cream or ice cream.

== Other regional variations ==
In southern Arizona, cazuela (sometimes spelled casuela) is generally made with carne seca or machaca (two varieties of dried beef) with potatoes, garlic, green chiles, and herbs.

== See also ==
- List of soups
