= Potassium deficiency =

Potassium deficiency may refer to:

- Hypokalemia in humans
- Potassium deficiency (plants)
