= Micularia =

Scientific classification
- Kingdom: Fungi
- Division: Ascomycota
- Class: Dothideomycetes
- Order: Myriangiales
- Family: Elsinoaceae
- Genus: Micularia; Boedijn

Genus of fungi

Micularia is a genus of fungi in the family Elsinoaceae.
