= Diplotheca =

Scientific classification
- Kingdom: Fungi
- Division: Ascomycota
- Class: Dothideomycetes
- Order: Myriangiales
- Family: Myriangiaceae
- Genus: Diplotheca; Starbäck (1893)

Type species
- Diplotheca tunae (Spreng.) Starbäck 1893

Species
- D. cerei D. orbicularis D. rhipsalidis D. tunae D. uleana

Genus of fungi

Diplotheca is a genus of fungi in the family Myriangiaceae.
