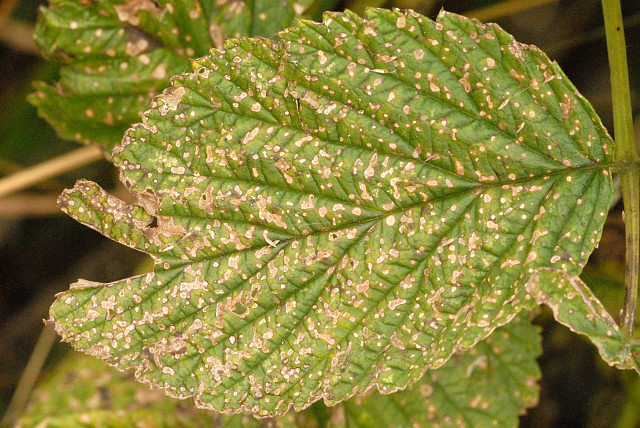

Scientific classification
- Kingdom: Fungi
- Division: Ascomycota
- Class: Dothideomycetes
- Order: Myriangiales
- Family: Elsinoaceae
- Genus: Elsinoë
- Species: E. veneta

Binomial name
- Elsinoë veneta (Burkh.) Jenkins, (1932)

Synonyms
- Ascochyta necans (Ellis & Everh.) Davis, (1924); Gloeosporium necator Ellis & Everh., (1887); Plectodiscella veneta Burkh., (1917); Sphaceloma necator (Ellis & Everh.) Jenkins & Shear, (1946)

= Elsinoë veneta =

Species of fungus

Elsinoë Veneta is a plant pathogen, the causal agent of the anthracnose of raspberry.
