= Saccardinula =

Scientific classification
- Kingdom: Fungi
- Division: Ascomycota
- Class: Dothideomycetes
- Order: Myriangiales
- Family: Elsinoaceae
- Genus: Saccardinula; Speg.

Type species
- Saccardinula guaranitica

Species
- Saccardinula bakeri; Saccardinula circinans; Saccardinula colorata; Saccardinula coricea; Saccardinula costaricensis; Saccardinula myrticola; Saccardinula rickii; Saccardinula tahitensis; Saccardinula usteriana; Saccardinula villaresiae; Saccardinula xylosmicola

Synonyms
- Myxomyriangium Theissen 1913; Pycnodermella _{Petrak 1947}; Pycnopeltis

Genus of fungi

Saccardinula is a genus of fungi in the family Elsinoaceae. The type specimen is at the Swedish Museum of Natural History.
