= Myriangiaceae =

Scientific classification
- Kingdom: Fungi
- Division: Ascomycota
- Class: Dothideomycetes
- Order: Myriangiales
- Family: Myriangiaceae; Nyl. (1854)

Type genus
- Myriangium Mont. & Berk. (1845)

Genera
- Anhellia; Diplotheca; Eurytheca; Myriangium

Family of fungi

The Myriangiaceae are a family of fungi in the Ascomycota, class Dothideomycetes. Species in this family have a widespread distribution (and are especially prevalent in tropical areas), and are typically found associated with scale insects. The family occupies an isolated phylogenetic position within the Dothideomycetes.
