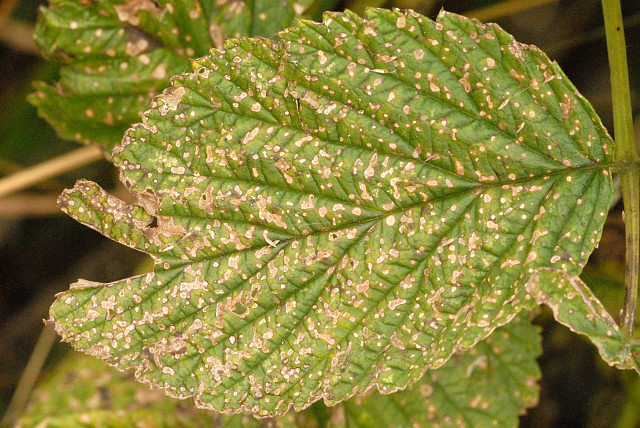
- v veneta

Scientific classification
- Domain: Eukaryota
- Kingdom: Fungi
- Division: Ascomycota
- Class: Dothideomycetes
- Order: Myriangiales
- Family: Elsinoaceae
- Genus: Elsinoë; Racib.

Species
- Elsinoë ampelina Elsinoë australis Elsinoë batatas Elsinoë brasiliensis Elsinoë fawcettii Elsinoë leucospila Elsinoë mangiferae Elsinoë pyri Elsinoë randii Elsinoë rosarum Elsinoë sacchari Elsinoë theae Elsinoë veneta...

= Elsinoë =

Genus of fungi

Elsinoë is a genus of fungi. Many of the species in this genus are plant pathogens.
