= Heinrich Schenck =

German botanist (1860–1927)

Johann Heinrich Rudolf Schenck (31 January 1860 – 25 June 1927) was a German botanist who was a native of Siegen. He was a brother to geographer Adolf Schenck (1857–1936).

Heinrich Schenck initially studied natural sciences at the University of Bonn (1879–80), then continued his studies in Berlin under August Wilhelm Eichler (1839–1887) and Simon Schwendener (1829–1919). Later he returned to Bonn as a student of Eduard Strasburger (1844–1912), receiving his doctorate in 1884. In 1889 he became a lecturer in Bonn, and in 1896 relocated to the Polytechnic Institute of Darmstadt, where he was appointed director of the botanical garden.

Schenck undertook important research involving adaptation of water plants to their underwater environment. He also conducted studies on the ecology, morphology and histology of lianas. In 1886-87 he accompanied Andreas Franz Wilhelm Schimper (1856–1901) on a scientific expedition to Brazil, and in 1908 performed botanical investigations in Mexico.

With George Karsten (1863–1937), he was co-author of the botanical journal Vegetationsbilder. In addition, he published information on botanical collections taken from the German Antarctic Expedition of 1901–1903.

== Selected writings ==
- Tropische Nutzpflanzen, 1903 — Tropical crops
- Mittelmeerbäume, 1905 — Mediterranean trees
- Alpine Vegetation, 1908 — Alpine vegetation
- Süd-Kamtschatka, 1932 with Eric Hultén and George Karsten — Southern Kamchatka.

He also made important contributions to Eduard Strasburger's Lehrbuch der Botanik für Hochschulen.

In 1991, botanist J.Javier Ortíz published Schenckochloa is a monotypic genus of flowering plants belonging to the family Poaceae. It only contains one known species, Schenckochloa barbata (Hack.) J.J.Ortíz from Brazil. The genus is named in honour of Heinrich Schenck.
