= Saccardiaceae =

Scientific classification
- Kingdom: Fungi
- Division: Ascomycota
- Class: incertae sedis
- Order: incertae sedis
- Family: Saccardiaceae; Höhn.

Type genus
- Saccardia Cooke

Family of fungi

The Saccardiaceae are a family of fungi in the Ascomycota phylum. This family can not yet be taxonomically classified in any of the ascomycetous classes and orders with any degree of certainty (incertae sedis). They have a worldwide distribution.

== Genera ==
Genera as accepted by GBIF;

- Angatia H.Sydow, 1914 (5)
- Ascolectus G.J.Samuels & C.T.Rogerson, 1990 (1)
- Cyanodiscus E.Müller & M.L.Farr, 1971 (2)
- Dictyonella von Höhnel, 1909 (7)
- Epibelonium E.Müll. (1)
- Johansonia P.A.Saccardo, 1889 (14)
- Johansoniella Bat., J.L.Bezerra & Cavalc. (1)
- Masonia Hansf., 1944 (2)
- Microphyma (6)
- Myriangiomyces Bat. & Nascim., 1958 (1)
- Phillipsiella Lemmerm. (9)
- Pseudodiscus J.A.von Arx & E.Müller, 1959 (1)
- Rivilata J.Kohlmeyer, B.Volkmann-Kohlmeyer & O.E.Eriksson, 1998 (1)
- Saccardia M.C.Cooke, 1878 (3)
- Schenckiella Henn., 1893 (1)
- Vonarxella A.C.Batista, J.Bezerra & G.E.P.Peres, 1965 (1)

Note: Figures in brackets = how many species per genus
