= Batata harra =

Lebanese vegetable dish

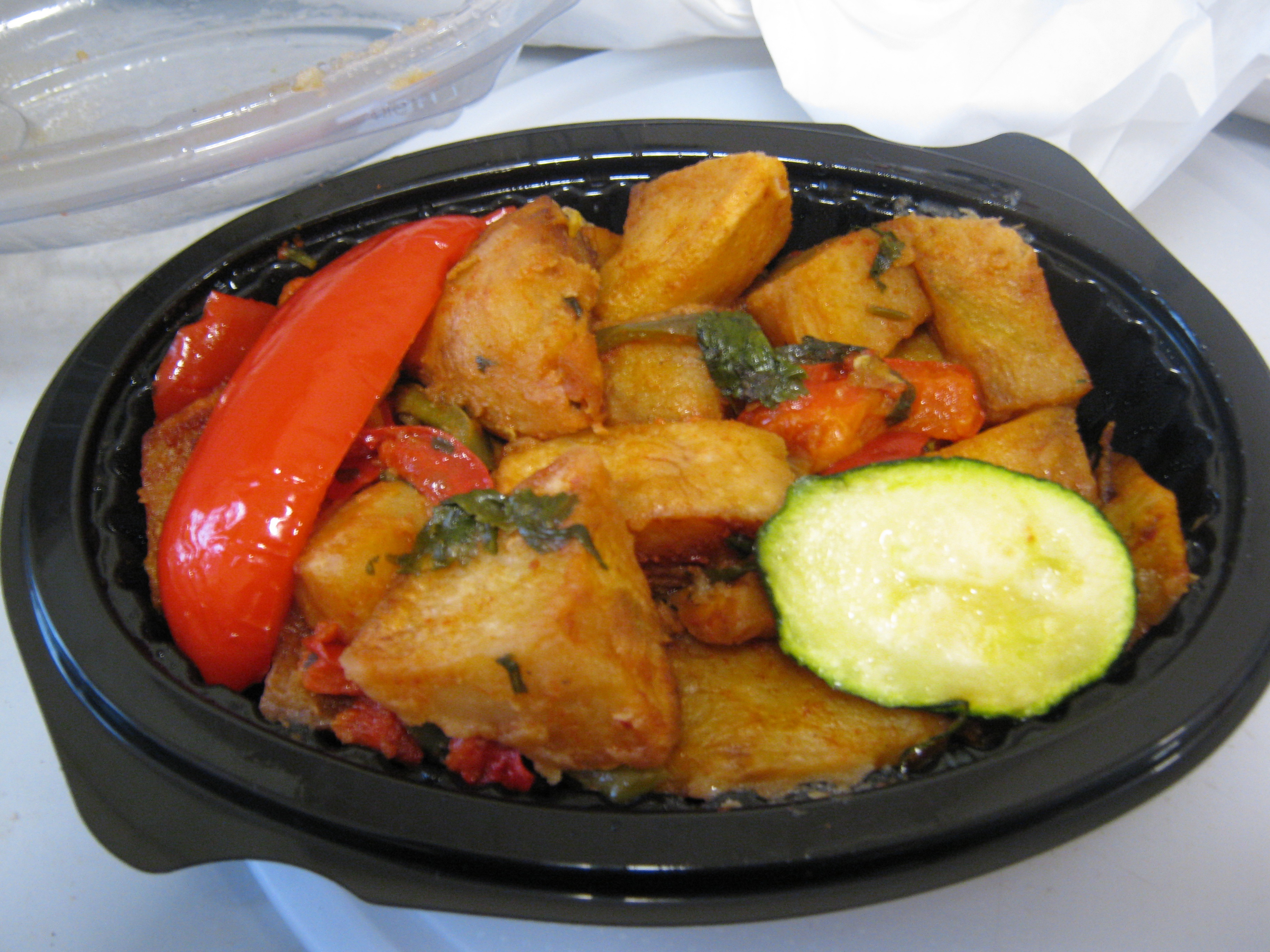
- Region or state: Lebanon, Syria
- Main ingredients: Potatoes, coriander

Batata harra (Arabic: بطاطا حرّة, lit. 'spicy potatoes') is a vegetable dish native to Lebanon and Syria. It consists of potatoes, red peppers, coriander, chili and garlic that are all fried together in olive oil. They can be served plain or in a pita.
