= Adolf Schenck =

German geographer, mineralogist and botanist

Adolf Schenck (4 April 1857 – 15 September 1936) was a German geographer, mineralogist and botanist who was a native of Siegen. He was a brother to botanist Heinrich Schenck (1860-1927).

Schenck studied at the Universities of Berlin and Bonn, obtaining his doctorate in 1884. From 1884 to 1887 he was a geographer on a mineralogical expedition to German Southwest Africa. The expedition was organized by merchant Adolf Lüderitz (1834–1886) and was under the leadership of Karl Höpfner (1857–1900). Several noted scientists participated in the venture, including Swiss botanist Hans Schinz (1868–1941), who performed botanical investigations in the northern part of German Southwest Africa. In the southern part of the colony, Schenck collected minerals and plants, particularly lichens. Prior to returning to Germany, he visited mines and goldfields that are now located in the present-day nations of South Africa, Botswana and Mozambique.

From 1899 to 1922 he was a professor at the University of Halle, and continued working as a lecturer until 1932. As a teacher he gave lectures on the geography of German colonies. Schenck has a handful of African spermatophyte species named after him. In 1887 Schenck returned to Germany and in 1889 he habilitated in geography at the University of Halle, was appointed professor in 1899 and taught mainly colonial geography. In 1905 he was elected a member of the German Academy of Sciences Leopoldina. In 1918 he was appointed a full honorary professor and became emeritus in 1922. He lectured at the University of Halle until 1932.
