= Potassium deficiency (plants) =

Plant disorder

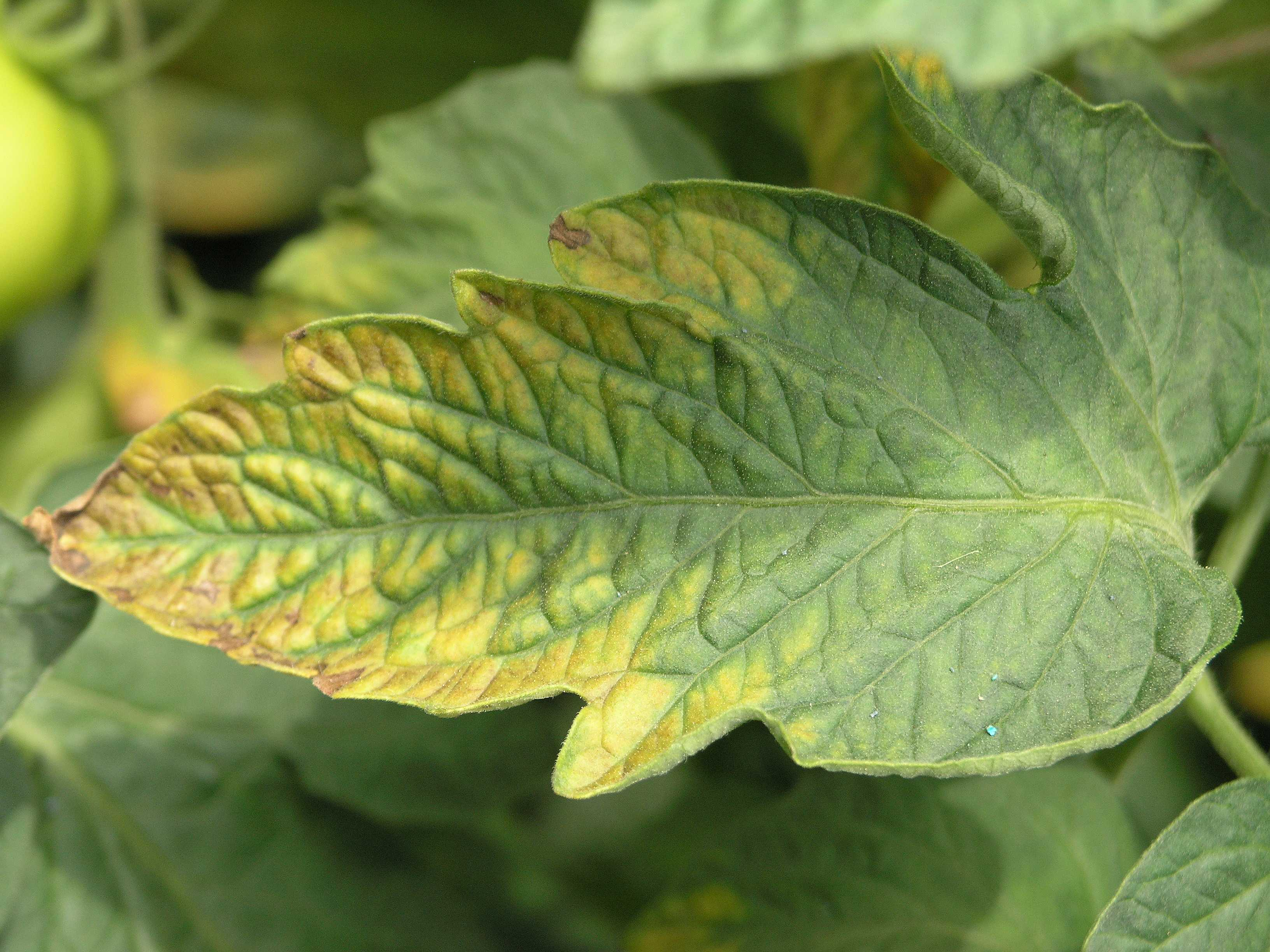
Potassium-deficiency symptoms on a tomato leaf

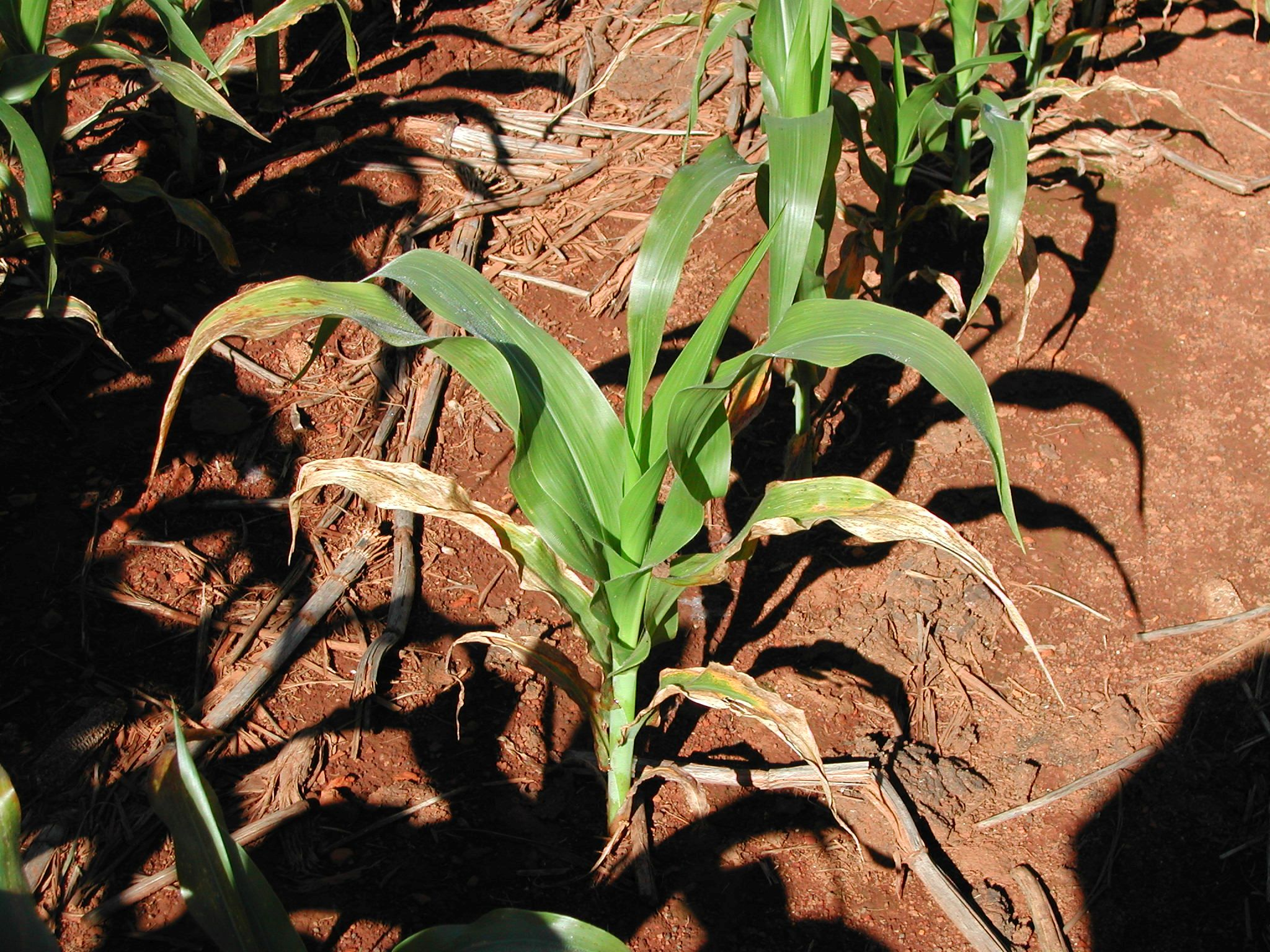
A potassium-deficient maize plant. Necrosis of the leaf margin is most severe on the oldest leaves.

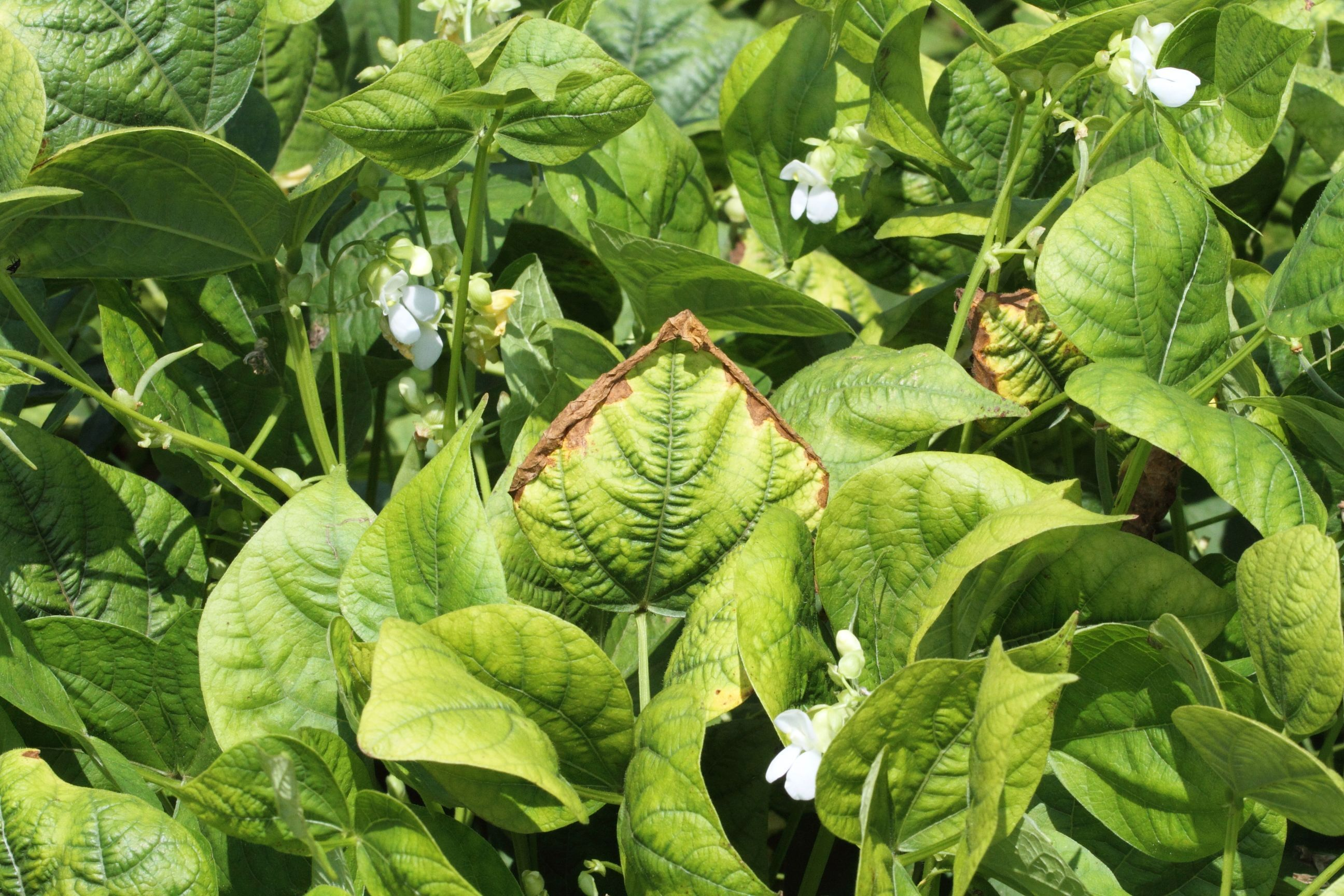
Potassium-deficiency symptoms in beans

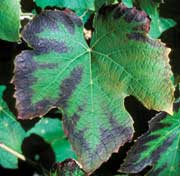
A potassium-deficient grape leaf

Potassium deficiency, also known as potash deficiency, is a plant disorder caused by the depletion of potassium ions (K^{+}) in the soil. Potassium deficiency causes brown scorching and curling of leaf tips, as well as chlorosis (yellowing) between leaf veins. It is most common in light, sandy soils with a low clay content, as potassium is highly soluble and will easily leach from soils that lack colloids.

== Role of potassium in plants ==
The main role of potassium is to provide the ionic environment for metabolic processes in the cytosol, and as such functions as a regulator of various processes including growth regulation. Plants require potassium ions (K^{+}) for protein synthesis and for the opening and closing of stomata, which is regulated by proton pumps to make surrounding guard cells either turgid or flaccid. A deficiency of potassium ions can impair a plant's ability to maintain these processes. Potassium also functions in other physiological processes such as photosynthesis, protein synthesis, activation of some enzymes, phloem solute transport of photoassimilates into source organs, and maintenance of cation:anion balance in the cytosol and vacuole.

== Symptoms of potassium deficiency ==
Typical symptoms of potassium deficiency in plants include brown scorching and curling of leaf tips as well as chlorosis (yellowing) between leaf veins. Purple spots may also appear on the leaf undersides. Plant growth, root development, and seed and fruit development are usually reduced in potassium-deficient plants. Often, potassium deficiency symptoms first appear on older (lower) leaves because potassium is a mobile nutrient, meaning that a plant can allocate potassium to younger leaves when it is K deficient. Deficient plants may be more prone to frost damage and disease, and their symptoms can often be confused with wind scorch or drought.

The deficiency is most common in several important fruit and vegetable crops; notably potatoes, brassicas, tomatoes, apples, currants, gooseberries, and raspberries. Sugar beets, cereals, and clover are also commonly affected. Specific symptoms for each of these plants are as follows:

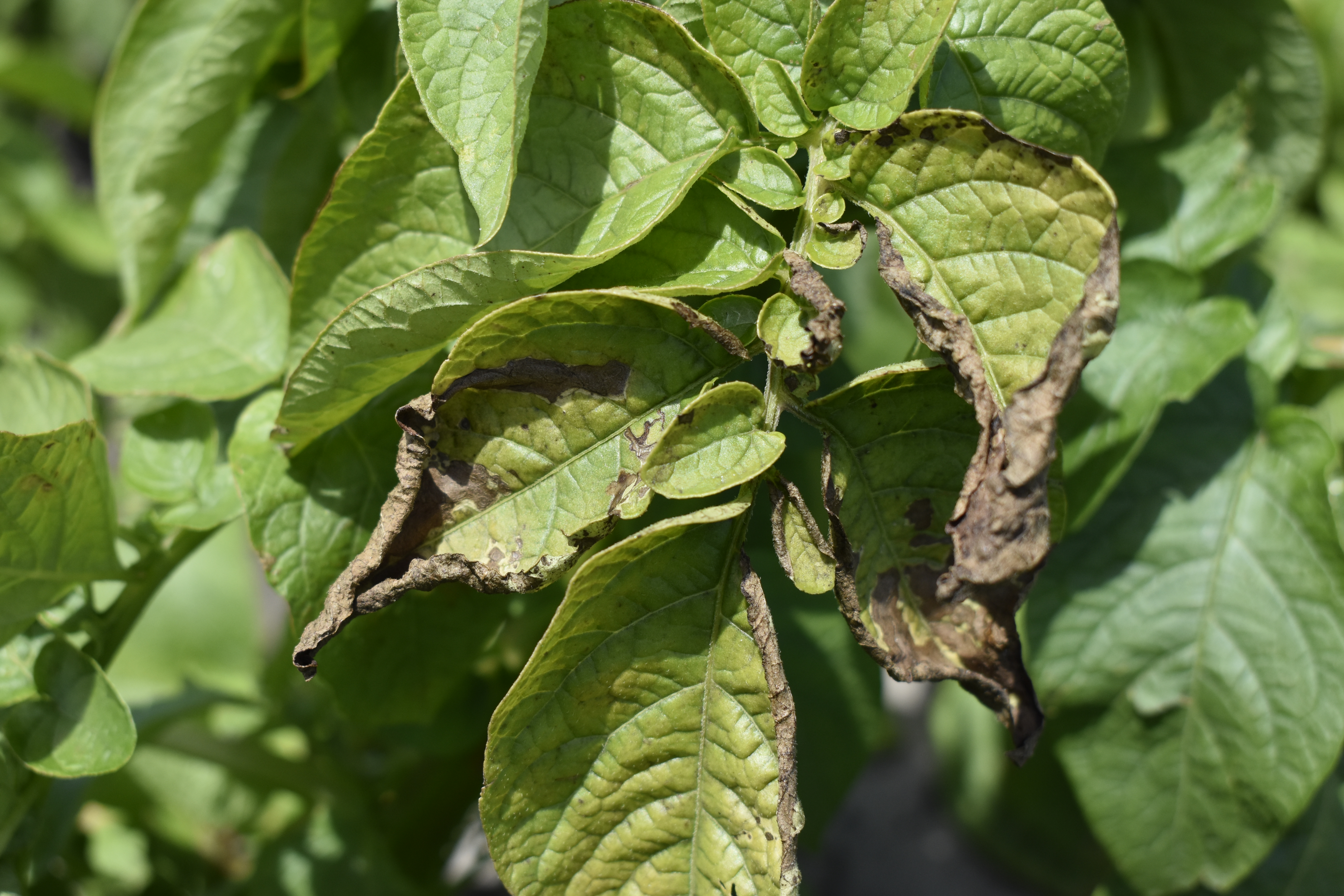
Potassium deficiency in potatoes at tuber maturity stage

In potatoes, tuber size is much reduced and crop yield is low. The leaves of the plant appear dull and are often blue-green in color with interveinal chlorosis. Leaves will also develop small, dark brown spots on the undersides and a bronzed appearance on the upper surfaces.

In brassicas, leaves are blue-green in color and may have a low degree of interveinal chlorosis. Scorching along the outside edges of leaves is common, and leaves are often tough in texture due to slow growth.

In tomatoes, the stems are woody and growth is slow. Leaves are blue-green in color, and the interveinal area often fades to a pale gray color. Leaves may also have a bronzed appearance and yellow and orange patches may develop on some of the leaflets. Fruits often ripen unevenly and sometimes have green patches near the stalks.

In apples, leaves are scorched around the edges, and interveinal chlorosis is common. Apple fruits often have a slightly acidic or woody taste.

In gooseberries, currants, and raspberries, dieback of shoots and branches is common and although the plant may produce many blossom buds in the early stages of deficiency, fruit yields turn out low and the fruits are of poor quality.

== Potassium deficiency and plant disease ==
For many species, potassium-deficient plants are more susceptible to frost damage and certain diseases than plants with adequate potassium levels. Increased disease resistance associated with adequate potassium levels indicates that potassium has roles in providing disease resistance, and increasing the potassium levels of deficient plants have been shown to decrease the intensity of many diseases. However, increasing potassium concentration above the optimal level does not provide greater disease resistance. In agriculture, some cultivars are more efficient at K uptake due to genetic variations, and often these plants have increased disease resistance. The mechanisms involved with increased host resistance and potassium include a decreased cell permeability and decreased susceptibility to tissue penetration. Silica, which is accumulated in greater quantities when adequate potassium is present, is incorporated into cell walls, strengthening the epidermal layer which functions as a physical barrier to pathogens. Potassium has also been implicated to have a role in the proper thickening of cell walls. To aid in potassium deficiency, farmers and many monoculture crop producers use vermiculite as a form of nutrition, soil aeration assistance as well as water retention to aid in nutrient poor environments.

== Plant adaptation to low-K environments ==
When potassium is readily available in the soil, a plant absorbs it through plasma membrane channels and high-affinity H+/K+ transporters and stores it in vacuoles. However, when K+ is present at very low concentrations, vacuolar K+ is used to feed the cytoplasm.

This process is initiated by a Ca2+-dependent signaling network which induces the release of K+ from the vacuole to the cytosol.

== Prevention and cure ==
The most widely used potassium fertilizer is potassium chloride (muriate of potash). Other inorganic potassium fertilizers include potassium nitrate, potassium sulfate, and monopotassium phosphate. Wood ash also has high potassium content but must be used cautiously due its effect on pH level. Adequate moisture is necessary for effective potassium uptake; low soil water reduces K uptake by plant roots. Liming acidic soils can increase potassium retention in some soils by reducing leaching; practices that increase soil organic matter can also increase potassium retention.
