= Anna Eliza Jenkins =

American mycologist and plant pathologist

Anna Eliza Jenkins (10 September 1886 – 26 November 1972) was an American mycologist. She specialized in phytopathology (plant diseases), particularly the fungi responsible for "spot anthracnoses", including Sphaceloma and Elsinoe.

== Early life ==
Born on a farm near Walton, New York, Jenkins attended a one-room country school before attending Walton High School, from which she graduated in 1907. Leaving home to study at Cornell University in Ithaca, New York, Jenkins was influenced and encouraged by the prominent mycologists Herbert Hice Whetzel and Louis Melville Massey. She earned her B.Sc. degree in 1911 and her master's degree the year following. A PhD followed later in 1927, after further study at George Washington University and graduate work at Cornell.

== Career ==
Jenkins started working with the United States Department of Agriculture (USDA) in 1912, and spent most of her career there. Her early research involved the taxonomy and life histories of new of little-known fungi of economic importance. Later, she studied fungi causing crop diseases, such as Sclerotinia on mulberry, Botryosphaeria on hemp, Elsinoe on lima beans, and pathogens of roses. Together with Agesilau Antonio Bitancourt she edited the exsiccata series Myriangiales selecti exsiccati.

== Works ==
- Jenkins A. E., Horsfall J. G. (1929). "A Comparison of Two Species of Plectodiscella". Mycologia. 21 (1): 44–51. doi:10.2307/3753857. JSTOR 3753857.
- Jenkins, Anna Eliza. "Insects as possible Carriers of the Citrus-scab Fungus." Phytopathology 20, no. 4 (1930).
- Jenkins, Anna Eliza. Transfer of Diaporthe umbrina to the genus Cryptosporella. 1935.
- Massey, Louis Melville, and Anna Eliza Jenkins. "Scab of violet caused by Sphaceloma." (1935).
- Jenkins A. E., Bitancourt A. A. (1941). "Revised Descriptions of the Genera Elsinoë and Sphaceloma". Mycologia. 33 (3): 338–40. doi:10.2307/3754772. JSTOR 3754772.

== Awards, honors, and memberships ==
Jenkins became a corresponding member of the Brazilian Academy of Sciences in 1956. She was awarded the Medal of Merit of Dom João VI in 1959. Fungal taxa named in her honor include Stilbocrea jenkiana, Sphaceloma annajenkinsii, and Annajenkinsia.

== See also ==
- List of mycologists
