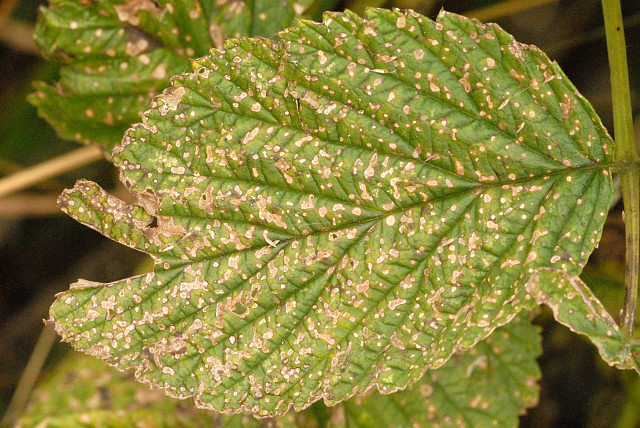
- Elsinoë veneta

Scientific classification
- Kingdom: Fungi
- Division: Ascomycota
- Class: Dothideomycetes
- Order: Myriangiales
- Family: Elsinoaceae; Höhn. ex Sacc. & Trotter, 1913

Genera
- Beelia; Butleria (fungus); Elsinoë; Hemimyriangium; Hyalotheles; Micularia; Molleriella; Saccardinula; Sphaceloma; Stephanotheca; Uleomycina; Xenodium

= Elsinoaceae =

Family of fungi

Elsinoaceae is a family of sac fungi, widely distributed in the tropics. A poorly known family, it includes some species that been identified as economically significant plant pathogens, in particular of citrus.
