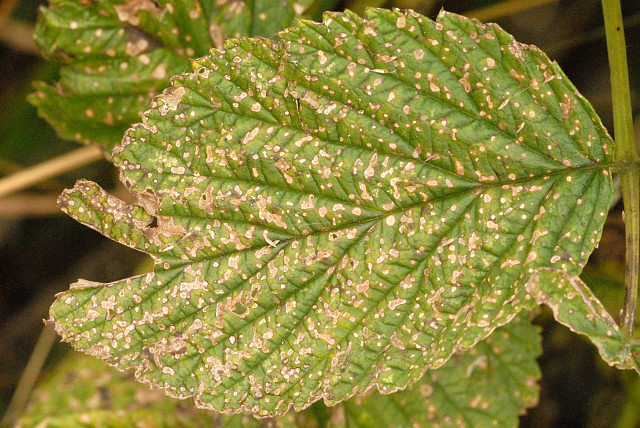
- Elsinoë veneta found in Commanster, Belgium

Scientific classification
- Domain: Eukaryota
- Kingdom: Fungi
- Division: Ascomycota
- Class: Dothideomycetes
- Subclass: Dothideomycetidae
- Order: Myriangiales; Starbäck, 1899

Families
- Elsinoaceae; Myriangiaceae

= Myriangiales =

Order of fungi

Myriangiales is an order of sac fungi, consisting of mostly plant pathogens.
