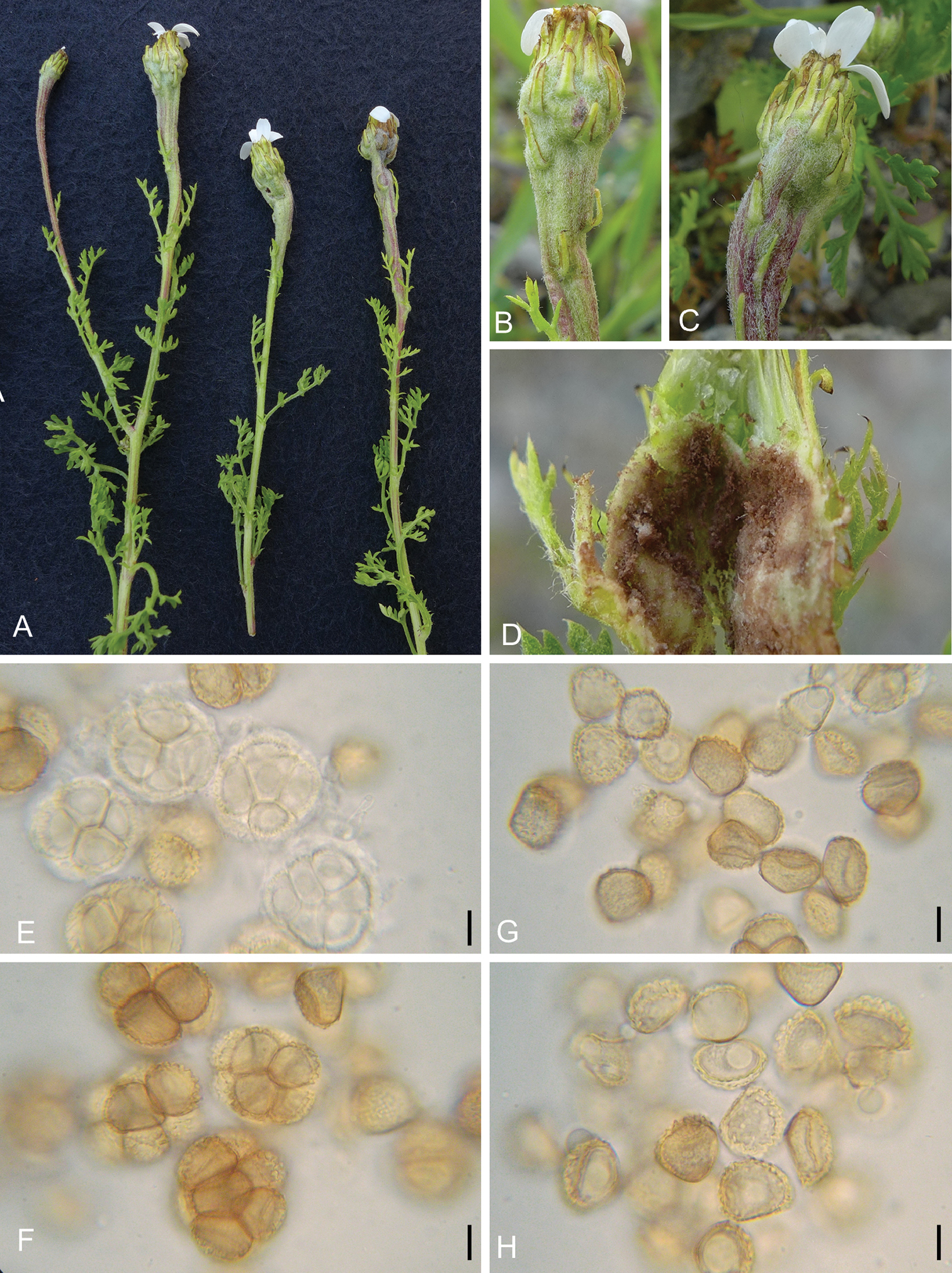
- Thecaphora anthemidis

Scientific classification
- Kingdom: Fungi
- Division: Basidiomycota
- Class: Ustilaginomycetes
- Order: Urocystidales
- Family: Glomosporiaceae
- Genus: Thecaphora; Fingerh. (1836)

Type species
- Thecaphora hyalina Fingerh. (1836)

Synonyms
- Angiosorus Thirum. & M.J.O'Brien (1974); Glomosporium Kochman (1939); Kochmania Piatek (2005); Poikilosporium Dietel (1897); Sorosporium F.Rudolphi (1829); Tothiella Vánky (1999)

= Thecaphora =

Genus of fungi

Thecaphora was also proposed for the order of cnidarians usually known as Leptomedusae.

Thecaphora is a genus of basidiomycote fungi which contains several species of plant pathogens. The widespread genus contained about 57 species in 2008. and held 61 species in 2020.

In 2008, genus Glomosporium and Kochmania were declared synonyms of Thecaphora. Also Sorosporium mohgaoense Chitaley & Yawale became Thecaphora mohgaoensis (Chitaley & Yawale) R.K. Saxena, Wijayaw., D.Q. Dai, K.D. Hyde & P.M. Kirk.

The genus Thecaphora contains plant-parasitic microfungi infecting hosts belonging to a range of dicotyledonous families. The species and their current nomenclature were summarised by Vánky et al. (2008), and Vánky (2012). Recently, three new species were described in Crous et al. (2018), Kruse et al. (2018), and Piątek et al. (2021). Thecaphora species are characterised by having spores in balls (or rarely single), generally without sterile cells, and infections are found in a range of different organs of their host plants.

== Hosts ==
Thecaphora solani (Thirum & M.J. O'Brien) Mordue 1988 (also called potato smut), is a smut fungus attacking tubers and underground stems of Solanum species, including potato Solanum tuberosum and also tomato Solanum lycopersicum and nearby native weed Datura stramonium (Mordue, 1988). in the Andean region of South America. It is not restricted to the higher, cooler elevations, but it has also been a problem in coastal Peru (Bazan de Segura 1960; Zachmann and Baumann, 1975), and also occurs in Mexico. The fungus can be transported within infected tubers and other planting material and also on their surfaces if they become contaminated with the spores. The fungus also can survive in the soil and therefore is difficult to eradicate.

Thecaphora melandrii (Syd.) Vánky & M.Lutz was found to infect species in the Caryophyllaceae family, forming sori with spore balls in the floral organs. This included Silene latifolia Poir., Silene nutansa L., Silene vulgarisa (Moench) Garcke and Stellaria gramineaa L. It was found in Britain on Silene uniflora Roth. Thecaphora schwarzmaniana was found on Rheum ribes in Iran and Turkey. Thecaphora anthemidis was found on species of Anthemis (Asteraceae family). Thecaphora dahuangis causes leaf smut disease in Rheum palmatum (or dahuang), a folk medicinal plant in China.

== Species ==
As accepted by Species Fungorum;

- Thecaphora affinis W.G. Schneid. (1874)
- Thecaphora alsinearum (Cif.) Vánky & M. Lutz (2007)
- Thecaphora amaranthicola M. Piepenbr. (2001)
- Thecaphora ambrosiae Vánky (1996)
- Thecaphora androsaces (P. Karst.) Gutner (1941)
- Thecaphora androsacina Vánky (1982)
- Thecaphora anthemidis J. Kruse, V. Kumm. & Thines (2018)
- Thecaphora arnicae Vánky (2009)
- Thecaphora australiensis Stajsic, Y.P. Tan & R.G. Shivas (2018)
- Thecaphora burkartii J.C. Lindq. (1953)
- Thecaphora californica (Harkn.) G.P. Clinton (1902)
- Thecaphora capensis Roets & L.L. Dreyer (2008)
- Thecaphora capsularum (Fr.) Tul. (1866)
- Thecaphora cerastii M. Lutz & Vánky (2007)
- Thecaphora cuneata (Schofield) G.P. Clinton (1902)
- Thecaphora dahuangis M. Piątek, M. Lutz, Yan Wang, S.R. Wang & R. Kellner (2021)
- Thecaphora deformans (Durieu & Mont. (1847)
- Thecaphora denticulata Durán (1982)
- Thecaphora desmodii (Peck) Woronin (1888)
- Thecaphora frezzii Carranza and Lindquist (1962)
- Thecaphora haumanii Speg. (1925)
- Thecaphora hedysari Vánky (1991)
- Thecaphora heliopsidis Durán (1982)
- Thecaphora hennenii Durán (1982)
- Thecaphora hieronymi J. Schröt. (1896)
- Thecaphora hosackiae Vánky (2008)
- Thecaphora iresines (J.A. Elliott) H.S. Jacks. (1920)
- Thecaphora italica M. Lutz & Vánky (2007)
- Thecaphora lagenophorae (McAlpine) McAlpine (1910)
- Thecaphora lathyri (J.G.Kühn (1873)
- Thecaphora lithospermi Vánky & Nannf. (1975)
- Thecaphora loti Mayor (1949)
- Thecaphora lupini Mayor (1949)
- Thecaphora maireanae R.G. Shivas & Vánky (2003)
- Thecaphora melampodii Durán (1982)
- Thecaphora melandrii (Syd.) Vánky & M. Lutz (2007)
- Thecaphora mexicana Ellis & Everh. ex G.P. Clinton (1902)
- Thecaphora mohgaoensis (Chitaley & Yawale) R.K. Saxena, Wijayaw., D.Q. Dai, K.D. Hyde & P.M. Kirk (2021)
- Thecaphora molluginis Săvul. (1955)
- Thecaphora neomexicana Durán (1982)
- Thecaphora oberwinkleri Vánky (1988)
- Thecaphora oxalidis (Ellis & Tracy) M. Lutz, R. Bauer & Piatek (2008)
- Thecaphora oxytropis S.R. Wang (2006)
- Thecaphora pakistanica Vánky, S.H. Iqbal & Khalid (2007)
- Thecaphora piluliformis Berk. & M.A. Curtis (1874)
- Thecaphora pimpinellae Juel (1891)
- Thecaphora polymniae Vánky & Pardo-Card. (1996)
- Thecaphora pulcherrima Durán (1971)
- Thecaphora pustulata G.P. Clinton (1921)
- Thecaphora ruppiae Setch. (1924)
- Thecaphora saponariae (F. Rudolphi) Vánky (1998)
- Thecaphora schwarzmaniana Byzova (1960)
- Thecaphora seminis-convolvuli (Desm. ex Duby) Liro (1935)
- Thecaphora smallanthi M. Piepenbr., P. Hanson & J. Carranza (2001)
- Thecaphora solani Barrus (1944)
- Thecaphora solidaginis (Ellis & Everh.) Vánky (2009)
- Thecaphora sphaerophysae Z.Y. Zhao & Y.W. Xi (1989)
- Thecaphora spilanthis F.O. Freire & Vánky (1996)
- Thecaphora stajsicii J. Kruse, R.G. Shivas & McTaggart (2021)
- Thecaphora thlaspeos (Beck) Vánky (2004)
- Thecaphora thornberi Griffiths (1904)
- Thecaphora trailii ((Cooke) (1883)
- Thecaphora trigonellae Schwarzman (1960)
- Thecaphora tunicata G.P. Clinton (1904)
- Thecaphora ulicis Vánky (2008)
- Thecaphora viciae Bubák (1916)
- Thecaphora viciae-amoenae Y. Harada (1983)

Former species;

- T. africana H. Scholz (1981) = Tolyposporium kuwanoanum, Anthracoideaceae
- T. amaranthi (Hirschh.) Vánky (1994) = Glomosporium amaranthi, Glomosporiaceae
- T. anemarrhenae C.H. Chow & Chi C. Chang (1974) = Floromyces anemarrhenae, Floromycetaceae
- T. apicis Savile (1953) = Moreaua apicis, Anthracoideaceae
- T. astragali (Peck) Woronin (1888) = Thecaphora affinis
- T. aterrima Tul. & C. Tul. (1847) = Moreaua aterrima, Anthracoideaceae
- T. bulbinellae P.H.B. Talbot (1958) = Urocystis bulbinellae, Urocystidaceae
- T. carcinodes Berk. & M.A. Curtis (1874) = Urocystis carcinodes, Urocystidaceae
- T. convolvuli Desm. ex Rostr. (1890) = Thecaphora capsularum
- T. convolvuli Schilb. (1895) = Thecaphora capsularum
- T. dactylidis Pass. (1877) = Jamesdicksonia dactylidis, Georgefischeriaceae
- T. decaisneana Boud. (1886) = Schroeteria decaisneana, Ascomycota
- T. delastrina Tul. & C. Tul. (1847) = Schroeteria delastrina, Ascomycota
- T. globuligera Berk. & Broome (1879) = Tolyposporium globuligerum, Anthracoideaceae
- T. herteriana Cif. (1932) = Urocystis herteriana, Urocystidaceae
- T. hyalina Fingerh. (1836) = Thecaphora capsularum
- T. inquinans Berk. & Broome (1873) = Prosthecium inquinans, Melanconidaceae
- T. jubilei Jacz. (1941) = Thecaphora androsaces
- T. kochiana (Gäum.) Thirum. & Neerg. (1978) = Moreaua kochiana, Anthracoideaceae
- T. lepidospermatis (McAlpine) Thirum. & Neerg. (1978) = Moreaua lepidospermatis, Anthracoideaceae
- T. leptideum (Syd. & P. Syd.) Zundel (1937) = Glomosporium leptideum, Glomosporiaceae
- T. leptocarpi Berk. (1881) = Restiosporium leptocarpi, Websdaneaceae
- T. littoralis (G. Cunn.) Thirum. & Neerg. (1978) = Moreaua littoralis, Anthracoideaceae
- T. mauritiana (Syd.) L. Ling (1950) = Moreaua mauritiana, Anthracoideaceae
- T. mauritianum (Syd.) L. Ling (1950) = Moreaua mauritiana, Anthracoideaceae
- T. melanogramma (DC.) Lév. (1847) = Schizonella melanogramma, Anthracoideaceae
- T. muelleriana (Thüm.) Thirum. & Neerg. (1978) = Moreaua muelleriana, Anthracoideaceae
- T. rhynchosporae G.W. Fisch. (1952) = Moreaua fischeri, Anthracoideaceae
- T. rodwayi (McAlpine) Thirum. & Neerg. (1978) = Moreaua rodwayi, Anthracoideaceae
