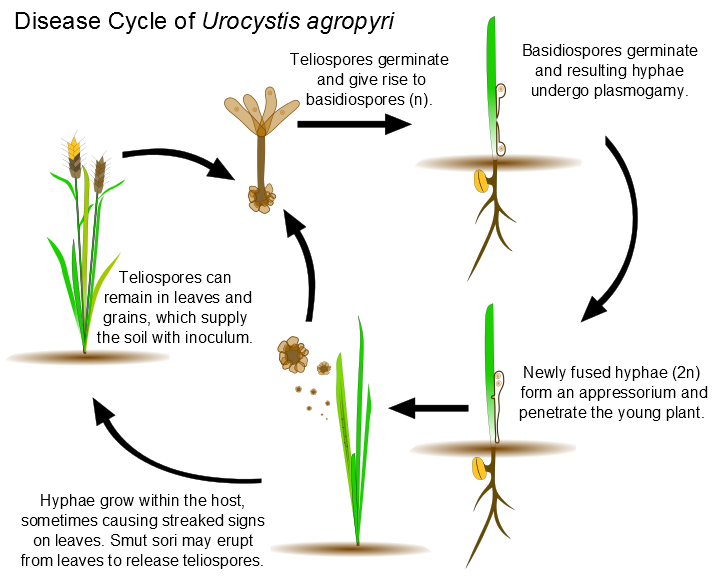
- Flag smut disease cycle

Scientific classification
- Domain: Eukaryota
- Kingdom: Fungi
- Division: Basidiomycota
- Class: Ustilaginomycetes
- Order: Urocystidales
- Family: Urocystidiaceae
- Genus: Urocystis
- Species: U. agropyri

Binomial name
- Urocystis agropyri (Preuss) A.A. Fisch. Waldh., (1867)

Synonyms
- Polycystis agropyri (Preuss) J. Schröt. (1877); Tuburcinia agropyri (Preuss) Liro, (1922); Tuburcinia occulta var. agropyri (Preuss) Cif., (1963); Tuburcinia tritici (Körn.) Liro, (1922); Uredo agropyri Preuss, (1848)

= Urocystis agropyri =

Urocystis agropyri (flag smut)

Species of fungus

Urocystis agropyri is a fungal plant pathogen that causes flag smut on wheat.

== Biology ==
The flag smut fungus, U. agropyri, is a basidiomycete. It produces basidiospores and teliospores. This pathogen is found globally, but is most problematic in Australia and India.

=== Hosts ===
Urocystis agropyri infects wheat (Triticum aestivum L.), among other grass species. Relatives of U. agropyri infect other grasses and are frequently identified as the causal organism of flag smut on wheat, but there is debate still as to whether they are the same organism or different strains.

=== Symptoms ===
Flag smut is a systemic disease that starts in young tissues. Early symptoms include "leprous" spots and bending or twisting of coleoptiles. Older plant leaves have white striations that eventually turn silvery gray, which is evidence of the pathogen's impending sporulation. Additionally, infected plants may have stunted growth, increased leaf production, sterile seeds, and failure to produce heads or have successful leaf expansion.

=== Diagnosis ===
Leaves will appear streaked with stripes, which are white, gray or black. The leaf discoloration is due to fungal structures called sori, which are clusters of spore-bearing structures. During sporulation, sori burst through leaves releasing teliospores and cause leaves to appear tattered. These spores are reddish brown, smoothly rounded, and they tend to be in clumps of 5-6 with sterile cells around them. The clumped spores are often referred to as "spore balls" and measure about 20-50 microns. Large quantities of U. agropyri spores look like brown or black dust.

== Disease cycle ==
Urocystis agropyri produces teliospores, which may be wind dispersed or distributed through soils via machinery or animals. In soil, a dikaryotic teliospore germinates, meiosis occurs, then mitosis, and this gives rise to up to four basidiospores, each containing a single nucleus. Basidiospores germinate on seedlings, and each hypha undergoes plasmogamy with a compatible hypha. In this, one nucleus transfers to the other hypha, reestablishing the dikaryotic state of the fungus. The hyphae form appressoria which penetrate the coleoptile of an emerging seeds' shoot through the epidermal tissue, then hyphae grow between vascular bundles of the leaves. Some hyphal cells give rise to smut sori, bearing teliospores, which emerge through the leaf tissue for wind dispersal. Teliospores come to rest in soils, and when conditions are right, they give rise to more basidiospores, further spreading the infection. Alternatively, teliospores can form in seeds when the mycelia grows throughout the plant, in which case they germinate within the seed to give rise to new infection, again via basidiospore production. Teliospores overwinter in the soil, senescent plant tissues, and in seeds. These spores maintain germination viability for 3–7 years.

== Environmental conditions ==
This pathogen prefers arid summers, moderate temperatures, and mild winters. Flag smut fungi germinate in dry soils when the temperature ranges from 40-80 °F. Flag smut has been reported in Australia, the United States, Canada, South Africa, China, Japan, India, Egypt, and Pakistan. Cultivation practices that leave plant debris on soil surfaces enhances U. agropyri's success, as does sowing wheat in winter rather than spring. Mild winters improves the pathogen's ability to establish infections for seeds sown in autumn or winter; spring plantings give the fungus less opportunity to establish.

== Disease management ==
Generally, strategies to prevent flag smut include use of disease resistant cultivars, chemical seed treatments, and crop rotation to reduce amount of inocula present. Since U. agropyri spores germinate in dry soils, maintaining wetter soils helps to diminish their viability. Carboxin is a commonly used fungicide on seeds, which works well to prevent onset of disease. In addition to seed treatments, application of systemic fungicides early in the growing season and at low doses is effective at controlling the disease. Sowing seeds shallowly in soil also helps to reduce disease occurrence.

== Impact ==
=== Yield loss ===
Losses from flag smut are usually considered on a field by field basis. Fields planted with susceptible cultivars that happen to become infected will generally be total losses. Australia is among a handful of places that still suffer losses resulting from flag smut. Average losses in Australia are greater than AUS$50 million. Australia experienced the greatest loss known early in the 20th century due to susceptibility of popular wheat varieties and lack of fungicides at the time. In the 1960s, new varieties were planted, which supported a resurgence of disease. Occasionally, total crop losses still occur, but the typical loss range is 5-20%. Losses may be either direct or indirect, as affected plants may be more susceptible to other biotic or abiotic stresses. India reported losses from flag smut in the 1940s through the 1970s, and this averaged about 15,000 tons each year. India and the United States currently have low incidence of this disease due to deployment of resistant cultivars. The occurrence of the disease in the United States was limited to the Pacific Northwest and was the result of the introduction of susceptible cultivars in the mid-twentieth century.

=== Historical ===
Urocystis agropyri is a global problem in wheat-growing regions, especially where environmental conditions suit the fungus. Flag smut was first reported from Agropyron spp. in Europe in 1848, misattributed to Uredo agropyri. It was probably present in South Australia before 1868, known as "black rust", but is only definitely identified starting from that year. It was at first identified by Wolff 1873 as U. occulta, but spore morphology differentiated it in the opinion of Körnicke 1877. Later, other countries identified it as the pathogen that was introduced to world crops through trading of seeds and infected cultivars. The development of flag smut in Australia in the nineteenth century, followed by the United States in the twentieth century, is likely due to the spread and exchange of contaminated seeds. Quarantine regulations restricted the movement of infected seed, chaff, and farm machinery from endemic areas. They were first enacted in the USA in the twentieth century to effectively inhibit the spread of disease. Similar regulations were later adopted in Belgium, Germany, the Netherlands, the United Kingdom and many other countries. Flag smut is widespread across Australia and was particularly problematic in the 1920s until resistant cultivars were discovered and put into use. Between 1955 and 1971, flag smut damage and distribution increased in the Pacific Northwest of the United States when the use of several susceptible wheat cultivars was coupled with deep seeding in early autumn planting. Through use of resistant cultivars, the Pacific Northwest's flag smut issue no longer poses a significant threat to yields.
