= List of wild rice diseases =

This article is a list of diseases of cultivated wild rice (Zizania palustris).

Fungal Brown Spot is the only significant commercial disease of cultivated wild rice. It is found mostly in the cultivated wild rice fields of Minnesota.

== Bacterial diseases ==
Bacterial diseases
Bacterial brown spot	Pseudomonas syringae pv. syringae
Bacterial leaf streak	Xanthomonas campestris Pseudomonas coronafaciens pv. zizaniae

== Fungal diseases ==
Fungal diseases
Anthracnose	Colletotrichum sublineolum
Ergot	Claviceps zizaniae
Fungal brown spot	Bipolaris oryzae
Phytophthora crown and root rot	Phytophthora erythroseptica
Scab	Fusarium spp.
Spot blotch	Bipolaris sorokiniana
Stem rot	Sclerotium hydrophilum Sclerotium oryzae
Stem smut	Entyloma lineatum
Zonate eye spot	Drechslera gigantea

== Viral diseases ==
Viral diseases
Wheat streak mosaic	Wheat streak mosaic virus—wild rice
