= Jamesdicksonia =

Scientific classification
- Kingdom: Fungi
- Division: Basidiomycota
- Class: Exobasidiomycetes
- Order: Georgefischeriales
- Family: Georgefischeriaceae
- Genus: Jamesdicksonia; Thirum., Pavgi & Payak

Genus of fungi

Jamesdicksonia is a genus of fungi belonging to the family Georgefischeriaceae.

The genus was first described by Mandayani Jeersannidhi Thirumalachar, Pavgi and Payak in 1961.

The genus has cosmopolitan distribution.

Species:

- Jamesdicksonia dactylidis (Pass.) R.Bauer, Begerow, A.Nagler & Oberw.
