= Glomosporium leptideum =

Scientific classification
- Domain: Eukaryota
- Kingdom: Fungi
- Division: Basidiomycota
- Class: Ustilaginomycetes
- Order: Urocystidales
- Family: Glomosporiaceae
- Genus: Glomosporium
- Species: G. leptideum

Binomial name
- Glomosporium leptideum (Syd. & P.Syd.) Kochman

Species of fungus

Glomosporium leptideum is a species of fungus belonging to the family Glomosporiaceae.

It is native to Europe and Australia.
