= Thecaphora oxalidis =

Scientific classification
- Domain: Eukaryota
- Kingdom: Fungi
- Division: Basidiomycota
- Class: Ustilaginomycetes
- Order: Urocystidales
- Family: Glomosporiaceae
- Genus: Thecaphora
- Species: T. oxalidis

Binomial name
- Thecaphora oxalidis (Ellis & Tracy) M. Lutz, R. Bauer & Piatek, 2008

Species of fungus

Thecaphora oxalidis is a species of fungus belonging to the family Glomosporiaceae.

Synonym:

- Kochmania oxalidis (Ellis & Tracy) Piatek, 2005
