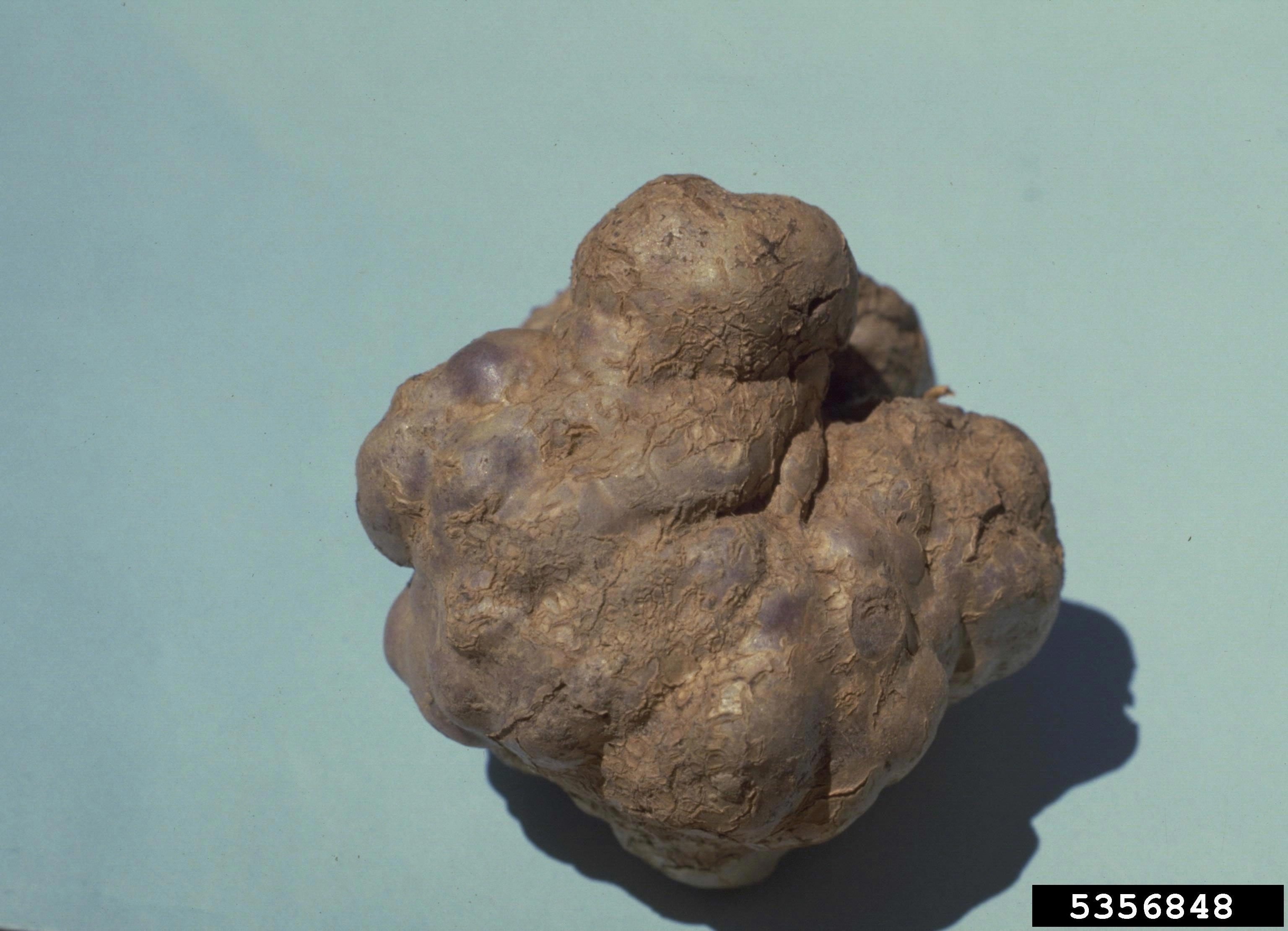

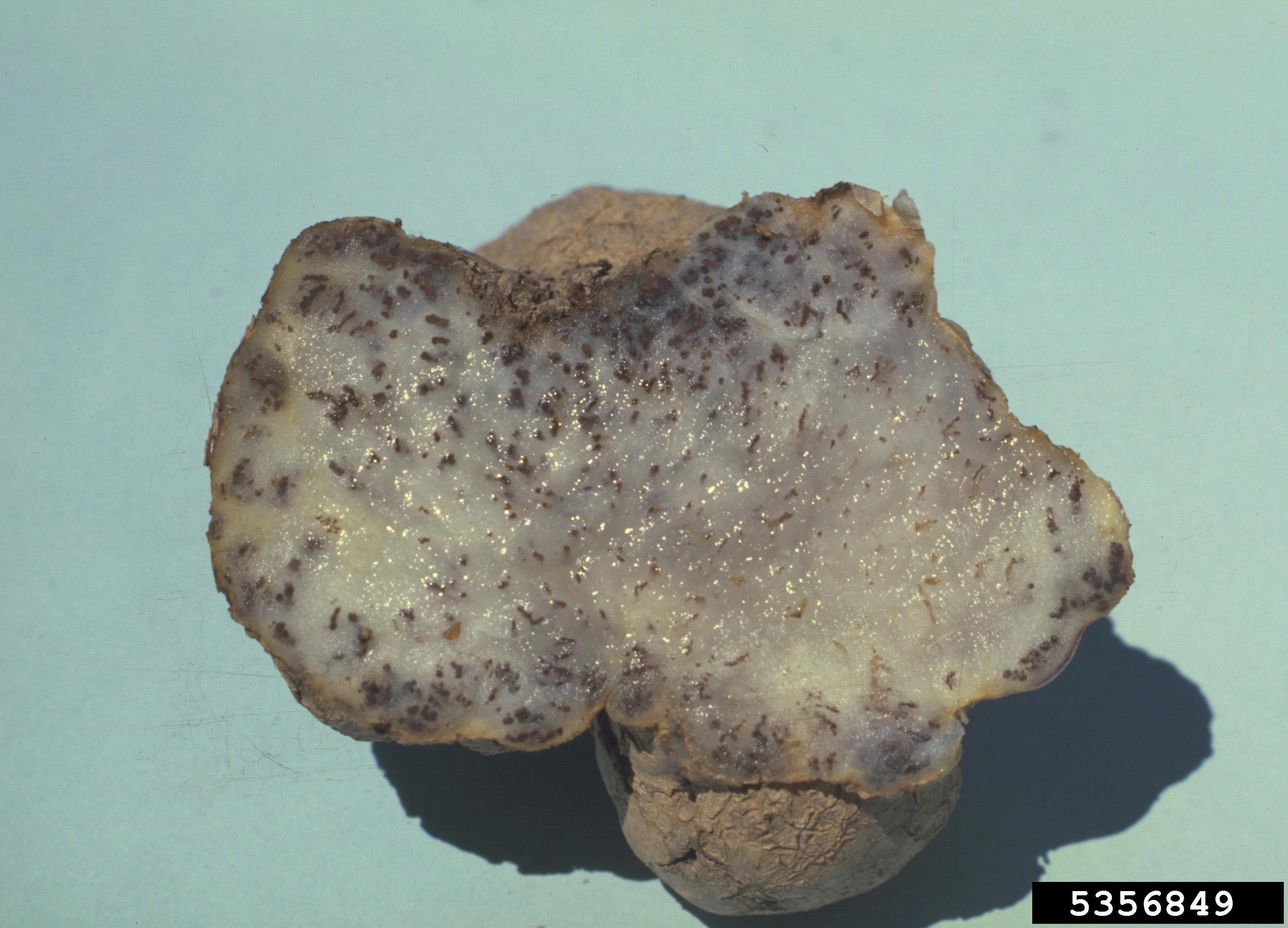

Scientific classification
- Kingdom: Fungi
- Division: Basidiomycota
- Class: Ustilaginomycetes
- Order: Urocystidales
- Family: Glomosporiaceae
- Genus: Thecaphora
- Species: T. solani

Binomial name
- Thecaphora solani Barrus, (1944)

Synonyms
- Angiosorus solani Thirum. & M.J. O'Brien, (1974); Thecaphora solani (Thirum. & M.J. O'Brien) Mordue, (1988); Thecaphora solani (Thirum. & M.J. O'Brien) Vánky, (1988)

= Thecaphora solani =

Species of fungus

Thecaphora solani, also known as potato smut, is a fungal plant pathogen. It affects plants, primarily potatoes, in the Andean part of South America. This disease of potatoes has caused reports of crop losses of up to 80 percent in South America.

== Synonyms ==
- Angiosorus solani Thirum. & M.J. O'Brien, (1974),
- Thecaphora solani (Thirum. & M.J. O'Brien) Mordue, (1988),
- Thecaphora solani (Thirum. & M.J. O'Brien) Vánky, (1988).
