= Urocystis tritici =

Scientific classification
- Domain: Eukaryota
- Kingdom: Fungi
- Division: Basidiomycota
- Class: Ustilaginomycetes
- Order: Urocystidales
- Family: Urocystidiaceae
- Genus: Urocystis
- Species: U. tritici

Binomial name
- Urocystis tritici Körn., (1877)

Synonyms
- Tuburcinia tritici (Körn.) Liro, Ann. Univ., fenn. Aboënsis, Ser. A 1(no. 1): 17 (1922)

Species of fungus

Urocystis tritici is a fungal plant pathogen in the family Urocystidiaceae.

It was originally found on the leaves, sheaths and stalks of Triticum vulgare (common wheat) in Australia.
