= Jamesdicksonia dactylidis =

Scientific classification
- Domain: Eukaryota
- Kingdom: Fungi
- Division: Basidiomycota
- Class: Exobasidiomycetes
- Order: Georgefischeriales
- Family: Georgefischeriaceae
- Genus: Jamesdicksonia
- Species: J. dactylidis

Binomial name
- Jamesdicksonia dactylidis (Pass.) R.Bauer, Begerow, A.Nagler & Oberw.

Synonyms
- List: Entyloma anadelphiae Vienn.-Bourg., Bull. Soc. bot. Fr. 104: 273 (1957); Entyloma crastophilum Sacc., Michelia 1(no. 5): 540 (1879); Entyloma dactylidis (Pass.) Cif., Boll. Soc. bot. ital., 1924 2: 55 (1924); Entyloma holci Liro, Mycoth. fenn., Fasc. 16: 112 (1939); Entyloma speciosum var. anadelphiae (Vienn.-Bourg.) Cif., Quad. Ist. Bot. Univ. Pavia 27: 148 (1963); Entyloma speciosum var. dactylidis (Pass.) Cif., Quad. Ist. Bot. Univ. Pavia 27: 148 (1963); Entylomella crastophila Cif., Omagiu lui Traian Savulescu: 176 (1959); Jamesdicksonia anadelphiae (Vienn.-Bourg.) Piątek, Phytotaxa 192(1): 45 (2014); Melanotaenium dactylidis (Pass.) Denchev, Mycotaxon 55: 252 (1995); Thecaphora dactylidis Pass., Nuovo G. bot. ital. 9: 238 (1877)

Species of fungus

Jamesdicksonia dactylidis is a species of fungus belonging to the family Georgefischeriaceae.

It was originally published by Pass. as Thecaphora dactylidis in 1877, before being renamed as Jamesdicksonia dactylidis in 2001.

It has a cosmopolitan distribution.
