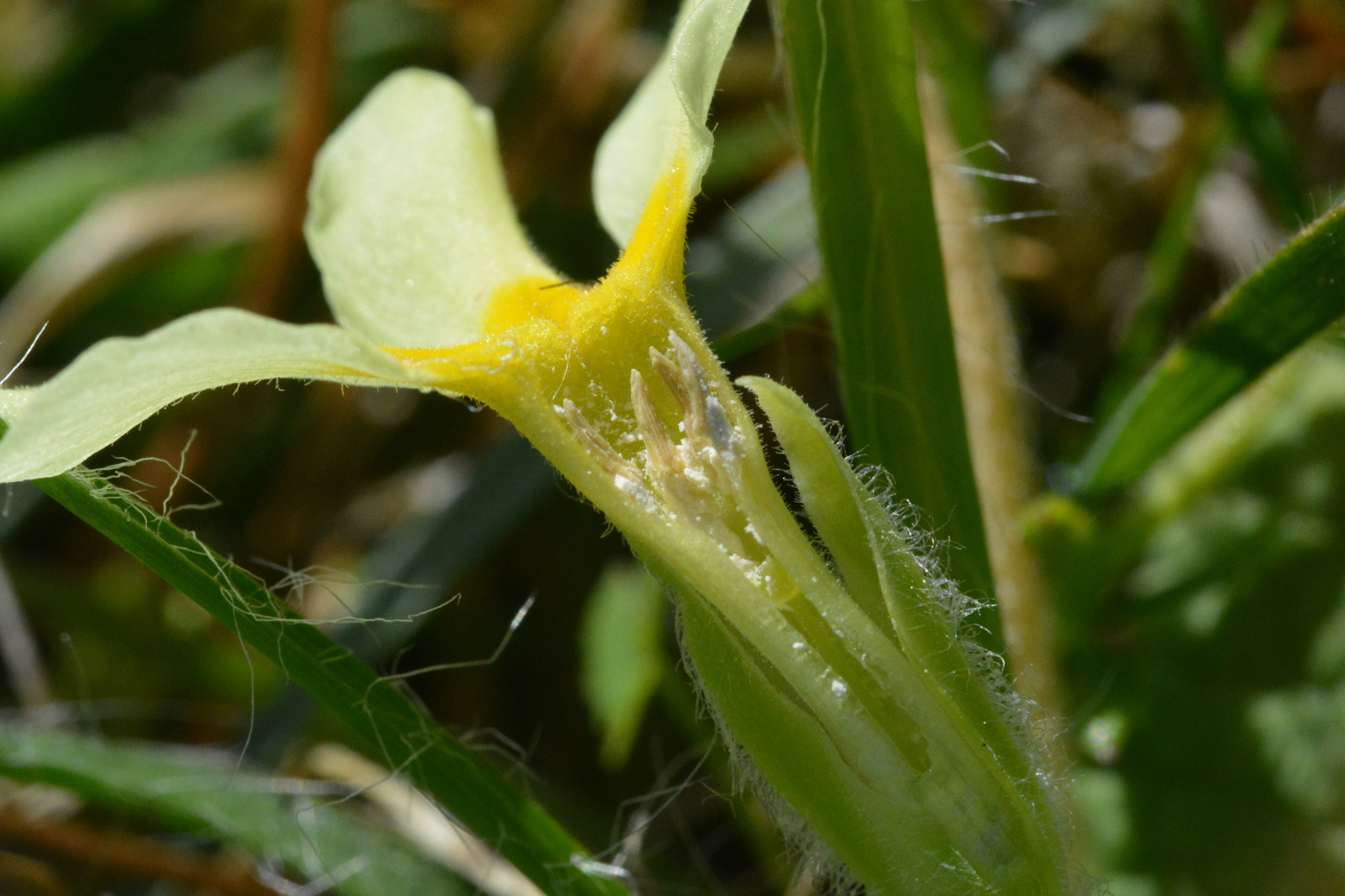
- Conidia are visible as a white powder around the anthers of a dissected flower of Primula vulgaris.

Scientific classification
- Kingdom: Fungi
- Division: Basidiomycota
- Class: Ustilaginomycetes
- Order: Urocystidales
- Family: Urocystidiaceae
- Genus: Urocystis
- Species: U. primulae

Binomial name
- Urocystis primulae (Rostrup) Vánky, 1985

Synonyms
- Ginanniella primulae (Rostrup) Ciferri, 1938

= Urocystis primulae =

Species of fungus

Urocystis primulae is a fungal plant pathogen that infects several species of Primula.

The fungus affects the flowers of the plant, turning the contents of the ovary into a mass of spore balls: clumps of ustilospores wrapped in a layer of sterile cells. It also produces white, powdery conidia in the anthers.

== Gallery ==
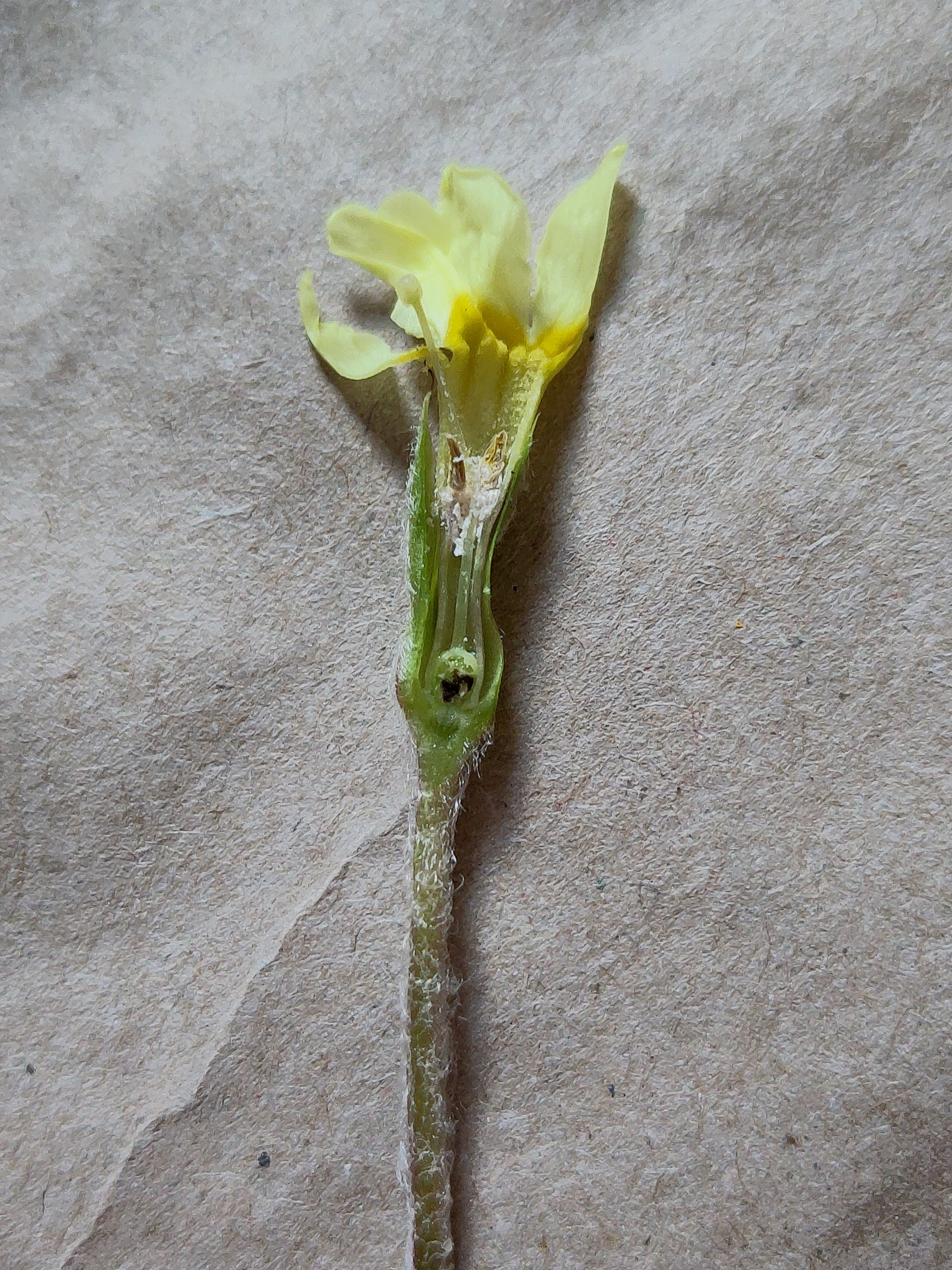
A dissected flower of Primula vulgaris infected with Urocystis primulae. Conidia are visible as a white powder around the anthers and ustilospores as a blackish brown mass in the ovary.

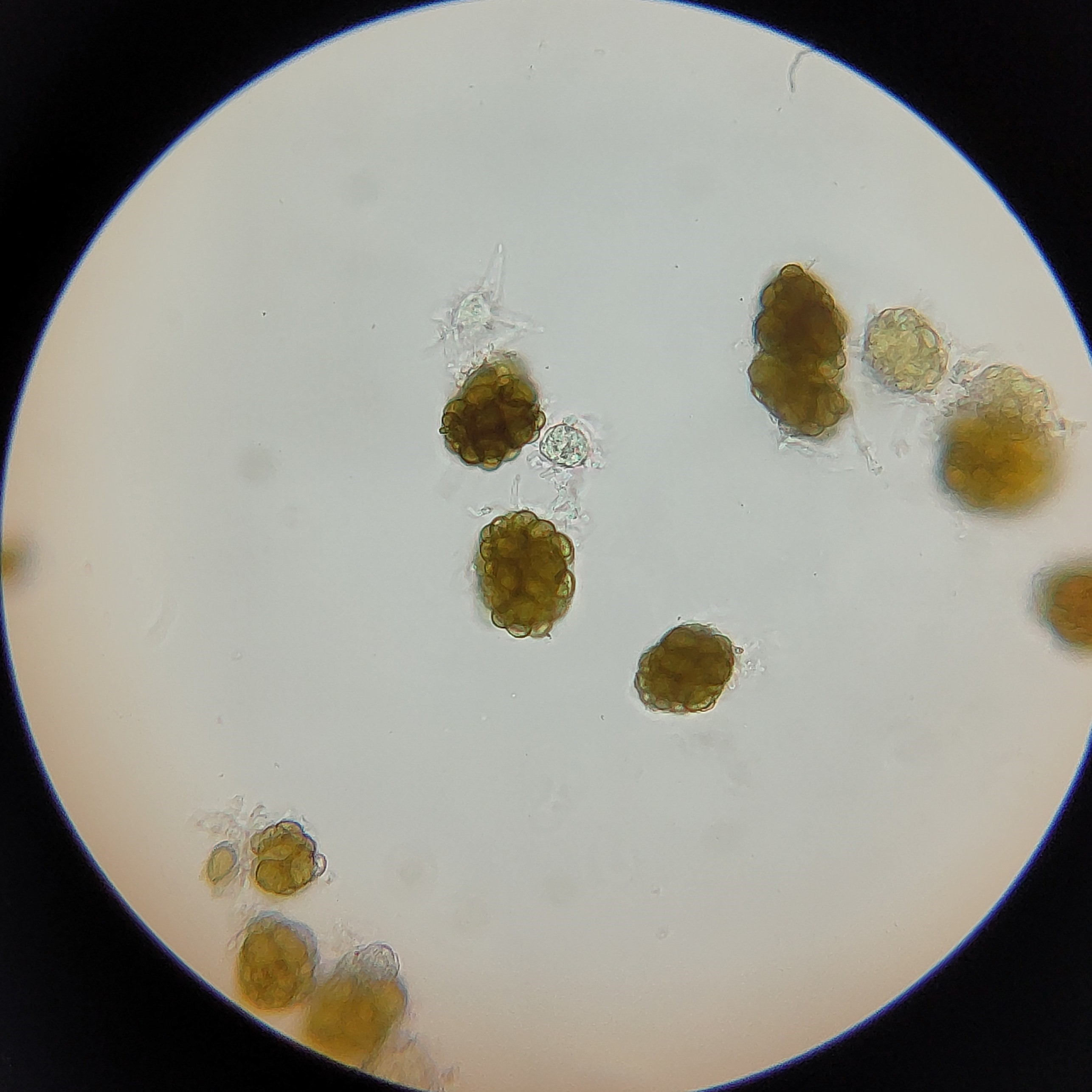
Spore balls of Urocystis primulae under the microscope. These are the ustilospores visible in the ovary in the image above.

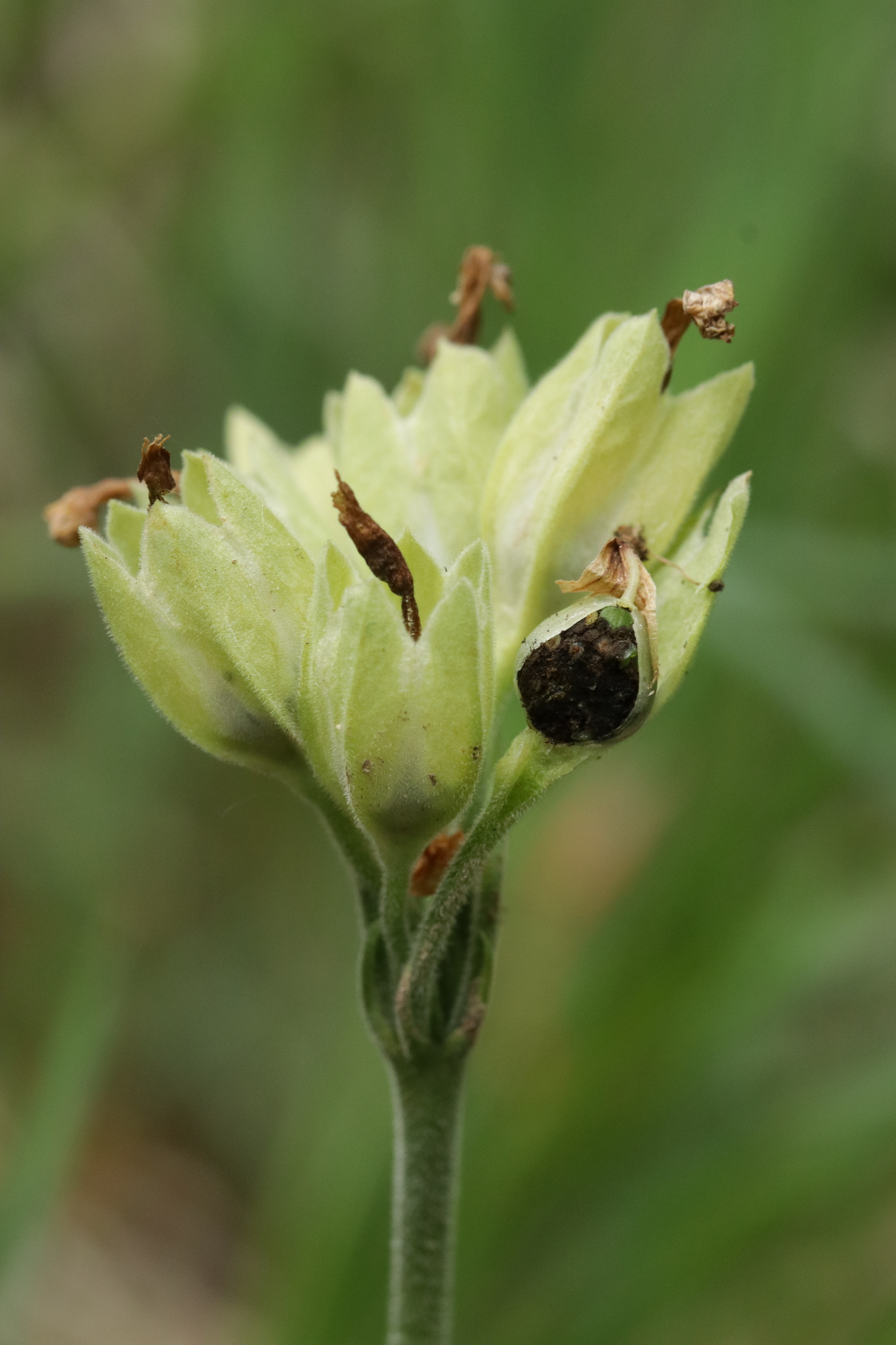
Ustilospores of Urocystis primulae in the fruit of Primula veris.

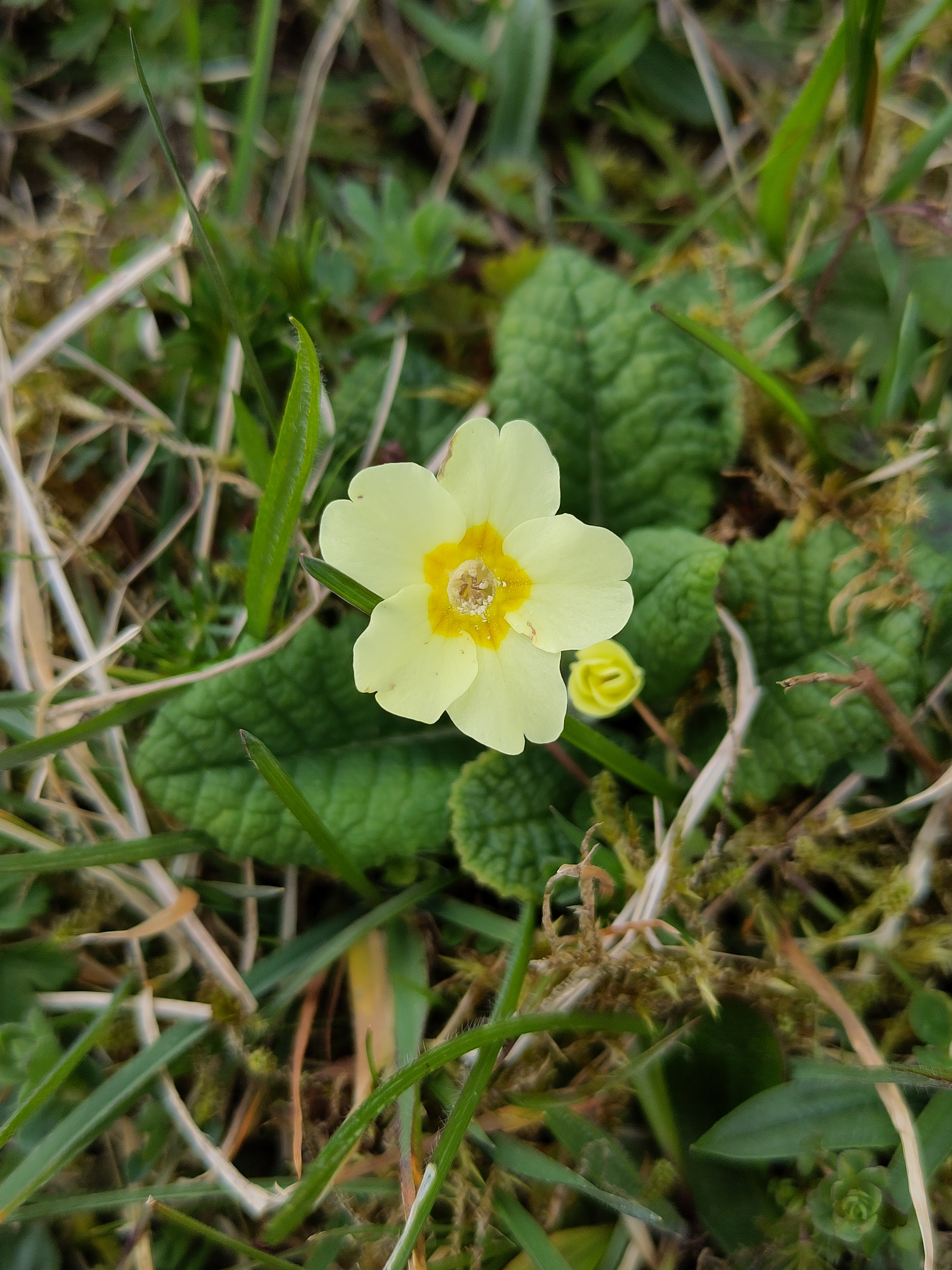
Conidia are visible in a thrum-eyed flower of Primula vulgaris.
