= Urocystis alopecuri =

Scientific classification
- Domain: Eukaryota
- Kingdom: Fungi
- Division: Basidiomycota
- Class: Ustilaginomycetes
- Order: Urocystidales
- Family: Urocystidiaceae
- Genus: Urocystis
- Species: U. alopecuri

Binomial name
- Urocystis alopecuri A.B.Frank, (1880)

Synonyms
- Tuburcinia alopecuri (A.B. Frank) Liro, Ann. Univ., fenn. Aboënsis, Ser. A 1(no. 1): 24 (1922); Tuburcinia occulta var. alopecuri (A.B. Frank) Cif., Quad. Ist. Bot. Univ. Pavia 27: 317 (1963)

Species of fungus

Urocystis alopecuri is a fungal plant pathogen in the family Urocystidiaceae. Known as 'Foxtail Smut'.

It is found on Alopecurus species; such as Alopecurus aequalis, Alopecurus arundinaceus, Alopecurus geniculatus, Alopecurus myosuroides and Alopecurus pratensis in Europe.
