= Thecaphora frezzii =

Scientific classification
- Kingdom: Fungi
- Division: Basidiomycota
- Class: Ustilaginomycetes
- Order: Urocystidales
- Family: Glomosporiaceae
- Genus: Thecaphora
- Species: T. frezzii

Binomial name
- Thecaphora frezzii J.M. Carranza and J.C. Lindquist (1962)

Species of fungus

Thecaphora frezzii, commonly referred to as peanut smut, is a species of smut fungus of the genus Thecaphora and the family Glomosporiaceae. It is a basidiomycete fungus that infects peanut plants (Arachis hypogaea). It is currently only found in South America, more specifically in Argentinian peanut farms.

== Taxonomy ==
Thecaphora frezzii was described by J.M. Carranza and J.C. Lindquist in 1962. It was originally spelled as "frezii" but was later changed to "frezzii."

== Description ==
=== Physical description ===
An infected host's pod will have hypertrophic cells in the form of galls and a spongy consistency. The cells of the grains inside the pods are destroyed and replaced by reddish-brown teliospores. Something characteristic of all Thecaphora species is that they all produce sori in the host plant. For T. frezzii, these sori are produced on the peanut seeds and are composed of 1 to 10 tightly bound spores.

=== Lifecycle ===
Thecophora frezzii is a biotrophic obligate parasite of peanut plants. It is monocyclic, so an infection cycle occurs once per growing season. The fungus causes a partial or total destruction of the peanut fruit. Throughout the biological cycle of the fungus, there are three main structures: teliospores, basidiospores, and hyphae.

==== Teliospores ====
The teliospores are present during the state of dormancy and act as resistance structures. They have thick walls allowing the fungus to survive in the soil and crop residue until germination. Teliospores germinate in response to the plant root exudates, therefore infection occurs once the peanut peg enters the soil. Teliospores disperse most commonly via wind or machinery when peanuts are harvested and remain dormant until germination is triggered.

==== Basidiospores ====
Following the germination of teliospores, the probasidum forms. The probasidium has two haploid nuclei which fuse to form a diploid nucleus. From this nucleus, the basidium arises, which forms basidiospores via meiosis. During basidiospore germination, compatible haploid germ tubes fuse.

==== Hyphal stage ====
Germination of the basidiospores leads to the formation of a dikaryotic mycelium, which is the infection structure of Thecaphora frezzii. The mycelium infects the host by penetrating the gynophore. It uses effectors to suppress the host's immune responses to insure successful penetration and infection.

=== Habitat and range ===
Thecaphora frezzii is only found in South America. Cases of peanut smut on domesticated peanuts are only reported in Argentina, while wild peanuts were found to be infected in other parts of the continent. The fungus never breaches to the surface and remains in humid soils. Prevalence of the fungus is higher in soils in which crop rotation is rare and peanut farming has been the only usage for an extended period.

== Thecaphora frezzii infection of Argentinian peanut farms ==
T. frezzii was first detected in 1955 in the Córdoba Province. By 2011, the fungus had reached 100% prevalence in production fields, with disease incidence reaching up to 52% of plants. In 2016, the reported total yield loss was equal to $14,151,800 for Argentina.

Many methods of management have been attempted but have proven to be ineffective against the fungus. The most effective method reported is cultivating resistant strains of peanut. While cultivated peanut plants have low genetic diversity, T. frezzii has high genetic variability making it difficult to cultivate resistant plants.

Recent studies have begun testing biological control options by using other organisms such as bacteria or fungi to control the fungus. One organism that has been tested in Argentina is Trichoderma harazianum.
