= Urocystis brassicae =

Scientific classification
- Kingdom: Fungi
- Division: Basidiomycota
- Class: Ustilaginomycetes
- Order: Urocystidales
- Family: Urocystidiaceae
- Genus: Urocystis
- Species: U. brassicae

Binomial name
- Urocystis brassicae Mundk., (1938)

Species of fungus

Urocystis brassicae is a gall smut and a plant pathogen that stunts the infected plants. It is known to create root galls on Indian Mustard (Brassica campestris) and other Brassica species.

== Physical characteristics ==
=== Gall characteristics ===
The wart-like galls of U. brassicae grow on the roots of plants. When young, the galls are white in color. As they age, they become a grayish-black colored gall with a 2–5 cm diameter.

=== Spore characteristics ===
Urocystis brassicae has two types of spores. One is fertile and the other is sterile. Fertile spores are a deep brown color with dimensions of approximately 20 by 16 μm. These fertile spores are surrounded by sterile spores that are elongated and a brighter brown than the fertile spores. These sterile spores are approximately 9.9 by 6.1 μm.

== Distribution of Urocystis brassicae ==
Urocystis brassicae is commonly found in India (Bihar) and China.
