= Gjaerumia =

Scientific classification
- Kingdom: Fungi
- Division: Basidiomycota
- Class: Exobasidiomycetes
- Order: Georgefischeriales
- Family: Gjaerumiaceae; R. Bauer, M. Lutz & Oberw.
- Genus: Gjaerumia; R. Bauer, M. Lutz & Oberw.

Species
- Gjaerumia eremuri; Gjaerumia muscari; Gjaerumia ossifragi

Family of fungi

The Gjaerumiaceae are a family of smut fungi in the Basidiomycota, class Exobasidiomycetes. The family is monotypic, and contains the single genus Gjaerumia. Species in the family are distributed in northern Europe, where they grow biotrophically in leaves of the bog asphodel.
