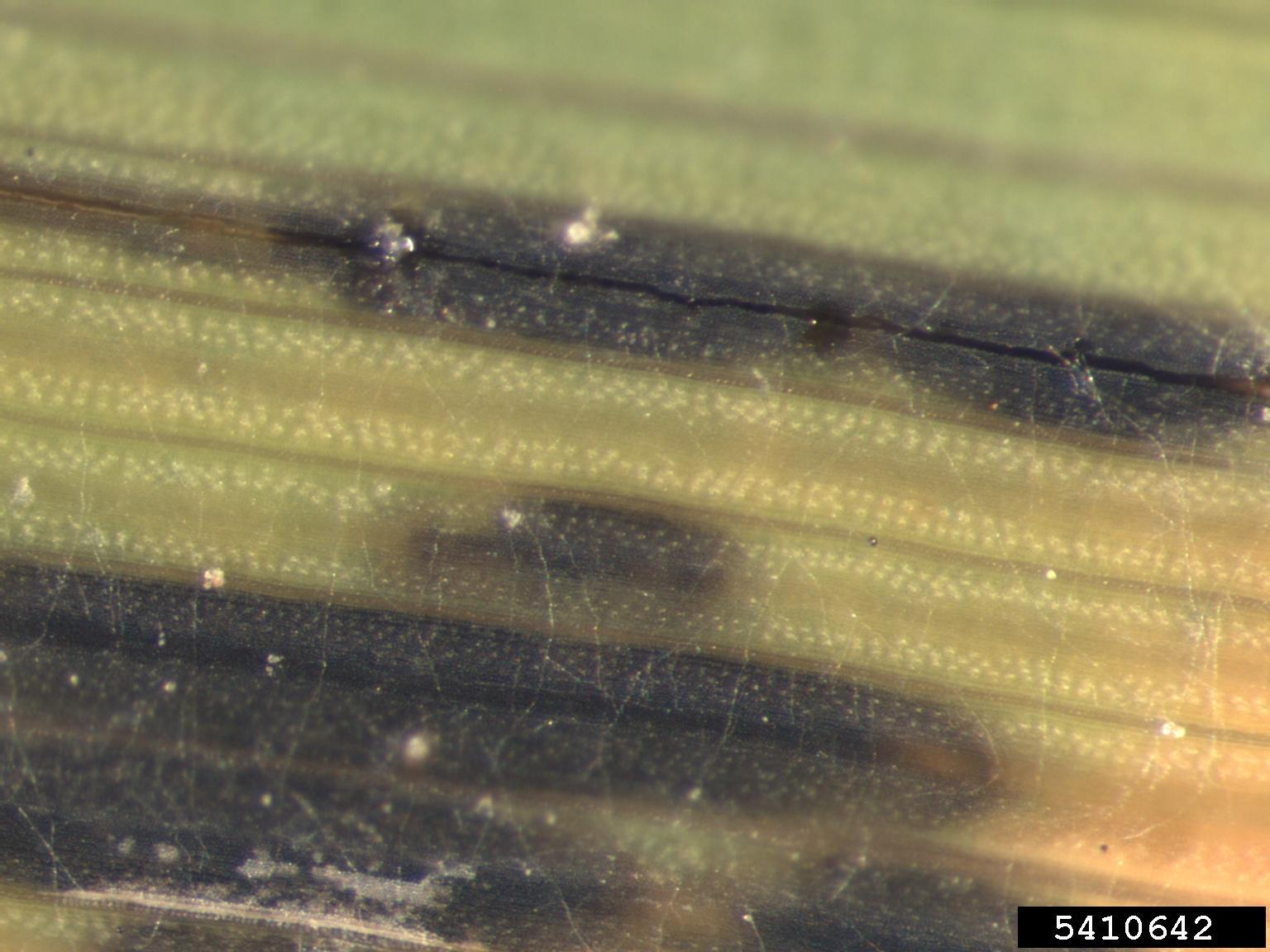
- Eballistra oryzae on Oryza sativa

Scientific classification
- Kingdom: Fungi
- Division: Basidiomycota
- Class: Exobasidiomycetes
- Order: Georgefischeriales
- Family: Eballistraceae; R. Bauer, Begerow, A. Nagler & Oberw.
- Genus: Eballistra; R. Bauer, Begerow, A. Nagler & Oberw.

Species
- Eballistra brachiariae Eballistra lineata Eballistra oryzae

= Eballistra =

Family of fungi

The Eballistraceae are a family of smut fungi in the Basidiomycota, class Exobasidiomycetes. This is a monotypic family, containing the single genus Eballistra, species of which have a widespread distribution in tropical regions.
