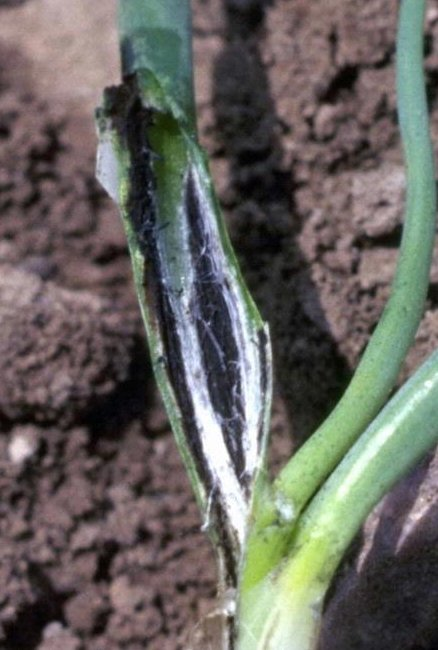
- Urocystis colchici on an onion seedling

Scientific classification
- Domain: Eukaryota
- Kingdom: Fungi
- Division: Basidiomycota
- Class: Ustilaginomycetes
- Order: Urocystidales
- Family: Urocystidiaceae
- Genus: Urocystis; Rabenh. ex Fuckel, 1870

Type species
- Urocystis occulta (Wallr.) A.A. Fisch. Waldh., 1867

= Urocystis =

Genus of fungi

Urocystis is a genus of smut fungi containing plant pathogens, which infect grass species and other plants.

== Host species of Urocystis ==
- Urocystis agropyri causes 'flag smut' on wheat.
- Urocystis alopecuri (foxtail smut), on foxtail grasses,
- Urocystis arxanensis infects Elymus spp.
- Urocystis brassicae infects Brassica spp
- Urocystis tritici, Wheat flag smut
- Urocystis tranzscheliana infects Primula sieboldii
- Urocystis xilinhotensis infects Bromus spp.

== Species ==
As accepted by Species Fungorum;

- Urocystis achnatheri
- Urocystis agropyri
- Urocystis agropyri-campestris
- Urocystis agropyri-juncei
- Urocystis agrostidis
- Urocystis alaskana
- Urocystis allii
- Urocystis alopecuri
- Urocystis alstroemeriae
- Urocystis americana
- Urocystis andina
- Urocystis anemones
- Urocystis anemones-narcissiflorae
- Urocystis antarctica
- Urocystis antipolitana
- Urocystis antucensis
- Urocystis aquilegiae
- Urocystis arjonae
- Urocystis arrhenatheri
- Urocystis arxanensis
- Urocystis asphodeli
- Urocystis atragenes
- Urocystis atropidis
- Urocystis aurea
- Urocystis avenae-elatioris
- Urocystis avenastri
- Urocystis beckmanniae
- Urocystis beckwithiae
- Urocystis behboudii
- Urocystis beijingensis
- Urocystis bolboschoeni
- Urocystis bolivarii
- Urocystis bomareae
- Urocystis bornmuelleri
- Urocystis brassicae
- Urocystis bromi
- Urocystis bulbigera
- Urocystis bulbinellae
- Urocystis bulbocodii
- Urocystis calamagrostidis
- Urocystis callianthemi
- Urocystis camassiae
- Urocystis carcinodes
- Urocystis caricis
- Urocystis castellana
- Urocystis cepulae
- Urocystis ceratocephali
- Urocystis chifengensis
- Urocystis cholerae
- Urocystis cholerae-asiaticae
- Urocystis chorizandrae
- Urocystis circaeasteri
- Urocystis clintoniae
- Urocystis colchici
- Urocystis colchici-lutei
- Urocystis coralloides
- Urocystis corsica
- Urocystis cortusae
- Urocystis corydalis
- Urocystis curculiginis
- Urocystis dactylidina
- Urocystis delphinii
- Urocystis deschampsiae
- Urocystis destruens
- Urocystis dioscoreae
- Urocystis dunhuangensis
- Urocystis elymi
- Urocystis eranthidis
- Urocystis eriospermi
- Urocystis erythronii
- Urocystis ferrarisiana
- Urocystis festucae
- Urocystis ficariae
- Urocystis filipendulae
- Urocystis fischeri
- Urocystis floccosa
- Urocystis flowersii
- Urocystis fraseri
- Urocystis gageae
- Urocystis galanthi
- Urocystis giliae
- Urocystis glabella
- Urocystis gladioli
- Urocystis gladiolicola
- Urocystis granulosa
- Urocystis hederae
- Urocystis helanensis
- Urocystis helvetica
- Urocystis herteriana
- Urocystis heucherae
- Urocystis hierochloae
- Urocystis hieronymi
- Urocystis hispanica
- Urocystis hordei
- Urocystis hordeicola
- Urocystis hypoxidis
- Urocystis intestinalis
- Urocystis irregularis
- Urocystis ixiolirii
- Urocystis jaapiana
- Urocystis japonica
- Urocystis johansonii
- Urocystis junci
- Urocystis juncophila
- Urocystis kmetiana
- Urocystis koeleriae
- Urocystis komarovii
- Urocystis lagerheimii
- Urocystis leersiae
- Urocystis leimbachii
- Urocystis leucoji
- Urocystis libyca
- Urocystis lithophragmatis
- Urocystis littoralis
- Urocystis luzulae
- Urocystis lybica
- Urocystis macrospora
- Urocystis macularis
- Urocystis mayorii
- Urocystis melicae
- Urocystis miyabeana
- Urocystis monotropae
- Urocystis multispora
- Urocystis murashkinskyi
- Urocystis muscaridis
- Urocystis mustaphae
- Urocystis narcissi
- Urocystis nevodovskyi
- Urocystis nivalis
- Urocystis novae-zelandiae
- Urocystis oblonga
- Urocystis occulta
- Urocystis ornithogali
- Urocystis ornithoglossi
- Urocystis orobanches
- Urocystis oryzae
- Urocystis oryzopsidis
- Urocystis oxalidis
- Urocystis oxygraphidis
- Urocystis pacifica
- Urocystis paraquilegiae
- Urocystis paridis
- Urocystis pedicularis
- Urocystis permagna
- Urocystis phaceliae
- Urocystis phalaridis
- Urocystis phlei
- Urocystis phlei-alpini
- Urocystis picbaueri
- Urocystis poae
- Urocystis poae-palustris
- Urocystis polygonati
- Urocystis preussii
- Urocystis primulae
- Urocystis primulicola
- Urocystis pseudoanemones
- Urocystis puccinelliae
- Urocystis pulsatillae
- Urocystis pulsatillae-albae
- Urocystis qinghaiensis
- Urocystis radicicola
- Urocystis ranunculi
- Urocystis ranunculi-alpestris
- Urocystis ranunculi-aucheri
- Urocystis ranunculi-auricomi
- Urocystis ranunculi-bullati
- Urocystis ranunculi-lanuginosi
- Urocystis rechingeri
- Urocystis reinhardii
- Urocystis rigida
- Urocystis rodgersiae
- Urocystis roivainenii
- Urocystis rostrariae
- Urocystis rytzii
- Urocystis schizocaulon
- Urocystis scilloides
- Urocystis secalis-silvestris
- Urocystis sichuanensis
- Urocystis simplex
- Urocystis sinensis
- Urocystis skirgielloae
- Urocystis sophiae
- Urocystis sorosporioides
- Urocystis sternbergiae
- Urocystis stipae
- Urocystis subnuda
- Urocystis syncocca
- Urocystis tessellata
- Urocystis thaxteri
- Urocystis tianschanica
- Urocystis tothii
- Urocystis tranzscheliana
- Urocystis trautvetteriae
- Urocystis trientalis
- Urocystis trillii
- Urocystis triseti
- Urocystis tritici
- Urocystis trollii
- Urocystis uleana
- Urocystis ulei
- Urocystis ulmariae
- Urocystis ungeri
- Urocystis vesicaria
- Urocystis violae
- Urocystis vulpiae
- Urocystis wangii
- Urocystis xilinhotensis
- Urocystis yunnanensis
