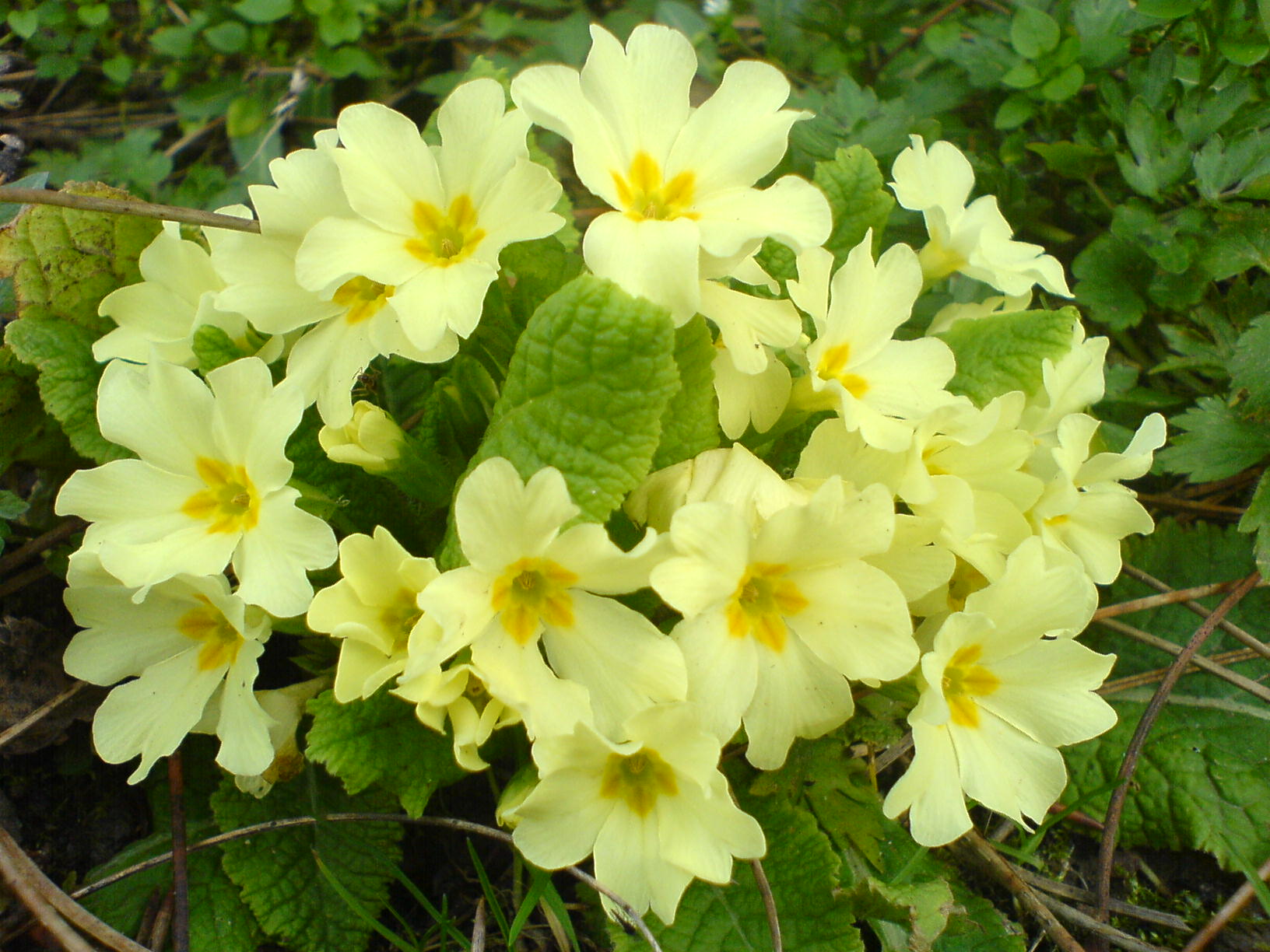

Scientific classification
- Kingdom: Plantae
- Clade: Tracheophytes
- Clade: Angiosperms
- Clade: Eudicots
- Clade: Asterids
- Order: Ericales
- Family: Primulaceae
- Genus: Primula
- Species: P. vulgaris

Binomial name
- Primula vulgaris Huds.

Synonyms
- List: Primula acaulis (L.) Hill; Primula atropurpurea Pax; Primula bicolor Raf.; Primula breviscapa Clairv.; Primula calycantha Retz.; Primula grandiflora Lam.; Primula hybrida Schrank; Primula inodora Hill; Primula minima Hablitz; Primula odorata Gilib.; Primula pseudoacaulis Schur; Primula sylvestris Scop.; Primula uniflora C.C.Gmel.; Primula variabilis Bastard; Primula vernalis Salisb.

= Primula vulgaris =

Species of flowering plant

Primula vulgaris is a species of flowering plant in the family Primulaceae, native to Eurasia. The common name of this plant is primrose, or occasionally common primrose or English primrose to distinguish it from other Primula species referred to as primroses.

== Description ==
Primula vulgaris is a perennial growing 10–30 centimetres (4–12 inches) tall, with a basal rosette of leaves which are more-or-less evergreen in favoured habitats. The leaves are 5–25 cm (2–10 in) long and 2–6 cm (1–2 1/2 in) broad, often heavily wrinkled, with an irregularly crenate to dentate margin. The leaf blade is gradually attenuated towards the base and unevenly toothed. The single stem, extremely short, is hidden in the centre of the leaf rosette.

Blooming in early spring in the Northern Hemisphere (February–April), the delicately scented flowers are 2–4 cm in diameter, borne singly on short slender stems. They are typically pale yellow, though white or pink forms are often seen in nature. The flowers are actinomorphic with a superior ovary which later forms a capsule opening by valves to release the small black seeds. The flowers are hermaphrodite but heterostylous; individual plants bear either pin flowers (longuistylous flower: with the capita of the style prominent) or thrum flowers (brevistylous flower: with the stamens prominent). Fertilisation can only take place between pin and thrum flowers. Pin-to-pin and thrum-to-thrum pollination is ineffective.

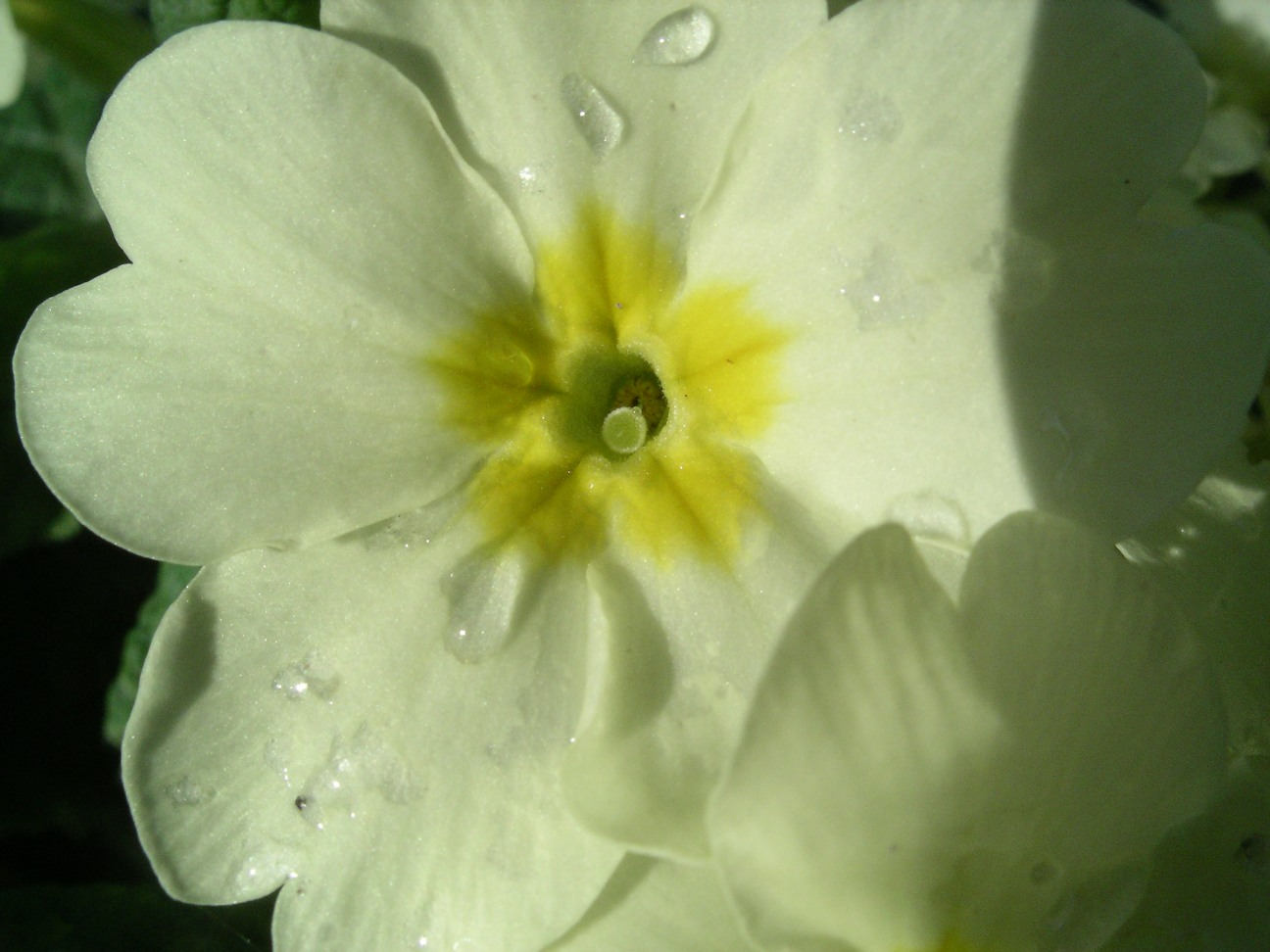
Pin flower

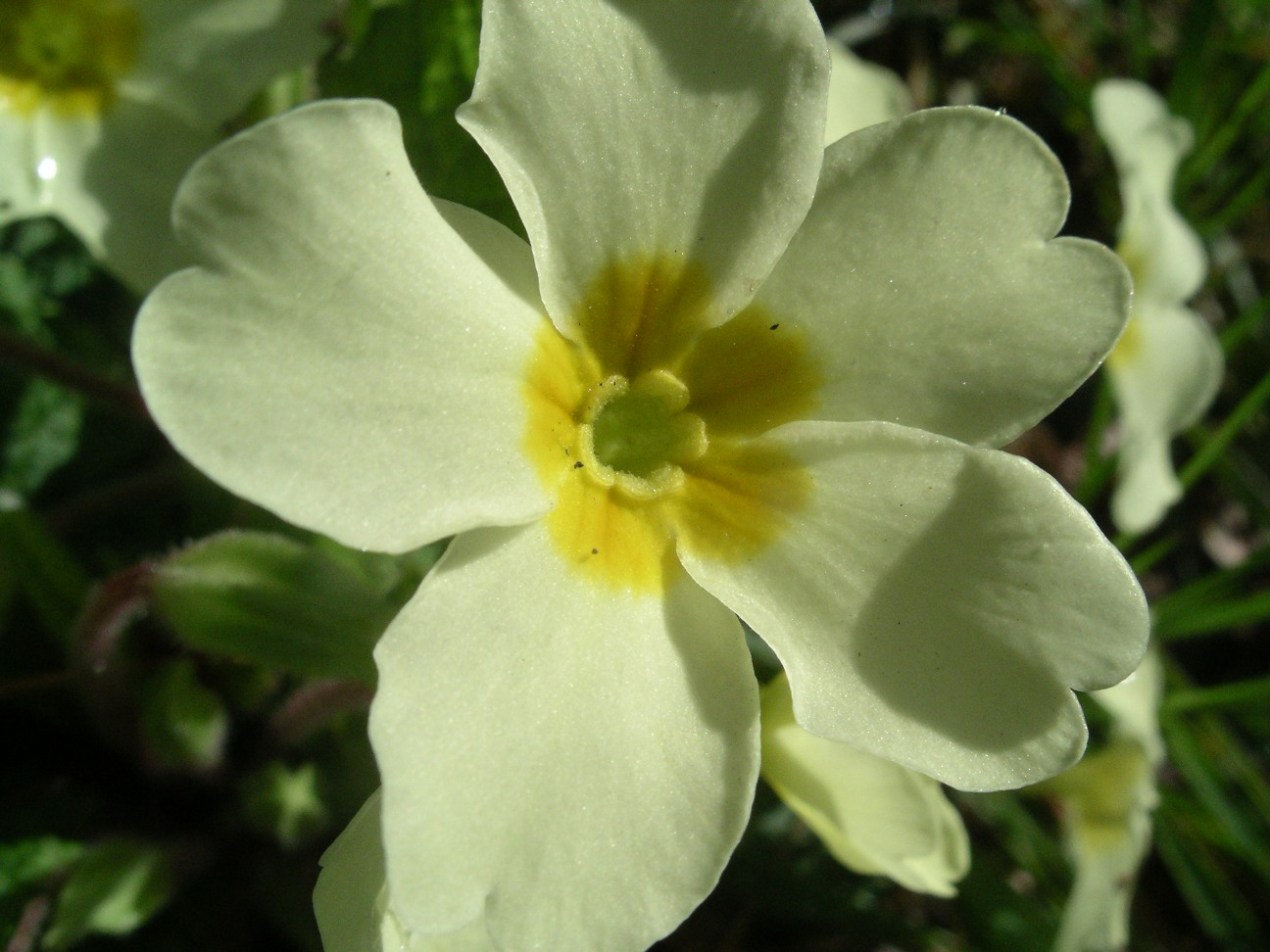
Thrum flower

== Taxonomy ==
=== Subspecies ===
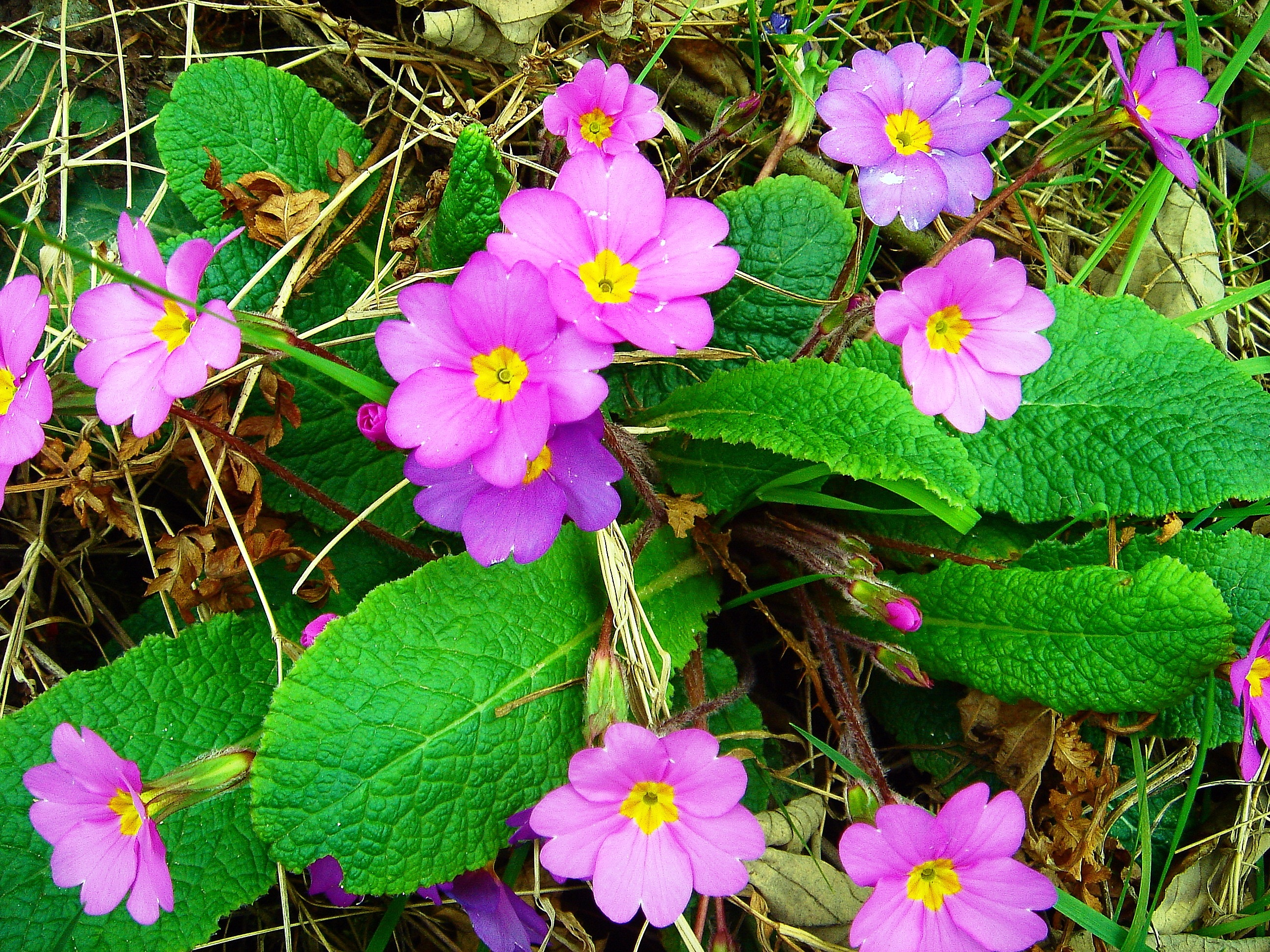
Primula vulgaris subsp. sibthorpii

Three subspecies are accepted by some sources:

- Primula vulgaris subsp. vulgaris. Western and southern Europe. As described above; flowers pale yellow.
- Primula vulgaris subsp. balearica (Willk.) W.W.Sm. & Forrest. Balearic Islands (endemic). Flowers white. Leaf stem longer than leaf blade.
- Primula vulgaris subsp. sibthorpii (Hoffmanns.) W.W.Sm. & Forrest. Balkans, southwest Asia. Flowers pink to red or purple.

Plants of the World Online accepts only one subspecies in addition to the nominate subsp. vulgaris:

- Primula vulgaris subsp. atlantica (Maire & Wilczek) Greuter & Burdet. Morocco to Algeria.

The primrose is distinguished from other species of Primula by its pale yellow (in the nominate subspecies) flowers produced singly on long flower stalks which are covered in rather shaggy hairs. The flowers open flat rather than concave as in the case of Primula veris, the cowslip.

A pink form is widely seen, growing amongst the much more common yellow forms; this may be a genetic variant rather than a garden escape. Occasional red forms are more likely to be naturalised from garden varieties.

=== Etymology ===
The scientific name Primula is a diminutive of the Latin primus 'prime', alluding to the fact that this flower is among the first to appear in spring. The vernacular name has the same meaning: primrose derives from a late Latin form prima rosa, consisting of prima 'first' (feminine), and rosa 'rose'.

The Latin specific epithet vulgaris means "common", in the sense of "widespread".

== Distribution and habitat ==
The native range of P. vulgaris encompasses western and southern Europe. In the north, the distribution area extends from central Norway near the Faroe Islands via the British Isles, Denmark, northern Germany, the Netherlands, Belgium and France to southern Portugal in the south and the tip of North Africa in Algeria. To the east, the range extends through the southern European peninsulas to the Crimea, Balkans, Syria, Turkey, and Armenia.

In appropriate conditions, P. vulgaris can cover the ground in open woods and shaded hedgerows. It is found mainly by streams, under bushes, in orchards and clear, moist deciduous forests. Occasionally it also appears in meadows. In Central Europe plants thrive best on nutrient-rich, but lime-poor, humus-rich, loose and often stony loam soils in winter-mild situations. In more populated areas it has sometimes suffered from over-collection and theft so that few natural displays of primroses in abundance can now be found. However it is common on motorway verges and railway embankments where human intervention is restricted. To prevent excessive damage to the species, picking of primroses or the removal of primrose plants from the wild is illegal in many countries, e.g. the UK Wildlife and Countryside Act 1981.

== Ecology ==
=== Pollinators ===
Most (90%) individuals are heterostylous, the minority monostylous. The flowers of the species are visited by a variety of insects, including butterflies (Lepidoptera), Hymenoptera, beetles (Coleoptera) and Diptera. Which visitors pollinate plants is not fully established. However, good pollinators are said to be bumblebees and hairy flies of the genus Bombylius. However, the most common visitors to the flowers are small beetles of the genus Meligethes – often there are up to 12 or more pollen-covered individuals in a single flower. The beetles also fly from flower to flower and, at least theoretically, are well suited as pollinators.

=== Seed dispersal ===
The seeds have an elaiosome and are spread by ants (myrmecochory). Small mammals also feed on and transport the seeds.

=== Herbivores and pathogens ===
Numerous invertebrate herbivores in the orders Diptera and Lepidoptera feed on the leaves of P. vulgaris, including multiple moth species in the genera Noctua and Xestia.

Several pathogenic fungi and oomycetes infect the leaves of P. vulgaris, including the rust fungus Puccinia primulae and the downy mildew Peronospora oerteliana. The smut fungus Urocystis primulae infects the flowers.

Primrose flowers, and the flowers of related members of the Primulaceae, are often removed from their stalks and scattered on the ground by bullfinches apparently consuming the ovaries and nectaries. Pheasants, sparrows, and fallow and muntjac deer are also known to eat the flowers. Small mammals both feed on and transport the seeds.

== Cultivation ==
The wild primrose is a staple of cottage garden plantings, and is widely available as seeds or young plants. It grows best in moist but well-drained soil in light shade. It is increased by seed and division. The throat is usually coloured rich yellow.

Primrose breeding of named coloured varieties became popular in the nineteenth and early twentieth century. Numerous cultivars have been selected for garden planting, often derived from subsp. sibthorpii or hybrids between the subspecies; these and other garden hybrids are available in a wide range of colours, including white, yellow and red, or brown and red in all gradations as well as dark red, pink, purple, dark brown and dark blue, and with an extended flowering season.

The term Polyanthus, or Primula × polyantha, refers to various tall-stemmed and multi-coloured strains of P. vulgaris × P. veris hybrids. Though perennial, they may be short-lived and are typically grown from seed or from young plants as biennials.

=== AGM cultivars ===
The following have received the Royal Horticultural Society's Award of Garden Merit:

- Primula vulgaris
- Primula vulgaris subsp. sibthorpii (Sibthorp primrose)
- Primula vulgaris subsp. vulgaris
- Primula vulgaris 'Taigetos'

== Uses ==
Both flowers and leaves are edible, the flavour ranging between mild lettuce and more bitter salad greens. The leaves can be cooked in soup but preferably with other plants because they are sometimes a little strong. The leaves can also be used for tea, and the young flowers can be made into primrose wine. In the past the whole plant and especially the root were considered to have analgesic, anti-spasmodic, diuretic and expectorant properties. It contains small amounts of saponins, and was given for colds. P. vulgaris foliage contains significant amounts of vitamin C.

== In culture ==
The primrose was Benjamin Disraeli's favourite flower; Primrose Day and the Primrose League were given their names in honour of this.

Primroses also appear as a charge in heraldry, for example the coat of arms of the Earl of Rosebery.

Italy chose a fuchsia primrose as the symbol of its 2020 COVID-19 vaccination campaign.

The primrose is on one side of Austria's 5 euro cent coin.

Primrose Yellow exists in some paint and color systems and is named after this flower.

The primrose occurs frequently in Romantic poetry, and has been celebrated, among others, by poets such as Keats, Wordsworth, Wilde, Goldsmith and Chaucer. In common parlance, the phrase "the primrose path" implies the thoughtless pursuit of pleasure, especially when it is seen to bring disastrous consequences. The original allusion is a reference in Shakespeare's Hamlet (1.3.48-52) to "the primrose path of dalliance".

The old Roman name of the Primrose was Paralisos, that of the son of Priapus and Flora, who died of grief for the loss of his betrothed Melicerta, but was, by his parents, metamorphosed into the flower.

Primrose Everdeen from the Hunger Games is named after this plant.

== Gallery ==
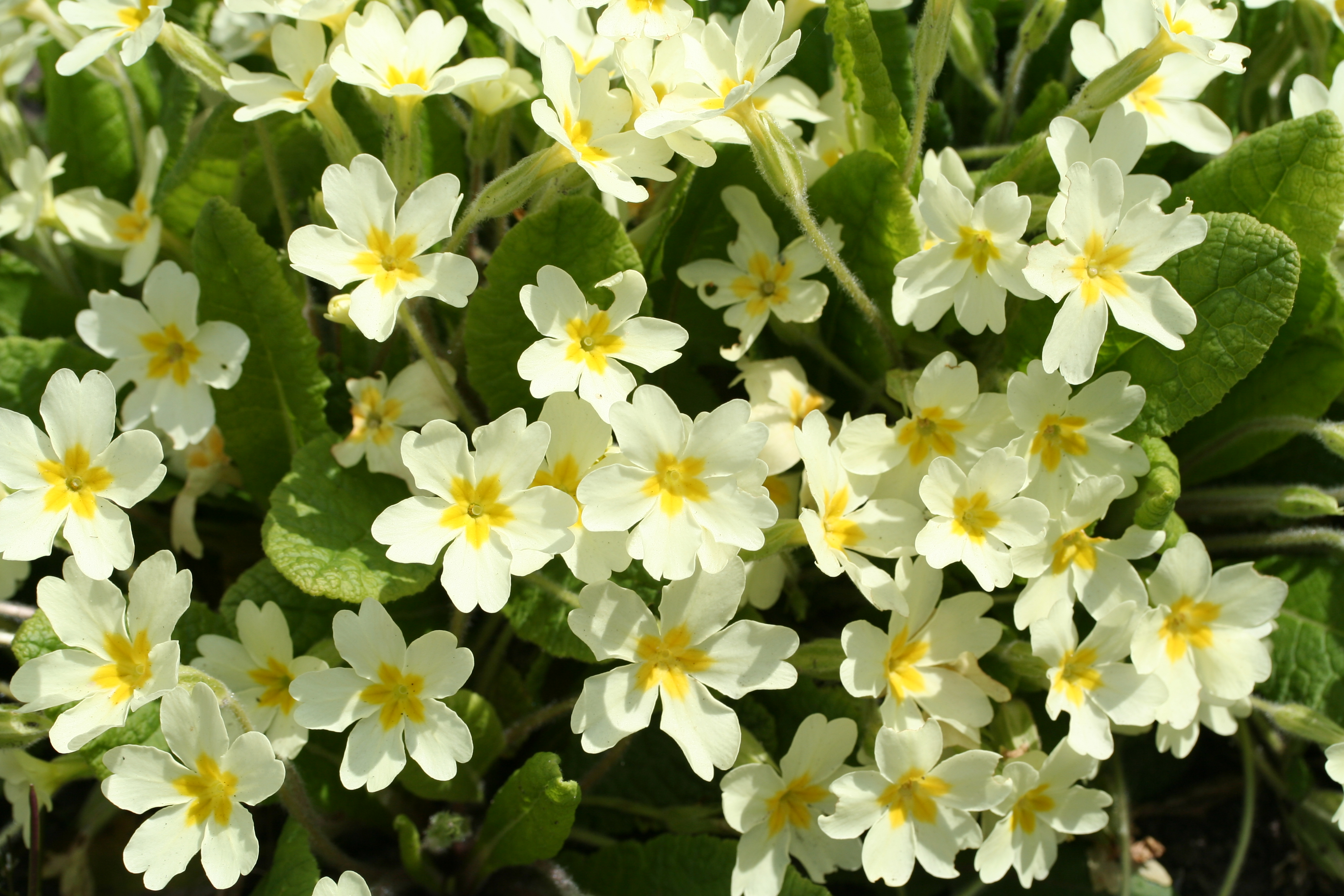
Yellow flowers

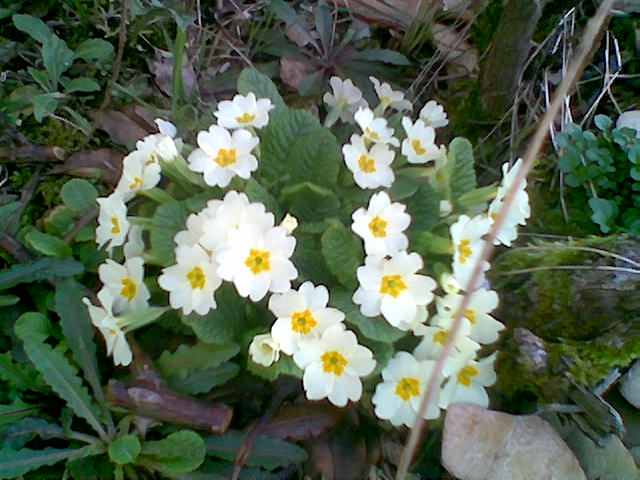
White flowers

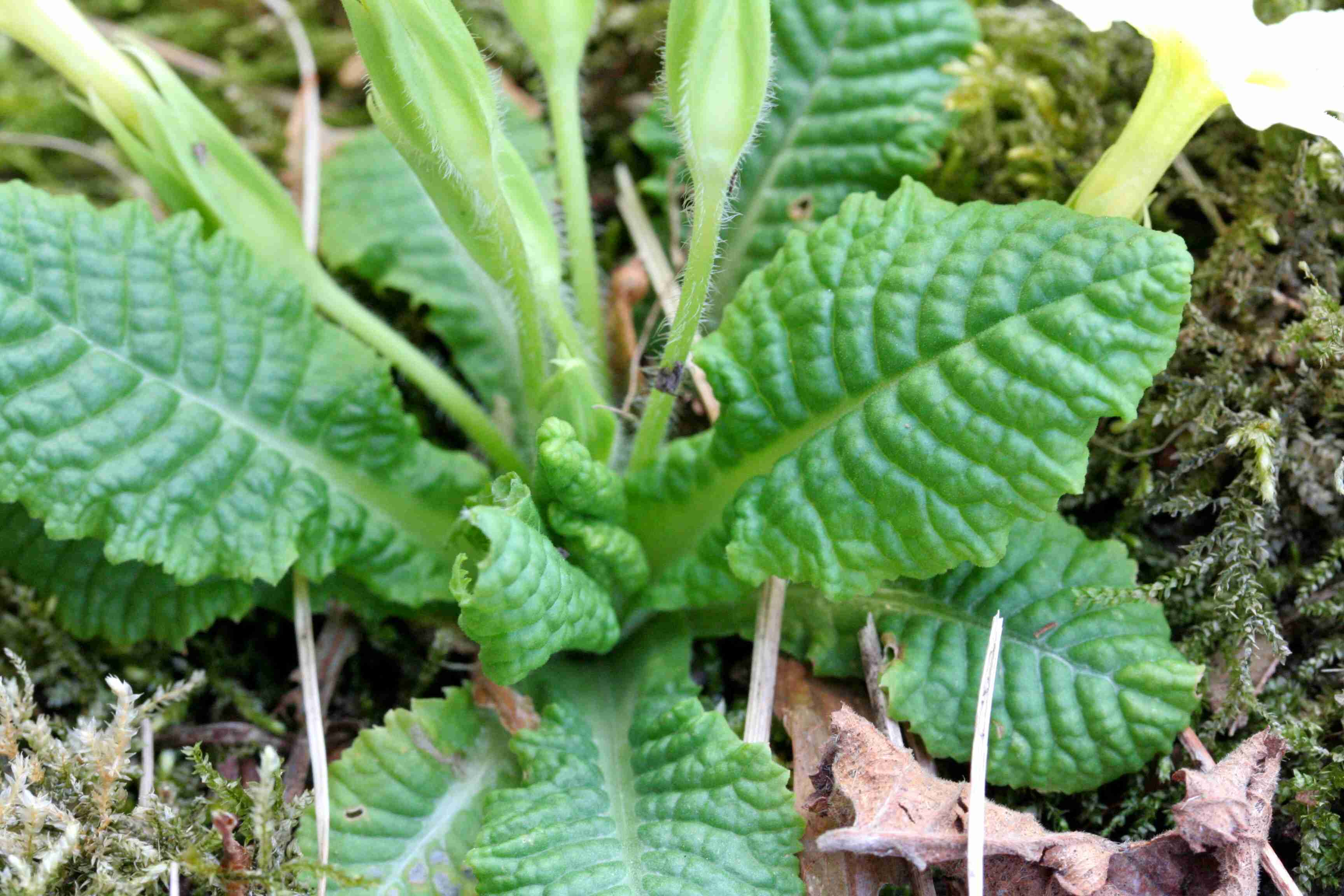
Leaves

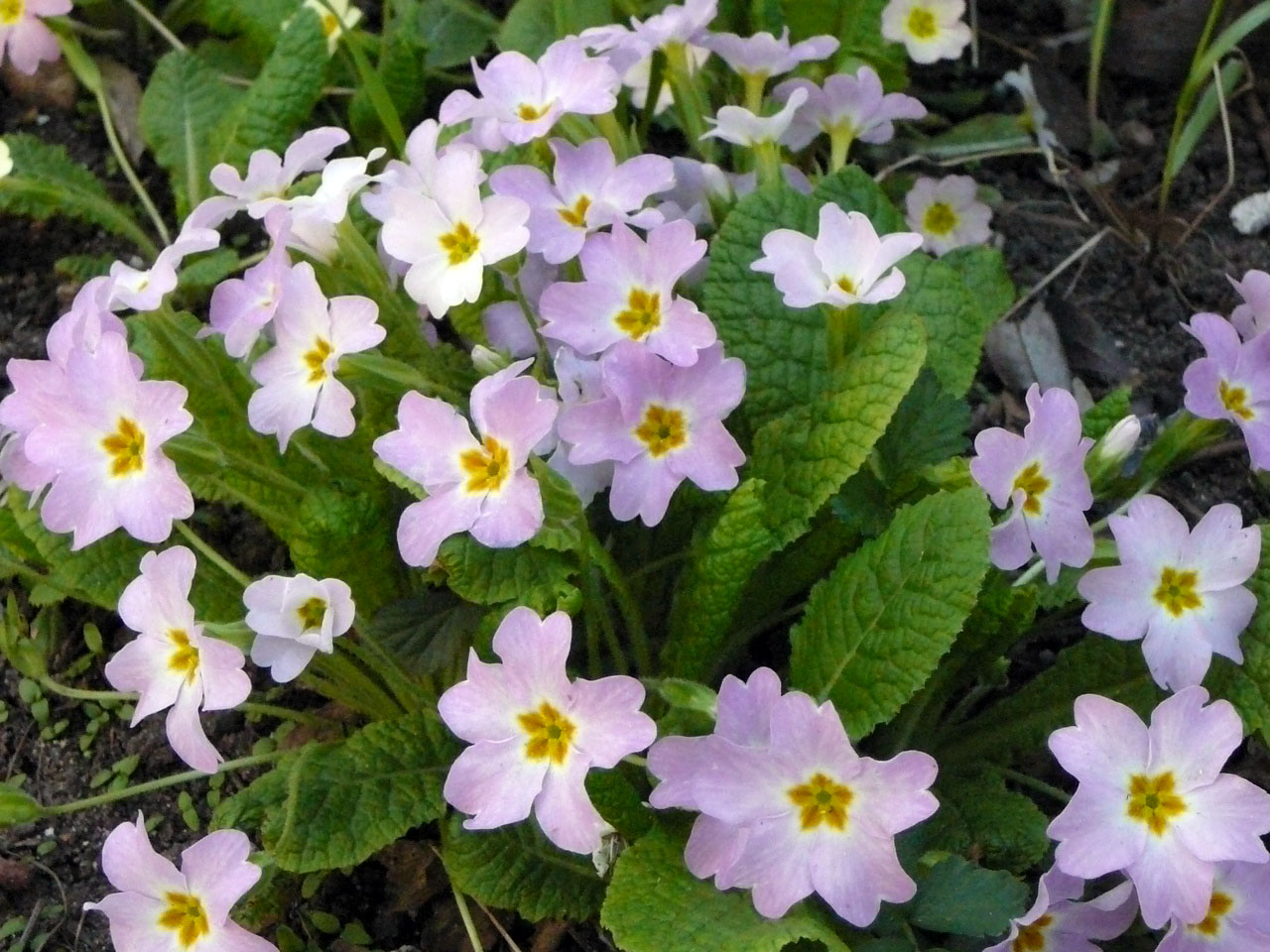
Light pink flowers (subsp. sibthorpii)

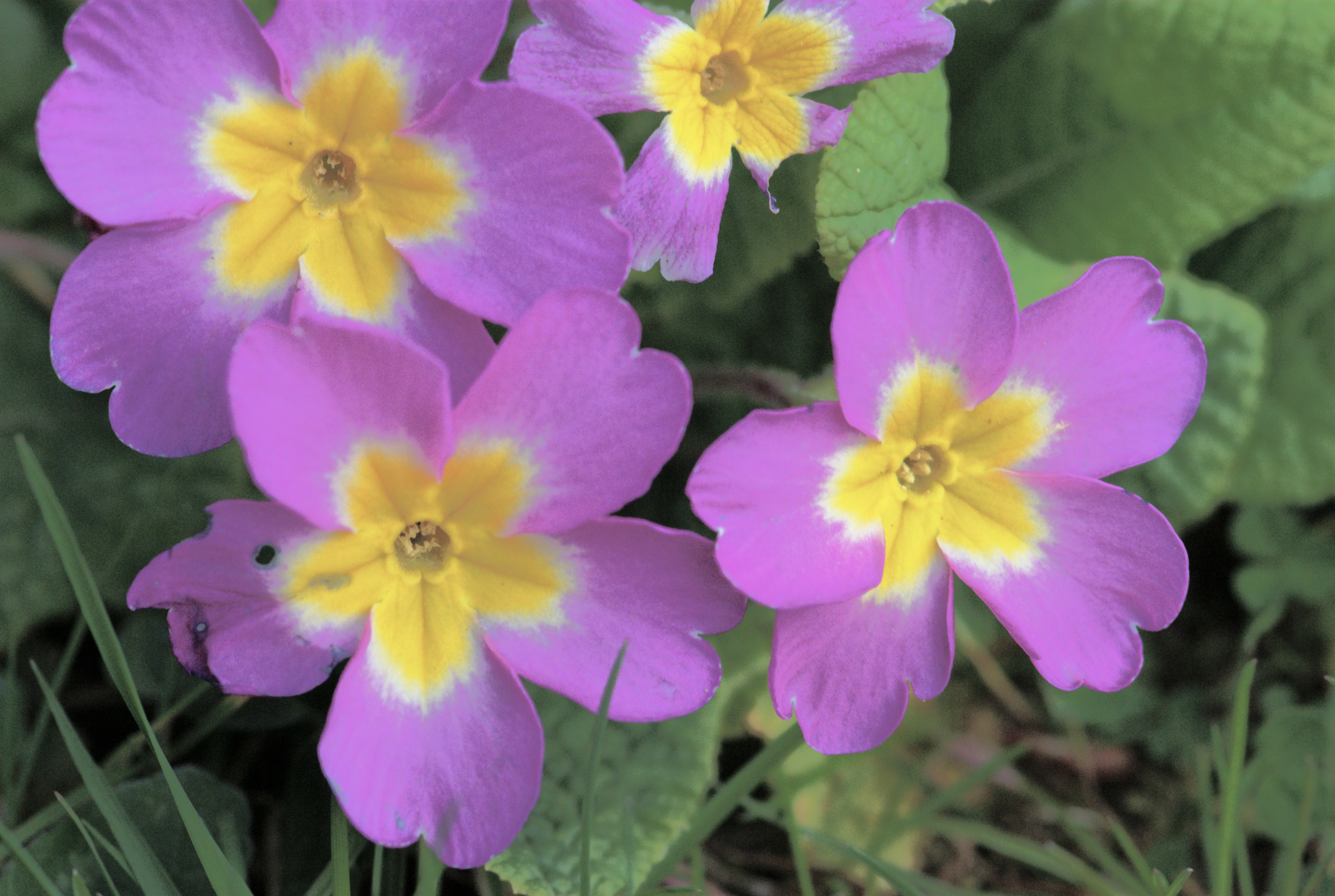
Purple flowers (subsp. sibthorpii)

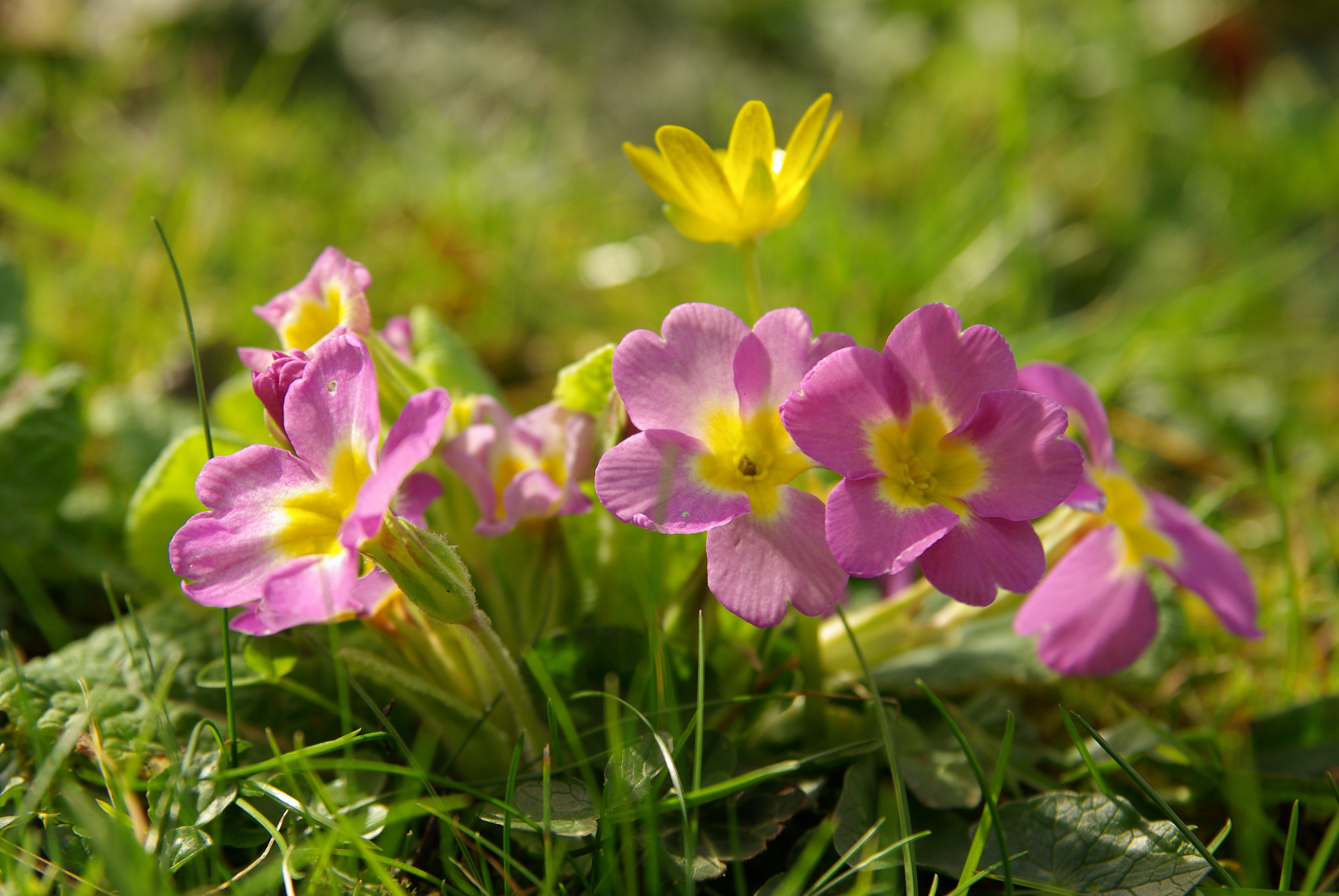
Light purple (subsp. sibthorpii)

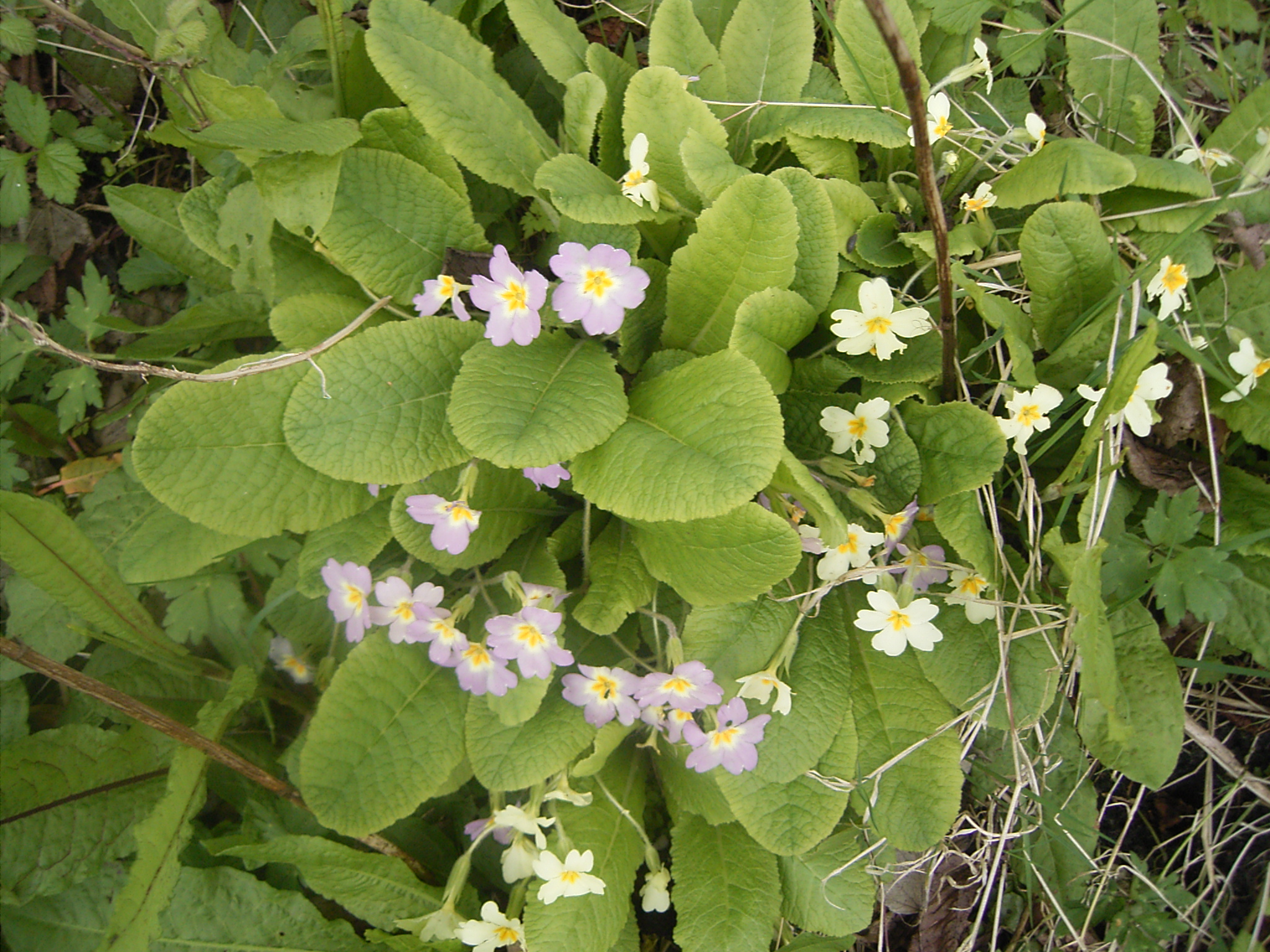
P. vulgaris and subsp. sibthorpii mix

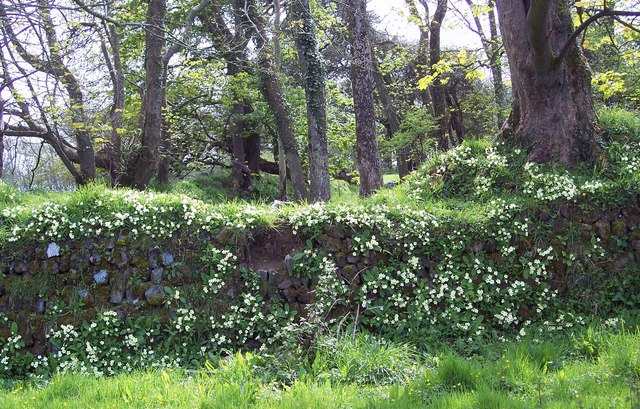
Habitat

== See also ==
- Oenothera
