= Tilletiariaceae =

Scientific classification
- Kingdom: Fungi
- Division: Basidiomycota
- Class: Exobasidiomycetes
- Order: Georgefischeriales
- Family: Tilletiariaceae; R.T. Moore

Type genus
- Tilletiaria Bandoni & B.N. Johri

Genera
- Phragmotaenium; Tilletiaria; Tolyposporella

Family of fungi

The Tilletiariaceae are a family of smut fungi in the Basidiomycota, class Exobasidiomycetes. Species in the family have a widespread distribution, and typically grow biotrophically in the leaves and flowers of various grasses.
