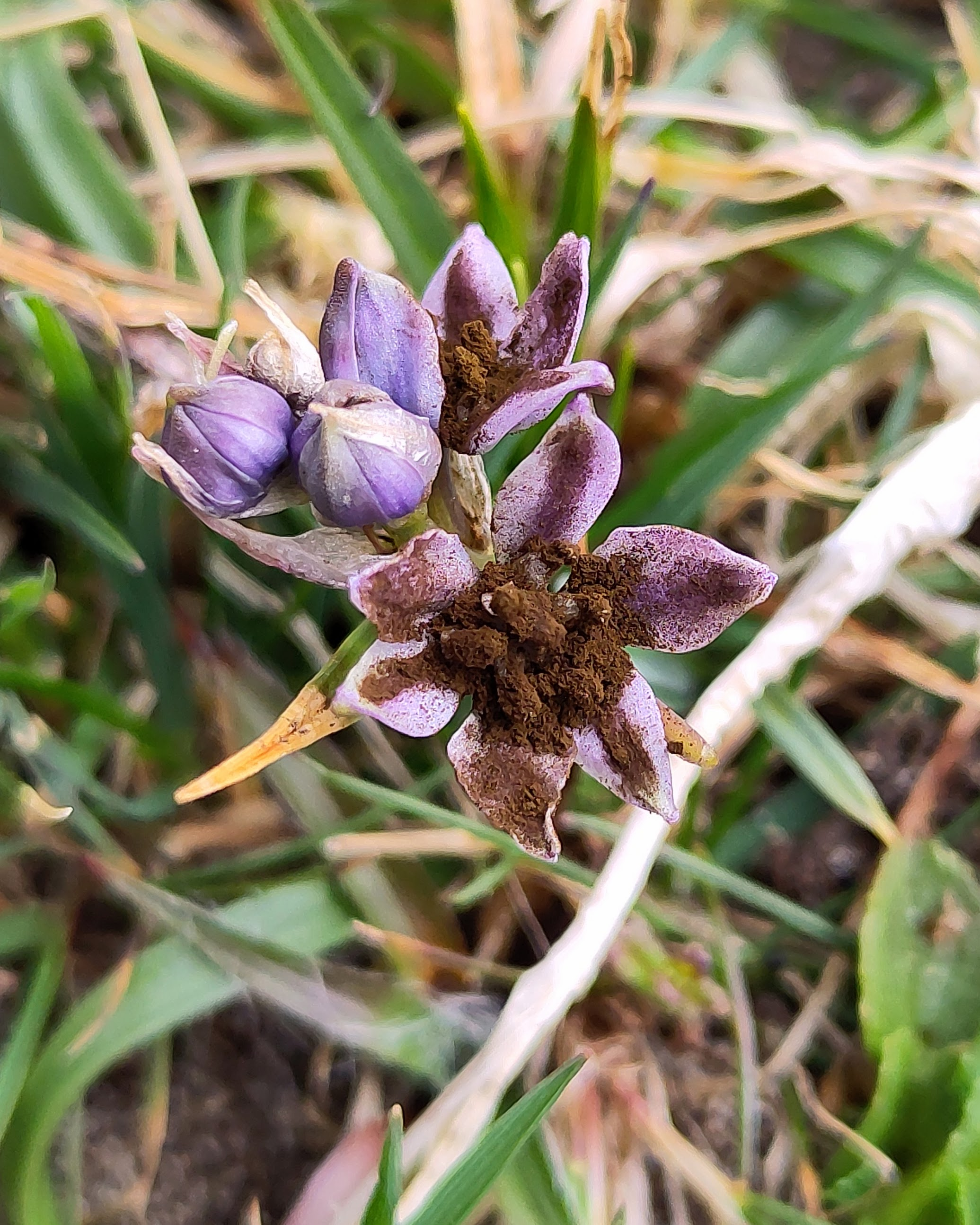
- Spores of Antherospora tractemae on flowers of Scilla verna

Scientific classification
- Domain: Eukaryota
- Kingdom: Fungi
- Division: Basidiomycota
- Class: Ustilaginomycetes
- Order: Urocystidales
- Family: Floromycetaceae
- Genus: Antherospora; R. Bauer, M. Lutz, Begerow, Piątek & Vánky

= Antherospora =

Genus of fungi

Antherospora is a genus of fungal plant pathogens. They are smut fungi parasitising plants in the Scilloideae.
