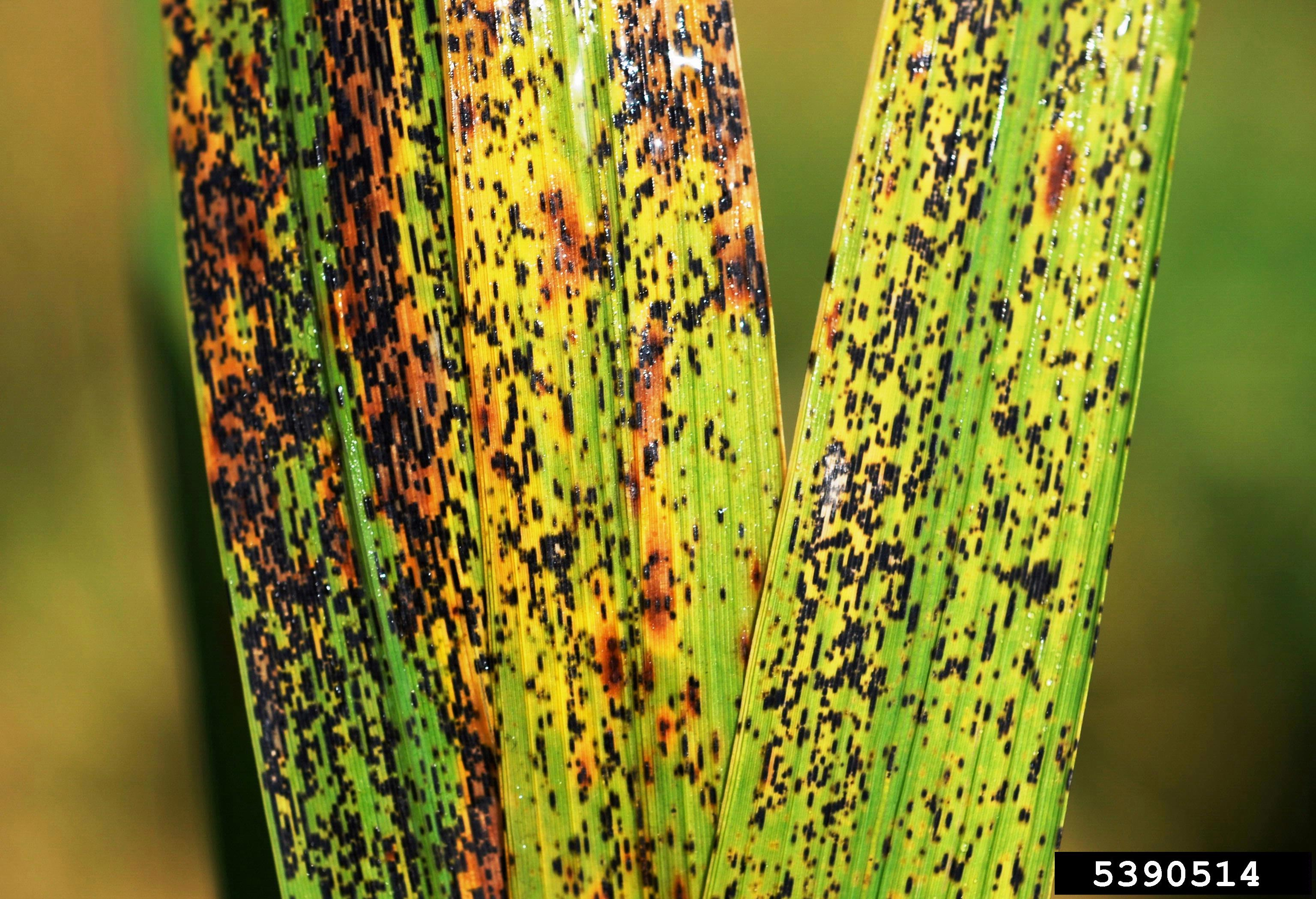
- Eballistra oryzae on Oryza sativa

Scientific classification
- Domain: Eukaryota
- Kingdom: Fungi
- Division: Basidiomycota
- Class: Exobasidiomycetes
- Order: Georgefischeriales
- Family: Eballistraceae
- Genus: Eballistra
- Species: E. oryzae

Binomial name
- Eballistra oryzae (Syd. & P.Syd.) R.Bauer, (2001)

Synonyms
- Entyloma oryzae Syd. & P. Syd., (1914)

= Eballistra oryzae =

Species of fungus

Eballistra oryzae is a plant pathogen of rice also known as leaf smut.

== Resistant hosts ==
Some rice cultivars are resistant against leaf smut.
