= Eballistra lineata =

Scientific classification
- Domain: Eukaryota
- Kingdom: Fungi
- Division: Basidiomycota
- Class: Exobasidiomycetes
- Order: Georgefischeriales
- Family: Eballistraceae
- Genus: Eballistra
- Species: E. lineata

Binomial name
- Eballistra lineata (Cooke) R.Bauer, Begerow, A.Nagler & Oberw. (2001)

Synonyms
- Entyloma lineatum (Cooke) Davis; Ustilago lineata Cooke (1882)

Species of fungus

Eballistra lineata is a fungal plant pathogen that causes stem smut in rice.
