= Doassansiopsis =

Scientific classification
- Domain: Eukaryota
- Kingdom: Fungi
- Division: Basidiomycota
- Class: Ustilaginomycetes
- Order: Urocystidales
- Family: Doassansiopsidaceae
- Genus: Doassansiopsis (Setch.) Dietel

Genus of fungi

Doassansiopsis is a genus of smut fungi belonging to the monotypic family Doassansiopsidaceae Begerow, R.Bauer & Oberw., 1998, within the class Ustilaginomycetes and order Urocystidales.

When order Urocystidales was formed in 1997, and consisted (then) of 4 new families, (Doassansiopsidaceae, Glomosporiaceae, Melanotaeniaceae and Urocystidaceae with 1 genus.

The family Doassansiopsidaceae was created by Begerow, R.Bauer & Oberw. in 1998.

Members within the Doassansiopsaceae family and family Urocystaceae (or Urocystidaceae) which are both within the order Urocystidales, share a common ultrastructure.

== Hosts ==
The leaves of the water-lily (Nymphaea nouchali) can be affected by the water-born fungi, Doassansiopsis nymphaea. The leaves of Caldesia parnassifolia (Alisma reniforme) can be affected by the water-born fungi, Doassansiopsis hydrophila (A.Dietr.) Lavrov (syn Doassansiopsis martianoffiana).

== Species ==
As accepted by Species Fungorum;

- Doassansiopsis caldesiae Piątek & Vánky (2008)
- Doassansiopsis deformans (Setch.) Dietel (1897)
- Doassansiopsis euryaleae R.A.B. Verma & V. Jha (1999)
- Doassansiopsis furva (Davis) Vánky (1981)
- Doassansiopsis guangdongensis S.H. He & L. Guo (2007)
- Doassansiopsis horiana (Henn.) Y.Z. Shen (1934)
- Doassansiopsis hydrophila (H.A. Dietr.) Lavrov (1937)
- Doassansiopsis intermedia (Setch.) Vánky (1981)
- Doassansiopsis limnanthemi (Cif.) Vánky (2007)
- Doassansiopsis limnocharidis (Cif.) Vánky (1992)
- Doassansiopsis nymphaeae (Syd. & P. Syd.) Thirum. (1947)
- Doassansiopsis nymphoides Vánky (2002)
- Doassansiopsis occulta (H. Hoffm.) Dietel (1897)
- Doassansiopsis ticonis M. Piepenbr. (1995)
- Doassansiopsis tomasii Vánky (2006)

Former genera;

- D. martianoffiana (Thüm.) Dietel (1897) = Doassansiopsis hydrophila
- D. pustulata (Setch.) Dietel (1897) = Burrillia pustulata in Doassansiaceae family
