= Glomosporium =

Scientific classification
- Domain: Eukaryota
- Kingdom: Fungi
- Division: Basidiomycota
- Class: Ustilaginomycetes
- Order: Urocystidales
- Family: Glomosporiaceae
- Genus: Glomosporium; Kochman

Genus of fungi

Glomosporium is a former genus of fungi, formerly placed in the family Glomosporiaceae. The genus was first described by Kochman in 1939. They were later absorbed into the genus Thecaphora.

The former genus had a cosmopolitan distribution.

== Former species ==
As accepted by Species Fungorum;

- Glomosporium amaranthi Hirschh. (1945) now Thecaphora amaranthi
- Glomosporium leptideum (Syd. & P.Syd.) Kochman (1939) now Thecaphora leptideum
