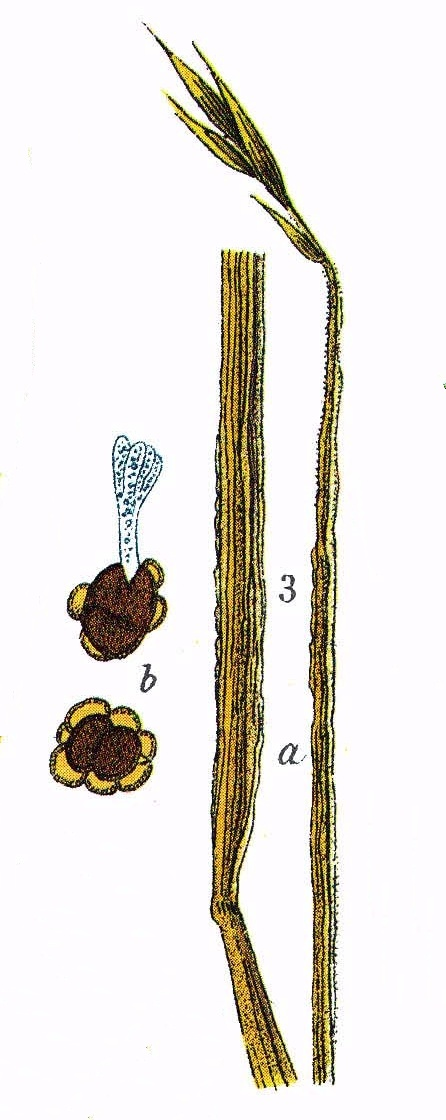

Scientific classification
- Domain: Eukaryota
- Kingdom: Fungi
- Division: Basidiomycota
- Class: Ustilaginomycetes
- Order: Urocystidales
- Family: Urocystidiaceae
- Genus: Urocystis
- Species: U. occulta

Binomial name
- Urocystis occulta (Wallr.) Rabenh. (1857)

Synonyms
- List: Erysiphe occulta Wallr. (1833); Peripherostoma parallelum (Sowerby) Gray, (1821); Polycystis occulta (Wallr.) Schltdl. (1852); Polycystis parallela (Berk.) Fr. (1849); Sphaeria parallela Sowerby; Tuburcinia occulta (Wallr.) Liro (1922); Tuburcinia secalis Uljan.,(1939); Uredo parallela (Sowerby) Berk. (1836); Urocystis parallela (Berk.) A.A. Fisch. Waldh. (1870); Ustilago occulta (Wallr.) Rabenh. ex Zundel,(1951)

= Urocystis occulta =

Species of fungus

Urocystis occulta is a smut fungus which attacks the leaves and stalks of rye (Secale cereale).

It is found in Australia, Europe, and North America. The fungus was first described by German botanist Karl Friedrich Wilhelm Wallroth under the name Erysiphe occulta in 1833, before being renamed as Urocystis occulta in 1857 by German botanist and mycologist Gottlob Ludwig Rabenhorst.
