= Ceratorhiza hydrophila =

Scientific classification
- Kingdom: Fungi
- Division: Basidiomycota
- Class: Agaricomycetes
- Order: Cantharellales
- Family: Ceratobasidiaceae
- Genus: Ceratorhiza
- Species: C. hydrophila

Binomial name
- Ceratorhiza hydrophila (Sacc.) Xu et al.

Synonyms
- Sclerotium hydrophilum Sacc.

Species of flowering plant

Ceratorhiza hydrophila is an anamorphic species of fungus in the family Ceratobasidiaceae. It is a plant pathogen, formerly known as Sclerotium hydrophilum, causing Globular Sclerotial Disease in rice.
