= Georgefischeriaceae =

Scientific classification
- Kingdom: Fungi
- Division: Basidiomycota
- Class: Exobasidiomycetes
- Order: Georgefischeriales
- Family: Georgefischeriaceae; R. Bauer, Begerow & Oberw.

Type genus
- Georgefischeria Thirum. & Naras.

Genera
- Georgefischeria; Jamesdicksonia

Family of fungi

The Georgefischeriaceae are a family of smut fungi in the Basidiomycota, class Exobasidiomycetes. Species in the family have a widespread distribution in both warm temperate areas and Old World tropical regions.

The genus name of Georgefischeria is in honour of George William Fischer (1906 - 1995), an American botanist and phytopathologist, who wrote 'Manual of the North American smut fungi'.
