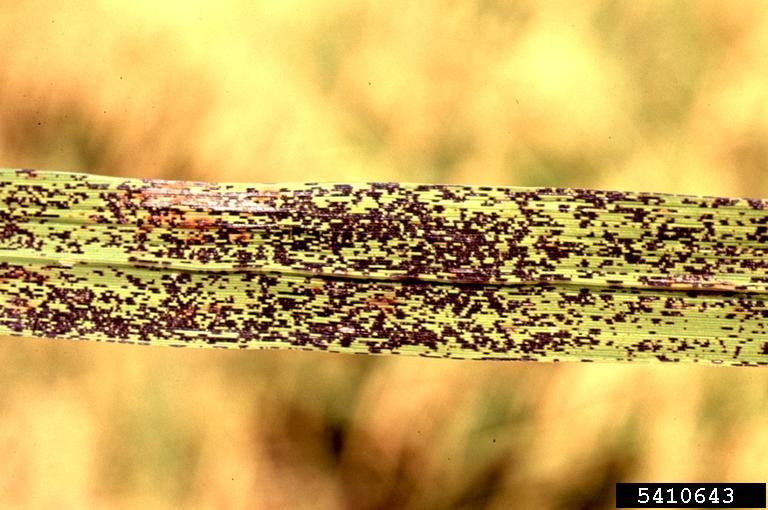
- Eballistra oryzae on Oryza sativa

Scientific classification
- Kingdom: Fungi
- Division: Basidiomycota
- Class: Exobasidiomycetes
- Order: Georgefischeriales; R.Bauer, Begerow & Oberw. (1997)

Families
- Eballistraceae; Georgefischeriaceae; Gjaerumiaceae; Tilletiariaceae

= Georgefischeriales =

Order of fungi

The Georgefischeriales are an order of smut fungi in the class Exobasidiomycetes. The order consists of four families, the Eballistraceae, the Georgefischeriaceae, the Gjaerumiaceae, and the Tilletiariaceae.
