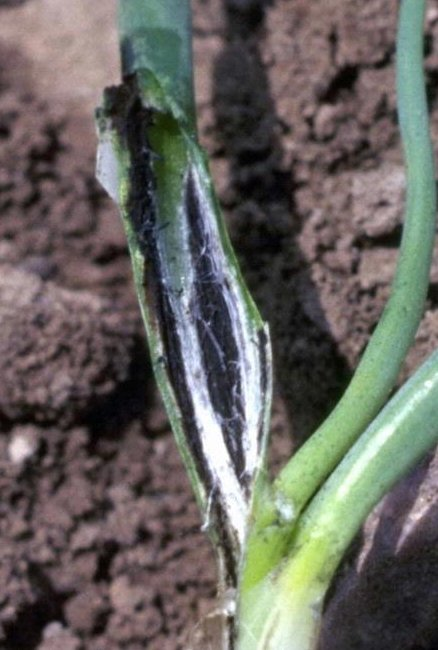
- Urocystis colchici on onions

Scientific classification
- Kingdom: Fungi
- Division: Basidiomycota
- Class: Ustilaginomycetes
- Order: Urocystidales; R. Bauer & Oberw., 1997

Synonyms
- Urocystidiales R. Bauer & Oberw.; Urocystales R. Bauer & Oberw.

= Urocystidales =

Order of fungi

The Urocystidales are an order of fungi within the class Ustilaginomycetes. The order contains 6 families and about 400 genera. They are a sister order to Ustilaginales.

Urocystidales is also known and classified as the smut fungi. They are serious plant pathogens, Urocystis, is one of the representative genera of the order, it is an example of a smut genus that has a wide host range. The type species Urocystis occulta (Wallr.) A.A. Fisch. Waldh (1867), was described as a pathogen on rye (Secale cereale). They are found in marine and terrestrial environments. The aquatic members of the Doassansiopsis genera are found in the tropics or subtropics.

== Morphology ==
They are distinguished from other fungi by the existence of haustoria (root-like structure) and pores in the septa of soral hyphae.

== Families ==
It was formed in 1997, and consisted (then) of 4 families, (Doassansiopsidaceae, Glomosporiaceae, Melanotaeniaceae and Urocystidaceae with 1 genus.

Later, Melanotaeniaceae was moved to the Ustilaginales order by Begerow et al. in 2006, and others were added such as Fereydouniaceae and Floromycetaceae in 2014 S. Nasr, Soudi, H.D.T. Nguyen, M. Lutz & Piątek, and Mycosyringaceae in 2008.

As accepted by GBIF and others;

- Doassansiopsidaceae (19) - only includes Doassansiopsis
- Fereydouniaceae (3) - includes Fereydounia
- Floromycetaceae (21) - includes Antherospora and Floromyces
- Glomosporiaceae (117) - includes Thecaphora (incl. Glomosporium Sorosporium)
- Mycosyringaceae (5) - includes Mycosyrinx
- Urocystidaceae (228) - includes Flamingomyces, Melanoxa, Melanustilospora, Mundkurella, Tuburcinia, Urocystis, Ustacystis and Vankya

Figures in brackets are approx. how many species per family.

Note the DNA of family Doassansiopsidaceae has been studied.

== Ecology ==
The leaves of the water-lily (Nymphaea nouchali) can be affected by the water-born fungi, Doassansiopsis nymphaea.

The leaves of Caldesia parnassifolia (Alisma reniforme) can be affected by the water-born fungi, Doassansiopsis hydrophila (A.Dietr.) Lavrov (syn Doassansiopsis martianoffiana).

== Other sources ==
- C.J. Alexopolous, Charles W. Mims, M. Blackwell et al., Introductory Mycology, 4th ed. (John Wiley and Sons, Hoboken NJ, 2004) ISBN 0-471-52229-5
