= List of Basidiomycota families =

This is a list of families in the phylum Basidiomycota of kingdom Fungi. The Basidiomycota are the second largest phyla of the fungi, containing 31515 species. The phylum is divided into three subphyla, the Pucciniomycotina (rust fungi), the Ustilaginomycotina (smut fungi), the Agaricomycotina, and two classes of uncertain taxonomic status (incertae sedis), the Wallemiomycetes and the Entorrhizomycetes. The Agaricomycotina are a diverse group that contain mushrooms, bracket fungi, puffballs, jelly fungi, and coral fungi.

Parent taxon	Family Authority	Year described	Type genus Authority
Agaricales	Agaricaceae; Chevall.	1826	Agaricus; L.
Agaricostilbales	Agaricostilbaceae; Oberw. & R. Bauer	1989	Agaricostilbum; J.E. Wright
Polyporales	Albatrellaceae; Nuss	1980	Albatrellus; Gray
Agaricales	Amanitaceae; R. Heim ex Pouzar	1983	Amanita; Pers.
Ustilaginales	Anthracoideaceae; Denchev	1997	Anthracoidea; Bref.
Cantharellales	Aphelariaceae; Corner	1970	Aphelaria; Corner
Atheliales	Atheliaceae; Jülich	1982	Athelia; Pers.
Atractiellales	Atractogloeaceae; Oberw. & R. Bauer	1989	Atractogloea; Oberw. & Bandoni
Auriculariales	Auriculariaceae; Fr.	1838	Auricularia; Bull. ex Juss.
Russulales	Auriscalpiaceae; Maas Geest.	1963	Auriscalpium; Gray
Thelephorales	Bankeraceae; Donk	1961	Bankera; Coker & Beers ex Pouzar
Agaricales	Bolbitiaceae; Singer	1948	Bolbitius; Fr.
Boletales	Boletaceae; Chevall.	1826	Boletus; L.
Boletales	Boletinellaceae; P.M. Kirk, P.F. Cannon & J.C. David	2001	Boletinellus; Murrill
Russulales	Bondarzewiaceae; Kotl. & Pouzar	1957	Bondarzewia; Singer
Cantharellales	Botryobasidiaceae; Jülich	1982	Botryobasidium; Donk
Agaricales	Broomeiaceae; Zeller	1948	Broomeia; Berk.
Cantharellales	Ceratobasidiaceae; G.W. Martin	1948	Ceratobasidium; D.P. Rogers
Pucciniales	Chaconiaceae; Cummins & Y. Hirats.	1983	Chaconia; Juel
Agaricostilbales	Chionosphaeraceae; Oberw. & Bandoni	1982	Chionosphaera; D.E. Cox
Tremellales	Carcinomycetaceae; Oberw. & Bandoni	1982	Carcinomyces; Oberw. & Bandoni
Classiculales	Classiculaceae; Bauer, Begerow, Oberw. & Marvanová	2003	Classicula; Bauer, Begerow, Oberw. & Marvanová
Phallales	Claustulaceae; G. Cunn.	1931	Claustula; K.M. Curtis
Pucciniales	Coleosporiaceae; Dietel	1900	Coleosporium; Lév.
Filobasidiales	Filobasidiaceae; L.S. Olive	1968	Filobasidium; L.S. Olive
Agaricales	Fistulinaceae; Lotsy	1907	Fistulina; Bull.
Polyporales	Fomitopsidaceae; Jülich	1982	Fomitopsis; P. Karst.
Pucciniales	Mikronegeriaceae; Cummins & Y. Hirats.	1983	Mikronegeria; Dietel
Doassansiales	Doassansiaceae; R.T. Moore ex P.M. Kirk, P.F. Cannon & J.C. David	2001	Doassansia; Cornu
Urocystidales	Doassansiopsidaceae; Begerow, R. Bauer & Oberw.	1998	Doassansiopsis (Setch.) Dietel
Pachnocybales	Pachnocybaceae; Oberw. & R. Bauer	1989	Pachnocybe; Berk.
Agaricales	Phelloriniaceae; Ulbr.	1951	Phellorinia; Berk.
Atractiellales	Phleogenaceae; Gäum.	1926	Phleogena; Link
Pucciniales	Pileolariaceae; Cummins & Y. Hirats.	1983	Pileolaria; Castagne
Platygloeales	Platygloeaceae; Racib.	1909	Platygloea; J. Schröt.
Agaricales	Pleurotaceae; Kühner	1980	Pleurotus (Fr.) P. Kumm.
Agaricales	Pluteaceae; Kotl. & Pouzar	1972	Pluteus; Fr.
Polyporales	Polyporaceae; Fr. ex Corda	1839	Polyporus; P. Micheli ex Adans.
Boletales	Protogastraceae; Zeller	1934	Protogaster; Thaxt.
Agaricales	Psathyrellaceae; Vilgalys, Moncalvo & Redhead	2001	Psathyrella (Fr.) Quél.
Agaricales	Pterulaceae; Corner	1970	Pterula; Fr.
Pucciniales	Pucciniaceae; Chevall.	1826	Puccinia; Pers.
Pucciniales	Pucciniastraceae; Gäum. ex Leppik	1972	Pucciniastrum; G.H. Otth
Pucciniales	Pucciniosiraceae; Cummins & Y. Hirats.	1983	Pucciniosira; Lagerh.
Microstromatales	Quambalariaceae; Z.W. Beer, Begerow & R. Bauer	2006	Quambalaria; J.A. Simpson
Pucciniales	Raveneliaceae; Leppik	1972	Ravenelia; Berk.
Doassansiales	Rhamphosporaceae; R. Bauer & Oberw.	1997	Rhamphospora; D.D. Cunn.
Boletales	Rhizopogonaceae; Gäum. & C.W. Dodge	1928	Rhizopogon; Fr. & Nordholm
Tremellales	Rhynchogastremataceae; Oberw. & B. Metzler	1989	Rhynchogastrema
Atractiellales	Saccoblastiaceae; Jülich	1982	Saccoblastia; A. Møller
Sebacinales	Sebacinaceae; K. Wells & Oberw.	1982	Sebacina; Tul. & C. Tul.
Russulales	Russulaceae; Lotsy	1907	Russula; Pers.
Boletales	Sclerodermataceae; Corda	1842	Scleroderma; Pers.
Boletales	Sclerogastraceae; Locq.	1974	Sclerogaster; R. Hesse
Agaricales	Schizophyllaceae; Quél.	1888	Schizophyllum; Fr.
Hymenochaetales	Schizoporaceae; Jülich	1982	Schizopora; Velen.
Septobasidiales	Septobasidiaceae; Racib.	1909	Septobasidium; Pat.
Boletales	Serpulaceae; Jarosch & Bresinsky	2001	Serpula (Pers.) Gray
Polyporales	Sparassidaceae; Herter	1910	Sparassis; Fr.
Sporidiobolales	Sporidiobolaceae; R.T. Moore	1980	Sporidiobolus; Nyland
Russulales	Stephanosporaceae; Oberw. & E. Horak	1979	Stephanospora; Pat.
Russulales	Stereaceae; Pilát	1930	Stereum; Hill ex Pers.
Agaricales	Strophariaceae; Singer & A.H. Sm.	1946	Stropharia (Fr.) Quél.
Boletales	Suillaceae; Besl & Bresinsky	1997	Suillus; Gray
Boletales	Tapinellaceae; C. Hahn	1999	Tapinella; E.-J. Gilbert
Thelephorales	Thelephoraceae; Chevall.	1826	Thelephora; Ehrh. ex Willd.
Agaricales	Tricholomataceae; R. Heim ex Pouzar	1983	Tricholoma (Fr.) Staude
Polyporales	Tubulicrinaceae; Jülich	1982	Tubulicrinis; Donk
Cantharellales	Tulasnellaceae; Juel	1897	Tulasnella; J. Schröt.
Agaricales	Typhulaceae; Jülich	1982	Typhula (Pers.) Fr.
Ustilaginales	Uleiellaceae; Vánky	2001	Uleiella; J. Schröt.
Pucciniales	Uncolaceae; Buriticá	2000	Uncol; Buriticá & Rodríguez
Urocystidales	Urocystidaceae; Begerow, R. Bauer & Oberw.	1998	Urocystis; Rabenh. ex Fuckel
Pucciniales	Uropyxidaceae; Cummins & Y. Hirats.	1983	Uropyxis; J. Schröt.
Ustilaginales	Ustilaginaceae; Tul. & C. Tul.	1847	Ustilago (Pers.) Roussel
Microbotryales	Ustilentylomataceae; R. Bauer & Oberw.	1997	Ustilentyloma; Savile
Polyporales	Xenasmataceae; Oberw.	1966	Xenasma; Donk
Microstromatales	Volvocisporiaceae; Begerow, R. Bauer & Oberw.	2001	Volvocisporium; Begerow, R. Bauer & Oberw.
Wallemiales	Wallemiaceae; R.T. Moore	1996	Wallemia; Johan-Olsen
Ustilaginales	Websdaneaceae; Vánky	2001	Websdanea; Vánky
Tremellales	Trichosporonaceae; Nann.	1934	Trichosporon; Behrend
Tremellales	Tetragoniomycetaceae; Oberw. & Bandoni	1981	Tetragoniomyces; Oberw. & Bandoni
Pucciniales	Phragmidiaceae; Corda	1837	Phragmidium; Link
Tremellales	Phragmoxenidiaceae; Oberw. & R. Bauer	1990	Phragmoxenidium; Oberw.
Pucciniales	Phakopsoraceae; Cummins & Hirats. f.	1983	Phakopsora; Dietel
Phallales	Phallaceae; Corda	1842	Phallus; Junius ex L.
Hysterangiales	Phallogastraceae; Locq.	1974	Phallogaster; Morgan
Polyporales	Phanerochaetaceae; Jülich	1982	Phanerochaete; P. Karst.
Agaricales	Physalacriaceae; Corner	1970	Physalacria; Peck
Russulales	Peniophoraceae; Lotsy	1907	Peniophora; Cooke
Agaricales	Niaceae; Jülich	1982	Nia; R.T. Moore & Meyers
Urocystidales	Mycosyringaceae; R. Bauer & Oberw.	1997	Mycosyrinx; Beck
Agaricales	Mycenaceae; Roze	1876	Mycena (Pers.) Roussel
Mixiales	Mixiaceae; C.L. Kramer	1987	Mixia; C.L. Kramer
Microstromatales	Microstromataceae; Jülich	1982	Microstroma; Niessl
Microbotryales	Microbotryaceae; R.T. Moore	1996	Microbotryum; Lév.
Hysterangiales	Mesophelliaceae; Jülich	1982	Mesophellia; Berk.
Polyporales	Meruliaceae; P. Karst.	1881	Merulius; Fr.
Polyporales	Meripilaceae; Jülich	1982	Meripilus; P. Karst.
Ustilaginales	Melanotaeniaceae; Begerow, R. Bauer & Oberw.	1998	Melanotaenium de Bary
Doassansiales	Melaniellaceae; R. Bauer, Vánky, Begerow & Oberw.	1999	Melaniella; R. Bauer, Vánky, Begerow & Oberw.
Pucciniales	Melampsoraceae; Dietel	1897	Melampsora; Castagne
Agaricales	Marasmiaceae; Roze ex Kühner	1980	Marasmius; Fr.
Polyporales	Limnoperdaceae; G.A. Escobar	1976	Limnoperdon; G.A. Escobar
Agaricales	Lyophyllaceae; Jülich	1982	Lyophyllum; P. Karst.
Leucosporidiales	Leucosporidiaceae; Jülich	1982	Leucosporidium; Fell, Statzell, I.L. Hunter & Phaff
Gomphales	Lentariaceae; Jülich	1982	Lentaria; Corner
Russulales	Lachnocladiaceae; D.A. Reid	1965	Lachnocladium; Lév.
Agaricostilbales	Kondoaceae; R. Bauer, Begerow, J.P. Samp., M. Weiss & Oberw.	2006	Kondoa; Y. Yamada, Nakagawa & I. Banno
Agaricales	Inocybaceae; Jülich	1982	Inocybe (Fr.) Fr.
Hysterangiales	Hysterangiaceae; E. Fisch.	1899	Hysterangium; Vittad.
Hymenochaetales	Hymenochaetaceae; Imazeki & Toki	1954	Hymenochaete; Lév.
Russulales	Hybogasteraceae; Jülich	1982	Hybogaster; Singer
Cantharellales	Hydnaceae; Chevall.	1826	Hydnum; L.
Agaricales	Hydnangiaceae; Gäum. & C.W. Dodge	1928	Hydnangium; Wallr.
Agaricales	Hygrophoraceae; Lotsy	1907	Hygrophorus; Fr.
Boletales	Hygrophoropsidaceae; Kühner	1980	Hygrophoropsis (J. Schröt.) Maire ex Martin-Sans
Tremellales	Hyaloriaceae; Lindau	1897	Hyaloria; A. Möller
Heterogastridiales	Heterogastridiaceae; Oberw. & R. Bauer	1990	Heterogastridium; Oberw. & R. Bauer
Russulales	Hericiaceae; Donk	1964	Hericium; Pers.
Agaricales	Hemigasteraceae; Gäum. & C.W. Dodge	1928	Hemigaster; Juel
Helicobasidiales	Helicobasidiaceae; P.M. Kirk	2008	Helicobasidium
Boletales	Gyroporaceae; Locq.	1984	Gyroporus; Quél.
Exobasidiales	Graphiolaceae; Clem. & Shear	1931	Graphiola; Poit.
Polyporales	Grammotheleaceae; Jülich	1982	Grammothele; Berk. & M.A. Curtis
Gomphales	Gomphaceae; Donk	1961	Gomphus; Pers.
Boletales	Gomphidiaceae; Maire ex Jülich	1982	Gomphidius; Fr.
Urocystidales	Glomosporiaceae; Cif.	1963	Glomosporium; Kochman
Gloeophyllales	Gloeophyllaceae; Jülich	1982	Gloeophyllum; P. Karst.
Georgefischeriales	Gjaerumiaceae; R. Bauer, M. Lutz & Oberw.	2005	Gjaerumia; R. Bauer, M. Lutz & Oberw.
Georgefischeriales	Georgefischeriaceae; R. Bauer, Begerow & Oberw.	1997	Georgefischeria; Thirum. & Naras.
Georgefischeriales	Geosiphonaceae; Engl. & E. Gilg	1924	Geosiphon; F. Wettst.
Hysterangiales	Gallaceaceae; Locq.	1974	Gallacea; Lloyd
Polyporales	Ganodermataceae; Donk	1948	Ganoderma; P. Karst.
Boletales	Gasterellaceae; Zeller	1948	Gasterella; Zeller & L.B. Walker
Boletales	Gastrosporiaceae; Pilát	1934	Gastrosporium; Mattir.
Geastrales	Geastraceae; Corda	1842	Geastrum; Pers.
Ustilaginales	Geminaginaceae; Vánky	2001	Geminago; Vánky & R. Bauer
Exobasidiales	Exobasidiaceae; J. Schröt.	1888	Exobasidium; Woronin
Entorrhizales	Entorrhizaceae; R. Bauer & Oberw.	1997	Entorrhiza; C.A. Weber
Entylomatales	Entylomataceae; R. Bauer & Oberw.	1997	Entyloma de Bary
Agaricales	Entolomataceae; Kotl. & Pouzar	1972	Entoloma (Fr.) P. Kumm
Georgefischeriales	Eballistraceae; R. Bauer, Begerow, A. Nagler & Oberw.	2001	Eballistra; R. Bauer, Begerow, A. Nagler & Oberw.
Russulales	Echinodontiaceae; Donk	1961	Echinodontium; Ellis & Everh.
Agaricales	Cyphellaceae; Lotsy	1907	Cyphella; Fr.
Cystobasidiales	Cystobasidiaceae; Gäum.	1926	Cystobasidium (Lagerh.) Neuhoff
Cystofilobasidiales	Cystofilobasidiaceae; Well & Bandoni	2001	Cystofilobasidium; Oberw. & Bandoni
Polyporales	Cystostereaceae; Jülich	1982	Cystostereum; Pouzar
Tremellales	Cuniculitremaceae; J.P. Samp., R. Kirschner & M. Weiss	2001	Cuniculitrema; J.P. Samp. & R. Kirschner
Dacrymycetales	Dacrymycetaceae; J. Schröt.	1888	Dacrymyces; Nees
Cryptomycocolacales	Cryptomycocolacaceae; Oberw. & R. Bauer	1990	Cryptomycocolax; Oberw. & R. Bauer
Exobasidiales	Cryptobasidiaceae; Malençon ex Donk	1956	Cryptobasidium; Lendn.
Pucciniales	Cronartiaceae; Dietel	1900	Cronartium; Fr.
Corticiales	Corticiaceae; Herter	1910	Corticium; Pers.
Agaricales	Cortinariaceae; R. Heim	1934	Cortinarius
Boletales	Coniophoraceae; Ulbr.	1928	Coniophora; DC.
Cantharellales	Clavulinaceae; Donk	1970	Clavulina; J. Schröt.
Ustilaginales	Clintamraceae; Vánky	2001	Clintamra; Cordas & Durán
Gomphales	Clavariadelphaceae; Corner	1970	Clavariadelphus; Donk
Ustilaginales	Cintractiellaceae; Vánky	2003	Cintractiella; Boedijn
Cantharellales	Cantharellaceae; J. Schröt.	1888	Cantharellus; Adans. ex Fr.
Exobasidiales	Brachybasidiaceae; Gäum.	1926	Brachybasidium; Gäum.
