= Papiliotrema mangaliensis =

Scientific classification
- Domain: Eukaryota
- Kingdom: Fungi
- Division: Basidiomycota
- Class: Tremellomycetes
- Order: Tremellales
- Family: Rhynchogastremaceae
- Genus: Papiliotrema
- Species: P. mangaliensis

Binomial name
- Papiliotrema mangaliensis (Fell, Statzell & Scorzetti) A.M. Yurkov (2015)

Synonyms
- Cryptococcus mangaliensis

Species of fungus

Papiliotrema mangaliensis (synonym Cryptococcus mangaliensis) is a fungal species in the family Rhynchogastremataceae. The species was first found in its yeast state in the Florida Everglades.
