= Stilbum (fungus) =

Scientific classification
- Kingdom: Fungi
- Division: Basidiomycota
- Class: Agaricostilbomycetes
- Order: Agaricostilbales
- Family: Chionosphaeraceae
- Genus: Stilbum; Tode (1790)

Type species
- Stilbum vulgare Tode (1790)

Genus of fungi

Stilbum is a genus of fungi in the family Chionosphaeraceae. Though many species were formerly referred to the genus, it is effectively monotypic since the type species, Stilbum vulgare, currently has no close relative. Stilbum vulgare forms groups of minute, gelatinous, synnema-like basidiocarps (fruit bodies) up to 0.5 mm tall with a distinct stem and inflated, fertile head. Microscopically, it produces auricularioid (laterally septate) basidia and basidiospores that germinate by budding off yeast cells. The species has been collected on rotting wood and old agaric fruit bodies and may be a parasite of other fungi. It was originally described from Europe, but is also known from Asia, North America, and Australia.

== Taxonomy ==
Stilbum was described in 1790 by German mycologist Heinrich Julius Tode. As well as Stilbum vulgare, he included several other species of similar size, texture, and shape within the genus. In the following century, other authors added over 200 species to Stilbum on the same basis. Re-examination of specimens in the twentieth century showed, however, that nearly all these species were anamorphic members of the Ascomycota, many of them subsequently assigned to the genus Stilbella. Some species originally described in the genus Stilbum remain unassigned and are treated as nomina dubia since authentic material is lacking and the original descriptions are inadequate for identification.
