= Exoteliospora =

Scientific classification
- Kingdom: Fungi
- Division: Basidiomycota
- Class: Ustilaginomycetes
- Order: Ustilaginales
- Family: Melanotaeniaceae
- Genus: Exoteliospora; R. Bauer, Oberw. & Vánky 1999

Type species
- Exoteliospora osmundae (Peck) R. Bauer, Oberw. & Vánky 1999

Synonyms
- Ustilago osmundae Peck, Bot. Gaz. 6(10): 276 (1881); Mycosyrinx osmundae (Peck) Sacc. & Trotter, Syll. fung. (Abellini) 23: 615 (1925); Ustilago osmundae var. cinnamomeae Peck, Bull. N.Y. St. Mus. 157: 43 (1912); Mycosyrinx osmundae var. cinnamomeae (Peck) Sacc. & Trotter [as 'osmundae-cinnamomeae'], Syll. fung. (Abellini) 23: 615 (1925)

Genus of fungi

The Exoteliospora is a monotypic, genus of smut fungi in the family Melanotaeniaceae which contains the single species Exoteliospora osmundae.

The species found on the fronds of Osmunda regalis in Vermont, USA was originally described and published as Ustilago osmundae by American mycologist Peck in 1881, before being renamed in 1999 by R. Bauer, Oberw. & Vánky.
