= Alveolaria =

Alveolaria may refer to:

- Alveolaria (bryozoan), a fossil genus of bryozoans in the family Cerioporidae
- Alveolaria (fungus), a genus of funguses in the family Pucciniosiraceae
- Alveolaria, a genus of polychaetes in the family Sabellariidae, synonym of Sabellaria
