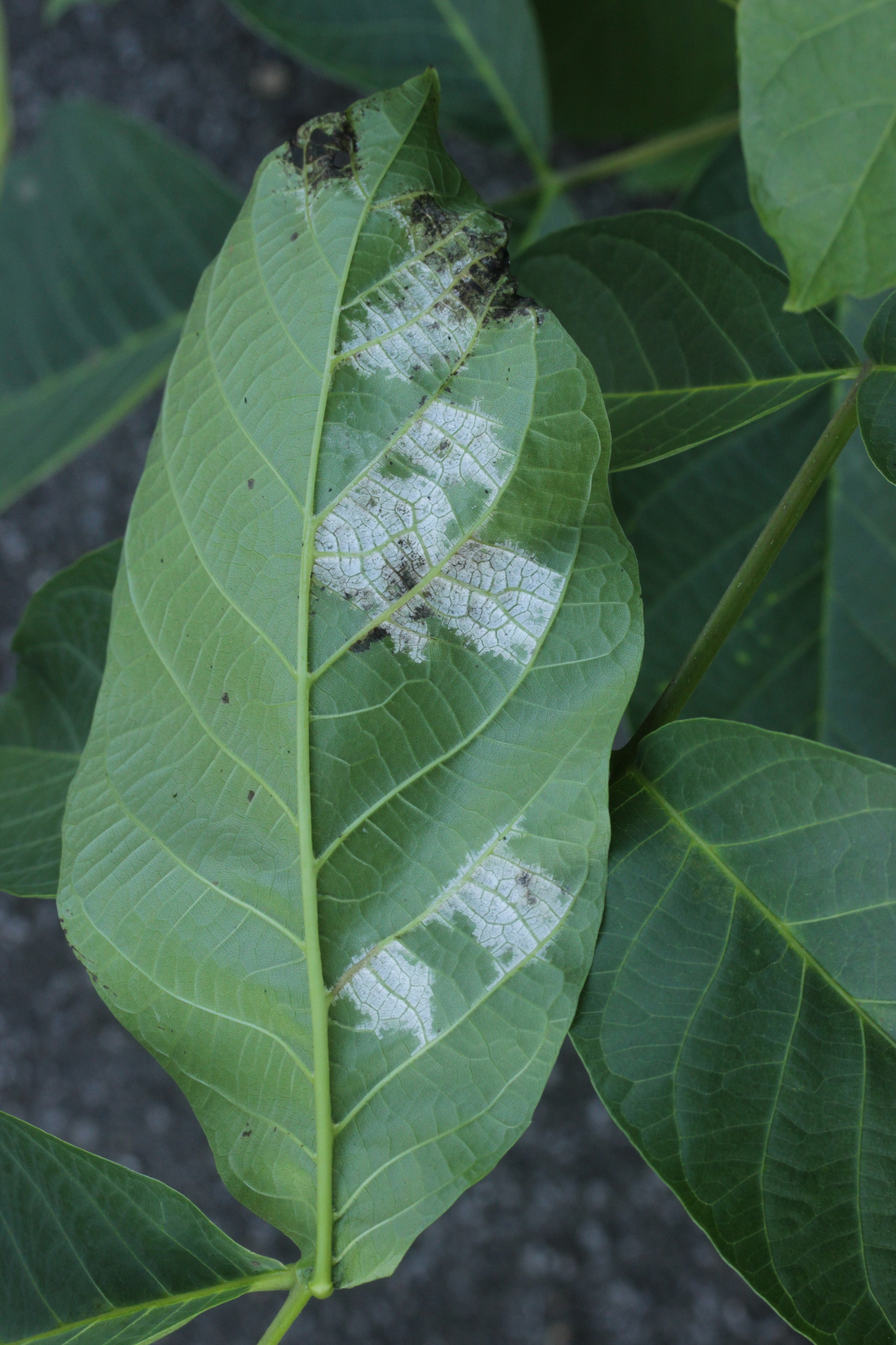
- Pseudomicrostroma juglandis on a walnut leaf

Scientific classification
- Kingdom: Fungi
- Division: Basidiomycota
- Class: Exobasidiomycetes
- Order: Microstromatales
- Family: Microstromataceae
- Genus: Pseudomicrostroma
- Species: P. juglandis

Binomial name
- Pseudomicrostroma juglandis (Berenger) Sacc. (1886)

Synonyms
- Microstroma juglandis; Fusidium juglandis Berenger (1847)

= Pseudomicrostroma juglandis =

Species of fungus

Pseudomicrostroma juglandis is a plant pathogen.
