= Melanotaenium =

Scientific classification
- Kingdom: Fungi
- Division: Basidiomycota
- Class: Ustilaginomycetes
- Order: Ustilaginales
- Family: Melanotaeniaceae
- Genus: Melanotaenium de Bary 1874

Genus of fungi

The Melanotaenium is a genus of smut fungi in the family Melanotaeniaceae.

It includes species such as smut fungus Melanotaenium cingens (Beck) Magnus which was found parasitizing Linaria genistifolia (L.) Mill. (Plantaginaceae family) on Chornomorsky (Tendra Island, Kherson Oblast, Ukraine) in 2007.

== Species ==
As accepted by Species Fungorum;

- Melanotaenium adoxae (Bref.) S. Ito (1935)
- Melanotaenium antirrhini Vienn.-Bourg. ex Vánky (1990)
- Melanotaenium apludae Thirum. & M.C. Sriniv. (1964)
- Melanotaenium arthraxonis (Thirum. & Pavgi) Vánky (1997)
- Melanotaenium arundinellae M.S. Patil (1992)
- Melanotaenium byzovae Schwarzman (1960)
- Melanotaenium cingens (Beck) Magnus (1892)
- Melanotaenium dimeriae A.R. Patil, T.M. Patil & M.S. Patil (2004)
- Melanotaenium echinochloae M.S. Patil (1992)
- Melanotaenium endogenum (Unger) de Bary (1874)
- Melanotaenium eragrostidis A.R. Patil, T.M. Patil & M.S. Patil (2004)
- Melanotaenium euphorbiae (L.W. Lenz) M.D. Whitehead & Thirum. (1953)
- Melanotaenium gunnerae G.P. Clinton ex Vánky & R. Bauer (1998)
- Melanotaenium hypogaeum (Tul. & C. Tul.) Schellenb. (1911)
- Melanotaenium jaapii Magnus (1911)
- Melanotaenium metzii A.R. Patil, T.M. Patil & M.S. Patil (2004)
- Melanotaenium spermacoces Thirum., Patel, G.W. Dhande & V.V. Bhatt (1956)
- Melanotaenium tochinaianum S. Ito (1935)
- Melanotaenium tuberculatae M.S. Patil (1992)
- Melanotaenium urochloae M.S. Patil (1992)
