= Yelsemia =

Scientific classification
- Kingdom: Fungi
- Division: Basidiomycota
- Class: Ustilaginomycetes
- Order: Ustilaginales
- Family: Melanotaeniaceae
- Genus: Yelsemia; J. Walker, 2001

Genus of fungi

Yelsemia is a genus of smut fungi in the family Melanotaeniaceae, containing four species.

The genus was originally placed in the Tilletiales order, due to the germination of the spores of Yelsemia arthropodii had similar characteristics of the fungal species in the Tilletiales order. before moving to Melanotaeniacea family in the Ustilaginales order.

== Hosts ==
It was found that species Yelsemia arthropodii infects plant species of Arthropodium and also in the Dichopogon genera (both in the Anthericaceae family) in Australia. Also Yelsemia speculariae infects plant species of Triodanis (from the Campanulaceae family) from North America. Then Yelsemia lowrieana was found as small pustales on a carnivorous plant in Australia, Byblis rorida.

== Species ==
As accepted by Species Fungorum;

- Yelsemia arthropodii J. Walker (2001)
- Yelsemia droserae R.G. Shivas, Vánky & Athip. (2006)
- Yelsemia lowrieana R.G. Shivas & Vánky (2003)
- Yelsemia speculariae (J.A. Stev.) Vánky & R. Bauer (2002)

== Other sources ==
- Kálmán Vánky, Smut fungi of the world, 2012, American Phytopathological Society, ISBN 978-0-89054-398-6
