= Websdaneaceae =

Scientific classification
- Kingdom: Fungi
- Division: Basidiomycota
- Class: Ustilaginomycetes
- Order: Ustilaginales
- Family: Websdaneaceae; Vánky (2001)

Type genus
- Websdanea Vánky (1997)

Family of fungi

The Websdaneaceae are a family of smut fungi in the class Ustilaginomycetes. Collectively, the family contains 2 genera and 22 species.

== Taxonomy ==
As accepted by Wijayawardene et al. 2020;

- Restiosporium Vánky (21)
- Websdanea Vánky (1)
