= Ruineniaceae =

Scientific classification
- Kingdom: Fungi
- Division: Basidiomycota
- Class: Agaricostilbomycetes
- Order: Agaricostilbales
- Family: Ruineniaceae; Q.M. Wang, F.Y. Bai, M. Groenew. & Boekhout (2016)

Type genus
- Ruinenia Q.M. Wang, F.Y. Bai, M. Groenew. & Boekhout (2016)

Genera
- Ruinenia

Order of fungi

Ruineniaceae is a family of fungi in the order Agaricostilbales. The family contains a single genus. Species are known only from their yeast states.
