= L-lysine-lactamase =

Class of enzymes

Identifiers
- EC no.: 3.5.2.11
- CAS no.: 52652-61-6

Databases
- BRENDA: enzyme data
- ExPASy: NiceZyme view
- KEGG: enzyme entry
- MetaCyc: metabolic pathway
- Rhea: reactions
- PDB structures: RCSB PDB PDBe PDBsum
- Gene Ontology: AmiGO / QuickGO
Search
- PMC: articles
- PubMed: articles
- NCBI: proteins

L-lysine-lactamase (EC 3.5.2.11) is an enzyme characterised from Cryptococcus laurentii that catalyzes the hydrolysis of L-lysine 1,6-lactam to the amino acid, L-lysine:

L-lysine 1,6-lactam
H_{2}O
L-lysine

This enzyme is a hydrolase, one acting on carbon-nitrogen bonds other than peptide bonds, specifically in cyclic amides. The systematic name of this enzyme class is L-lysine-1,6-lactam lactamhydrolase. Other names in common use include L-alpha-aminocaprolactam hydrolase, and L-lysinamidase.
