= Limnoperdon =

Scientific classification
- Kingdom: Fungi
- Division: Basidiomycota
- Class: Agaricomycetes
- Order: Agaricales
- Family: Limnoperdaceae; G.A.Escobar (1976)
- Genus: Limnoperdon; G.A.Escobar (1976)

Type species
- Limnoperdon incarnatum G.A.Escobar (1976)

Genus of fungi

Limnoperdon is a fungal genus in the monotypic family Limnoperdaceae. The genus is also monotypic, as it contains a single species, the aquatic fungus Limnoperdon incarnatum. The species, described as new to science in 1976, produces fruit bodies that lack specialized structures such as a stem, cap and gills common in mushrooms. Rather, the fruit bodies—described as aquatic or floating puffballs—are small balls (0.5–1 mm diameter) of loosely interwoven hyphae. The balls float on the surface of the water above submerged twigs. Experimental observations on the development of the fruit body, based on the growth on the fungus in pure culture, suggest that a thin strand of mycelium tethers the ball above water while it matures. Fruit bodies start out as a tuft of hyphae, then become cup-shaped, and eventually enclose around a single chamber that contains reddish spores. Initially discovered in a marsh in the state of Washington, the fungus has since been collected in Japan, South Africa, and Canada.

== Taxonomy, classification and phylogeny ==
The family, genus and species were first described in a 1976 publication by graduate students Gustavo Escobar and Dennis McCabe, and undergraduate Craig Harpel who, in the fall of 1974, found the fungus as part of "a class project to find and isolate phycomycetes". The holotype is located in the University of Washington Mycological Herbarium. An isotype (duplicate of the holotype specimen) is located in the Herbarium of the University of El Salvador in San Salvador.

- - - - - Pluteaceae
          - - - Pluteus petasatus
              - P. romellii
            - P. atromarginatus
          - Volvopluteus gloiocephalus
        - Tricholomataceae
          Melanoleuca verrucipes
    - Limnoperdaceae
      L. incarnatum

Cladogram indicating phylogeny of L. incarnatum and some related species in the Pluteoid clade, based on ribosomal DNA sequences; after Matheny et al., 2006:

Limnoperdon incarnatum was originally thought to be associated with the Gasteromycetes, an artificial assemblage of species united by the fact that their spores mature inside the fruit bodies and are not forcibly discharged from the basidia. Other morphologically similar genera include the Gasterella of the family Gasterellaceae, and the Protogaster of the family Protogastraceae; however, it was excluded from these genera because of significant differences in spore color and structure, presence of clamp connections, and structure of the basidia. For these reasons the new family Limnoperdaceae was described to contain the new species, and it was classified along the Protogastraceae in the (now defunct) order Protogastrales. More recently, molecular phylogenetics has been used to clarify the relationship Limnoperdon with other fungi. In 2001, David Hibbett and Manfred Binder established the membership of Limnoperdon incarnatum in the euagarics clade, a phylogenetically related group of species traditionally forming the order Agaricales. Additional molecular studies have placed Limnoperdaceae in the pluteoid clade of the Agaricales, a grouping that includes the families Pluteaceae, Amanitaceae, and Pleurotaceae; other studies that used comparisons of ribosomal DNA sequences placed Limnoperdon near the gilled genera Melanoleuca or Resupinatus, of the family Tricholomataceae.

A 2007 field study that used molecular techniques to survey aquatic fungal taxa in a small springbrook in Valley Spring, Southern Ontario, Canada discovered many fungal taxa with high genetic affinity to Limnoperdon incarnatum, which suggests that a closely related species may also be common in streams.

== Description ==
Family description:

"Fructifications almost spherical, minute; peridium complex, with dendrophyses, indehiscent; gleba uniloculate, without invaginations; hymenium smooth; spores smooth."

— Escobar, 1976

The genus description is similar to the family description, but further specifies that the fruit bodies float, are sometimes embedded in a loose subiculum (a woolly or net-like growth of hyphae), and that the spores are reddish. The fungus has been described as an "aquatic puffball", although a later review considered "floating puffball" to be a more apt descriptor.

The fruit bodies of L. incarnatum are tiny, oval to roughly spherical, and measure 35–1250 by 200–450 μm. The floating balls are sometimes enclosed in a loose subiculum, with a whitish surface that is byssoid (consisting of fine threads). The peridium (the outer protective tissue layer) is 18–30 μm thick, byssoid, and made of clamped hyphae typically 2.5–4 μm in diameter intertwined with dendrophyses (irregularly branched cystidia) 1 μm in diameter. The surface of the peridium is hydrophobic, a feature that helps keep water off the growing hymenium during its development, and gives the fruit body buoyancy.

The gleba is a single chamber, reddish in color, with a cavity that has an oblate spheroid shape. Initially empty, in maturity it is filled with spores that measure 330–1220 by 180–420 μm. The smooth inner surface of the chamber comprises the fertile spore-bearing tissue (the hymenium). The basidia (spore-bearing cells)—conspicuous when viewed under the microscope—are hyaline (translucent), more or less club-shaped, and usually have basal and apical swellings separated by a narrow strip of variable length. The basidia are four-spored, and have inflated sterigmata with a central constriction. The basidia measure 20–90 (typically 25–55) μm long by 8–10 μm thick. Reddish in mass, the spores are obovate (egg-shaped, with the broad extremity located away from the base), smooth, thick-walled, and measure 11–16 (typically 12–15) by 7–10 μm. They have a beaked pedicel that is 2–4 by 2–5 μm, and a basal germ pore.

== Habitat and distribution ==
The species was originally discovered floating in petri dishes that contained submerged hardwood twigs previously collected from a marsh next to a playground on the south shore of Lake Union in Seattle, Washington. After the initial 1976 publication, L. incarnatum was reported the following year when Keisuke Tubaki recovered it from wood blocks submerged in brackish water in Japan; scientists Seiya Ito and T. Yokoyama later reported collecting it in Japanese rice paddy fields. Later surveys uncovered the fungus in several localities in South Africa and in freshwater ponds in Canada.

== Development ==
Escobar grew cultures of the fungus by placing fresh fruit bodies on agar containing growth medium with an extract of horse dung. The tips of the hyphae were used to obtain axenic cultures; the fungus can grow on a variety of media commonly used to grow fungi in the laboratory. Depending on the composition of the growth media, fruit bodies were formed as early as eight days after initiating, when grown at 20 °C (68 °F) and under dim light. When minute agar blocks containing mycelium were submerged in distilled water, mycelial strands grew towards the water surface and eventually gave rise to floating fruit bodies connected to the parent agar block by strands of hyphae.

Mycologist Dennis McCabe studied the development of the fruit body using specimens grown in pure culture. Starting out as a hyphal tuft, the fungus grows into a cup shape before eventually closing in completely to create the spherical structure of the mature fruit body. When the fungus is in the cup stage, the exposed hymenium is immature; typically, spores develop after the fruit body is fully closed. In some cases, the fruit body stops developing at the cup stage while the hymenium continues to mature. This results in a cup-shaped fungus with an exposed layer of basidia bearing normal and mature spores. Limnoperdon incarnatum is a structurally simple fungus, and relatively easy to grow in culture, suggesting it may have potential as a model organism for fruit body development in general. Under the experimental conditions used, fruit bodies matured to produce spores about 72 hours after the fungus started growing. The aborted cups resemble the sporocarps of the cyphelloid fungi, but can be distinguished by their orthotrophic spore attachment and the lack of ballistospory (forceful spore discharge). McCabe and Escobar later suggested that the fungus may have evolved the loss of ballistospory by being compensated with the cup-shaped fruit body closing at maturity. Halocyphina villosa is another small cup-shaped Basidiomycete fungus that has adapted to a marine environment; in contrast to L. incarnatum, however, it starts out with a closed fruit body that later opens up to become cup-shaped.

Although it is not known with certainty how the spores are dispersed, they may disperse passively in the water, or a mature spore-containing fruit body may float on the water surface for dispersal. L. incarnatum is homothallic, a mode of reproduction commonly employed by marine fungi that may confer a competitive advantage in marine environments.

== See also ==
- List of Agaricales families
- List of Agaricales genera
