= Uleiellaceae =

Scientific classification
- Kingdom: Fungi
- Division: Basidiomycota
- Class: Ustilaginomycetes
- Order: Ustilaginales
- Family: Uleiellaceae; Vánky (2001)

Type species
- Uleiella paradoxa J.Schröt. (1894)

Family of fungi

The Uleiellaceae are a family of smut fungi in the order Ustilaginomycetes. The family contains the single genus Uleiella, which has two species.

The genus was circumscribed by Joseph Schröter in Hedwigia vol.33 Beibl.: 65 in 1894.

The genus name of Uleiella is in honour of Ernst Heinrich Georg Ule (1854–1915), who was a German botanist and plant collector.

== Species ==
As accepted by Species Fungorum;

- Uleiella chilensis Dietel & Neger (1899)
- Uleiella paradoxa J. Schröt. (1894)
