= Chionosphaera =

Scientific classification
- Domain: Eukaryota
- Kingdom: Fungi
- Division: Basidiomycota
- Class: Agaricostilbomycetes
- Order: Agaricostilbales
- Family: Chionosphaeraceae
- Genus: Chionosphaera; D.E.Cox (1976)

Type species
- Chionosphaera apobasidialis D.E.Cox (1976)

Species
- C. apobasidialis C. cuniculicola C. erythrinae C. phylaciicola

Synonyms
- Fibulostilbum Seifert & Oberw. (1992)

Genus of lichens

Chionosphaera is a genus of fungi in the family Chionosphaeraceae. It has four species.

== Taxonomy ==
The genus was circumscribed by the mycologist Darrell Cox in 1976. He assigned Chionosphaera apobasidialis as the type species. Cox discovered this fungus after incubating dead bur oak tree branches (collected in Illinois) in a moist chamber for a few days and observing the resulting tiny white fruiting bodies emerging between the cracks of the bark. The genus name, which combines the Greek chion ('snow') with sphaira ('ball'), refers to the form of the fungus's glistening white fruiting body, which Cox described as a "tiny stalked snowball" when viewed under a microscope.

Cox suggested classifying Chionosphaera in the Filobasidiaceae, and proposed emending the description of this family to accommodate this inclusion. Instead, in 1982 the mycologists Franz Oberwinkler and Robert Bandoni proposed the family Chionosphaeraceae, with Chionosphaera as the type genus.

== Description ==
Chionosphaera apobasidialis produces tiny, white, club-shaped structures known as synnemata on the bark of dead branches from trees like bur oak (Quercus macrocarpa), post oak (Q. stellata), and American hornbeam (Carpinus caroliniana). These structures look similar to those produced by certain types of imperfect fungi (fungi that do not have a known sexual stage) and some other basidiomycetes (a group of fungi that includes mushrooms).

In laboratory conditions, Chionosphaera apobasidialis can complete its life cycle on various types of growth media. Its spores, called basidiospores, germinate by budding—a process where a new cell forms directly from the parent cell. The fungus requires two different mating types (heterothallic) to reproduce sexually. It only forms its fruiting bodies in the lab when grown alongside another fungus, such as a species of Cladosporium or a similar mold.

The basidia (spore-producing cells) of Chionosphaera are a special type known as apobasidia, which are more commonly found in gasteromycetes (a group of fungi that includes puffballs) but are unique in this context among the hymenomycetes, a large group that includes most mushroom-forming fungi.

== Species ==
- Chionosphaera apobasidialis D.E.Cox (1976)
- Chionosphaera cuniculicola R.Kirschner, Begerow & Oberw. (2001)
- Chionosphaera erythrinae (Hansf.) R.Kirschner (2008)
- Chionosphaera phylaciicola (Seifert & Bandoni) R.Kirschner & Oberw. (2001)

Two lichenicolous (lichen-dwelling) former members of the genus (C. coppinsii and C. lichenicola) were transferred to the genus Crittendenia in 2021.
