= Jianyuniaceae =

Scientific classification
- Kingdom: Fungi
- Division: Basidiomycota
- Class: Agaricostilbomycetes
- Order: Agaricostilbales
- Family: Jianyuniaceae; Q.M. Wang & F.Y. Bai (2020)

Type genus
- Jianyunia Q.M. Wang, F.Y. Bai, M. Groenew. & Boekhout (2016)

Genera
- Jianyunia; Pseudosterigmatospora; Sterigmatospora

Order of fungi

Jianyuniaceae is a family of fungi in the order Agaricostilbales. The family contains three genera. Species are known only from their yeast states.
