= Pericladium =

Scientific classification
- Kingdom: Fungi
- Division: Basidiomycota
- Class: Ustilaginomycetes
- Order: Ustilaginales
- Family: Pericladiaceae; Vánky (2011)
- Genus: Pericladium; Pass. (1875)

Type species
- Pericladium grewiae Pass. (1875)

Genus of fungi

Pericladium is a genus of smut fungi in the monotypic family Pericladiaceae in the order Ustilaginales.

== Species ==
As accepted by Species Fungorum;

- Pericladium grewiae Pass. (1875)
- Pericladium piperis (Zundel) Mundk. (1944)
- Pericladium tiliacearum Mundk. & Thirum. (1950)

Former species P. flavesci Prasad & Tyagi (1961) = Pericladium grewiae
