= Melanotaeniaceae =

Scientific classification
- Kingdom: Fungi
- Division: Basidiomycota
- Class: Ustilaginomycetes
- Order: Ustilaginales
- Family: Melanotaeniaceae

Type species
- Melanotaenium de Bary 1874

Genera
- Exoteliospora (1 species); Melanotaenium (9); Yelsemia (4)

Family of fungi

The Melanotaeniaceae are a family of smut fungi in the order Ustilaginomycetes, containing three genera.

It includes species such as smut fungus Melanotaenium cingens which was found parasitizing Linaria genistifolia (Plantaginaceae family) on Chornomorsky (Tendra Island, Kherson Oblast, Ukraine) in 2007.
