= Crittendenia =

Scientific classification
- Kingdom: Fungi
- Division: Basidiomycota
- Class: Agaricostilbomycetes
- Order: Agaricostilbales
- Family: Crittendeniaceae; Millanes, Diederich & Wedin (2022)
- Genus: Crittendenia; Diederich, Millanes, M.Westb., Etayo, J.C.Zamora & Wedin (2021)

Type species
- Crittendenia coppinsii (P.Roberts) Diederich, M.Westb., Millanes & Wedin (2021)

Genus of fungi

Crittendenia is a genus of lichenicolous (lichen-dwelling) fungi in the monogeneric family Crittendeniaceae. The genus was circumscribed in 2021 to contain two species, C. lichenicola, and the type, C. coppinsii; these species were previously classified in the genus Chionosphaera. An additional 16 species were added to the genus the following year. The genus name honours British lichenologist Peter Crittenden.

Characteristics of Crittendenia include the tiny synnemata-like basidiomata, clamp connections, and aseptate tubular basidia from which 4–7 spores discharge passively, often in groups. The genus was originally considered to be of uncertain classification in the Agaricostilbomycetes; the family Crittendeniaceae was proposed in 2022 to contain the genus following molecular phylogenetic investigation.

== Description ==
The genus Crittendenia comprises lichenicolous fungi, which are fungi that grow on lichens. Members of this genus typically produce their own thallus that varies in form and colour. In some species, the thallus is minimal, while in others it spreads extensively over the host lichen. The thallus can be flat or rounded, ranging in colour from translucent white to shades of brown, often appearing darker than the host lichen. Its texture is strongly gelatinous and translucent, and it frequently contains other microorganisms such as bacteria, cyanobacteria, and yeast-like cells. In certain specimens, algal cells are present, giving the thallus the appearance of a basic, lichenised structure. However, this thallus is not visibly parasitic and in one species, it forms over galls (abnormal growths on the host). The reproductive structures of Crittendenia, the basidiomata, develop on lichens and are stalked and club-shaped, resembling small fruiting bodies. These structures have a fleshy, waxy texture and come in colours such as whitish, pale brown, pink, or orange, often with a slightly translucent appearance. The top of the basidioma (capitulum) is generally distinct and sometimes enlarged.

The stalk (stipe) of the basidioma is composed of parallel fungal filaments (hyphae), which are rarely branched and have few internal partitions (septa). These hyphae give rise to specialised spore-producing cells called basidia. The basidia are tubular, with their widest point near the tip, and can produce 1–8 spores at their apex. These spores are short to elongate, ellipsoid or spindle-shaped, and translucent (hyaline). As the spores mature, their walls may develop a rough, outer layer that eventually detaches, leaving behind a smaller, smooth-walled spore. The spores are released in clusters and do not forcibly eject from the basidia.

Although Crittendenia has no known asexual reproductive stage, yeast-like cells are often observed in its basidiomata and the surrounding host lichen tissue. These cells are significantly smaller than the basidiospores, but their relationship to the fungus remains unclear.

== Species ==
- Crittendenia absistentis Diederich, Coppins & Millanes (2022)
- Crittendenia bacidinae Diederich, van den Boom & Millanes (2022)
- Crittendenia bryostigmatis Diederich & Tønsberg (2022)
- Crittendenia byssolomatis Diederich, van den Boom & Millanes (2022)
- Crittendenia coppinsii (P.Roberts) Diederich, M.Westb., Millanes & Wedin (2021)
- Crittendenia crassitunicata Diederich & Etayo (2022)
- Crittendenia heterodermiae Diederich, Etayo & Millanes (2022)
- Crittendenia hypotrachynae Diederich, Etayo, van den Boom & Millanes (2022)
- Crittendenia kakouettae Diederich, van den Boom & Millanes (2022)
- Crittendenia lecanorae Diederich & Etayo (2022)
- Crittendenia lecidellae Diederich, Etayo & Millanes (2022)
- Crittendenia lichenicola (Alstrup, B.Sutton & Tønsberg) Diederich, Millanes & Wedin (2021)
- Crittendenia lopadii Diederich, Holien & Tønsberg (2022)
- Crittendenia parvispora Diederich, van den Boom & Millanes (2022)
- Crittendenia physciiphila Diederich, Pinault, Etayo & Millanes (2022)
- Crittendenia physconiae Diederich, J.C.Zamora & Millanes (2022)
- Crittendenia stictae Diederich, Etayo & Millanes (2022)
- Crittendenia teloschistis Diederich, Etayo, F.Berger & Millanes (2022)
