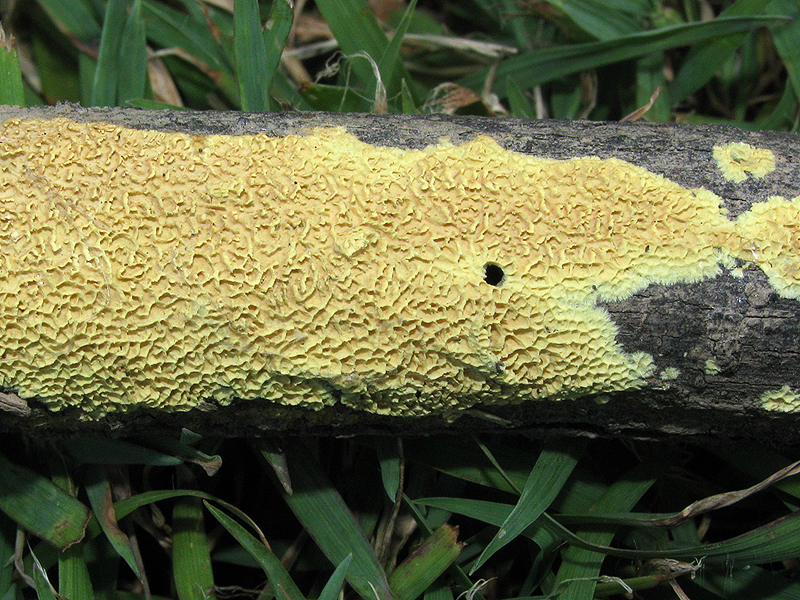
- Lindtneria trachyspora

Scientific classification
- Kingdom: Fungi
- Division: Basidiomycota
- Class: Agaricomycetes
- Order: Agaricales
- Family: Stephanosporaceae
- Genus: Lindtneria; Pilát (1938)

Type species
- Lindtneria trachyspora (Bourdot & Galzin) Pilát (1938)

Species
- L. alutacea L. baboquivariensis L. brevispora L. chordulata L. hydnoidea L. lowei L. panphyliensis L. rugospora L. thujatsugina

= Lindtneria =

Genus of fungi

Lindtneria is a genus of fungi in the family Stephanosporaceae. As of March 2015, Index Fungorum accepts nine species in the genus. It is named after Serbian mycologist Vojteh Lindtner (1904–1965).
