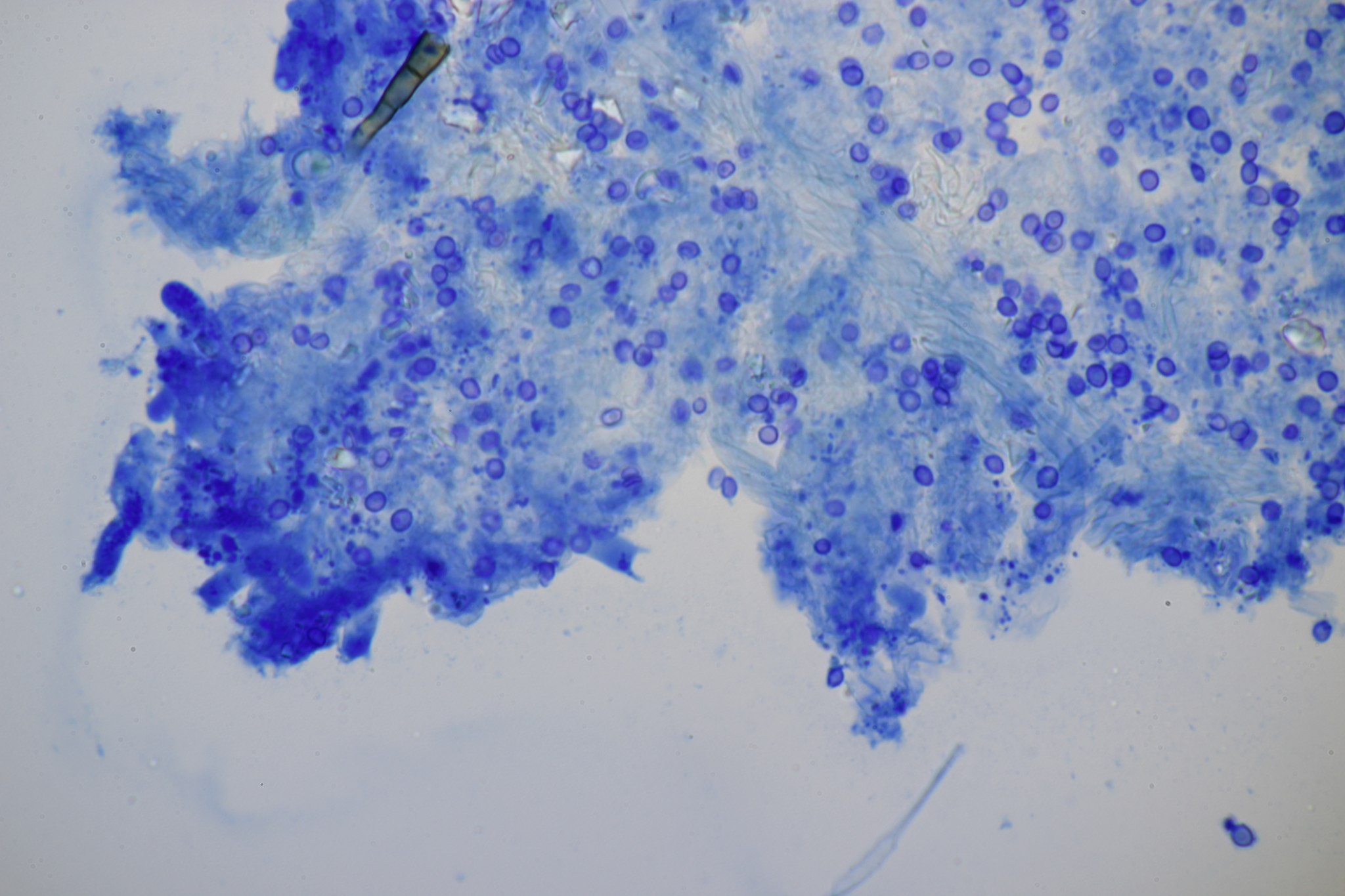
- Cristinia helvetica

Scientific classification
- Kingdom: Fungi
- Division: Basidiomycota
- Class: Agaricomycetes
- Order: Agaricales
- Family: Stephanosporaceae
- Genus: Cristinia; Parmasto

= Cristinia =

Genus of fungi

Cristinia is a genus of fungi belonging to the family Stephanosporaceae.

The genus has cosmopolitan distribution.

== Species ==
Species:

- Cristinia artheniensis Baici & Hjortstam
- Cristinia brevicellularis Hjortstam
- Cristinia coprophila (Wakef.) Hjortstam
