= Phlebiella =

Scientific classification
- Kingdom: Fungi
- Division: Basidiomycota
- Class: Agaricomycetes
- Order: Polyporales
- (unranked): incertae sedis
- Genus: Phlebiella; P.Karst. (1890)

Species
- see text

Genus of fungi

Phlebiella is a genus of crust fungi in the order Polyporales.

== Description ==
Phlebiella species are characterized by pleurobasidia and a lack of cystidia in the hymenium. The genus is otherwise quite variable morphologically; for example, spores range from allantoid (sausage-shaped) to spherical, the surface ornamentation ranges from warted to smooth, and reaction with Melzer's reagent can be amyloid or inamyloid.

== Taxonomy ==
Phlebiella was circumscribed by mycologist Petter Adolf Karsten in 1890. It was pointed out later by Marinus Anton Donk that Karsten did not publish the genus validly, as he did not include a give a generic description. Some authorities have placed Phlebiella in synonymy with Xenasmatella, and the former type species, Phlebiella vaga, is placed in this latter genus as Xenasmatella vaga.

=== Species ===
The following species are recognised in the Phlebiella:

- Phlebiella ailaoshanensis C.L. Zhao (2019)
- Phlebiella sulphurea (Pers.) Ginns & M.N.L. Lefebvre (1993) – Japan
