= Geminago =

Scientific classification
- Kingdom: Fungi
- Division: Basidiomycota
- Class: Ustilaginomycetes
- Order: Ustilaginales
- Family: Geminaginaceae; Vánky
- Genus: Geminago; Vánky & R. Bauer
- Species: G. nonveilleri

Binomial name
- Geminago nonveilleri (Zambett. & Foko) Vánky & R. Bauer

Synonyms
- Mycosyrinx nonveilleri Zambett. & Foko, Revue Mycol., Paris 35(5): 304 (1971); Mycosyrinx nonveilleri Zambett., Bull. trimest. Soc. mycol. Fr. 86(2): 307 (1971)

Family of fungi

The Geminaginaceae are a family of smut fungi in the order Ustilaginomycetes. The family is monotypic, containing the single genus, Geminago, with the single species Geminago nonveilleri. It was originally found on the inflorescence of Triplochiton scleroxylon in Cameroon, Africa. It was published and described as Mycosyrinx nonveilleri by Zambett. & Foko in Revue Mycol., Paris 35(5): 304 in 1971. Before being renamed in 1996 by Vánky & R. Bauer.
