= Clintamra =

Scientific classification
- Kingdom: Fungi
- Division: Basidiomycota
- Class: Ustilaginomycetes
- Order: Ustilaginales
- Family: Clintamraceae; Vánky (2001)
- Genus: Clintamra; Cordas & Durán (1977)
- Species: C. nolinae

Binomial name
- Clintamra nolinae (G.P.Clinton) Cordas & Durán (1977)

Synonyms
- Tolyposporella nolinae G.P.Clinton (1904)

Family of fungi

Clintamraceae is a family of smut fungi in the order Ustilaginales. The family is monotypic, containing the single genus Clintamra with the species Clintamra nolinae.
