= Agaricostilbaceae =

Scientific classification
- Kingdom: Fungi
- Division: Basidiomycota
- Class: Agaricostilbomycetes
- Order: Agaricostilbales
- Family: Agaricostilbaceae; Oberw. & R.Bauer (1989)

Type genus
- Agaricostilbum J.E.Wright (1970)

Genera
- Pseudobensingtonia; Sterigmatomyces

Genus of fungi

The Agaricostilbaceae are a family of fungi in the order Agaricostilbales. Basidiocarps (fruitbodies), where known, are stalked and capitate and produce spores on basidia that are laterally septate. Most species are known only from their yeast states. The family contains two genera (Agaricostilbum being a synonym of Sterigmatomyces).
