= Xenosperma =

Scientific classification
- Kingdom: Fungi
- Division: Basidiomycota
- Class: Agaricomycetes
- Order: Polyporales
- Family: Xenasmataceae
- Genus: Xenosperma; Oberw. (1966)

Type species
- Xenasma ludibundum (D.P.Rogers & Liberta) Oberw. ex Jülich (1979)

Species
- X. hexagonosporum X. ludibundum X. murrillii X. pravum

Genus of fungi

Xenosperma is a genus of corticioid fungi in the order Polyporales. Circumscribed by German mycologist Franz Oberwinkler in 1966, the widespread genus contains four species.
