= Atractogloea =

Scientific classification
- Kingdom: Fungi
- Division: Basidiomycota
- Class: Atractiellomycetes
- Order: Atractiellales
- Family: Atractogloeaceae; Oberw. & R.Bauer (1989)
- Genus: Atractogloea; Oberw. & Bandoni (1982)
- Species: A. stillata

Binomial name
- Atractogloea stillata Oberw. & Bandoni (1982)

Family of fungi

Atractogloeaceae is a fungal family in the order Atractiellales. The family contains the single genus Atractogloea, which in turn contains the single species Atractogloea stillata, found in the USA.

== See also ==
- List of Basidiomycota families
