= Kondoaceae =

Scientific classification
- Kingdom: Fungi
- Division: Basidiomycota
- Class: Agaricostilbomycetes
- Order: Agaricostilbales
- Family: Kondoaceae; R.Bauer, Begerow, J.P.Samp., M.Weiss & Oberw. (2006)

Type genus
- Kondoa Y.Yamada, Nakagawa & I.Banno (1989)

Genera
- Bensingtonia; Kondoa

Order of fungi

Kondoaceae is a family of fungi in the order Agaricostilbales. The family contains two genera. Most species are known only from their yeast states. Hyphal teleomorphs produced in culture have auricularioid (laterally septate) basidia.
