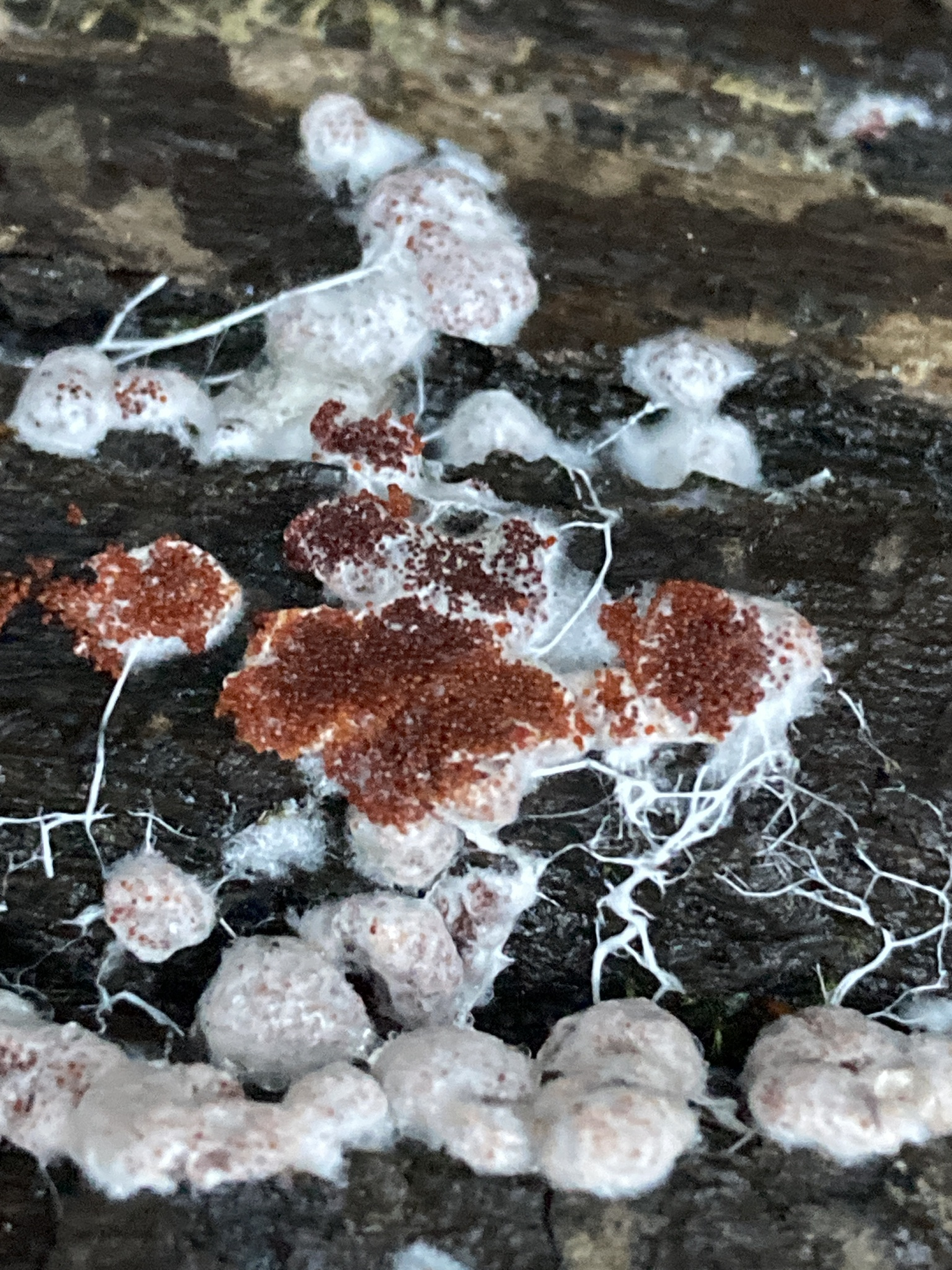
- Myriococcum praecox

Scientific classification
- Kingdom: Fungi
- Division: Basidiomycota
- Class: Agaricomycetes
- Order: Agaricales
- Family: Stephanosporaceae
- Genus: Myriococcum; Fr. (1823)

Type species
- Myriococcum praecox Fr. (1823)

= Myriococcum =

Genus of fungi

Myriococcum is a genus of fungi in the family Stephanosporaceae. The type and only species, M. praecox, originally described from Sweden, produces a mycelium with small, dark brown sclerotia. DNA analysis has shown this belongs within the Agaricales. Several other species formerly referred to Myriococcum are now placed within the Ascomycota in the genera Cryptendoxyla and Crassicarpon.
