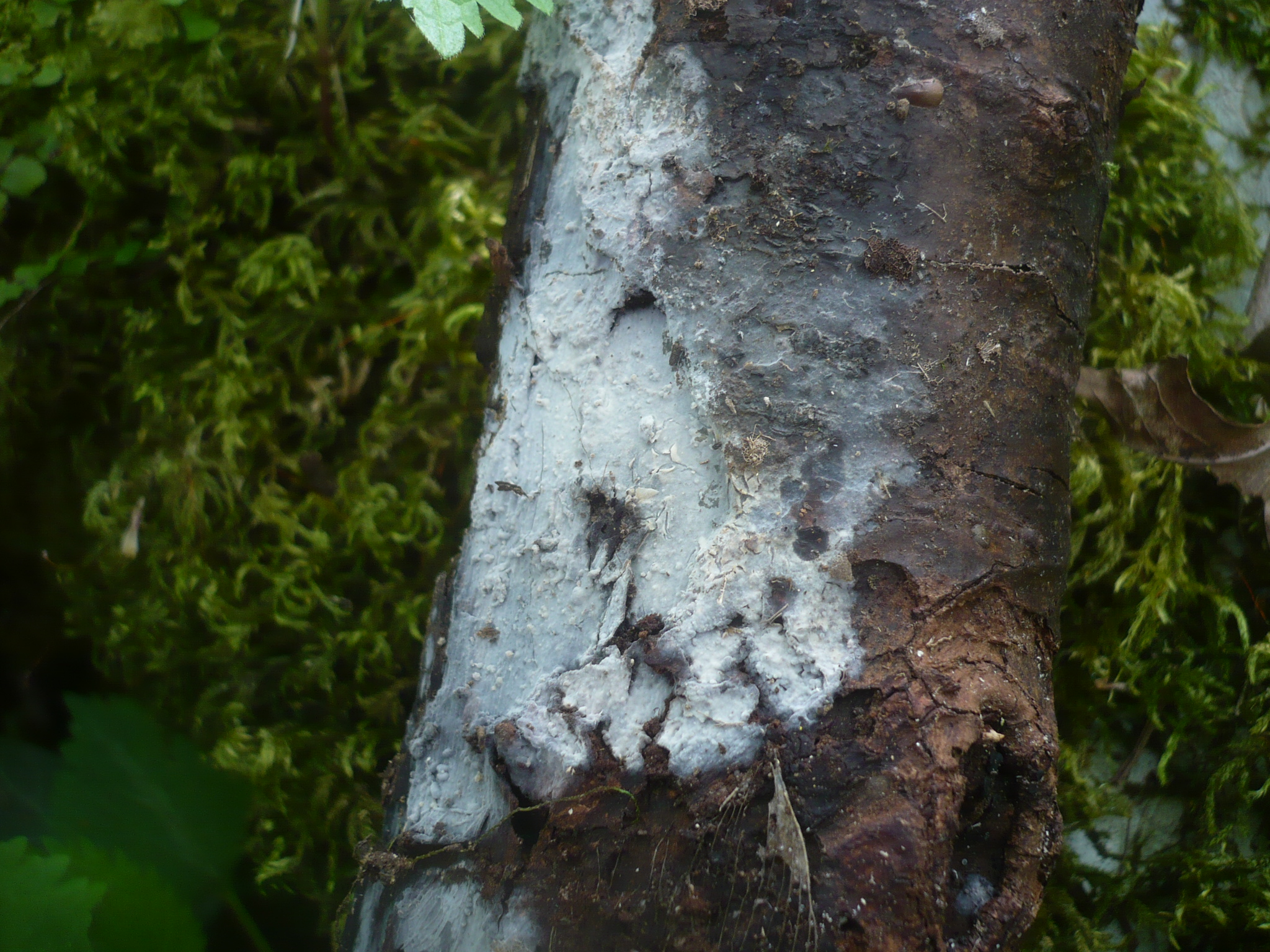
- Xenasma pulverulentum

Scientific classification
- Kingdom: Fungi
- Division: Basidiomycota
- Class: Agaricomycetes
- Order: Polyporales
- Family: Xenasmataceae; Oberw. (1966)

Type genus
- Xenasma Donk (1957)

Genera
- Phlebiella; Xenasma; Xenasmatella; Xenosperma

Synonyms
- Xenasmateae (Oberw.) Parmasto (1968)

= Xenasmataceae =

Family of fungi

The Xenasmataceae are a family of crust fungi in the order Russulales. The family was circumscribed in 1966 by German mycologist Franz Oberwinkler with Xenasma as the type genus. As of April 2018, Index Fungorum accepts 28 species in the family. Xenasmataceae fungi grow as saprobes on fallen wood and are known primarily from temperate areas.

== Description ==
Fruit bodies of Xenasmataceae fungi are usually crust-like, with a waxy or gelatinous texture. The fungi have a monomitic hyphal system, and the hyphae are frequently gelatinous. Spores are translucent, and often stain with Melzer's reagent.
