= Papiliotrema laurentii =

Scientific classification
- Kingdom: Fungi
- Division: Basidiomycota
- Class: Tremellomycetes
- Order: Tremellales
- Family: Rhynchogastremaceae
- Genus: Papiliotrema
- Species: P. laurentii

Binomial name
- Papiliotrema laurentii (Kuff.) X.Z. Liu, F.Y. Bai, M. Groenew. & Boekhout (2015)

Synonyms
- Torula laurentii Kuff (1920); Cryptococcus laurentii (Kuff) Lodder (1934)

Species of fungus

Papiliotrema laurentii (synonym Cryptococcus laurentii) is a species of fungus in the family Rhynchogastremaceae. It is typically isolated in its yeast state.

In its yeast state, it is a rare human pathogen, able to provoke a skin condition, or fungemia in immunocompromised hosts.

It can also be used as sole source of food for the rearing of Caenorhabditis elegans.
