= Chionosphaeraceae =

Scientific classification
- Kingdom: Fungi
- Division: Basidiomycota
- Class: Agaricostilbomycetes
- Order: Agaricostilbales
- Family: Chionosphaeraceae; Oberw. & Bandoni (1982)

Type genus
- Chionosphaera D.E.Cox (1976)

Genera
- Ballistosporomyces; Boekhoutia; Chionosphaera; Cystobasidiopsis; Kurtzmanomyces; Stilbum

Family of fungi

The Chionosphaeraceae are a family of fungi in the order Agaricostilbales. The family contains six genera. Some species form small, stilboid (pin-shaped) fruitbodies. Others are known only from their yeast states.
