= Papiliotrema =

Scientific classification
- Domain: Eukaryota
- Kingdom: Fungi
- Division: Basidiomycota
- Class: Tremellomycetes
- Order: Tremellales
- Family: Rhynchogastremaceae
- Genus: Papiliotrema; J.P.Samp., M.Weiss & R.Bauer

Type species
- Papiliotrema bandonii J.P.Samp., M.Weiss & R.Bauer

Synonyms
- Auriculibuller

Genus of fungi

Papiliotrema is a genus of fungi in the family Rhynchogastremaceae. Filamentous states, where known, form septate basidia with haustorial cells indicating they are parasites of other fungi. Most species are currently known only from their yeast states. More than 20 species have been referred to Papiliotrema.

Papiliotrema terrestris is considered to be a ubiquitous yeast in the soil. Papiliotrema laurentii is a rare human pathogen.
