= Pucciniosira =

Scientific classification
- Domain: Eukaryota
- Kingdom: Fungi
- Division: Basidiomycota
- Class: Pucciniomycetes
- Order: Pucciniales
- Family: Pucciniosiraceae
- Genus: Pucciniosira; Lagerh.

Synonyms
- Aecidiella J.B.Ellis & Kelsey, 1897; Didymosira F.E.Clements, 1909; Schizospora Dietel, 1895

Genus of fungi

Pucciniosira is a genus of rust fungi belonging to the family Pucciniosiraceae.

The type species is Pucciniosira triumfettae Lagerh., 1892 which is now Pucciniosira pallidula.

The Pucciniosira species are characterized by having Puccinia-like teliospores that are produced in chains alternately with intercalary cells. The sori have a continuous to rudimentary peridium (protective layer). In some species, the teliospores break easily into halves along their septa. They form circular groups of rust spores on the lower surfaces of the leaves of various species of plants (including solanum species).

The genus name of Pucciniosira is in honour of Tommaso Puccini (1666-1735), who was an Italian botanist and doctor. He taught Anatomy at Hospital of Santa Maria Nuova in Florence.

== Distribution ==
The species of this genus are found in America (including north America, Ecuador, Honduras, Guatemala, Panama, and Mexico,) and Africa (including Nigeria,) , as well as New Zealand, and Australia (Gold Coast).

== Ecology ==
In Veracruz within Mexico, species Pucciniosira pallidula (Speg.) Henn. (1896) infects Heliocarpus donnellsmithii Rose. Pucciniosira pallidula was also found on Triumfetta semitriloba Jacq. in Florida, USA.

In Panama, species Pucciniosira dorata is found on Triumfetta bogotensis (in Malvaceae family)

Pucciniosira holwayi H.S. Jacks. (1932) is found on Solanum laxiflorum (a synonym of Solanum barbeyanum) in Brazil. As well as Pucciniosira hyphoperidiata Viégas (1945) which is found on various solanum species. Pucciniosira solani Lagerh. ex Sacc. (1895) causes yellow leaf rust on solanum species in Brazil and Ecuador.

== Species ==
As accepted by Species Fungorum;

- Pucciniosira albida Buriticá & Pardo-Card. (1998)
- Pucciniosira anthocleistae (Henn.) Henn. (1905)
- Pucciniosira arthurii Buriticá & J.F. Hennen (1980)
- Pucciniosira brickelliae Dietel & Holw. (1897)
- Pucciniosira clemensiae Arthur & Cummins (1937)
- Pucciniosira cumminsiana Buriticá & J.F. Hennen (1980)
- Pucciniosira deightonii Cummins (1945)
- Pucciniosira dorata Buriticá & J.F. Hennen (1980)
- Pucciniosira eupatorii Lagerh. (1918)
- Pucciniosira holwayi H.S. Jacks. (1932)
- Pucciniosira hyphoperidiata Viégas (1945)
- Pucciniosira mitragynae (Dietel) Dietel ex P. Syd. & Syd. (1915)
- Pucciniosira pallidula (Speg.) Henn. (1896)
- Pucciniosira solani Lagerh. ex Sacc. (1895)
- Pucciniosira tuberculata (Ellis & Kellerm.) Buriticá & J.F. Hennen (1991)

Former species, (all Pucciniosiraceae family)

- P. cornuta (Massee) Buriticá & J.F. Hennen (1988) = Gambleola cornuta
- P. dissotidis (Cooke) Wakef. (1917) = Puccinia dissotidis
- P. triumfettae Lagerh. (1892) = Pucciniosira pallidula
- P. triumfettae Lagerh. ex Sacc. (1895) = Pucciniosira pallidula
