= Volvocisporium =

Scientific classification
- Kingdom: Fungi
- Division: Basidiomycota
- Class: Exobasidiomycetes
- Order: Microstromatales
- Family: Volvocisporiaceae Begerow, R.Bauer & Oberw. (2001)
- Genus: Volvocisporium Begerow, R.Bauer & Oberw. (2001)

Type species
- Volvocisporium triumfetticola (M.S.Patil) Begerow, R.Bauer & Oberw. (2001)

Synonyms
- Muribasidiospora triumfetticola M.S.Patil (1978)

Genus of fungi

Volvocisporiaceae is a fungal family in the class Exobasidiomycetes. The family contains the single genus Volvocisporium, which in turn contains the single species Volvocisporium triumfetticola, found on the leaves of Triumfetta rhomboidea in India.
