= Quambalaria =

Scientific classification
- Kingdom: Fungi
- Division: Basidiomycota
- Class: Exobasidiomycetes
- Order: Microstromatales
- Family: Quambalariaceae; Z.W.de Beer, Begerow & R.Bauer (2006)
- Genus: Quambalaria; J.A.Simpson (2000)

Type species
- Quambalaria pitereka (J.Walker & Bertus) J.A.Simpson (2000)

Species
- 9 species, including: Q. cyanescens Q. coyrecup Q. eucalypti Q. pitereka Q. pusilla

Synonyms
- Fugomyces Sigler (2003)

Family of fungi

The Quambalariaceae are a family of fungi in the class Exobasidiomycetes. The family contains the single genus Quambalaria, which in turn contains nine species. Quambalaria was circumscribed in 2000 to accommodate plant pathogenic species—previously classified in Ramularia and Sporothrix—that were known to infect Corymbia trees in Australia, causing a leaf spot and shoot blight and canker disease.
