= Sclerogaster =

Scientific classification
- Kingdom: Fungi
- Division: Basidiomycota
- Class: Agaricomycetes
- Order: Geastrales
- Family: Sclerogastraceae; Locq. ex P.M.Kirk (2008)
- Genus: Sclerogaster; R.Hesse (1891)

Type species
- Sclerogaster lanatus Mattir. (1900)

Genus of fungi

The Sclerogastraceae are a family of fungi in the order Geastrales. The family contains the single genus Sclerogaster, which contains 10 species found in Europe and America. The genus was circumscribed by botanist Rudolf Hesse in 1891.

== Species ==
- Sclerogaster candidus
- Sclerogaster columellatus
- Sclerogaster compactus
- Sclerogaster gastrosporioides
- Sclerogaster hysterangioides
- Sclerogaster luteocarneus
- Sclerogaster minor
- Sclerogaster pacificus
- Sclerogaster siculus
- Sclerogaster xerophilus
