= Pachnocybe =

Scientific classification
- Kingdom: Fungi
- Division: Basidiomycota
- Class: Pucciniomycetes
- Order: Pachnocybales; R.Bauer, Begerow, J.P.Samp., M.Weiss & Oberw.
- Family: Pachnocybaceae; Oberw. & R.Bauer
- Genus: Pachnocybe; Berk.

Genus of fungi

The Pachnocybe are a genus of fungi, within the monotypic family of Pachnocybaceae Oberw. & R.Bauer, 1989, and within the monotypic order of Pachnocybales, within the class Pucciniomycetes. They are parasitic on plants or saprobic on rotten wood.

== History ==
The genus of Pachnocybe was created in 1836, when English cryptogamist Miles Joseph Berkeley moved several species from other genera into his new genus. Such as Sporocybe albida became Pachnocybe albida.

The genus name of Pachnocybe was derived from Greek word Pachne meaning hoar-frost and also cybe meaning head.

Hughes in 1958 in his review of classical hyphomycete genera selected Pachnocybe ferruginea as type species of the genus. He also excluded Pachnocybe grisea as a synonym of Cephalotrichum purpureofuscum (in the family Microascaceae).

The genus Pachnocybe was then assigned as fungi imperfecti by Ellis in 1971, then in 1980 Carmichael et al. suggested it had an ascomycetous relationship. Then Oberwinkler and Bandoni in 1982, after studying the morphology of species Pachnocybe ferruginea found strong basidiomycetous relationships. In 1986, Kropp and Corden proposed it should be placed in the Chionosphaeraceae family.

The genus was later placed in order Atractiellales, due to species in the group having gastroid basidia and simple septal pores.

The genus Pachnocybe was placed in family Septobasidiaceae (Septobasidiales order), even though many Septobasidiaceae species were mostly parasitic on scale insects. The family placement was based on weakly supported phylogenetic inference, and the reported presence of 'microscala', (which are membrane complexes, consisting of layers of membranes of endoplasmic reticulum, interconnected by a regular array of rodlets which may also connect to the mitochondria) (Kleven and McLaughlin, 1989; Bauer and Oberwinkler, 1990).

== Description ==
They were originally described in 1836 and 1863 as having "a solid stem, filiform below, clavate above, dusted with minute spores".

Species in the Pachnocybaceae family have a basidiomata (spore stem) that stilboid (pin-shaped), stipitate (possessing a stipe, stem) and capitate (resembles the head of a pin), smooth, not viscid or gelatinous in form. The fertile head is globose (rounded), hyaline (glass-like) or pale yellowish, with the entire surface composed of packed basidia (spore-producing structures). The dark reddish brown stipe is composed of closely adherent thick walled hyphae (long, branching, filamentous structure). The hyphae have simple septal spores, with no clamp connections and fertile hyphae are frequently branched. The basidia is clavate to cylindrical (in form), aseptate (undivided), with basal clamp connections and an apical cluster of 4-6 minute sterigmata (small supporting structures). The basidiospores are ellipsoidal (in form), hyaline or yellowish with smooth and thick walls.

Pachnocybe ferruginea was thought to be a dikaryotic mycelium that formed brown capitate basidiocarps. However, one form had associated blastic-sympodial conidia, larger basidiocarps, chlamydospores, and had a slower growth rate. Single uninucleate basidiospores of both forms produced dikaryotic mycelium with simple septal pores and holobasidia in which karogamy and meiosis occurred. Thus, P. ferruginea has a primary homothallic life cycle. Spores from conidial isolates gave rise to both basidiocarps and the conidial form demonstrating that the conidial form is the anamorph of P. ferruginea.

They have a primary homothallic life cycle.

== List of species ==
The genus Pachnocybe contain 4 known species;

- Pachnocybe acicula Berk. (1836)
- Pachnocybe albida (Fr.) Berk. (1836)
- Pachnocybe ferruginea Berk. (1836)
- Pachnocybe incerta (P. Karst.) S. Hughes (1958)

Former species;

- Pachnocybe clavulata Grove (1885) = Phaeoisaria clavulata Diatrypaceae
- Pachnocybe grisea Berk. (1836) = Cephalotrichum purpureofuscum Microascaceae

2 other species are noted elsewhere but not listed in Species Fungorum.

- Pachnocybe rosea Berk. & M.A. Curtis (found on the wood of Acacia julibrissin in America)
- Pachnocybe subulata (Nees & T. Nees) Berk. (found on the bark of Robinia pseudoacacia species, and in Scotland, on decaying plants and fir cones,)

== Hosts ==
Pachnocybe ferruginea has been found on domestic wood, such as pine floorboards in a house, on a wine cask and also on timbers inside a mine (Levy and Lloyd, 1960,) within the UK. It was also found in Douglas fir (Pseudotsuga menziesii) made utility poles in western Oregon, USA.

== Distribution ==
The order has a scattered distribution, they are recorded mostly in Europe, North America (including Canada,), some in Africa and rarely in India and the Pacific Ocean. They can be found in terrestrial and aquatic environments.

Species Pachnocybe albida has been found on rotten logs of Buxus, Fraxinus and Quercus.

== Other sources ==
- C.J. Alexopolous, Charles W. Mims, M. Blackwell et al., Introductory Mycology, 4th ed. (John Wiley and Sons, Hoboken NJ, 2004) ISBN 0-471-52229-5
