= Alveolaria (fungus) =

Scientific classification
- Domain: Eukaryota
- Kingdom: Fungi
- Division: Basidiomycota
- Class: Pucciniomycetes
- Order: Pucciniales
- Family: Pucciniosiraceae
- Genus: Alveolaria; Lagerh.

Genus of fungi

Alveolaria is a genus of fungi belonging to the family Pucciniosiraceae.

The species of this genus are found in Central America.

== Species ==
As accepted by Species Fungorum;

- Alveolaria andina Lagerh. ex Sacc. (1895)
- Alveolaria cordiae Lagerh. ex Sacc. (1895)

Former species, A. duguetiae Viégas (1945) = Dietelia duguetiae, Pucciniosiraceae
