= Cintractiellaceae =

Scientific classification
- Kingdom: Fungi
- Division: Basidiomycota
- Class: Ustilaginomycotina
- Subclass: incertae sedis
- Order: Cintractiellales McTaggart & R.G. Shivas
- Family: Cintractiellaceae Vánky (2003)

Type genus
- Cintractiella Boedijn (1937)

Family of fungi

The Cintractiellaceae are a monotypic, family of smut fungi, in the order Cintractiellales, but unplaced beyond that. The family contains one genera, Cintractiella with four species. The family was circumscribed by mycologist Kálmán Vánky in 2003.

Family Cintractiellaceae Vánky was placed in a monotypic order Cintractiellales McTaggart & R.G. Shivas in 2020.

== Taxon ==
As accepted by Species Fungorum;

- Cintractiella diplasiae (Henn.) M. Piepenbr. (2001)
- Cintractiella kosraensis Aime, M. Abbasi & K.R. Wood (2018)
- Cintractiella lamii Boedijn (1937)
- Cintractiella scirpodendri Prychid & J.J. Bruhl (2020)
