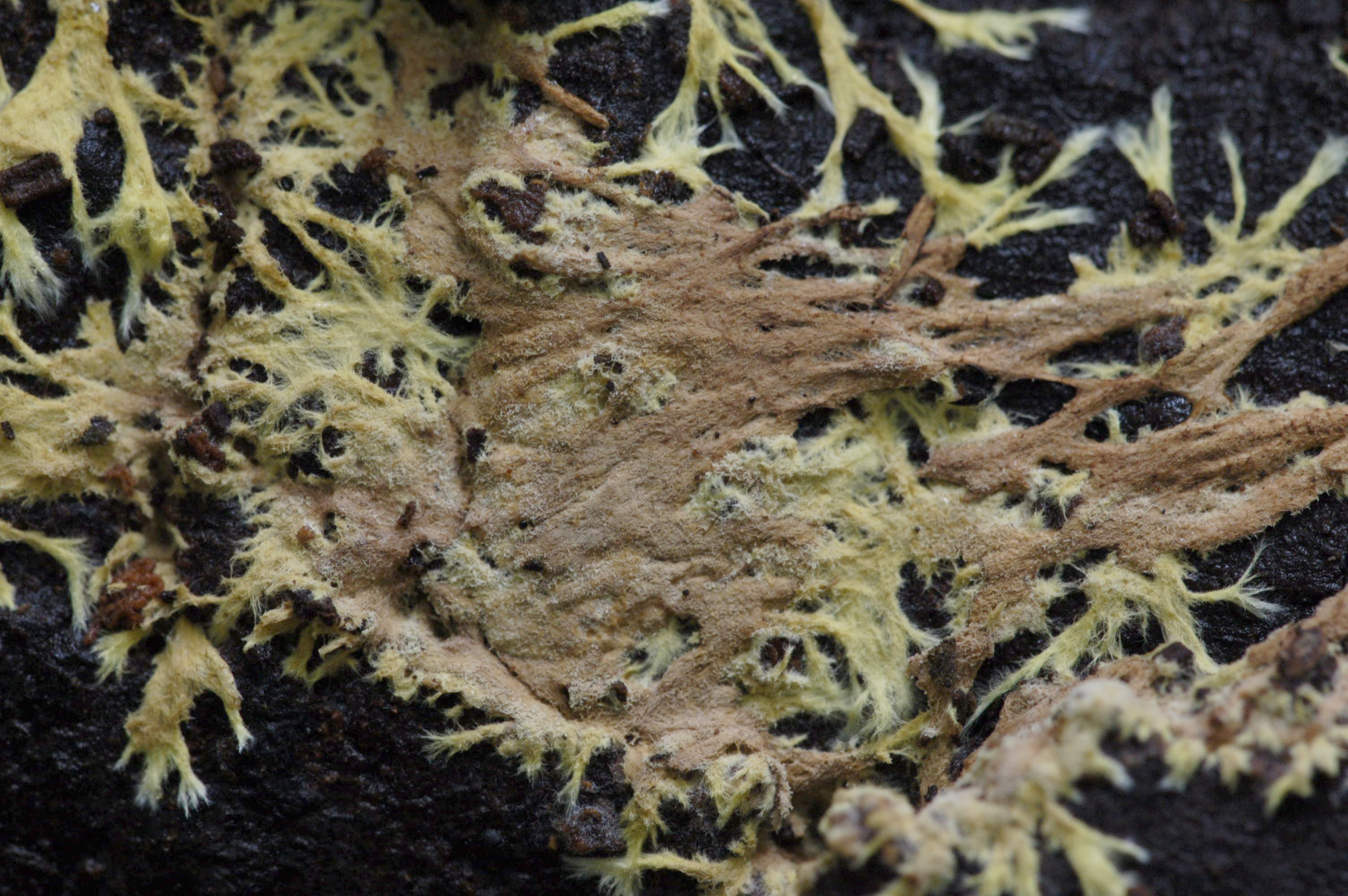
- Xenasmatella vaga

Scientific classification
- Kingdom: Fungi
- Division: Basidiomycota
- Class: Agaricomycetes
- Order: Polyporales
- Family: Xenasmataceae
- Genus: Xenasmatella; Oberw. (1966)

Type species
- Xenasmatella subflavidogrisea (Litsch.) Oberw. (1966)

Species
- see text

Synonyms
- Tomentella P.Karst. (1889)

= Xenasmatella =

Genus of fungi

Xenasmatella is a genus of corticioid fungi in the order Polyporales. Circumscribed by German mycologist Franz Oberwinkler in 1966, the widespread genus contains 27 species.

== Species ==
The following species are recognised in the genus Xenasmatella:

- Xenasmatella alnicola (Bourdot & Galzin) K.H. Larss. & Ryvarden (2020)
- Xenasmatella ardosiaca (Bourdot & Galzin) Stalpers (1996) – Taiwan; Tennessee
- Xenasmatella athelioidea (N. Maek.) N. Maek. (2021)
- Xenasmatella bicornis (Boidin & Gilles) Piatek (2005)
- Xenasmatella borealis (K.H.Larss. & Hjortstam) Duhem (2010)
- Xenasmatella californica (Liberta) Hjortstam (1983)
- Xenasmatella caricis-pendulae (P.Roberts) Duhem (2010)
- Xenasmatella christiansenii (Parmasto) Stalpers (1996)
- Xenasmatella cinnamomea (Burds. & Nakasone) Stalpers (1996)
- Xenasmatella fibrillosa (Hallenb.) Stalpers (1996)
- Xenasmatella gaspesica (Liberta) Hjortstam (1983)
- Xenasmatella globigera (Hjortstam & Ryvarden) Duhem (2010)
- Xenasmatella gossypina (C.L. Zhao) G. Gruhn & Trichies (2021)
- Xenasmatella hjortstamii S.L. Liu & L.W. Zhou (2023)
- Xenasmatella inopinata (H.S. Jacks.) Hjortstam & Ryvarden (1979)
- Xenasmatella insperata (H.S.Jacks.) Jülich (1979)
- Xenasmatella nasti (Boidin & Gilles) Stalpers (1996)
- Xenasmatella odontioidea Ryvarden & Liberta (1978)
- Xenasmatella palmicola (Hjortstam & Ryvarden) Duhem (2010)
- Xenasmatella rhizomorpha C.L. Zhao (2020)
- Xenasmatella romellii Hjortstam (1983) – Sweden
- Xenasmatella sanguinescens Svrcek (1973)
- Xenasmatella subflavidogrisea (Litsch.) Oberw. ex Jülich (1979) – Great Britain
- Xenasmatella tenuis C.L. Zhao (2020)
- Xenasmatella vaga (Fr.) Stalpers (1996) – Europe; United States
- Xenasmatella wuliangshanensis (C.L. Zhao) G. Gruhn & Trichies (2021)
- Xenasmatella xinpingensis C.L. Zhao (2020)
