= Queensland Plant Pathology Herbarium and Insect Collection =

The Plant Pathology Herbarium and Insect Collection is a Queensland Government scientific collection based in Queensland, Australia. Based at the Department of Agriculture and Fisheries, the collection holds specimens of known fungal pathogens of plants grown in Queensland, as well as insect pests that occur in the state. In 1966 the herbarium was given the abbreviation BRIP. This abbreviation has official status in that it was the first listed in Index Herbarium. The abbreviation is not an acronym where each letter represents a word, but rather derived from the words 'Brisbane' and 'Pathology'.

Supporting the Federal Biosecurity Act 2015, the Federal Environment Protection and Biodiversity Conservation Act 1999, the state's Biosecurity Act 2014, and the Queensland Biosecurity Strategy 2018-2023, the collection enhances Queensland's biosecurity through the early detection and reliable and accurate identification of new and emerging plant diseases and pests.

The Plant Pathology Herbarium contains:

- more than 110,000 specimens representing almost 2,000 fungal species
- a Culture Collection of 22,000 fungal cultures and 1,000 bacterial cultures.

The Insect Collection has approximately:

- 1.5 million pinned insect specimens
- 52,000 slide-mounted specimens.

== Significance of collection ==
The correct identification of a pathogen or pest is not only of importance to individual farms but also has far-reaching economic consequences. In many cases, the early detection of a pathogen or pest can save millions by allowing easy countermeasures that are also less destructive for the rest of the ecosystem.

In 2004, Pakistan authorities rejected the importation of two bulk carriers of wheat in the Port of Karachi. It was claimed that Karnal bunt (caused by the smut fungus Tilletia indica) had infected the wheat. Australian biosecurity and wheat officials refuted the claims, based on evidence that the fungus was a different species that was present on grass in the wheat field. The finding saved the Australian economy AUD$31 million in trade. Across Australia, findings such as these have potentially saved the Australian economy billions of dollars in potential lost export markets.
