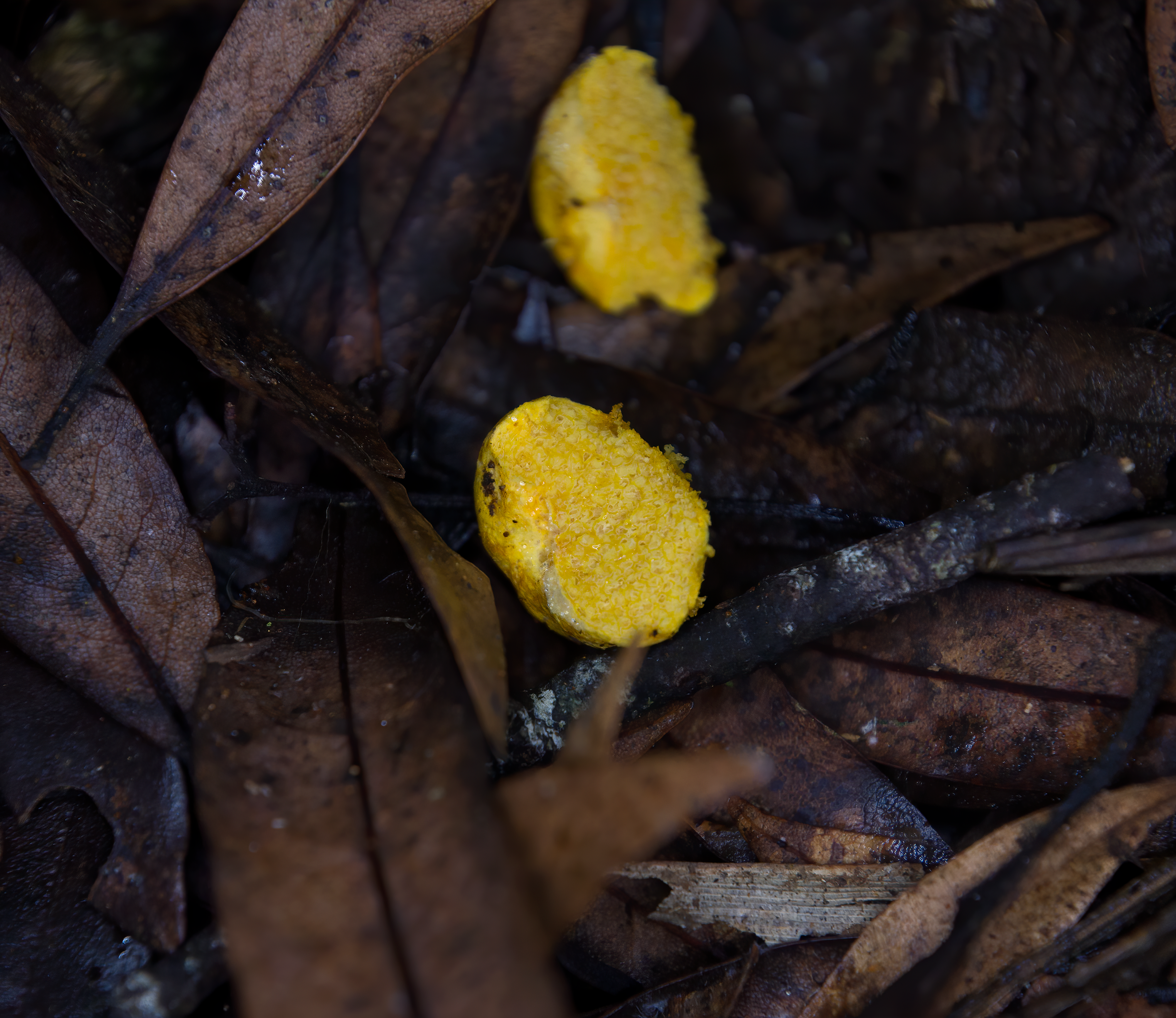
- A cross section of a basidiocarp from an unknown species of Stephanospora

Scientific classification
- Kingdom: Fungi
- Division: Basidiomycota
- Class: Agaricomycetes
- Order: Agaricales
- Family: Stephanosporaceae
- Genus: Stephanospora; Pat. (1914)

Type species
- Stephanospora caroticolor (Berk.) Pat. (1914)

= Stephanospora =

Genus of fungi

Stephanospora is a genus of truffle-like gasteroid fungi in the order Agaricales. In 2014, nine new Australasian cryptic species were described.

== Taxonomy ==
Stephanospora was circumscribed by French mycologist Narcisse Théophile Patouillard in 1914 with S. caroticolor (formerly classified as a species of Hydnangium) as the type species.

== Species ==
- S. aorangi Beever, Castellano & T.Lebel (2015)
- S. caroticolor (Berk.) Pat. (1914)
- S. chilensis (E.Horak) J.M.Vidal (2005) — South America, Europe
- S. corneri Pegler & T.W.K.Young (1979) — Singapore
- S. cribbae T.Lebel & Castellano (2015) — Australia
- S. flava (Rodway) G.W.Beaton, Pegler & T.W.K.Young (1985) — Australia, South Africa
- S. hystrispora T.Lebel & Castellano, (2015) — Australia
- S. kanuka T.Lebel & Castellano (2015) — New Zealand
- S. novae-caledoniae T.Lebel, Castellano & K.Hosaka (2015) — New Caledonia
- S. occidentiaustralis T.Lebel & Castellano (2015) — Australia
- S. papua T.Lebel & Castellano (2015) — Papua New Guinea
- S. penangensis Corner & Hawker (1953) — Peninsular Malaysia
- S. poropingao T.Lebel & Castellano (2015) — New Zealand
- S. pounamu T.Lebel & Castellano (2015) — New Zealand
- S. redolens (G.Cunn.) E.Horak (1979)
- S. sheoak T.Lebel & Castellano (2015) — Australia
- S. tetraspora T.Lebel, Beever & Castellano (2015) — Australia

== Chemistry ==
The carrot colored truffle (Stephanospora caroticolor) produces an orange basidiocarp with pigmentation resulting from stephanosporin, a hydrazide containing 2-chloro-4-nitrophenol precursor. Upon fungal tissue injury, stephanosporin is rapidly converted to the topical fungicide potassium 2-chloro-4-nitrophenolate (nitrofungin potassium)—a chemical defense mechanism unique to this family of fungi.

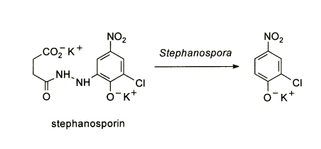
A schematic representation of the unique chemical defense pathway in Stephanospora fungi.
