= Phragmoxenidiaceae =

Scientific classification
- Kingdom: Fungi
- Division: Basidiomycota
- Class: Tremellomycetes
- Order: Tremellales
- Family: Phragmoxenidiaceae; Oberw. & R. Bauer (1990)

Genus
- Phragmoxenidium

Family of fungi

The Phragmoxenidiaceae are a family of fungi in the order Tremellales. Only a single species from central and northern Europe is known, Phragmoxenidium mycophilum.
