= Hybogasteraceae =

Scientific classification
- Kingdom: Fungi
- Division: Basidiomycota
- Class: Agaricomycetes
- Order: Russulales
- Family: Hybogasteraceae; Jülich (1982)

Genera
- Hybogaster

Family of fungi

The Hybogasteraceae are a family of fungi in the order Russulales. The family consists of a single genus, Hybogaster, only known from southern Chile, and associated with living Nothofagus trees.
