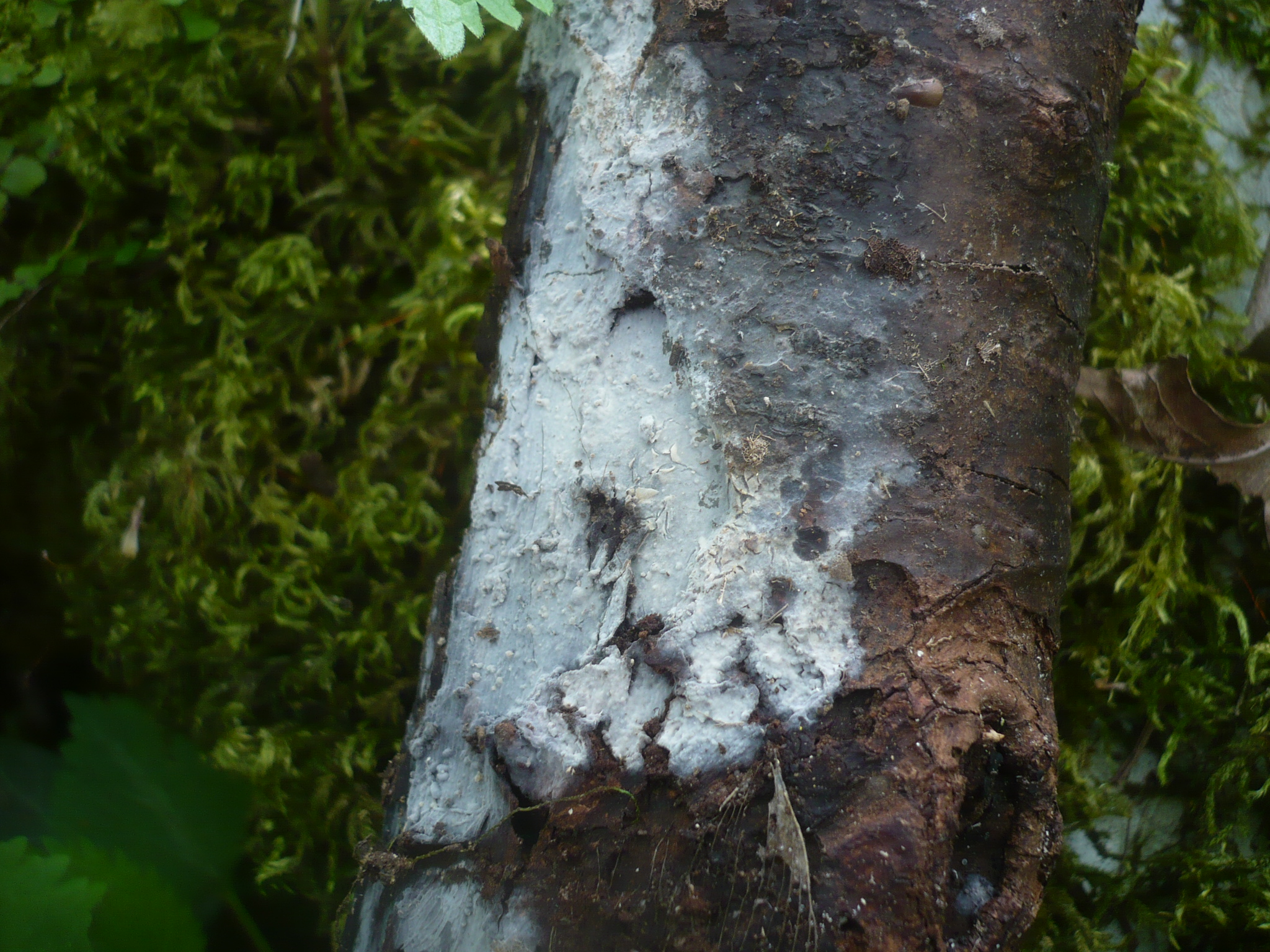
- Xenasma pulverulentum

Scientific classification
- Kingdom: Fungi
- Division: Basidiomycota
- Class: Agaricomycetes
- Order: Polyporales
- Family: Xenasmataceae
- Genus: Xenasma; Donk (1957)

Type species
- Xenasma rimicola (P.Karst.) Donk (1957)

Synonyms
- Clitopilina G.Arnaud (1951)

= Xenasma =

Genus of fungi

Xenasma is a genus of corticioid fungi in the order Polyporales. It was circumscribed by mycologist Marinus Anton Donk in 1957.

== Species ==
- Xenasma aculeatum C.E.Gómez (1972) – Argentina
- Xenasma amylosporum Parmasto (1968)
- Xenasma longicystidiatum Boidin & Gilles (2000) – Réunion Island
- Xenasma parvisporum Pouzar (1982)
- Xenasma praeteritum (H.S.Jacks.) Donk (1957) – Cameroon; Jamaica; Puerto Rico
- Xenasma pruinosum (Pat.) Donk (1957) – Great Britain
- Xenasma pulverulentum (Litsch.) Donk (1957) – Dominican Republic; France; Great Britain; Jamaica; Netherlands
- Xenasma rimicola (P.Karst.) Donk (1957) – Portugal; Taiwan
- Xenasma subclematidis S.S.Rattan (1977) – Asia
- Xenasma tulasnelloideum (Höhn. & Litsch.) Donk (1957) – Cameroon; Dominican Republic; Great Britain; Ontario; Portugal
- Xenasma vassilievae Parmasto (1965) – Europe
