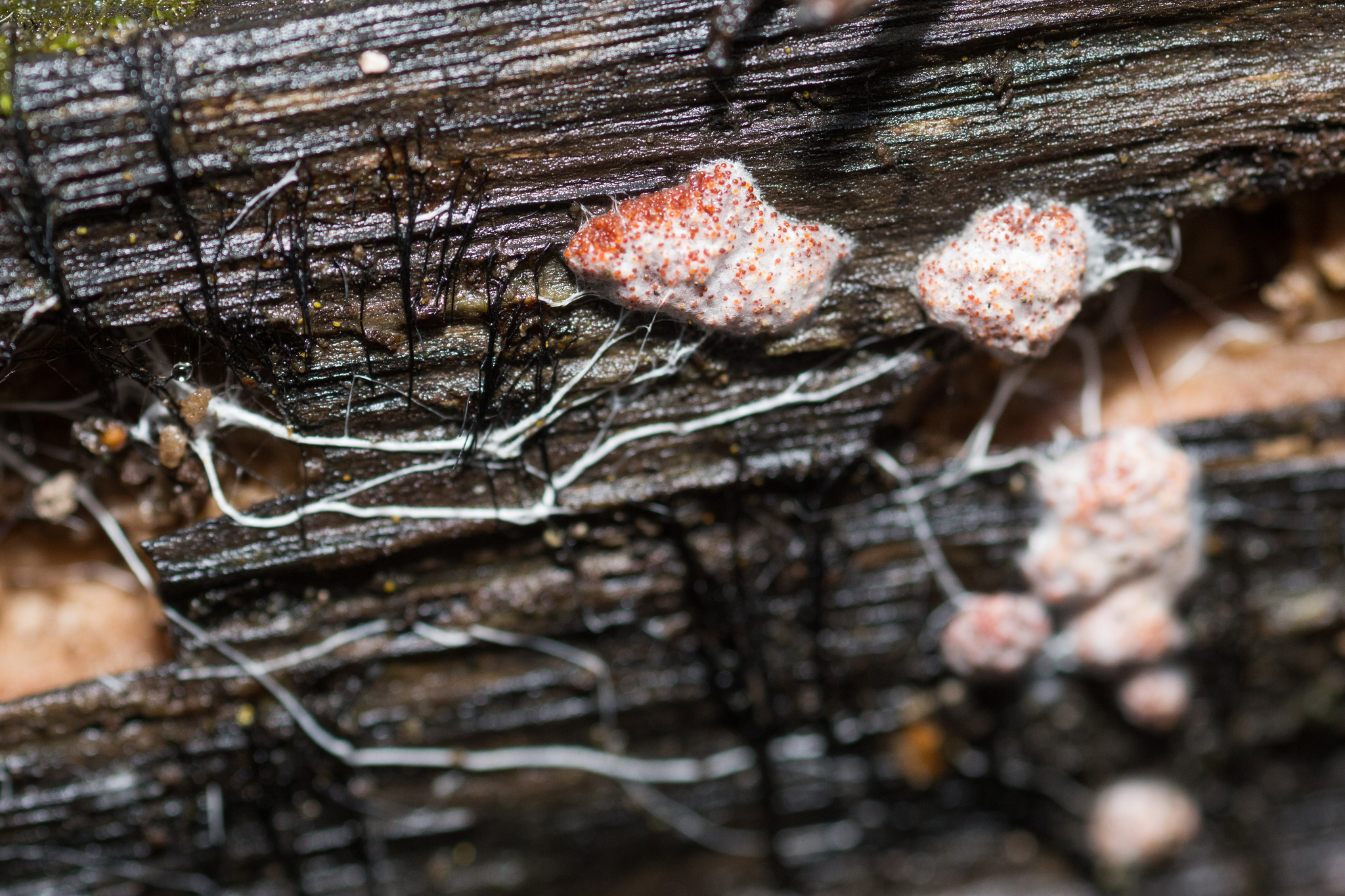
- Myriococcum praecox

Scientific classification
- Kingdom: Fungi
- Division: Basidiomycota
- Class: Agaricomycetes
- Order: Agaricales
- Family: Stephanosporaceae; Oberw. & E.Horak (1979)

Type genus
- Stephanospora Pat. (1914)

Genera
- Athelidium; Cristinia; Lindtneria; Mayamontana; Myriococcum; Stephanospora

= Stephanosporaceae =

Family of fungi

The Stephanosporaceae are a family of fungi in the order Agaricales. Species in the family are gasteroid or corticioid, growing on the ground or on rotting wood or plant debris.
