= Pucciniosiraceae =

Scientific classification
- Kingdom: Fungi
- Division: Basidiomycota
- Class: Pucciniomycetes
- Order: Pucciniales
- Family: Pucciniosiraceae (Dietel) Cummins & Y. Hirats.

Type genus
- Pucciniosira Lagerh.

Family of fungi

The Pucciniosiraceae are a family of rust fungi in the order Pucciniales. The family contains 10 genera and 57 species.

In 2018, they were placed within the Uredinales order (which was a previous name for the Pucciniales). They are 'endocyclic rusts', species with endocyclic life cycles and having reduced autoecious life cycles (they complete their life cycle on a single host species), in which the aeciospores function as teliospores.

== Genera ==
As accepted by Species Fungorum;

- Alveolaria - 2 spp.
- Baeodromus - 6 spp.
- Ceratocoma - 1 sp. (Ceratocoma jacksoniae (Henn. ex McAlpine) Buriticá & J.F. Hennen (1991))
- Chardoniella - 4 spp.
- Cionothrix - 6 spp.
- Didymopsora - 6 spp.
- Dietelia - 12 spp.
- Gambleola - 1 sp. (Gambleola cornuta Massee (1898))
- Pucciniosira - 15 spp.
- Trichopsora - 1 sp. (Trichopsora tournefortiae Lagerh. (1891))
