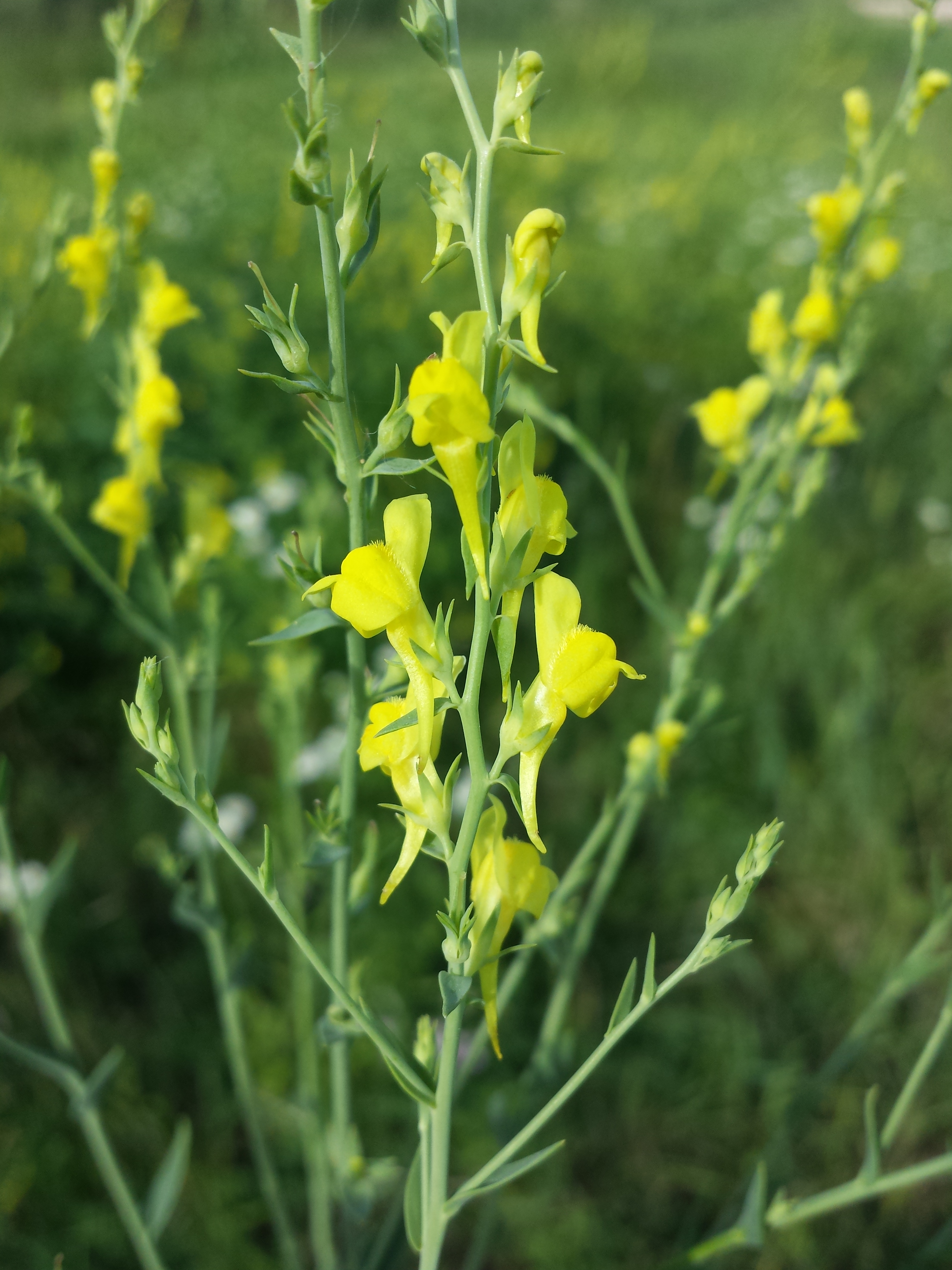

Scientific classification
- Kingdom: Plantae
- Clade: Tracheophytes
- Clade: Angiosperms
- Clade: Eudicots
- Clade: Asterids
- Order: Lamiales
- Family: Plantaginaceae
- Genus: Linaria
- Species: L. genistifolia

Binomial name
- Linaria genistifolia (L.) Mill.

= Linaria genistifolia =

Species of flowering plant

Linaria genistifolia is a species of flowering plant belonging to the family Plantaginaceae.

Its native range is from Europe to southwestern Siberia and China.
