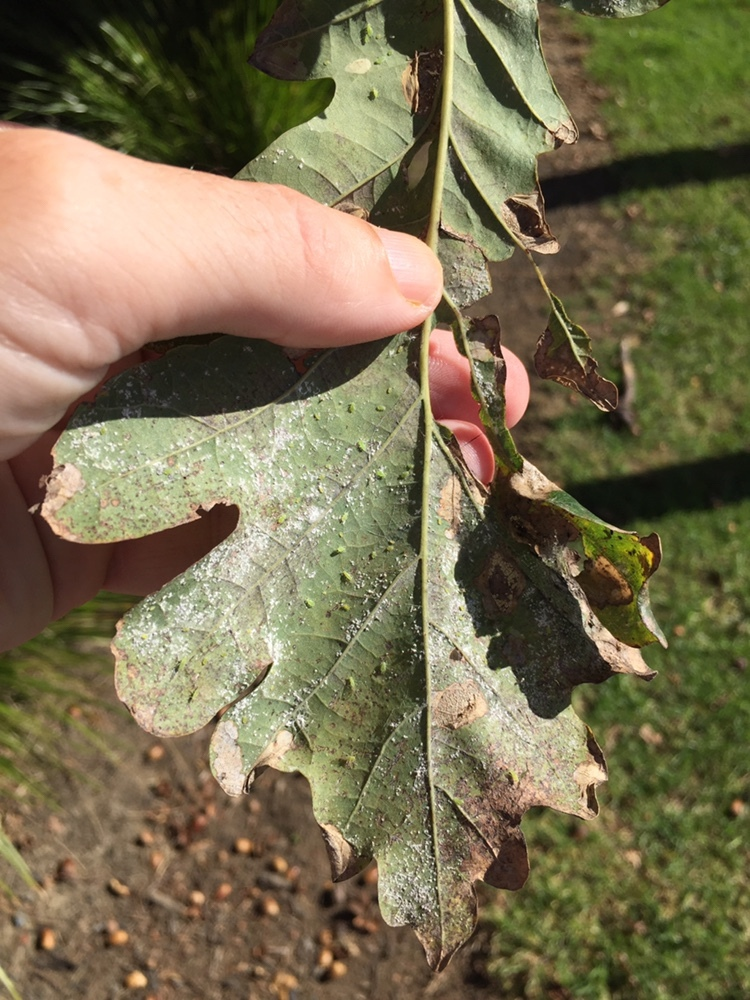
- Microstroma album

Scientific classification
- Kingdom: Fungi
- Division: Basidiomycota
- Class: Exobasidiomycetes
- Order: Microstromatales; R.Bauer & Oberw. (1997)

Families
- Microstromataceae; Quambalariaceae; Volvocisporiaceae

= Microstromatales =

Order of fungi

The Microstromatales are order of fungi in the class Exobasidiomycetes. The order consists of three families: the Microstromataceae, the Quambalariaceae, and the Volvocisporiaceae.
