= Kálmán Vánky =

Mycologist (1930–2021)

Kálmán Géza Vánky
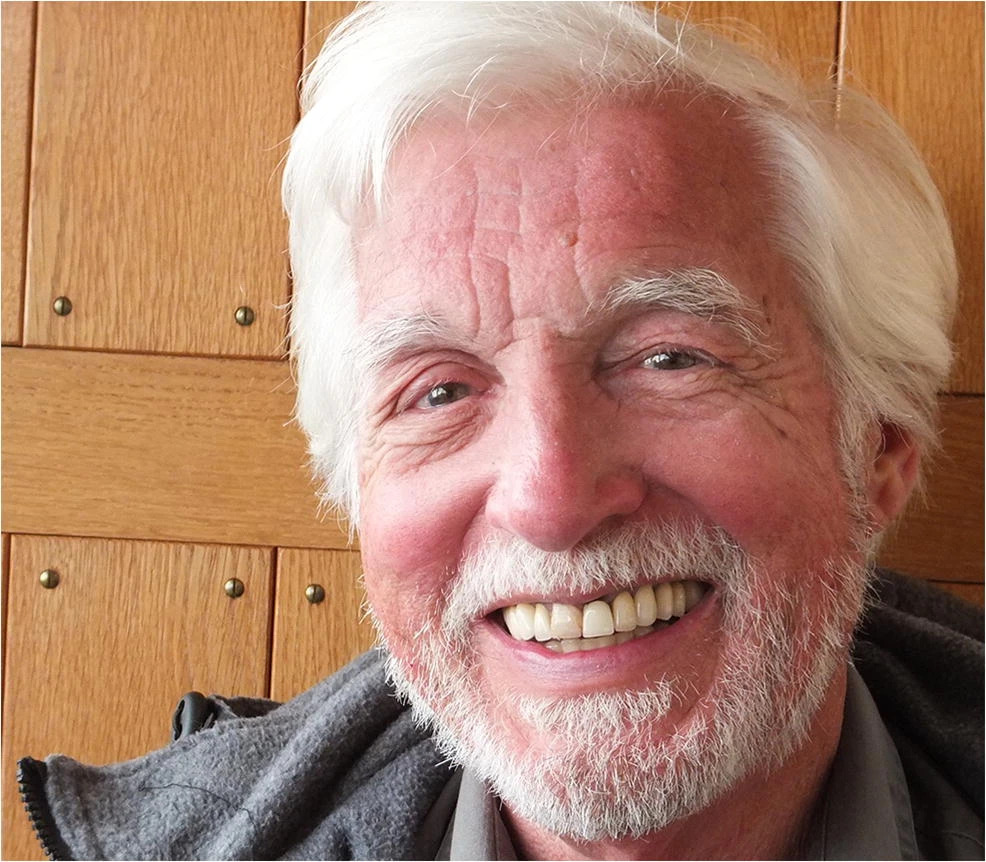
- Born: 15 June 1930; Odorheiu Secuiesc, Romania
- Died: 18 October 2021 (aged 91)
- Citizenship: Swedish, Hungarian
- Education: University of Bucharest, Uppsala University
- Known for: Mycology of Ustilaginomycetes
- Awards: Honorary member of the Hungarian Academy of Sciences 2001, Pázmány Dénes Award 2012, Arany János medal of the Hungarian Academy of Science 2014
- Scientific career
- Fields: Mycology
- Workplaces: University of Tübingen
- Author abbrev. (botany): Vánky

Kálmán Géza Vánky (15 June 1930 – 18 October 2021) was a Hungarian mycologist with Swedish and Hungarian citizenship, who lived in Germany. He was considered to be the worldwide authority on the subject of smut fungi and has dominated the taxonomic study of Ustilaginomycetes for at least the past four decades.

== Early life and education ==
Vánky was born in Odorheiu Secuiesc (Székelyudvarhely), Romania on 15 June 1930. He attended the Bethlen János Reformed School and, after it closed in 1945, the United Grammar School in Odorhei until 1949. He then began his studies at the University of Cluj (Kolozsvár) in Hungarian but completed his degree in biology at the University of Bucharest in 1953.

== Early career ==
Between 1953 and 1957 Vánky worked as a researcher with Professor Traian Săvulescu at the Department of Phytopathology of the Agricultural Research Institute, Bucharest, Romania, where he began studying smut fungi. However – as he always wanted to be a physician – in 1957 he left Bucharest for the Faculty of Medicine, Tîrgu-Mureş (Marosvásárhely), Romania, where he obtained his MD in 1961. From 1961 until 1964 he worked as a general practitioner in Odorhei (Székelyudvarhely), then, until 1969, he worked as a balneologist in Borszék but continued studying and collecting smut fungi.

In 1969 he left Ceauşescu's Romania and settled in Sweden, where he obtained the Swedish MD and worked as a family physician in Gagnef village. He continued to pursue and personally fund his research in the field of smut fungus taxonomy and obtained his PhD in taxonomic botany at Uppsala University in 1985 (under supervision of Prof. Jan Axel Nannfeldt). His doctoral thesis, Carpathian Ustilaginales, was published in the academic journal Symbolae Botanicae Upsalienses.

== Professional mycology ==
In 1986 Vánky obtained a one-year DFG-scholarship in Germany and worked in the field of smut fungus taxonomy at the University of Tübingen, Institute of Botany, Department of Special Botany and Mycology (with Prof. Franz Oberwinkler). As the scholarship was extended successively, he decided to focus his career on mycology rather than medicine. He continued to work at the university until his retirement in 1995.

== Death ==
Vánky died on 18 October 2021, at the age of 91.

== Publications ==
By 2014 Vánky had published 232 scientific papers and 10 books on smut fungi. His monograph Smut Fungi of the World, published in 2012 by (APS Press) was described as “a culmination of more than 50 years of dedicated work and passion for smut fungi.” The nearly 1500 page monograph has been described as the "Holy Book of Smut Fungi", because it comprises the description of the 1700 known species with their synonyms, important literature, their host plants and over 3.500 illustrations of which 650 are the author's drawings of smutted plants.

The third edition of his Illustrated Genera of Smut Fungi was published in 2013. In this edition, 104 recognized genera of smut fungi are presented, described and illustrated, compared to the second edition, in which 77 genera are identified.

== Collections ==
Both before and after retirement, Vánky travelled widely, collecting and investigating smut fungi in about 55 countries all over the world. The collecting trips were very often combined with national or international workshops, conferences or congresses in the field of mycology, where he was lecturer or speaker. Between 1989 and 2009 his German wife, Christine, helped him in collecting and taking photos of smutted plants.

Over 60 years Vánky amassed the largest smut fungus collection in the world, Herbarium Ustilaginales Vánky (HUV), containing over 22,000 samples. In August 2013 it was relocated to the Queensland Plant Pathology Herbarium, Brisbane, Australia (‘BRIP’), and placed at the disposal of the mycological community.

Vánky lectured in Hungary. He donated a complete set (no. 1–1350) of his Smut fungus exsiccata series Ustilaginales exsiccata, issued between 1975 and 2009, and several hundreds of duplicates, between them numerous precious isotypes, as well as all of his smut fungus books and publications to the Hungarian Natural History Museum.

== Interviews, awards and honours ==
In June 1996 an interview with Vánky entitled "Egy világutazó székely füvész" (A world travelling Székely botanist) was published in A Természet Világa (The World of Nature). The Romanian journal Moeszia - Erdélyi Gombász (Transylvanian Mycologist) published two interviews and a laudation on the Székely-Hungarian scientist. In 2012 he was awarded the "Pázmány Dénes Award" of the 'Kálmán László Mycological Society', Transylvania (Romania). and in 2014 awarded with "Arany János medal" of the 'Hungarian Academy of Science'.

Two new genera of smut fungi, Vankya and Kalmanago, was named in his honour and several new species Orphanomyces vankyi Savile (1974), Anthracoidea vankyi Nannfeldt (1977), Uromyces vankyorum R. Berndt (2002), Tilletia vankyi Carris & Castlebury (2007) and Macalpinomyces vankyi Y.M. Li, R.G. Shivas, McTaggart & L. Cai (2017) were named for him.

He became honorary member of the Hungarian Academy of Sciences in the Biological Sciences section in 2001.

== See also ==
- List of mycologists
