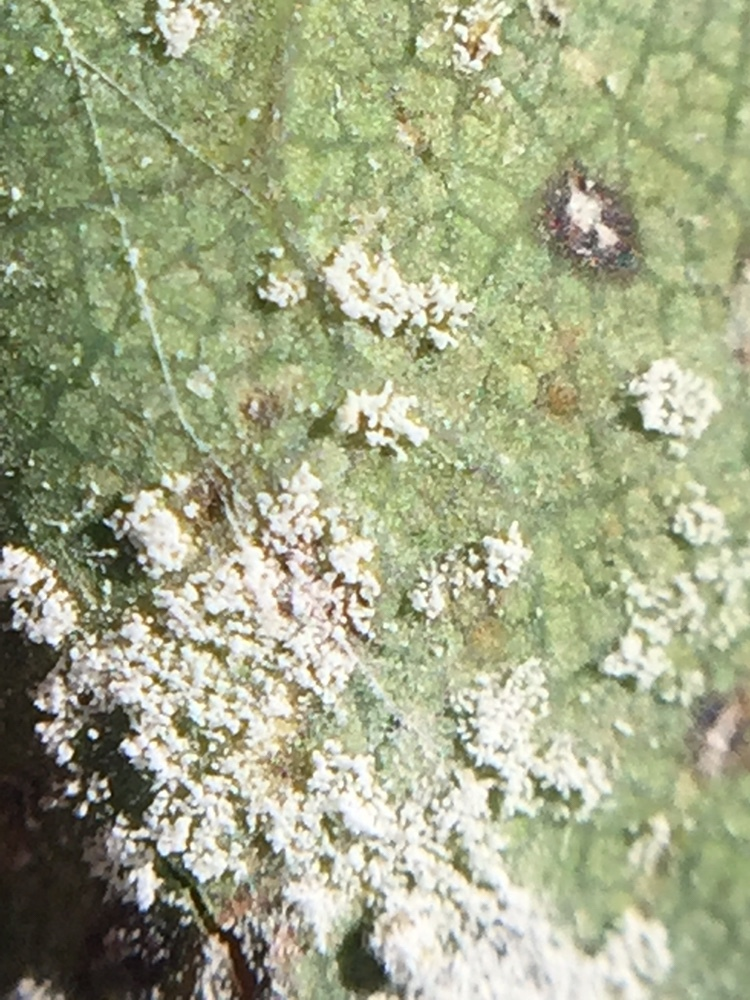
- Microstroma album

Scientific classification
- Kingdom: Fungi
- Division: Basidiomycota
- Class: Exobasidiomycetes
- Order: Microstromatales
- Family: Microstromataceae; Jülich (1981)

Type genus
- Microstroma Niessl (1861)

Genera
- Microstroma; Sympodiomycopsis

= Microstromataceae =

Family of fungi

The Microstromataceae are a family of fungi in the class Exobasidiomycetes. The family was circumscribed by Swiss mycologist Walter Jülich in 1986. Microstromataceae contains two genera (Microstroma and Sympodiomycopsis), which collectively contain five species.
