= Gasterella =

Scientific classification
- Kingdom: Fungi
- Division: Basidiomycota
- Class: Agaricomycetes
- Order: Boletales
- Family: Gasterellaceae; Zeller (1948)
- Genus: Gasterella; Zeller & L.B.Walker (1935)
- Species: G. luteophila

Binomial name
- Gasterella luteophila Zeller & L.B.Walker (1935)

Family of fungi

The Gasterellaceae are a family of fungi in the order Boletales. The family contains a single genus Gasterella, which in turn contains the single species Gasterella luteophila, found in the USA. The genus and species were described by American mycologists Sanford Myron Zeller and Leva Belle Walker in 1935; the family by Zeller in 1948.
