= Protogaster =

Scientific classification
- Kingdom: Fungi
- Division: Basidiomycota
- Class: Agaricomycetes
- Order: Boletales
- Family: Protogastraceae; Zeller (1934)
- Genus: Protogaster; Thaxt. (1934)
- Species: P. rhizophilus

Binomial name
- Protogaster rhizophilus Thaxt. (1934)

Genus of fungi

Protogastraceae is a family of fungi in the order Boletales that contains the single genus Protogaster. The genus, in turn, contains a single species, Protogaster rhizophilus, found on the roots of Viola in the US. The family was described by American mycologist Sanford Myron Zeller in 1934, and the genus and species by Roland Thaxter.
