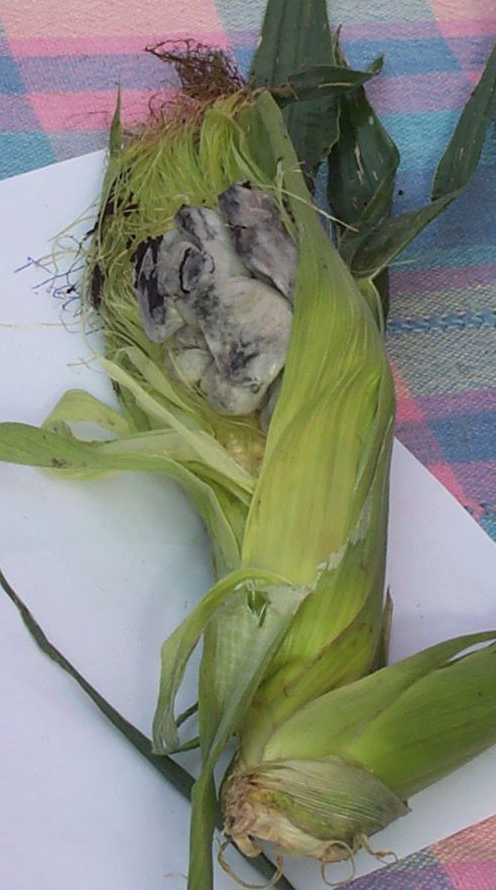
- Huitlacoche

Scientific classification
- Kingdom: Fungi
- Division: Basidiomycota
- Class: Ustilaginomycetes
- Subclass: Ustilaginomycetidae
- Order: Ustilaginales (G. Winter 1880) Bauer & Oberwinkler 1997

Families
- Anthracoideaceae; Clintamraceae; Geminaginaceae; Melanotaeniaceae; Pericladiaceae; Uleiellaceae; Ustilaginaceae; Websdaneaceae

= Ustilaginales =

Order of fungi

The Ustilaginales are an order of fungi within the class Ustilaginomycetes. The order contained 8 families, 49 genera, and 851 species in 2008.

In 2011, monotypic family Pericladiaceae Vánky holding just Pericladium Pass. (with 3 species) was added. Also family Cintractiellaceae Vánky was later placed in a monotypic order Cintractiellales McTaggart & R.G. Shivas in 2020.

Ustinaginales is also known and classified as the smut fungi. They are serious plant pathogens, with only the dikaryotic stage being obligately parasitic.

== Morphology ==
Has a thick-walled resting spore (teliospore), known as the "brand" (burn) spore or chlamydospore.

== Economic importance ==
They can infect corn plants (Zea mays) producing tumor-like galls that render the ears unsaleable. This corn smut, is also known as huitlacoche and sold canned for consumption in Latin America.

== Sexual reproduction ==
Almost all Ustilaginales species share a dimorphic life cycle that includes an asexual, saprophitic yeast-like stage and a filamentous sexual stage that is required to parasitize a host. The parasitic phase involves karyogamy, the process of fusing two haploid nuclei (present in haploid teliospore cells), followed by meiosis. Each meiosis results in a septated basidium bearing four haploid basidiospores which can then proceed to yeast-like growth. During meiosis, genes are expressed that function in recombination and DNA repair.
