= Rhynchogastremaceae =

Scientific classification
- Kingdom: Fungi
- Division: Basidiomycota
- Class: Tremellomycetes
- Order: Tremellales
- Family: Rhynchogastremaceae; Oberw. & B. Metzler (1989)

Genera
- Papiliotrema; Rhynchogastrema

Genus of fungi

The Rhynchogastremaceae are a family of fungi in the order Tremellales. The family currently contains two genera. Some species produce filamentous sexual states with septate basidia and are parasites of other fungi. Most, however, are only known from their yeast states.
