= Agaricostilbales =

Scientific classification
- Kingdom: Fungi
- Division: Basidiomycota
- Class: Agaricostilbomycetes
- Order: Agaricostilbales; Oberw. & R. Bauer (1989)

Families
- Agaricostilbaceae; Chionosphaeraceae; Crittendeniaceae; Jianyuniaceae; Kondoaceae; Ruineniaceae

Order of fungi

The Agaricostilbales are an order of fungi in the class Agaricostilbomycetes. The order consists of six families and 15 genera.

Agaricostilbales was originally described in 1989 by Franz Oberwinkler and Robert Bauer with just two families, the Agaricostilbaceae and the Chionosphaeraceae. Molecular research, based on cladistic analysis of DNA sequences, has subsequently added additional families.

Many species are known only from their yeast states. Where known, basidiocarps (fruitbodies) are small and stilboid (pin-like). Species in the family Crittendeniaceae are lichenicolous.
