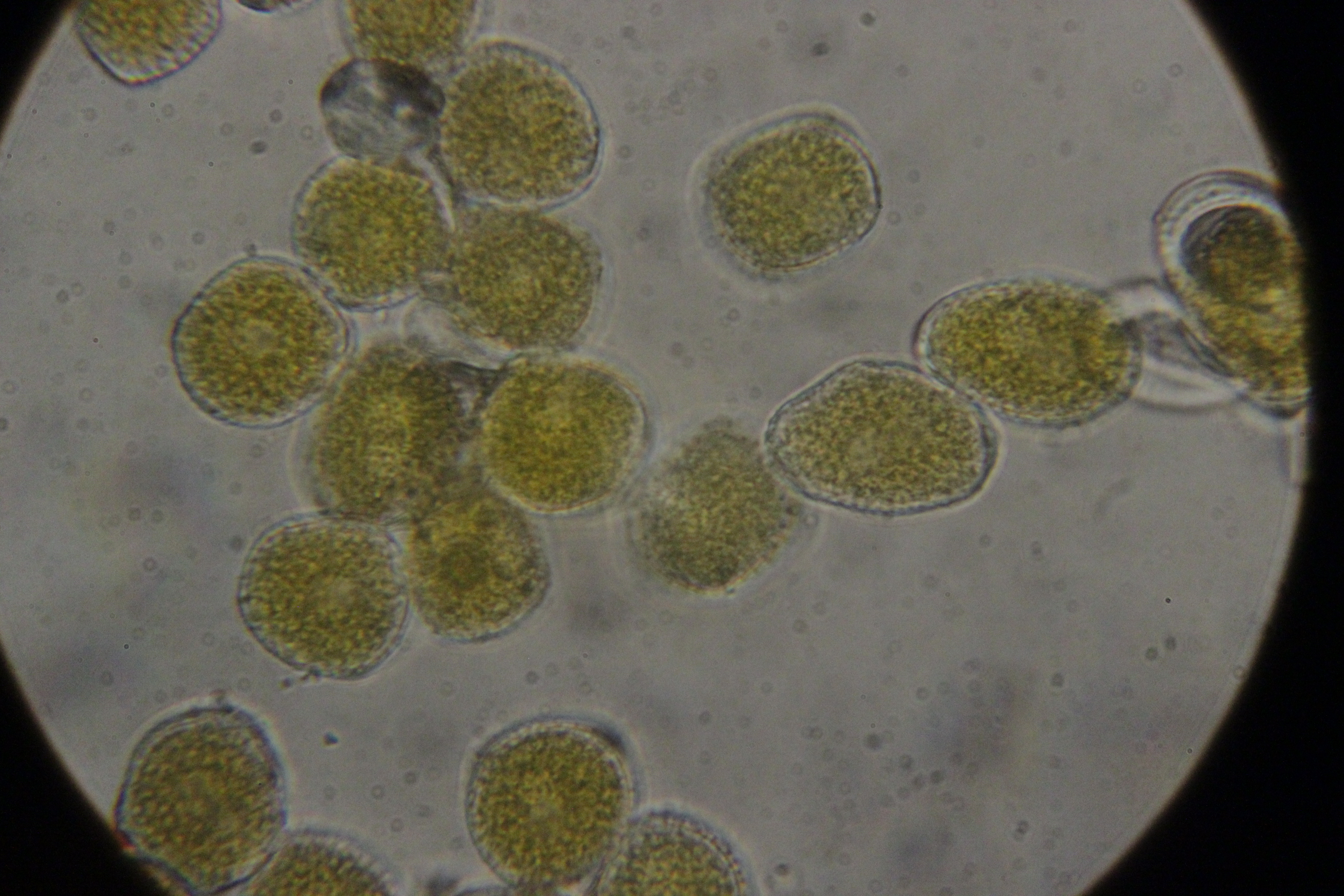
- Phragmidium bulbosum

Scientific classification
- Kingdom: Fungi
- Division: Basidiomycota
- Subdivision: Pucciniomycotina
- Class: Agaricostilbomycetes; R.Bauer, Begerow, J.P.Samp., M.Weiss & Ober. (2006)

Orders
- Agaricostilbales

= Agaricostilbomycetes =

Class of fungi

The Agaricostilbomycetes are a class of fungi in the subdivision Pucciniomycotina of the Basidiomycota. The class consists of a single order, six families, and 15 genera. Its type genus, Agaricostilbum was originally placed in Ascomycota, and later, Agaricomycotina, before being placed in Pucinniomycotina.

Most species are known only from their yeast states. Where known, basidiocarps (fruitbodies) are typically small and stilboid (pin-shaped). They tend to by mycoparasitic (parasitise other fungi) or saprobic. Their spindle pole bodies (fungal organelles that are functionally equivalent to centrosomes) are multi-layered and disc-shaped. They can have phragmo- or holo-basidia and they have tremelloid haustoria. The septal pores, have microbodies, which may resemble Woronin bodies of the Ascomycota.
