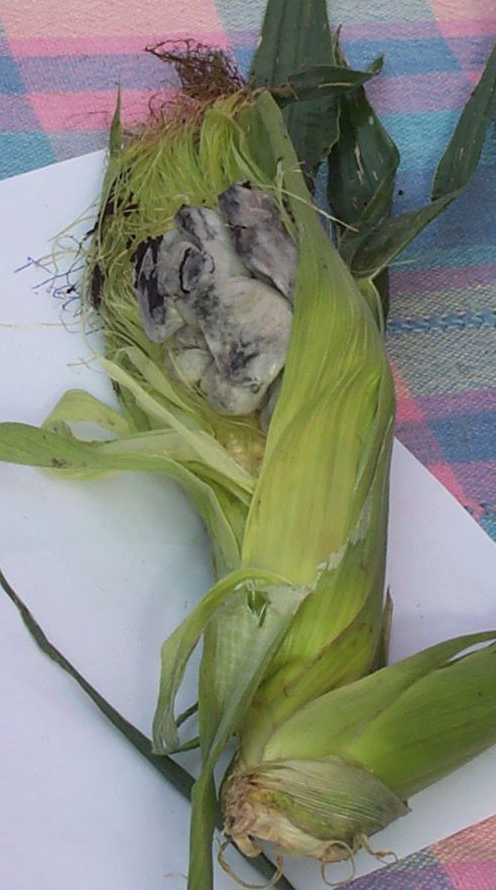
- Huitlacoche

Scientific classification
- Domain: Eukaryota
- Kingdom: Fungi
- Division: Basidiomycota
- Subdivision: Ustilaginomycotina
- Class: Ustilaginomycetes; R.Bauer, Oberw. & Vánky (1997)

Orders
- Urocystidales; Ustilaginales

= Ustilaginomycetes =

Class of fungi

Ustilaginomycetes is the class of true smut fungi. They are plant parasites with about 1400 recognised species in 70 genera. They have a simple septum with a septal pore cap, this is different from Agaricomycotina which has a dolipore septum with parenthoesome. The group is monophyletic (has a common ancestor).
