= Mathieu Tillet =

French botanist (1714–1791)

Mathieu Tillet (10 November 1714 Bordeaux - 13 December 1791) was a French botanist, agronomist, metallurgist and administrator.

== Life ==
He was the son of the goldsmith Gabriel Tillet and began studying metals at his father's workshop. In 1740 he was appointed Director of the Mint at Troyes. Ten years later he published his first book, about alloys. In 1750, he was awarded a prize by the Academy of Bordeaux for his research concerning the plagues of cereals, especially wheat. In 1755, he published the results of his research as Dissertation sur la cause qui corrompt et noircit les grains de blé dans les épis; et sur les moyens de prévenir ces accidents (Explanation of the cause that corrupts and blackens the grains of wheat in the ears; and the means to prevent these accidents), and was awarded another prize for it. The fungus Tilletia tritici, which he describes in this work, was named after him a century later by Charles and Louis Tulasne. In 1756 he resigned from his post at the Mint at Troyes and moved to Paris, living on Rue du Cloître-Notre-Dame.

On 9 September 1758, he was admitted to the French Academy of Sciences as a botanist. He occupied several offices at the academy over the next decades, finally becoming Treasurer in 1788, after the death of his predecessor Buffon.

In 1760 and 1761 he traveled around the Angoumois, researching yet another cereal plague together with his friend and fellow agronomist Henri-Louis Duhamel du Monceau. The result of this was the book Histoire d'un insecte qui devore les grains de l'Angoumois (History of an Insect that Devours the Grains of the Angoumois, published by H. L. Guérin & L. F. Delatour, Paris, 1762).

In 1766 he was charged with the making of 24 copies of the Toise de l'Academie, the official measuring unit of length in the Kingdom of France, and their distribution to the main French cities of the time.

In 1767 he was appointed Inspector-General of the Mint, a post he held until 1774 when he was succeeded by the Marquis de Condorcet. In 1773 he became a Knight of the Order of Saint Michael.

In 1784 he became the General Administrator of the Salpêtrière. It was during his administration that the Comtesse de la Motte was imprisoned there for her participation in the Affair of the diamond necklace, and escaped.

He was a member of commissions of the Academy of Sciences appointed in 1790 to advise the National Constituent Assembly on a new currency and on new weights and measures. He, with Jean-Charles de Borda, Joseph Louis Lagrange, Antoine Lavoisier and the Marquis de Condorcet presented a report on 27 October 1790 advising that weights and measures, as well as currency, adopt decimal divisions.

In 1847 botanists Edmond Tulasne and Charles Tulasne circumscribed Tilletia, which is a genus of smut fungi in the Tilletiaceae family and is named in Tillet's honour.

== Sources ==
- Alexander Lernet-Holenia: Das Halsband der Königin (The Queen's Necklace, Paul Zsolnay Verlag, Hamburg/Vienna, 1962, historical study on the affair of the diamond necklace, with a chapter on the life of Mathieu Tillet, and describing his role in the escape of the Comtesse de la Motte from prison)
- Short bio in French
