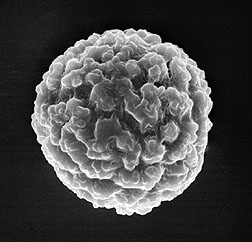
- Tilletia walkeri spore

Scientific classification
- Kingdom: Fungi
- Division: Basidiomycota
- Class: Exobasidiomycetes
- Order: Tilletiales
- Family: Tilletiaceae
- Genus: Tilletia
- Species: T. walkeri

Binomial name
- Tilletia walkeri Castl. & Carris (1999)

= Ryegrass bunt =

Species of fungus

Tilletia walkeri is a species of fungus in the Tilletiaceae family. It causes the disease Ryegrass bunt, which affects ryegrass. The fungus is related to those causing Karnal bunt in wheat. The species was described in 1999.
