= Tilletia controversa =

Scientific classification
- Domain: Eukaryota
- Kingdom: Fungi
- Division: Basidiomycota
- Class: Exobasidiomycetes
- Order: Tilletiales
- Family: Tilletiaceae
- Genus: Tilletia
- Species: T. controversa

Binomial name
- Tilletia controversa J.G. Kühn, (1874)

Synonyms
- Tilletia brevifaciens G.W. Fisch., (1952); Tilletia nanifica (F. Wagner) Savul., (1956); Tilletia tritici var. controversa (J.G. Kühn) Kawchuk, (1988); Tilletia tritici-nanifica F. Wagner, (1950)

Pathogenic fungus

Tilletia controversa is a fungal plant pathogen. It is a fungus known to cause the smut disease TCK smut in soft white and hard red winter wheats. It stunts the growth of the plants and leaves smut balls in the grain heads. When the grain is milled the smut balls emit a fishy odor that lowers the quality of the flour.

TCK smut exists in the western and northwestern United States, but is not considered a major problem. The disease took on policy significance because China applied a zero tolerance on the presence of TCK spores, resulting in a ban from 1974 to 1999 on shipments from the Pacific Northwest. Until the summer of 1996, China accepted shipments of U.S. wheat from the Gulf Coast, and negotiated price discounts with the shippers to cover the cost of decontamination if traces of TCK were found. Then in June 1996, China rejected all cargoes of U.S. wheat with traces of TCK. The November 1999 U.S.-China Agricultural Cooperation Agreement removes the ban and allows imports of U.S. wheat and other grains that meet a specific TCK tolerance level, thus improving the competitiveness of U.S. wheat with Canadian and Australian exports.

== Symptomology ==
Presents in the dough stage.
