= Tilletia horrida =

Scientific classification
- Domain: Eukaryota
- Kingdom: Fungi
- Division: Basidiomycota
- Class: Exobasidiomycetes
- Order: Tilletiales
- Family: Tilletiaceae
- Genus: Tilletia
- Species: T. horrida

Binomial name
- Tilletia horrida Takah., (1896)

Synonyms (Note: p. 115, "...described as or transferred to Neovossia (41), including ... T. horrida [as Neovossia horrida (Takah.) Padwick & A. Khan]. The distinction between Neovossia and Tilletia has been controversial.")
- Neovossia horrida (Takah.) Padwick & A. Khan, (1944)

Species of fungus

Tilletia horrida, rice kernel smut, caryopsis smut, black smut, or grain smut, is a fungal rice disease believed to only affect the Oryza genus. (Note: p. 125, "Under natural conditions, T. horrida has been reported only from rice (Oryza L.), but erroneous reports in the literature have led to considerable confusion over its host range and biology.") (Note: p. 126, "In tests of 32 species of grasses, T. horrida infected only rice and, surprisingly, the wheat relative Aegilops sharonensis (106). Whitney (143) showed in other tests that T. horrida infected rice, but not Pennisetum, and that seedling inoculations did not result in infection.") It presents as a partial bunt. (Note: p. 117, "Rice Kernel Smut—Tilletia horrida Rice kernel smut, also known as caryopsis smut, black smut, or grain smut (11), is caused by the pathogen T. horrida (Figure 5), which ... causes a partial bunt that affects both yield and quality.")

== Taxonomy ==
T. horrida has had a chaotic taxonomic history. It has been reclassified within Neovossia, and synonymised with congener T. barclayana. It has now been definitively de-synonymised from T. barclayana on the basis of molecular evidence. (Note: p. 126, "Tullis & Johnson (134) synonymized T. horrida with Tilletia barclayana (Bref.) Sacc. & Syd. based on questionable results of a study in which seedlings of two species of Pennisetum L.C. Rich. were artificially infected with the rice pathogen. Although the rice plants were not infected and the resulting teliospores from the inoculated species of Pennisetum were morphologically more similar to T. barclayana than to T. horrida, this was considered proof of synonymy (134). ... However, the synonymy of T. horrida with T. barclayana prevailed until molecular data proved the species were genetically distinct (25, 98).)

== Morphology ==
=== Teliospores ===
Diameter between 20 and 38 𝜇m. (Note: p. 117, "Teliospores can range from 20 to 38𝜇m in diameter.")

== Reproduction ==
Teliospores undergo dormancy. After 1 year, germination under perfect conditions is 50%, 15-30% normally. This is likely not due to dieoff but instead is a long-term dormancy which aids field persistence. (Note: p. 119, "Postharvest dormancy of teliospores also occurs in T. horrida (28). Even after teliospores are stored more than one year, germination rarely exceeds 50% under optimal laboratory conditions and is 15%—30% in most reports. This demonstrates the second type of dormancy, which is long-term and likely contributes to teliospore survival under field conditions.")

== Distribution ==
=== History of spread ===
First identified in Japan in 1896, it was found throughout East, Southeast, and South Asia a few years later. First detected in the United States in 1898 in Georgetown, South Carolina, likely imported on Japanese seed rice. First detected in the Philippines in 1920, also said to be from seed rice imports. (Note: p. 117, "...By the early 1900s, rice smut was considered widespread in eastern and southern Asia and had been reported in India, Java, Siam, and China (102). Anderson (1) discovered the disease in the United States in 1898 in rice plants from Georgetown, South Carolina, but misidentified the pathogen as Tilletia corona Scrib. He reported that the introduction of rice smut into South Carolina was via Japanese rice seed (2). Reyes (102) was the first to observe rice smut in the Philippines in 1920, apparently introduced on rice seed.")

=== Present distribution ===
T. horrida is a low-level, pervasive problem everywhere rice is grown. (Note: p. 117, "Rice kernel smut is considered a persistent but minor disease throughout rice-growing regions of the world (11, 26, 91).") It is especially known from Asia, Australasia, Oceania, Greece, Belize, Cuba, Nicaragua, Panama, Trinidad, Brazil, Guyana, Suriname, Venezuela, Mexico, the United States (most severely in Arkansas, Mississippi, Missouri, and also in California, Louisiana, South Carolina, Texas), Sierra Leone. Possibly Senegal. (Note: p. 117, "Today, rice kernel smut occurs throughout Asia, Australasia and Oceania, in Europe (Greece), Central America (Belize, Cuba, Nicaragua, Panama, and Trinidad), South America (Brazil, Guyana, Surinam, Venezuela), North America (Mexico, United States), and Sierra Leone in Africa (31, 142). A specimen from Senegal, West Africa in Herb. BPI (41) on "Oryza sp." suggests the pathogen may be more widespread in Africa than is indicated in current distribution maps. In the United States, rice kernel smut occurs throughout rice-growing regions in Arkansas, California, Louisiana, Mississippi, South Carolina, and Texas (31, 141). In general, it is more severe in Arkansas, Mississippi, and Missouri than in other U.S. rice-growing regions (56).")

== Disease ==
Long-grain cultivars are the most susceptible, short the least, and medium in between. This is a problem in the United States where most cultivation is long-grain. (Note: p. 117, "In general, long-grain rice cultivars, the predominant type grown in the United States, are most susceptible to T. horrida, with short-grain rice the least susceptible, and medium-grain rice intermediate in susceptibility (11). Rice containing more than 3% bunted kernels is graded "smutty" (135) and is penalized at the mill (56).") If seed rice is infected that is especially bad for production that uses that seed. (Note: p. 117, "Disease incidence as high as 87% and 100% in hybrid rice seed production fields have been reported in Pakistan and China, respectively, although average infection rates in "normal" years are generally less than 25% (11). Even a low incidence of infection can cause substantial economic losses in hybrid rice seed production because a maximum of 0.5% infection is allowed in certified seed in India (11).")

There are few hosts other than Oryzae. Even other grasses are non-hosts, except surprisingly for the wild wheat Aegilops sharonensis.

== Economic impact ==
T. horrida is a low-level, pervasive problem everywhere rice is grown. Infection can also occur further back in the production chain, on seed farms. In Pakistan and China the seed infection rate is less than 25% usually, but in Pakistan 87% and China 100% have been recorded. Indian seed farmers have suffered financially at times due to the normal, low level of infection, because India has a certification system which requires a very low 0.5% maximum.
