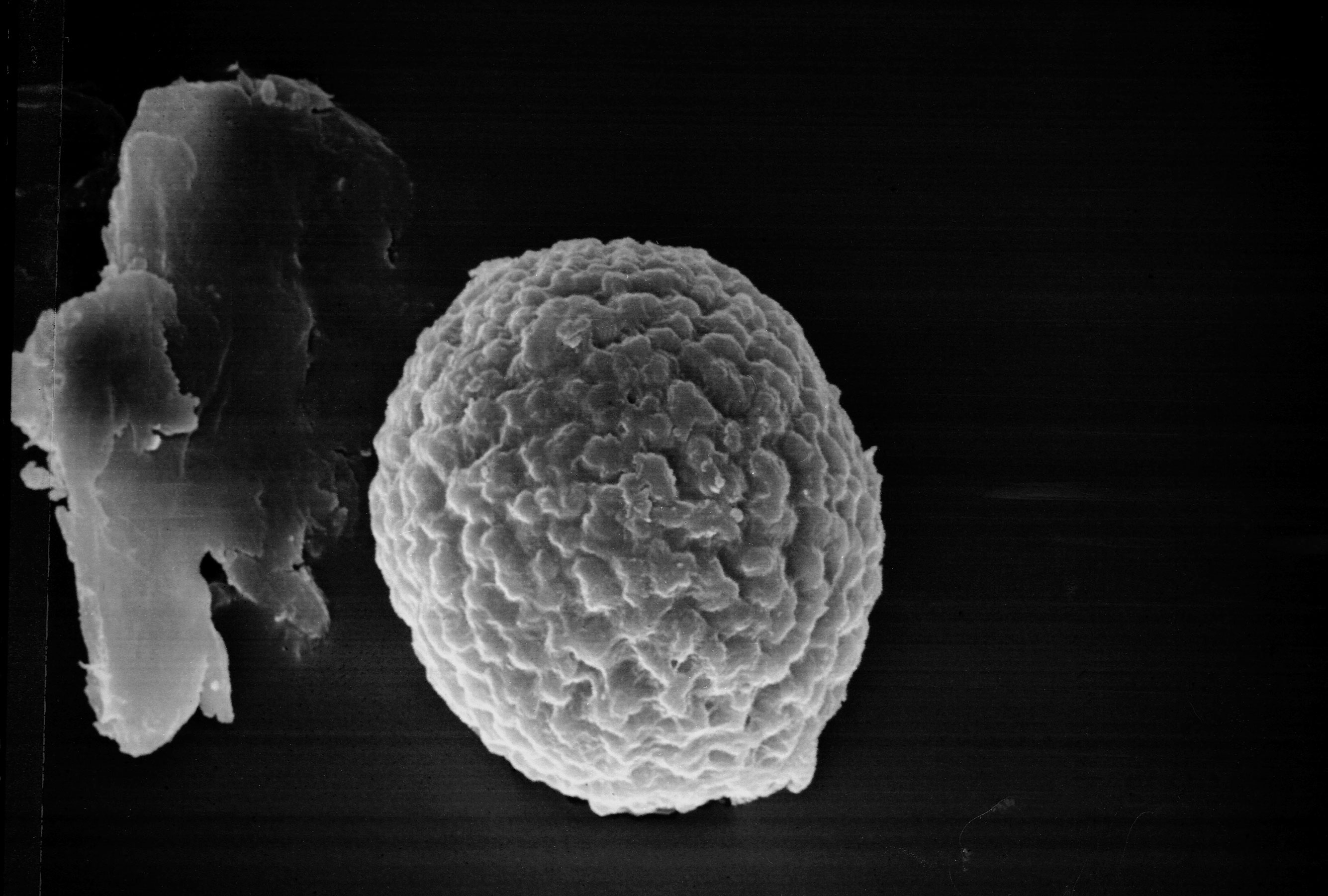
- Teliospore of Tilletia indica

Scientific classification
- Kingdom: Fungi
- Division: Basidiomycota
- Class: Exobasidiomycetes
- Order: Tilletiales
- Family: Tilletiaceae
- Genus: Tilletia; Tul. & C.Tul.

Type species
- Tilletia caries (DC.) Tul. & C.Tul.

= Tilletia =

Genus of fungi

Tilletia is a genus of smut fungi in the Tilletiaceae family. Species in this genus are plant pathogens that affect various grasses. Tilletia indica, which causes Karnal bunt of wheat, and Tilletia horrida, responsible for rice kernel smut, are examples of species that affect economically important crops.

The widespread genus contains about 175 species. The genus was circumscribed by Edmond Tulasne and Charles Tulasne in Ann. Sci. Nat. Bot. ser.3, vol.7 on page 112 in 1847.

The genus was named after a agronomist from France, Mathieu Tillet (1714–1791).

== Species ==
As accepted by Species Fungorum;

- Tilletia abscondita Syd. & P. Syd. (1903)
- Tilletia acroceratis Vánky (2004)
- Tilletia aegopogonis Durán (1971)
- Tilletia ahmadiana Pavgi & Mundk. (1949)
- Tilletia airae-caespitosae Lindr. (1904)
- Tilletia airina Syd. (1937)
- Tilletia alopecuri (Sawada) L. Ling (1949)
- Tilletia anthoxanthi A. Blytt (1896)
- Tilletia apludae Thirum. & Mishra (1953)
- Tilletia aristidae Vánky (2002)
- Tilletia arthraxonis A.R. Patil, T.M. Patil & M.S. Patil (2006)
- Tilletia arundinellae L. Ling (1945)
- Tilletia asperifolia Ellis & Everh. ex Sacc. (1888)
- Tilletia asperifolioides G.W. Fisch. (1952)
- Tilletia australiensis R.G. Shivas, et al. (2008)
- Tilletia avenastri Vánky (2011)
- Tilletia baldratii Montem. (1934)
- Tilletia bambusae Thirum. & Pavgi (1968)
- Tilletia banarasae Pavgi & Thirum. (1956)
- Tilletia bangalorensis Pavgi & Thirum. (1956)
- Tilletia barclayana (Bref.) Sacc. & P. Syd. (1899)
- Tilletia beckerae (Henn.) Vánky (2007)
- Tilletia belgradensis Magnus (1908)
- Tilletia biharica Thirum. & Pavgi (1953)
- Tilletia bolayi H. Zogg (1972)
- Tilletia boliviana M. Piepenbr. (2001)
- Tilletia boliviensis Liro (1939)
- Tilletia bornmuelleri Magnus (1903)
- Tilletia boutelouae Durán (1987)
- Tilletia buchloëana Kellerman and Swingle (1889)
- Tilletia brachiariae (Pavgi & Thirum.) Vánky (1997)
- Tilletia brachypodii-mexicani Vánky (1995)
- Tilletia brachypodii-ramosi H. Zogg (1967)
- Tilletia brefeldii Vánky (2004)
- Tilletia bromi (Brockm.) Brockm. (1864)
- Tilletia bromina Maire (1929)
- Tilletia bromi-tectorum Urries (1943)
- Tilletia bungalorense Thirum. & Pavgi (1956)
- Tilletia cape-yorkensis Vánky & R.G. Shivas (2003)
- Tilletia caries (DC.) Tul. & C. Tul. (1847)
- Tilletia catapodii H. Scholz & Vánky (2001)
- Tilletia cathcartae Durán & G.W. Fisch. (1961)
- Tilletia cathesteci (Henn.) G.P. Clinton (1904)
- Tilletia cerebrina Ellis & Everh. ex Sacc. (1888)
- Tilletia challinorae McTaggart & R.G. Shivas (2009)
- Tilletia chiangmaiensis R.G. Shivas, Vánky & Athip. (2006)
- Tilletia chionachnes Vánky, C. Vánky & R.G. Shivas (2001)
- Tilletia chloridicola Cif. (1928)
- Tilletia chrysosplenium Höhn. (1904)
- Tilletia colombiana Vánky (1995)
- Tilletia controversa J.G. Kühn (1874)
- Tilletia corona Scribn. (1896)
- Tilletia courtetiana Har. & Pat. (1909)
- Tilletia cynodontis Vánky (2001)
- Tilletia cynosuri Massenot (1955)
- Tilletia dacamarae Unamuno (1942)
- Tilletia dactyloctenii Vánky (1995)
- Tilletia decamarae Unamuno (1940)
- Tilletia deyeuxiae L. Ling (1945)
- Tilletia digitariicola Pavgi & Thirum. (1952)
- Tilletia durangensis Durán (1971)
- Tilletia earlei Griffiths (1902)
- Tilletia echinochloae Lavrov (1951)
- Tilletia ehrhartae P.H.B. Talbot (1958)
- Tilletia eleusines Syd. (1934)
- Tilletia elizabethae T. Denchev & Denchev (2018)
- Tilletia elymandrae Vienn.-Bourg. (1958)
- Tilletia elymi Dietel & Holw. (1894)
- Tilletia elymicola Lavrov (1937)
- Tilletia elytrophori Dennis (1950)
- Tilletia eragrostidis G.P. Clinton & Ricker (1905)
- Tilletia eragrostiellae Vánky, C. Vánky & N.D. Sharma (1995)
- Tilletia eremopoae Vánky & H. Scholz (2001)
- Tilletia fahrendorfii Vienn.-Bourg. (1938)
- Tilletia festiva Syd. & P. Syd. (1912)
- Tilletia festuca-octoflorana Zundel (1942)
- Tilletia filisora R.G. Shivas, Vánky & Athip. (2006)
- Tilletia flectens Lagerh. (1900)
- Tilletia fusca Ellis & Everh. ex Sacc. (1888)
- Tilletia geeringii Ying M. Li & R.G. Shivas (2014)
- Tilletia gigacellularis Vánky (2004)
- Tilletia goloskokovii Schwarzman (1960)
- Tilletia guyotiana Har. (1900)
- Tilletia haynaldiae Maire (1927)
- Tilletia holci (Westend.) J. Schröt. (1877)
- Tilletia hordei Körn. (1877)
- Tilletia hordeina Ranoj. (1914)
- Tilletia hypsophila Speg. (1902)
- Tilletia imbecillis Vánky (2004)
- Tilletia indica Mitra (1931)
- Tilletia inolens McAlpine (1896)
- Tilletia intermedia (Gassner) Săvul. (1956)
- Tilletia iowensis (H.H. Hume & Hodson) Cif. (1963)
- Tilletia isachnes A.R. Patil, T.M. Patil & M.S. Patil (2006)
- Tilletia isachnicola R.G. Shivas, et al. (2008)
- Tilletia ischaemi Vánky & N.D. Sharma (2001)
- Tilletia ixophori Durán (1987)
- Tilletia japonica (Vánky) Denchev (2008)
- Tilletia kenyana Vánky (2004)
- Tilletia kimberleyensis Vánky & R.G. Shivas (2001)
- Tilletia kuznetzoviana Schwarzman (1960)
- Tilletia lachnagrostidis Vánky & R.G. Shivas (2007)
- Tilletia laevis J.G. Kühn (1873)
- Tilletia lageniformis Vánky, et al. (2006)
- Tilletia laguri Gui M. Zhang, G.X. Lin & J.R. Deng (1995)
- Tilletia lepturi Sigr. ex Cif. (1963)
- Tilletia lineata R.G. Shivas & Vánky (2001)
- Tilletia lolioli Vánky, Carris, Castl. & H. Scholz (2005)
- Tilletia lycuroides Durán & J.F. Hennen (1979)
- Tilletia lyei Vánky (2004)
- Tilletia maclaganii (Berk.) G.P. Clinton (1902)
- Tilletia macrotuberculata Durán (1987)
- Tilletia mactaggartii R.G. Shivas & Ying M. Li (2014)
- Tilletia madeirensis Syd. (1937)
- Tilletia majuscula R.G. Shivas & McTaggart (2008)
- Tilletia makutensis Thirum. & Safeeulla (1951)
- Tilletia marjaniae R.G. Shivas & Ying M. Li (2014)
- Tilletia mauritiana Vánky (2002)
- Tilletia melicae Vánky (2007)
- Tilletia menieri Har. & Pat. (1904)
- Tilletia mexicana Vánky (2005)
- Tilletia micrairae R.G. Shivas, et al. (2009)
- Tilletia microtuberculata Vánky (2004)
- Tilletia milii-vernalis Liro (1939)
- Tilletia montana Ellis & Everh. ex Sacc. (1888)
- Tilletia montemartinii Canonaco (1936)
- Tilletia muhlenbergiae G.P. Clinton (1906)
- Tilletia narasimhanii Thirum. & Safeeulla (1951)
- Tilletia narayanaraoana Mundk. & Thirum. (1951)
- Tilletia narduri Unamuno (1933)
- Tilletia nigrifaciens Langdon & Boughton (1978)
- Tilletia obscuroreticulata Durán (1987)
- Tilletia oklahomae Zundel (1939)
- Tilletia olida (Riess) G. Winter (1881)
- Tilletia opaca Syd. & P. Syd. (1913)
- Tilletia oplismeni-cristati Pat. & Har. ex Vánky (2004)
- Tilletia pachyderma G.W. Fisch. (1952)
- Tilletia pallida G.W. Fisch. (1938)
- Tilletia palpera J. Walker & Vánky (2001)
- Tilletia pancicii Bubák & Ranoj. (1909)
- Tilletia panici Mundk. (1941)
- Tilletia panici-humilis Pavgi & Thirum. (1955)
- Tilletia paradoxa Jacz. (1926)
- Tilletia paspali Zundel (1931)
- Tilletia patagonica (Hirschh.) Vánky (2004)
- Tilletia pennisetina Syd. (1929)
- Tilletia perotidis Thirum. & Pavgi (1952)
- Tilletia phalaridis Hirschh. (1945)
- Tilletia poae Nagorny (1926)
- Tilletia polypogonis Vánky & N.D. Sharma (1994)
- Tilletia poonensis Thirum. & Pavgi (1968)
- Tilletia prostrata (Lavrov) Lavrov (1951)
- Tilletia pseudochaetochloae R.G. Shivas & Vánky (2002)
- Tilletia pseudoraphidis R.G. Shivas & McTaggart (2008)
- Tilletia puccinelliae Carris, Castl. & G.M. Huang (2010)
- Tilletia puneana Vánky (2005)
- Tilletia redfieldiae G.P. Clinton (1906)
- Tilletia robeana Vánky (2002)
- Tilletia rostrariae Vánky & Ershad (2002)
- Tilletia rugispora Ellis (1893)
- Tilletia sabaudiae H. Zogg (1983)
- Tilletia salzmannii Maire (1937)
- Tilletia savilei Gandhe & Vánky (1993)
- Tilletia schenckiana Henn. (1906)
- Tilletia scrobiculata G.W. Fisch. (1952)
- Tilletia secalis (Corda) J.G. Kühn (1877)
- Tilletia sehimatis A.R. Patil, T.M. Patil & M.S. Patil (2006)
- Tilletia sehimicola R.G. Shivas & McTaggart (2008)
- Tilletia separata J. Kunze (1876)
- Tilletia serbica Ranoj. (1914)
- Tilletia sesleriae Juel (1894)
- Tilletia setariae L. Ling (1945)
- Tilletia setariae-palmiflorae Mishra (1957)
- Tilletia setariae-parviflorae Vánky & R.G. Shivas (2007)
- Tilletia setariae-pumilae Vánky & N.D. Sharma (2007)
- Tilletia setariae-viridis Vánky (2001)
- Tilletia setariicola Pavgi & Thirum. (1952)
- Tilletia shivasii Vánky (2007)
- Tilletia sleumeri (Petr.) Vánky (2007)
- Tilletia sphaerocarpa (Syd. & P. Syd.) Vánky (2007)
- Tilletia sphaerococca A.A. Fisch. Waldh. (1867)
- Tilletia sphenopodis Rayss (1946)
- Tilletia spinulosa Vánky, C. Vánky, R.G. Shivas & McTaggart (2009)
- Tilletia spodiopogonis A.R. Patil, T.M. Patil & M.S. Patil (2006)
- Tilletia sporoboli Vánky (2000)
- Tilletia sterilis Ule (1886)
- Tilletia subfusca H.H. Hume (1902)
- Tilletia sumatii (S.D. Patil & Gandhe) Vánky (1995)
- Tilletia taiana Mundk. (1941)
- Tilletia tanzanica Vánky (2002)
- Tilletia texana Long ex G.P. Clinton (1902)
- Tilletia thailandica Vánky & R.G. Shivas (2007)
- Tilletia themedae-anatherae Pavgi & Thirum. (1955)
- Tilletia themedicola Thirum. & Mishra (1953)
- Tilletia thirumalacharii Gandhe (1999)
- Tilletia togwateei Guillem. (1988)
- Tilletia trachypogonis Durán (1987)
- Tilletia transiliensis M.N. Kusnezowa & Schwarzman (1960)
- Tilletia transvaalensis Zundel (1931)
- Tilletia tripogonellae T. Denchev & Denchev (2018)
- Tilletia tripogonis A.R. Patil, T.M. Patil & M.S. Patil (2006)
- Tilletia triraphidis T. Denchev & Denchev (2018)
- Tilletia triticina Ranoj. (1914)
- Tilletia tritici-repentis (DC.) Liro (1935)
- Tilletia tuberculata Durán (1987)
- Tilletia tumefaciens Syd. & P. Syd. (1912)
- Tilletia vankyi Carris & Castl. (2007)
- Tilletia velenovskyi Bubák (1903)
- Tilletia ventenatae T. Denchev & Denchev (2018)
- Tilletia verrucosa Cooke & Massee (1888)
- Tilletia vetiveriae Pavgi & Thirum. (1956)
- Tilletia viennotii Syd. (1937)
- Tilletia vittata (Berk.) Mundk. (1941)
- Tilletia walkeri Castl. & Carris (1999)
- Tilletia whiteochloae R.G. Shivas & Vánky (2001)
- Tilletia wilcoxiana Griffiths (1904)
- Tilletia xerochloae R.G. Shivas, McTaggart & Vánky (2007)
- Tilletia yakirrae R.G. Shivas, McTaggart & Vánky (2007)
- Tilletia youngii G.P. Clinton & Zundel (1939)
- Tilletia zonata Bref. (1895)
- Tilletia zundelii Hirschh. (1943)
- Tilletiaria anomala Bandoni & B.N. Johri (1972)

Former species; Note: Assume if no family mentioned (at the end), Tilletiaceae

- T. alopecurivora Ule (1884) = Ustilago alopecurivora, Ustilaginaceae family
- T. arctica Rostr. (1886) = Orphanomyces arcticus, Anthracoideaceae
- T. ayresii Berk. (1899) = Conidiosporomyces ayresii
- T. brachypodii Mundk. (1944) = Neovossia brachypodii
- T. brunkii (Ellis & Galloway) Durán (1973) = Jamesdicksonia brunkii, Georgefischeriaceae
- T. buchloeana Kellerm. & Swingle (1889) = Salmacisia buchloeana
- T. bullata Fuckel (1870) = Microbotryum bistortarum, Microbotryaceae
- T. calamagrostidis Fuckel (1867) = Ustilago calamagrostidis, Ustilaginaceae
- T. commelinae Kom. (1899) = Kalmanago commelinae, Microbotryaceae
- T. corcontica Bubák (1912) = Ustilago corcontica, Ustilaginacea
- T. debaryana A.A. Fisch. Waldh. (1867) = Ustilago striiformis, Ustilaginaceae
- T. decipiens (Pers.) Körn. (1877) = Tilletia sphaerococca
- T. echinosperma Ainsw. (1941) = Conidiosporomyces echinospermus
- T. epiphylla Berk. & Broome (1883) = Puccinia sorghi, Pucciniaceae
- T. euphorbiae L.W. Lenz (1941) = Melanotaenium euphorbiae, Melanotaeniaceae
- T. externa Griffiths (1902) = Anthracoidea externa, Anthracoideaceae
- T. fischeri P. Karst. (1878) = Cintractia fischeri, Anthracoideaceae
- T. gigaspora Massee ex Zambett. (1971) = Anthracocystis masseeana, Ustilaginaceae
- T. heterospora Zundel (1938) = Conidiosporomyces ayresii
- T. hyalospora Massee (1899) = Ingoldiomyces hyalosporus
- T. hyalospora var. cuzcoensis Hirschh. (1944) = Ingoldiomyces hyalosporus
- T. hyparrheniae L. Ling (1953) = Conidiosporomyces ayresii
- T. irregularis Pazschke (1895) = Tolyposporella irregularis, Tilletiariaceae
- T. koeleriae Mundk. (1944) = Anthracoidea koeleriae, Anthracoideaceae
- T. magnusiana A.A. Fisch. Waldh. (1877) = Sporisorium magnusianum, Ustilaginaceae
- T. milii Fuckel (1870) = Ustilago milii, Ustilaginaceae
- T. mixta Massee (1899) = Anthracocystis mixta, Ustilaginaceae
- T. moliniae (Thüm.) G. Winter (1881) = Neovossia moliniae
- T. okudairae (Miyabe) L. Ling (1953) = Franzpetrakia okudairae, Ustilaginaceae
- T. oryzae Pat. (1887) = Ustilaginoidea virens, Clavicipitaceae
- T. rhei Zundel (1944) = Microbotryum rhei, Microbotryaceae
- T. salweyi (Berk. & Broome) P. Karst. (1884) = Ustilago striiformis, Ustilaginaceae
- T. serpens P. Karst. (1866) = Ustilago serpens, Ustilaginaceae
- T. sorghi (Ehrenb. ex Link) Rabenh. (1871) = Sporisorium sorghi, Ustilaginaceae
- T. sorghi-vulgaris Tul. & C. Tul. (1847) = Sporisorium sorghi, Ustilaginaceae
- T. sphagni Navashin (1890) = Bryophytomyces sphagni, Ascomycota
- T. striiformis (Westend.) Magnus (1870) = Ustilago striiformis, Ustilaginaceae
- T. thlaspeos Beck (1886) = Thecaphora thlaspeos, Glomosporiaceae
- T. tritici (Bjerk.) G. Winter (1874) = Ustilago tritici, Ustilaginaceae
- T. verruculosa (Wakef.) M. Piepenbr. (2004) = Conidiosporomyces verruculosus

== See also ==
- Common bunt
- Iraqi biological weapons program
