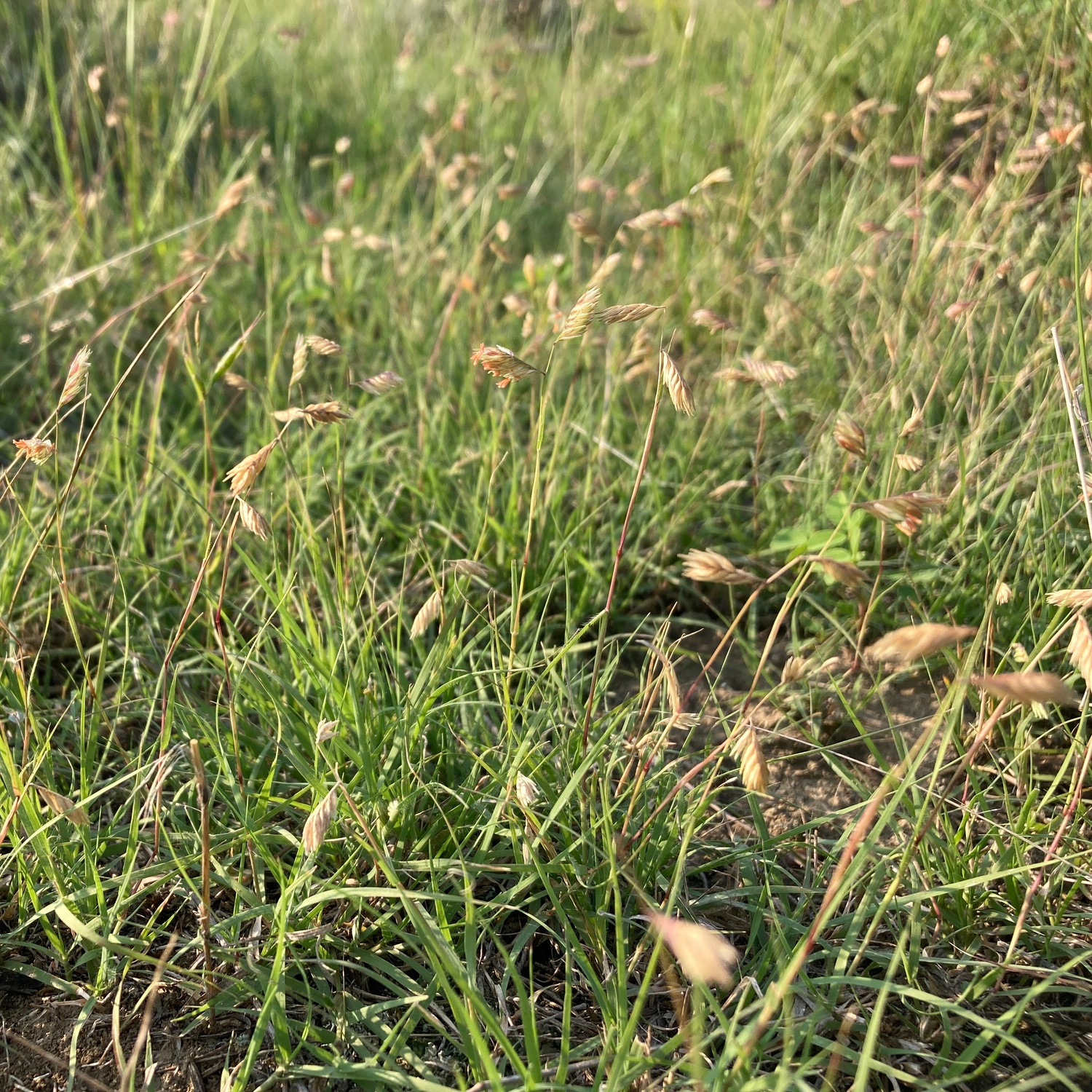
- Bouteloua dactyloides with pollen flowers Carter County, Montana

Conservation status
- Apparently Secure (NatureServe)

Scientific classification
- Kingdom: Plantae
- Clade: Tracheophytes
- Clade: Angiosperms
- Clade: Monocots
- Clade: Commelinids
- Order: Poales
- Family: Poaceae
- Subfamily: Chloridoideae
- Genus: Bouteloua
- Species: B. dactyloides

Binomial name
- Bouteloua dactyloides (Nutt.) Columbus

Synonyms
- List: Anthephora axilliflora; Buchloe dactyloides; Bouteloua mutica; Bulbilis dactyloides; Calanthera dactyloides; Casiostega hookeri; Casiostega humilis; Casiostega dactyloides; Melica mexicana; Sesleria dactyloides

= Bouteloua dactyloides =

Western North American species of grass

Bouteloua dactyloides, commonly known as buffalograss or buffalo grass, is a North American prairie grass native to Canada, Mexico, and the United States. It is a short grass found mainly on the High Plains and is co-dominant with blue grama (B. gracilis) over most of the shortgrass prairie. Buffalo grass in North America is not the same species of grass commonly known as buffalo in Australia.

Buffalograss is valued both as a forage species to feed domesticated animals and as a landscaping plant used in low water lawns and xeriscaping. Because its plants tend to have a single sex, many cultivars without pollen have been produced for use in lawns. It recovers quickly from grazing and from drought due to its ability to vegetatively reproduce itself by means of runners.

== Description ==
Bouteloua dactyloides is a perennial plant that spreads by stolons (runners). A plant may extend stolons outward to reach a length of 15 to 45 centimetres (6 to 18 in) by the end of a growing season. In ideal experimental conditions stolons may grow as much as 5.71 centimetres (2.25 in) per day. When blooming or going to seed it has short, upright stalks (culms) that may be anywhere from 1–30 centimetres tall.

Buffalograss is a sod forming species usually forming a solid and tight mat of plants. Roots are also numerous and thoroughly occupy the soil. The roots of buffalograss are significantly finer than those of most plains grasses, with a thickness of less than 1 mm (0.039 in). Despite their narrow diameter they are quite tough and wire-like. Though the roots may reach depths of 1.2 to 1.8 metres (4 to 6 ft) 70% of their mass is in the top 15 centimetres (6 in) of the soil and 81% in the top 30 centimetres (12 in). The main roots grow almost directly downward with only very short side roots and very little or no branching. Plants also produce surface roots that growing horizontally to a distance of 24 to 36 centimetres (9 to 14 in) from the plant.

The leaf blades of buffalograss are quite narrow, soft, somewhat curly, hairy on both sides, and usually gray-green in color. Each is 2–15 centimetres (1–6 in) long while being just 1.0–2.5 millimetres wide.

Buffalograss usually produces pollen or seeds on separate plants and because it reproduces by stolons large patches of just one sex may form. The seed producing flower stalks are much shorter than the pollen producing flower stalks, with the seed heads usually at the same level as the grass blades. The seed producing inflorescences are very modified compared with other grasses including the other grasses in the Bouteloua genus, looking like a round globe topped with short spikes, appropriately called a spikelet, with three to seven spikelets per bur. When ripe the seeds are contained within a hard, round diaspore of between 3–4 millimetres in size.

Unlike Kentucky blue grass, buffalograss is a warm-season grass, a group of grasses that grows better at temperatures above 15 °C (59 °F). As a warm season grass it becomes green late in the spring and dries out early in the fall. The dried leaves and inflorescence stalks persist through the dormant period, turning a light golden color.

The haploid chromosome number for buffalograss is 10 and the species may be diploid (2n=20), tetraploid (4n=40), or hexaploid (6n=60). The diploid and tetraploid plants are more often found in the southern parts of its range while hexaploids are more often found in the north.

== Taxonomy ==
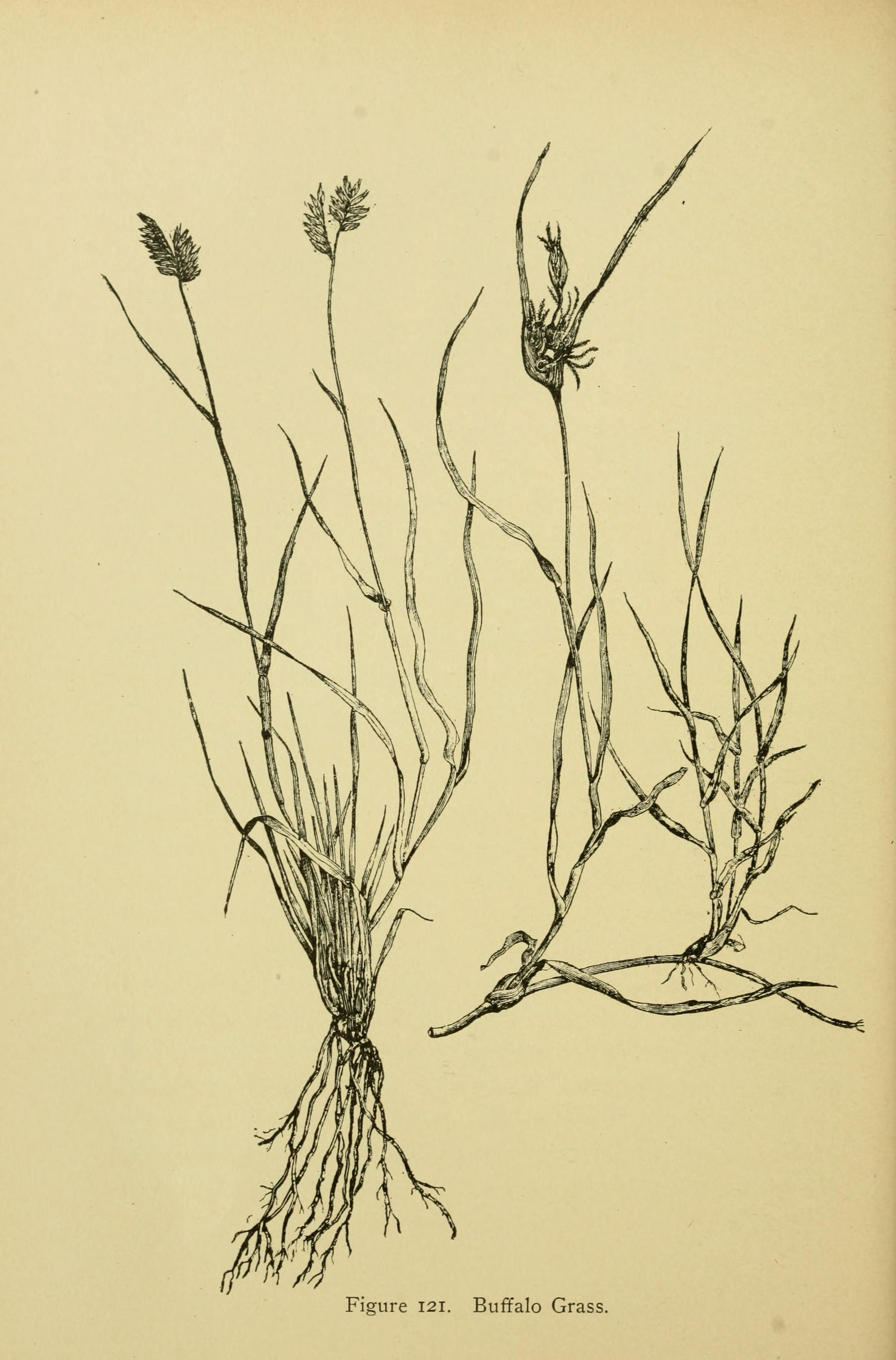
Illustration of buffalo grass

Bouteloua dactyloides was first scientifically described by the early American botanist Thomas Nuttall in 1818 with the binomial name Sesleria dactyloides. Nuttall described it as growing, " On the open grassy plains of the Missouri;". His placement of the species in genus Sesleria was almost immediately disputed with Constantine Samuel Rafinesque publishing a description the next year placing it in a new genus, Bulbilis. Also significant in the taxonomic history of the species is the 1859 description by George Engelmann of it as Buchloë dactyloides the sole species in the new genus Buchloë. This genus name was a shortened form of Bubalochloe, a Latinized form of the common name buffalo grass. Until the end of the 20th-century this was the most widely used name for the species. In 1999 James Travis Columbus published a paper recommending that Buchloe and several other small genera be combined with Bouteloua placing buffalograss with the grama grasses. As of 2024 this is the most widely used classification of this species including in Plants of the World Online (POWO), World Flora Online, and the USDA Natural Resources Conservation Service PLANTS database.

Fossil evidence from Kansas indicates that the species evolved more than seven million years ago.

=== Synonyms ===
Buffalograss has 10 botanical synonyms.

Table of Synonyms
Name	Year	Notes
Anthephora axilliflora Steud.	1854	= het.
Bouteloua mutica Griseb. ex E.Fourn.	1886	= het., pro syn.
Buchloe dactyloides (Nutt.) Engelm.	1859	≡ hom.
Bulbilis dactyloides (Nutt.) Raf.	1819	≡ hom.
Calanthera dactyloides (Nutt.) Kunth	1856	≡ hom.
Casiostega dactyloides (Nutt.) E.Fourn.	1876	≡ hom.
Casiostega hookeri Rupr. ex E.Fourn.	1876	= het., pro syn.
Casiostega humilis Rupr. ex Munro	1857	= het.
Melica mexicana Link ex E.Fourn.	1886	= het., pro syn.
Sesleria dactyloides Nutt.	1818	≡ hom.
Notes: ≡ homotypic synonym; = heterotypic synonym

=== Names ===
The genus name comes from the family name of the 19th-century Spanish botanists Claudio and Esteban Boutelou. The species name, dactyloides, is from Latin meaning resembling fingers.

It is known both as buffalograss and buffalo grass, though buffalo grass is also used as a common name for St. Augustine grass in Australia, as an alternate name of Cenchrus ciliaris and Panicum stapfianum in South Africa, and one of the names of Paspalum conjugatum in Singapore. It is also occasionally called "gama grass".

== Range and habitat ==
Buffalograss is native to the shortgrass of North America from Canada to Mexico. In Canada it is found in the provinces of Manitoba and Saskatchewan. In the United States it is primarily found in the great plains mostly west of the Mississippi from Minnesota and Montana in the north to New Mexico and Louisiana in the south. East of the Mississippi it is also found in Illinois, and in one county in Virginia and Georgia. Though it is found in Wisconsin, POWO lists it as an introduced species in that state. Similarly, NatureServe lists it as an introduced species in Virginia. Though the World Plants database lists it as native there. West of the Rocky Mountains it is also found in Arizona and in one county in both Utah and Nevada. It is found through much of Northern Mexico from Sonora in the west to Tamaulipas in the east and south to Morelos and Veracruz, though the species is not found on the west coast south of Sonora.

In the "Old-world" the grass has become established in Spain, Greece, and South central to South eastern China. It is also listed as growing outside cultivation in New Zealand.

Along with blue grama it is the co-dominant species in most of the shortgrass prairie ecosystem in the western Great Plains. Buffalograss is also an important component of the mixed grass prairie in drier areas and where impervious clay soils on slopes prevent the establishment of taller grasses. It also rapidly colonizes disturbed areas due to its vegetative reproduction. In the High Plains it grows best in fine textured soils and grows sparsely on sandy soils and may be overwhelmed by shifting sands. It is a component of the Western Gulf coastal grasslands in Texas, Louisiana, and Tamaulipas. Off the plains buffalograss is associated with eastern ponderosa pine forests as an understory plant, in the Cross Timbers ecoregion, and with mesquite and oak savannas. In some locations, most often at higher elevations, in the semidesert grasslands of New Mexico and northern Mexico, buffalograss is also an important species with other grama grass species. At the extreme limits of its habitat it survives low temperatures of −34.5 °C (−30 °F) or high temperatures of 49 °C (120 °F). Its elevation range is large, from near sea level to as high as 1,925 metres (6,300 ft) in Wyoming.

=== Conservation ===
NatureServe evaluated buffalograss in 2015 with a conservation status of apparently secure (G4). At the same time they found it to be secure (S5) in Kansas and apparently secure (S4) in Montana and Wyoming, but did not evaluate most of its range at the state or provincial level. The province of Manitoba considers it to be an at risk species as it is very rare there and in neighboring Saskatchewan. NatureServe gave it a rating of critically imperiled (S1) in Manitoba and in Saskatchewan, Arizona, Iowa, and Utah. They consider it to be imperiled (S2) in Illinois and vulnerable (S3) in Minnesota. They list it as possibly extirpated in Missouri. Though its range in the short-grass prairie covers more than 777,000 km^{2} half of this area has been degraded or converted to other uses. Many of the surviving areas of natural buffalograss habitat are highly fragmented. The largest areas of uninterrupted areas of native prairie are in the Central Shortgrass Prairie, in eastern Colorado and western Kansas with as much as 50% of it still in place, though used for grazing of cattle instead of the mix of native grazers.

== Ecology ==
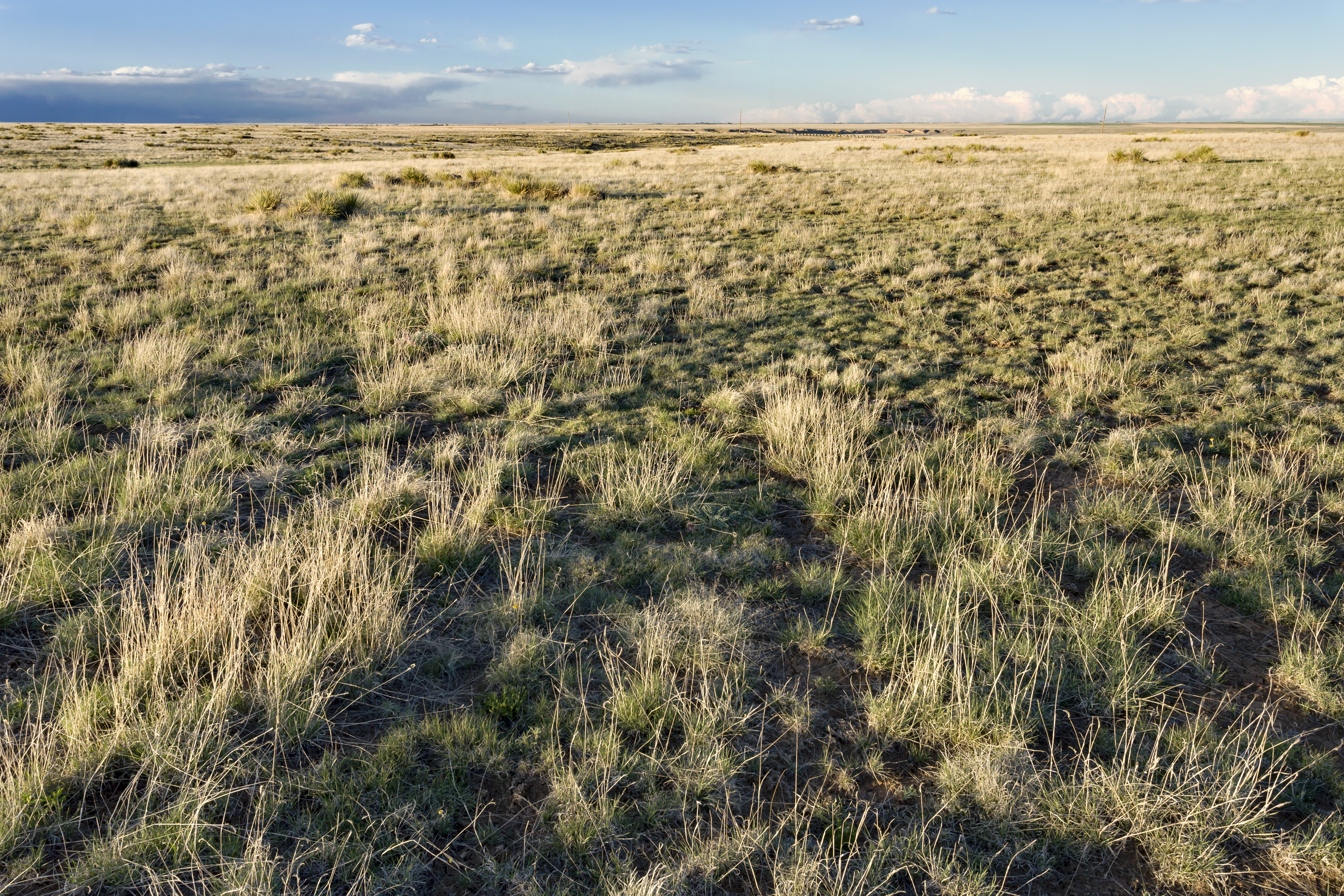
Buffalograss interspersed with blue grama grass and others, Union County, New Mexico

Having a single sex on a plant (dioecious plant) is a reproductive strategy to reduce inbreeding by separating the wind pollinated flowers. More plants with both sexes on one plant are found near the edges of its range where it is less dominant and where it forms a more continuous sod there tend to be more single sex populations, with more pollen producing plants with increased resources such as light or nitrogen. When rooting plants that are connected to each other avoid competition. After two months of independence from each other buffalograss plants compete for soil resources in the same way as with any other unrelated plant of the same species. Germination without damage to the seed coat is low, but continues for a long time. In addition to starting new plants, the stolon connections also communicate defense signals between connected plants about the removal of leaves by herbivores. Because of its fine and dense root network it excellent for controlling erosion.

Buffalograss is eaten by all types of livestock and it increases under heavy grazing pressure. The US Department of the Interior evaluated it as good to fair forage for elk in Utah and Colorado. Though it is not their favorite plant food, buffalograss together with blue grama grass is the most commonly consumed plant for American bison grazing in the shortgrass biome. At times the combined bulk of the two plants making up 80% of their diet.

In black-tailed prairie dog towns buffalograss tends to be the dominant plant species in the mixed grass prairie where western wheatgrass (Pascopyrum smithii) and blue grama grass predominate in nearby areas.

The seeds of buffalograss break their dormancy more readily with some damage to the outer layers of the seed. This is likely to be an adaptation to the grazing of buffalo as germination is also enhanced in experiments using cattle as substitute for buffalo. Once passed through the gut seeds showed a quicker germination than untreated counterparts. The seeds also sprout during cold stratification rather than waiting for warmer temperatures.

Two species of lepidopterans feed on buffalograss during the caterpillar stage of development. The small butterfly called the green skipper (Hesperia viridis) feeds upon this and other Bouteloua species as a caterpillar. The more specialized buffalograss webworm (Prionapteryx indentella) is only known to feed upon its namesake species. It lives on the plains from Texas to Kansas.

=== Diseases ===
Buffalograss false smut is a fungal disease caused by Porocercospora seminalis (formerly placed in the genus Cercospora). Infection by the fungus prevents normal caryopsis development, resulting in loss of yield and reduced seed germination.

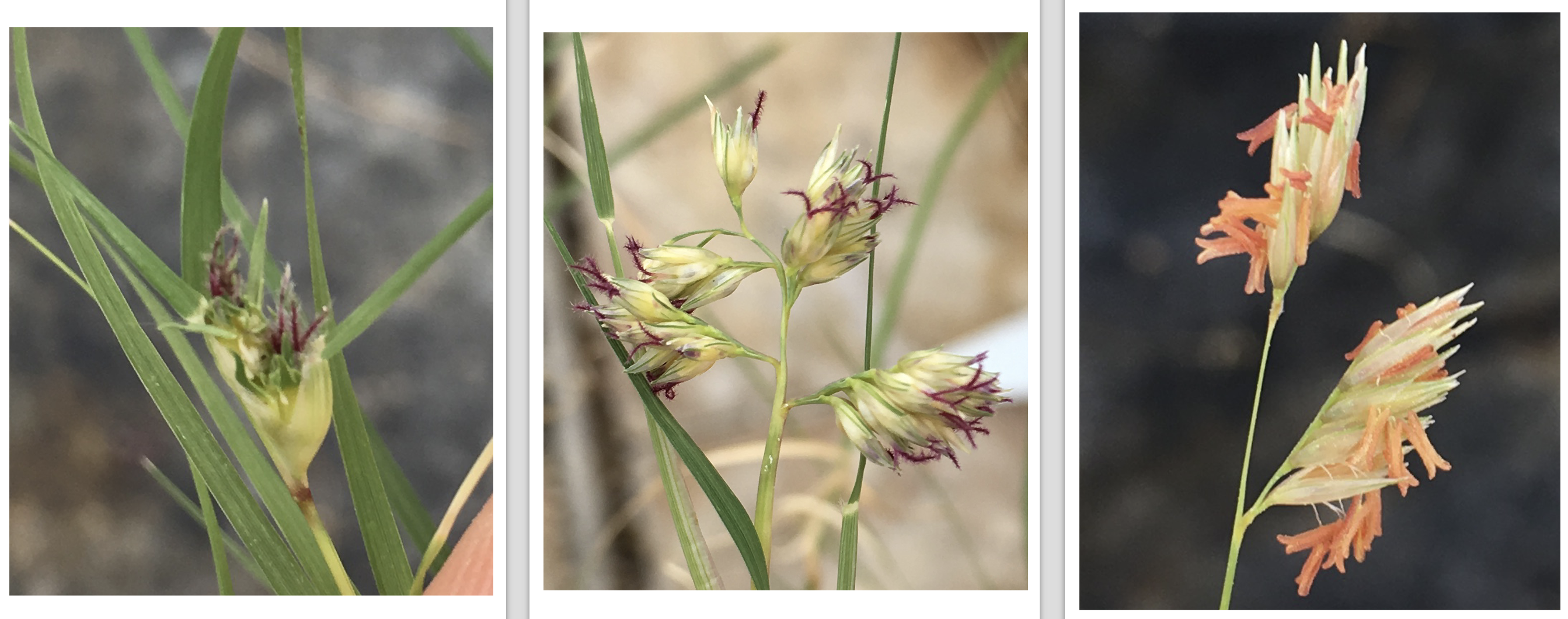
The middle panel shows male buffalograss flowers infected with S. buchloëana. Uninfected female and male flowers (left and right, respectively) illustrate the typical characteristics of buffalograss' sexes.

Buffalograss is the sole host to the sex-altering fungus, Salmacisia buchloëana (formerly a Tilletia). Infection with S. buchloëana causes male plants to develop female flowers. Salmacisia buchloëana is relatively uncommon in fields and causes minimal loss in yield.

=== Wildfire ===
Fire was an essential part of the prairie ecosystem and buffalograss has many adaptations to survive or take advantage of fires. Warm season grasses can catch fire in all seasons, including winter and early spring.

== Uses ==
=== Cultivation ===
Buffalo grass is particularly noted for thriving in clay soils and full sun. It is intolerant of salt and moisture in excess of about 750 millimetres (30 in) per year. Many cultivars have been developed or collected for different purposes. Though seed is available and less expensive than sod, it is more expensive than common lawn grass species due to the difficulty in harvesting seeds which grow very low to the ground in the grass canopy. In addition the bur that contains the seed must be removed or treated to weaken it or the germination rate will be quite low and this adds to expense of establishment using seed.

In addition to having more drought resistance than Kentucky blue grass or perennial ryegrass, buffalograss also has better wear resistance under drought conditions. Though it is more damaged by traffic in drought conditions than when not stressed. Very little research has been done on its resistance to wear under normal conditions, though preliminary research indicates it has moderate to good resistance to damage, though this is not as good as healthy blue grass.

It is of good quality for domesticated animals including cattle, horses, sheep, domesticated goats, and rabbits with a digestible protein content of between 2.7 and 2.9%.

The western chinch bug (Blissus occiduus) is a pest of buffalograss throughout its range in the western United States. To manage problems caused by them landscapers reduce the amount of dead grass (thatch) in plantings, reduce stress with proper irrigation and fertilization, and use resistant grass cultivars.

==== Forage cultivars ====
Both 'Texoka' and 'Comanche' were developed to feed livestock and can reach as much as 30 centimetres (12 in) in height.

==== Lawn cultivars ====
Turf-type buffalograss in a lawn

Only three North American grasses are both drought tolerant and suitable for use as a lawn. Of these, only buffalograss is commonly available and so it has become quite popular since the 1980s. Though the other two, blue grama and curly mesquite grass (Hilaria belangeri) are occasionally used. All female cultivars are preferred for their lower maintenance needs. Because of their lack of pollen production they may also be preferred by people who suffer from allergies. While all male types are planted when a more naturalistic look is desired or where the grass will be mowed regularly.

'Bowie': This is a later developed seeded cultivar that was released to the public in 2001. Compared to 'Cody' it has improved color and is quicker to establish.

'Cody': A seeded cultivar that was released in 1995. It is widely adapted and a reliable performer. It is also resistant to damage caused by the western chinch bug.

'Legacy': Also known as 'NE86-61', this cultivar was developed by the University of Nebraska. It is an all female selection that does not produce pollen. It was released in 1997, but only available from growers starting in 2000. Like other all female selections it must be established from sod, plugs, or cuttings. Compared to other cultivars it has good cold hardiness and can be planted in USDA zone 2.

'Prairie': This cultivar was developed by Texas and Nebraska Agricultural Experiment Stations. It was released in 1990 and has a denser foliage compared to many other selections. It is an all female cultivar and must be established from plugs or cuttings. It is not well adapted to colder conditions and can experience significant winter kill in the Front Range region of Colorado.

'Prestige': This cultivar is noted for its resistance to damage by the western chinch bug.

'Stampede': A very short cultivar that does not get taller than 10 centimetres (4 in).

'Sundancer': A seeded cultivar that was released in 2014 which has improved color and an earlier spring green up compared to older varieties.

'UC Verde': This cultivar was developed by the University of California, Riverside to have better performance in the hot summers of California. It grows 7.5–15 centimetres (3–6 in) in height and will stay partially green in the warm winters of southern California if not mowed in the fall.

'609': The '609' cultivar was also developed by Texas and Nebraska Agricultural Experiment Stations and released in 1990. Compared with other cultivars it has a deeper green color. Like some other cultivars developed for warmer climates it is sensitive to cold, dry conditions and can experience significant winter kill in Colorado.

=== Building ===
Settlers used its dense sod to build sod houses.
