= Tilletia laevis =

Scientific classification
- Kingdom: Fungi
- Division: Basidiomycota
- Class: Exobasidiomycetes
- Order: Tilletiales
- Family: Tilletiaceae
- Genus: Tilletia
- Species: T. laevis

Binomial name
- Tilletia laevis J.G. Kühn, (1873)

Synonyms
- Erysibe foetida Tilletia foetens Tilletia foetida Tilletia tritici var. laevis Ustilago foetens

Species of fungus

Tilletia laevis is a plant pathogen that causes bunt on wheat.

It was used as a biological weapon by Iraq against Iran during the Iran–Iraq War in the 1980s.
