= Tilletia barclayana =

Scientific classification
- Kingdom: Fungi
- Division: Basidiomycota
- Class: Exobasidiomycetes
- Order: Tilletiales
- Family: Tilletiaceae
- Genus: Tilletia
- Species: T. barclayana

Binomial name
- Tilletia barclayana (Bref.) Sacc. & P. Syd., (1899)

Synonyms
- Neovossia barclayana Bref., (1895); Neovossia pulcherrima (Ellis & L.D. Galloway ex G.P. Clinton) Vánky, (1990); Tilletia ajrekarii Mundk., (1939); Tilletia pulcherrima Ellis & L.D. Galloway, (1904)

Species of fungus

Tilletia barclayana is a plant pathogen that infects rice, signalgrass, pearl millet, and crabgrass. The pathogen corrupts the crops it infects, causing black busts to appear on the crops, which then become discolored and smutted.

== History ==
Tilletia barclayana can live up to 2 years or more while in a host, and is found largely worldwide. Although the origin of the pathogen is unknown, it was first reported in the 1980s.

== Impact ==
Tilletia barclayana spreads between nearby plants, leading to an increased loss. Due to this impact scientists are attempting to make these crops more resistant to the pathogen. As of now, the main method of controlling the pathogen is by pulling the infected crops directly from the ground.

== Control ==
Out of salicylic acid and plant extracts of Ammi visnaga, Glycyrrhiza glabra, Artemisia judaica, Mentha viridis, Syzygium aromaticum and Eucalyptus globulus, M. viridis and S. aromaticum were most effective in prevention of T. barclayana infection. All the tested solutions did provide some level of protection however.
