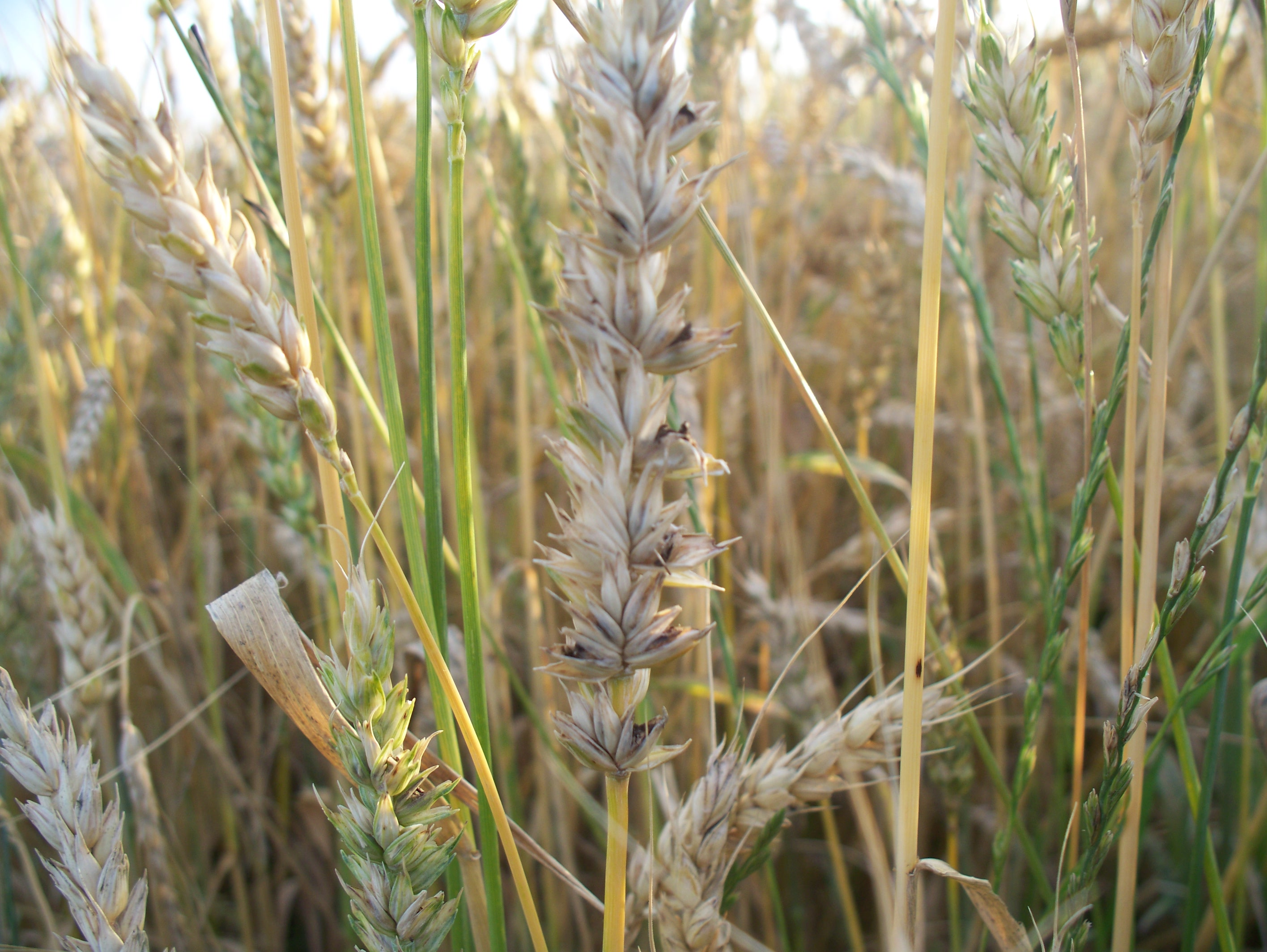

Scientific classification
- Kingdom: Fungi
- Division: Basidiomycota
- Class: Exobasidiomycetes
- Order: Tilletiales
- Family: Tilletiaceae
- Genus: Tilletia
- Species: T. caries

Binomial name
- Tilletia caries (DC.) Tul. & C. Tul., (1847)

Synonyms
- Fusisporium inosculans Berk., (1847); Lycoperdon tritici Bjerk., (1775); Tilletia tritici (Bjerk.) G. Winter, (1874); Uredo caries DC., (1815)

= Tilletia caries =

Species of fungus

Tilletia caries (synonymous with Tilletia tritici) is a basidiomycete that causes common bunt of wheat. The common names of this disease are stinking bunt of wheat and stinking smut of wheat. This pathogen infects wheat, rye, and various other grasses. T. caries is economically and agriculturally important because it reduces both the wheat yield and grain quality.

== Life cycle ==
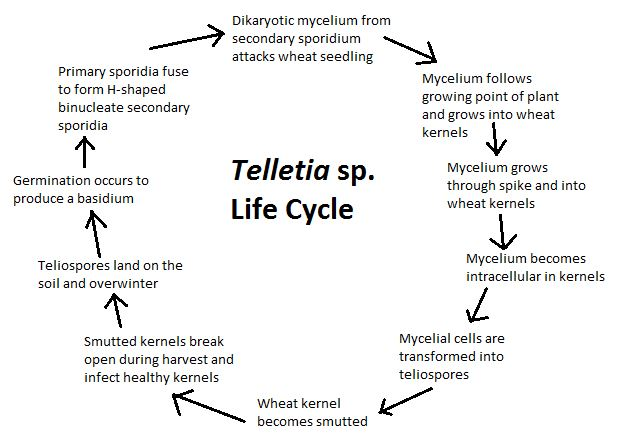
Life cycle of Tilletia spp

Infection of the wheat occurs during germination of the plant seed and is favored by cool, wet conditions. Optimum conditions for spore germination are soil temperatures in the range of 5–15 °C (41–59 °F). Bunt fungi overwinter as dikaryotic teliospores typically on seed and occasionally in soil. The fungus infects the shoots of wheat seedlings before the plants emerge from the soil. After karyogamy, the teliospores germinate to form a basidium, on which 8–16 haploid basidiospores (primary sporidia) will develop. There are two mating types of basidiospores (+ and -) and they fuse to form H-shaped structures to establish a dikaryon. This dikaryon then will yield infectious hyphae which can either produce more hyphae or more secondary sporidia. The pathogen grows within the terminal meristem via mycelium and completes its life cycle by transforming the mycelial cells into teliospores. The smutted wheat kernels that are full of teliospores break open and release upon harvest, which allows for the teliospores to overwinter on the seed and are blown away by currents onto the soil, thus completing the life cycle.

== Morphology ==
Teliopsores are thick-walled, globiose, reticulate and 13–23 μm in diameter.

== Hosts ==
Agropyron (wheatgrass), Bromus (bromegrasses), Elymus (wildrye), Festuca (fescues), Hordeum (barleys), Lolium (ryegrasses), Poa (meadow grass), Secale cereale (rye), Triticale, Triticum spp. (wheats) – including T. aestivum (common wheat), T. dicoccum (hulled wheat), T. turgidum (durum wheat) – and other Poaceae (other grasses).

== Signs and symptoms ==
It is difficult to detect Tilletia caries early in its infection period; by the time symptoms are able to be detected, the pathogen is systemic throughout the plant. Plants that are infected will be stunted anywhere from a few centimeters/inches below average to half the average height of a healthy plant. Additionally, the heads are slender and remain green longer than healthy heads. A symptom that is indicative of T. caries is the replacement of yellow heads with grey bunt balls in the head of infected plants. The infected bunt balls are about the same shape and size as normal kernels. When the mature kernels are broken, they are full of a black, powdery mass of the fungal spores. These fungal spores give off a distinctive fishy smell and are oily to the touch.

== History and significance ==
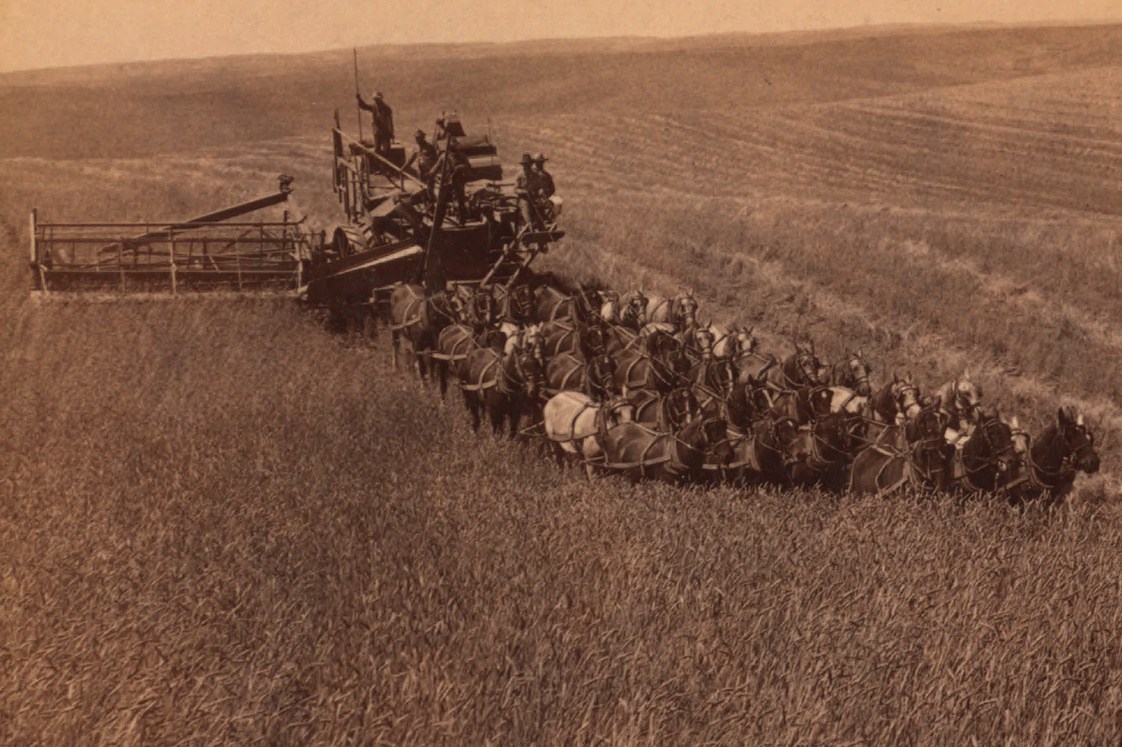
Walla Walla ca. 1902

From the late 1800s until the 1930s, stinking smut was a devastating disease of wheat. For example, infection levels over 20% were common in Washington State in the early 1900s. One of the most extreme cases was in Kansas in 1890 where the yield was reduced 20–50% because of Tilletia caries. Only when seed treatments became available after 1930 did losses from smut drop to much lower levels. Today, losses from smut rarely occur unless a grower chooses not to plant treated seed, but, if left untreated, bunt can reduce yield by more than 50%. In modern agriculture, if an infection occurs, losses are 5–10%. If there is a significant T. caries infection, the dusty and oily spore masses released during harvest can lead to combine explosions. Static electricity that develops around the combine machinery ignites the teliospore dust released from the combine.

=== Use as a biological weapon ===
It was used as a biological weapon by Iraq against Iran during the Iran–Iraq War in the 1980s.

== Management ==
The most effective and widely used management strategy for common bunt is to treat seed with fungicide before planting. According to the University of Nebraska–Lincoln Institute of Agriculture and Natural Resources, it is recommended to buy certified, fungicide-treated seed or have it cleaned and treated by a commercial seed conditioner. There are ways that farmers can manipulate the severity of the infection to a certain extent. For example, they can plant the seed when the soil temperature is higher than what is ideal for teliospore germination, e.g., above 68 °F (20 °C). For winter wheat this means planting in early fall and for spring wheat planting in late spring. This tactic can reduce the amount of smut that occurs, but it typically does not eliminate the disease. Typically, smut poses more of a problem in winter wheat than in spring wheat because in autumn, when winter wheat is planted, there is a longer period of more favorable temperatures for teliospore germination than compared to the planting season for spring wheat. There are no current wheat cultivars on the market with good resistance to common bunt. However, there have been research efforts that utilize DNA markers for resistant cultivars in the attempt to understand the specific genes that code for resistance against common bunt. This may be applied for future breeding of commercially available resistant wheat crop.

== See also ==
- Common bunt
