= Wash versus trim =

Guidelines from the USDA

The US Department of Agriculture (USDA) requires that any time fecal contamination is detected during meat and poultry processing, it must be removed from the carcass. Wash versus trim is shorthand used to characterize the debate over how this rule has been applied and enforced by USDA in meat and poultry plants.

For a number of years, poultry processors have been permitted to either rinse (wash) off or cut (trim) away such contamination, but beef processors have only been permitted to (trim) it with a knife. This, they argue, costs them money in lost product weight and imposes a requirement that poultry producers do not have to meet. The policy jargon for this debate is "wash versus trim". USDA, early in 1997, clarified its zero tolerance rule for poultry; a year earlier it gave beef plants permission to use a new high-temperature vacuuming method to remove fecal contamination in lieu of cutting it off.

== See also ==
- Zero tolerance (food policy)
