= Carl Christoph Oelhafen von Schoellenbach =

German lawyer and forester

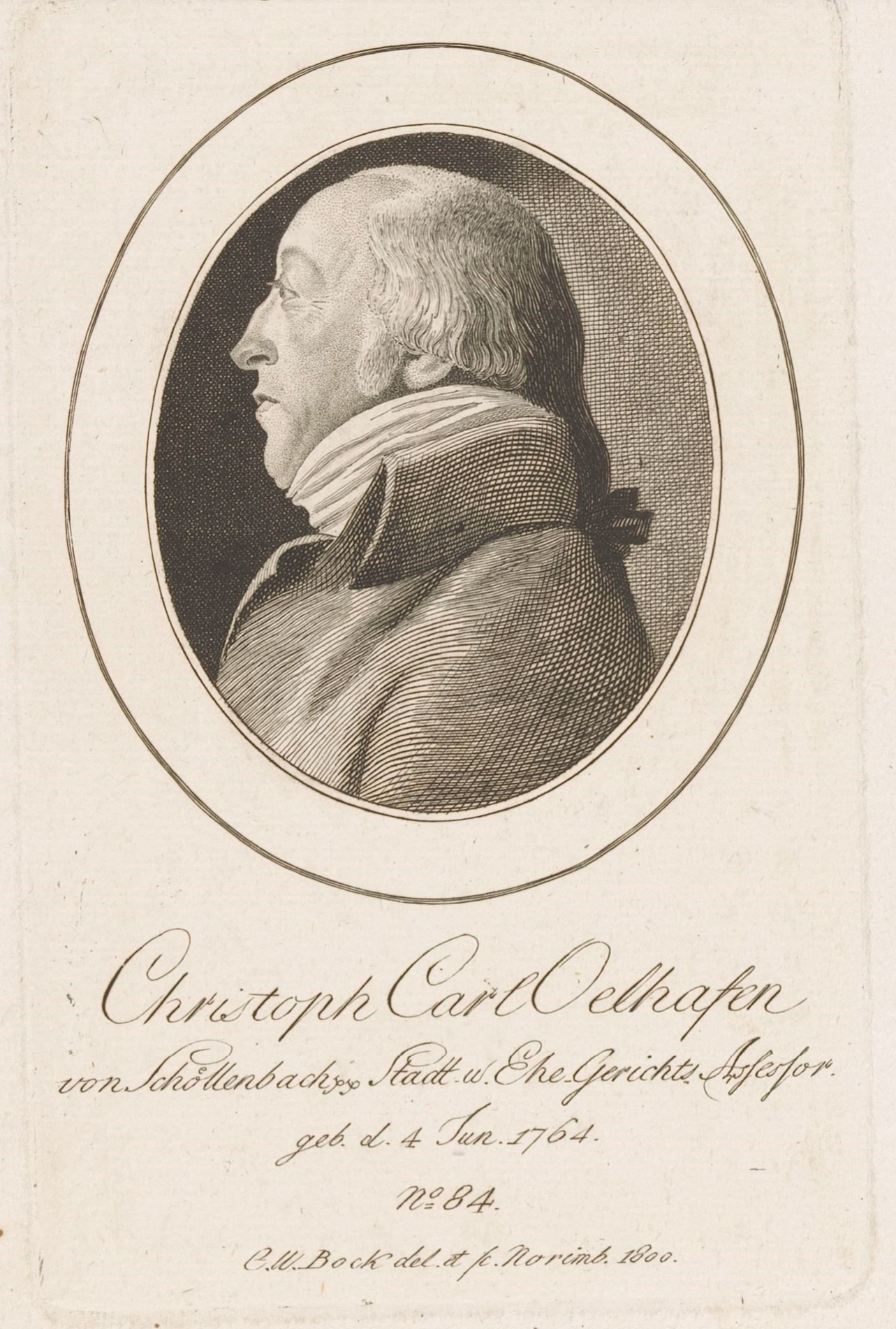

Carl Christoph Oelhafen von Schöllenbach or Ölhafen von Schellenbach (16 February 1709 – 20 June 1785) was a German lawyer and forester who worked in Franconia. He wrote on a number of forestry related topics.

Oelhafen was born in the manor of Eismannsberg near Altdorf belonging to the noble family of Oelhafen von Schöllenbach, his father Christoph Elias (1675–1736) was a lawyer married to Anna Maria née Gwandschneider. His younger siblings included the future Field Marshal of the Franconian Imperial Circle Georg Christoph Oelhafen von Schöllenbach (1710–1779) and the Court Councillor Jakob Christoph Oelhafen von Schöllenbach (1712–1749). Carl Christoph studied at Altdorf between 1724 and 1732 and then travelled across Europe as part of the academic grand tour. After returning he became an administrator in Velden and Hausseck in 1737. In 1748 he moved to Gräfenberg and in 1764 he became bailiff and judge at Sebaldiwald near Nuremberg. He took an interest in fruit and timber trees and was involved in establishing plantations and forestry across Franconia. He translated the works of Henry Louis Du Hamel du Monceau including De la Physique des Arbres (1758) into German and also wrote on the wild trees of Franconia. He also translated René-Antoine Ferchault de Réaumur's work on the bees. He was admitted to the Leopoldina Academy in 1771 with the name Benedictus Curtius.
