= Salmacisia =

Scientific classification
- Kingdom: Fungi
- Division: Basidiomycota
- Class: Exobasidiomycetes
- Order: Tilletiales
- Family: Tilletiaceae
- Genus: Salmacisia; D.R.Huff & A.Chandra (2008)

Type species
- Salmacisia buchloëana (Kellerm. & Swingle) D.R.Huff & A.Chandra (2008)

Synonyms
- Tilletia buchloëana Kellerm. & Swingle (1889)

Genus of fungi

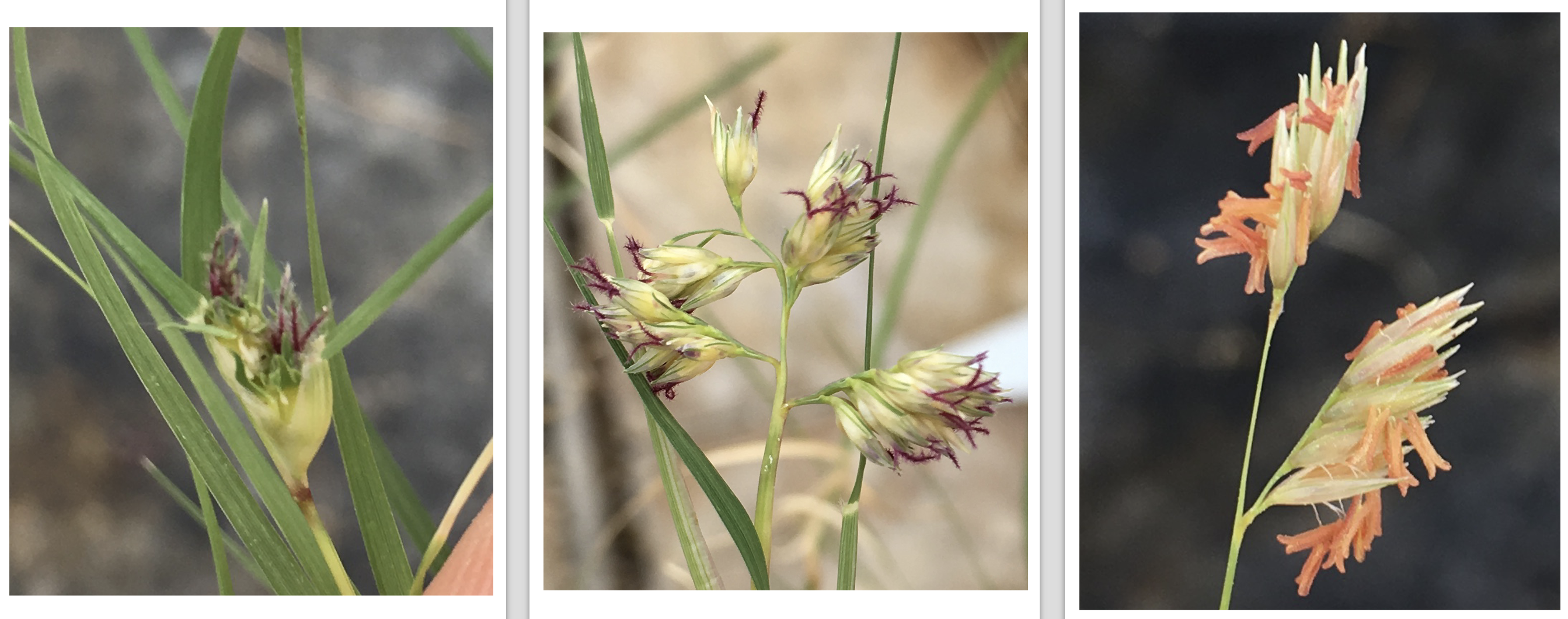
The middle panel shows male buffalograss flowers infected with S. buchloëana. Uninfected female flowers (left) and male flowers (right) show the typical morphology of buffalograss' sexes.

Salmacisia is a fungal genus in the family Tilletiaceae. It is a monotypic genus, containing the single species Salmacisia buchloëana, first described as Tilletia buchloëana in 1889, and renamed in 2008. Plants infected by the fungus undergo a phenomenon known as "parasitically induced hermaphroditism", whereby ovary development is induced in otherwise male plants. Because of the pistil-inducing effects of the fungus, the authors have named the species pistil smut; it is the only species in the order Tilletiales known to have hermaphroditic effects.

== Taxonomy and history ==
In 1889, American mycologist William Ashbrook Kellerman and his student Walter T. Swingle discovered a species of smut that was able to change the sex of its host; the host plant, in this case, buffalograss (Buchloë dactyloides), produced ovaries in flowers of plants that were otherwise male. They named the fungus Tilletia buchloëana, a generic placement they considered apt because of the characteristics of the fungal teliospores. Both Kellerman and Swingle, and later Norton in 1896, were unable to induce teliospores to germinate in vitro. Reinvestigation of the species in 2005 highlighted both the uniqueness of the species and the need for a taxonomic rearrangement, resulting in the description of the new genus Salmacisia. The genus name is derived from Salmacis, who, according to Greek mythology, transformed the boy Hermaphroditus into an individual with both male and female sexual characteristics.

== Description ==
Salmacisia species are defined as those with fruiting structures (technically known as sori) that originate only in the ovaries of infected plants, where clumps of dirty-brown agglutinated spores are formed. The spores are covered with surface ornamentations (spines or reticulations), and arise from cells of spore-creating mycelia, frequently encased in a translucent jelly-like sheath. The spores germinate by means of continuous promycelium (the germ tube of the spore) that bear primary basidiospores that can have either one nucleus, which conjugate, or two nuclei, giving rise to secondary basidiospores.

The morphological characteristics of Salmacisia are indistinguishable from species of Tilletia, they may be distinguished from this genus and other genera of the Tilletiaceae family by differences in their ribosomal DNA sequences.

== Effect on host ==
The sex organs in the induced hermaphroditic flowers become sterile as a result of infection, a process known as "parasitic castration". Ovaries become sterile because they become replaced with teliospores and form "smut balls", making the ovary unable to set seed. The anthers, however, do not show outward signs of teliospore production, but are still effectively sterile because they tend to be small and immature. Consequently, both male and female reproductive organs within induced hermaphroditic flowers of buffalograss become parasitically castrated, but for different reasons. Infection does not kill the host plants (under greenhouse conditions), rather, the plant and fungus coexist, and infected plants sometimes begin to lose symptoms of infection after three years.
