= Neovossia =

Scientific classification
- Kingdom: Fungi
- Division: Basidiomycota
- Class: Exobasidiomycetes
- Order: Tilletiales
- Family: Tilletiaceae
- Genus: Neovossia; Körn.

Type species
- Neovossia moliniae (Thüm.) Körn.

Genus of fungi

Neovossia is a genus of fungi in the family Tilletiaceae. The genus was first described by German botanist Friedrich August Körnicke in 1879.
