= Common bunt =

Fungal disease of wheat

Common bunt, also known as hill bunt, Indian bunt, European bunt, stinking smut or covered smut, is a disease of both spring and winter wheats. It is caused by two very closely related fungi, Tilletia tritici (syn. Tilletia caries) and T. laevis (syn. T. foetida).

== Symptoms ==
Plants with common bunt may be moderately stunted but infected plants cannot be easily recognized until near maturity and even then it is seldom conspicuous. After initial infection, the entire kernel is converted into a sorus consisting of a dark brown to black mass of teliospores covered by a modified periderm, which is thin and papery. The sorus is light to dark brown and is called a bunt ball. The bunt balls resemble wheat kernels but tend to be more spherical. The bunted heads are slender, bluish-green and may stay greener longer than healthy heads. The bunt balls change to a dull gray-brown at maturity, at which they become conspicuous. The fragile covering of the bunt balls are ruptured at harvest, producing clouds of spores. The spores have a fishy odor. Intact sori can also be found among harvested grain.

== Disease cycle ==
Millions of spores are released at harvest and contaminate healthy kernels or land on other plant parts or the soil. The spores persist on the contaminated kernels or in the soil. The disease is initiated when soil-borne, or in particular seed-borne, teliospores germinate in response to moisture and produce hyphae that infect germinating seeds by penetrating the coleoptile before plants emerge. Cool soil temperatures (5 to 10 °C) favor infection. The intercellular hyphae become established in the apical meristem and are maintained systemically within the plant. After initial infection, hyphae are sparse in plants. The fungus proliferates in the spikes when ovaries begin to form. Sporulation occurs in endosperm tissue until the entire kernel is converted into a sorus consisting of a dark brown to black mass of teliospores covered by a modified periderm, which is thin and papery.

== Pathotypes ==
Well-defined pathogenic races have been found among the bunt population, and the classic gene-for-gene relationship is present between the fungus and host.

== Management ==
Control of common bunt includes using clean seed, seed treatments chemicals and resistant cultivars. Historically, seed treatment with organomercury fungicides reduced common bunt to manageable levels. Systemic seed treatment fungicides include carboxin, difenoconazole, triadimenol and others and are highly effective. However, in Australia and Greece, strains of T. laevis have developed resistance to polychlorobenzene fungicides.

== See also ==
- Smut (fungus)
