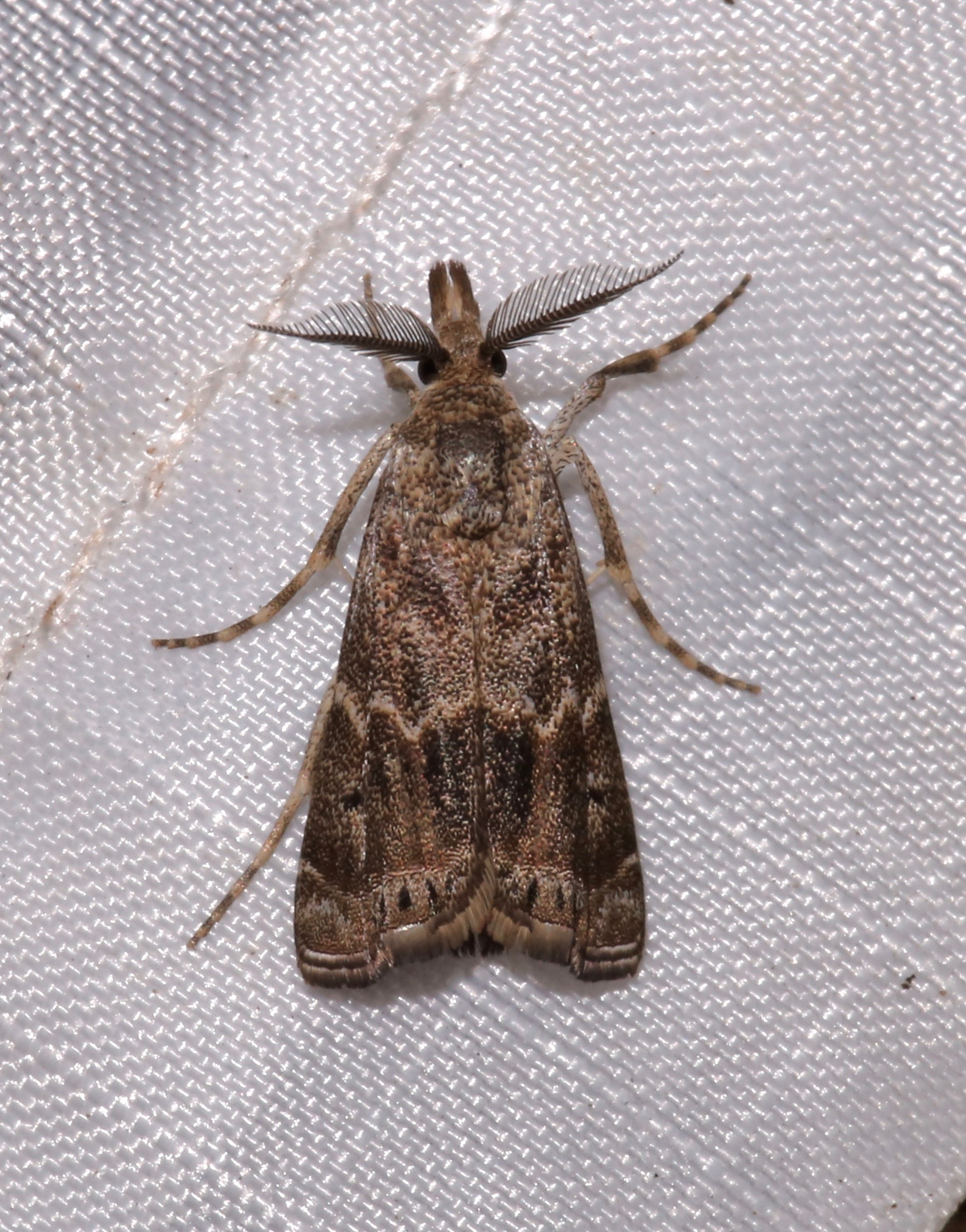

Scientific classification
- Kingdom: Animalia
- Phylum: Arthropoda
- Clade: Pancrustacea
- Class: Insecta
- Order: Lepidoptera
- Family: Crambidae
- Subfamily: Crambinae
- Tribe: Ancylolomiini
- Genus: Prionapteryx
- Species: P. indentella

Binomial name
- Prionapteryx indentella (Kearfott, 1908)

Synonyms
- Surattha indentella Kearfott, 1908

= Prionapteryx indentella =

Species of moth

Prionapteryx indentella, the buffalograss webworm, is a moth in the family Crambidae. It was described by William D. Kearfott in 1908. It is found in the US from Kansas to Texas on the Great Plains.

Adults are smoky ocherous brown. Females are larger and lighter in color. Adults are on wing from August to September in one generation per year.

The larvae feed on Bouteloua dactyloides.
