= Conidiosporomyces =

Scientific classification
- Kingdom: Fungi
- Division: Basidiomycota
- Class: Exobasidiomycetes
- Order: Tilletiales
- Family: Tilletiaceae
- Genus: Conidiosporomyces; Vánky

Type species
- Conidiosporomyces ayresii (Berk.) Vánky & R. Bauer

Species
- Conidiosporomyces ayresii Conidiosporomyces echinospermus Conidiosporomyces verruculosus

Genus of fungi

Conidiosporomyces is a genus of fungi in the smut family Tilletiaceae. The genus was described in 1992 to accommodate the species formerly known as Tilletia ayresii, first described by British naturalist Miles Joseph Berkeley in 1899. The species C. verruculosus (formerly Ustilago verruculosa) was described in 1993. Species in the genus are plant pathogens that affect various grasses.

== Description ==
The fruiting structures (technically called sori) of Conidiosporomyces species grow in the ovaries of various grass species. They are swollen masses of spores with an apical opening, surrounded by a sac-like membrane comprising tissue of both host and fungal origin. The structure supports a central semi-powdery mass made of spores, sterile cells, and balls of conidia. The fruiting structure lacks a sterile central axis known as a columella.

The spores are thick-walled, spherical or broadly elliptical, buff colored, with surface ornamentations, and dimensions of 13–16 or 12–13 by 16 μm. They germinate by means of a basidia that bears an apical cluster of elongate basidiospores. The sterile (non spore-producing) cells are pale, nearly colorless, ornamented, and frequently collapsed. The conidia are thin-walled, mostly Y-shaped, translucent, and arranged in roughly like a loose ball. When the conidia germinate, they make hyphae that can form both blastic conidia and ballistospores.

== Habitat and distribution ==
The type species C. ayresii has been collected from various locales in Africa (e.g. Cameroon, Congo, Ethiopia, Ghana, Ivory Coast, Kenya, Madagascar, Malawi, Mali, Mauritius, Mozambique, Nigeria, Sierra Leone, South Africa, Sudan, Tanzania, Togo, Uganda, Zaire, Zambia, Zimbabwe), Asia (Sri Lanka), Central America (Costa Rica), and South America (Brazil, Colombia). C. ayresii grows on various species of the genera Hyparrhenia, Panicum, and Setaria, all in the family Poaceae.
