= Erratomyces =

Scientific classification
- Kingdom: Fungi
- Division: Basidiomycota
- Class: Exobasidiomycetes
- Order: Tilletiales
- Family: Tilletiaceae
- Genus: Erratomyces; M. Piepenbr. & R. Bauer

Type species
- Erratomyces patelii (Pavgi & Thirum.) M. Piepenbr. & R. Bauer

Genus of fungi

Erratomyces is a genus of fungi in the Tilletiaceae family.
