= Oberwinkleria =

Scientific classification
- Kingdom: Fungi
- Division: Basidiomycota
- Class: Exobasidiomycetes
- Order: Tilletiales
- Family: Tilletiaceae
- Genus: Oberwinkleria; Vánky & R.Bauer (1995)

Type species
- Oberwinkleria anulata Vánky & C.Vánky (1995)

Genus of fungi

Oberwinkleria is a fungal genus in the family Tilletiaceae. This is a monotypic genus, containing the single rust species Oberwinkleria anulata, found in Venezuela growing on the grass Ortachne erectifolia. The generic name honors German mycologist Franz Oberwinkler.
