= Franz Oberwinkler =

German mycologist (1939–2018)

- Born: 22 May 1939; Bad Reichenhall, Upper Bavaria
- Died: 15 March 2018 (aged 78); Tübingen
- Education: LMU Munich
- Known for: Basidiomycete mycology
- Awards: IMA de Bary medal 2010
- Scientific career
- Fields: Mycology
- Doctoral advisor: Josef Poelt
- Author abbrev. (botany): Oberw.

Franz Oberwinkler (22 May 1939 in Bad Reichenhall, Upper Bavaria – 15 March 2018 in Tübingen) was a German mycologist, specialising in the fungal morphology, ecology and phylogeny of basidiomycetes.

Oberwinkler obtained his PhD in 1965 at LMU Munich studying under Josef Poelt. From 1967 to 1974, he was a research assistant and lecturer at the Institute of Systematic Botany, LMU Munich, becoming professor in 1972. Between 1968 and 1969, Oberwinkler was Scientific Expert of the Food and Agriculture Organization at the Instituto Forestal Latino-Americano in Mérida, Venezuela.

In 1974, he was appointed as successor to Karl Mägdefrau as Chair of Systematic Botany and Mycology at the University of Tübingen and from 1974 until his retirement in 2008 he was head of the University's botanic garden, Botanischer Garten der Universität Tübingen. In 2002, he became the founding editor-in-chief of the academic journal, Mycological Progress. Between 1962 and 2010, he authored and co-authored 340 publications. Oberwinkler retired in 2008 becoming professor emeritus of the university's 'Organismic Botany Group' and he continued as editor-in-chief of the journal.

He was the recipient of several awards, including the de Bary medal of the International Mycological Association (IMA) in 2010. Several fungal taxa are named in his honour including the species Amanita oberwinklerana, Sphaerobasidioscypha oberwinkleri, Thecaphora oberwinkleri, Uromyces oberwinklerianus, and the genera Oberwinkleria and Oberwinklerozyma. He was a member of the Norwegian Academy of Science and Letters from 1995.

== See also ==
- List of mycologists
- Category:Taxa named by Franz Oberwinkler
