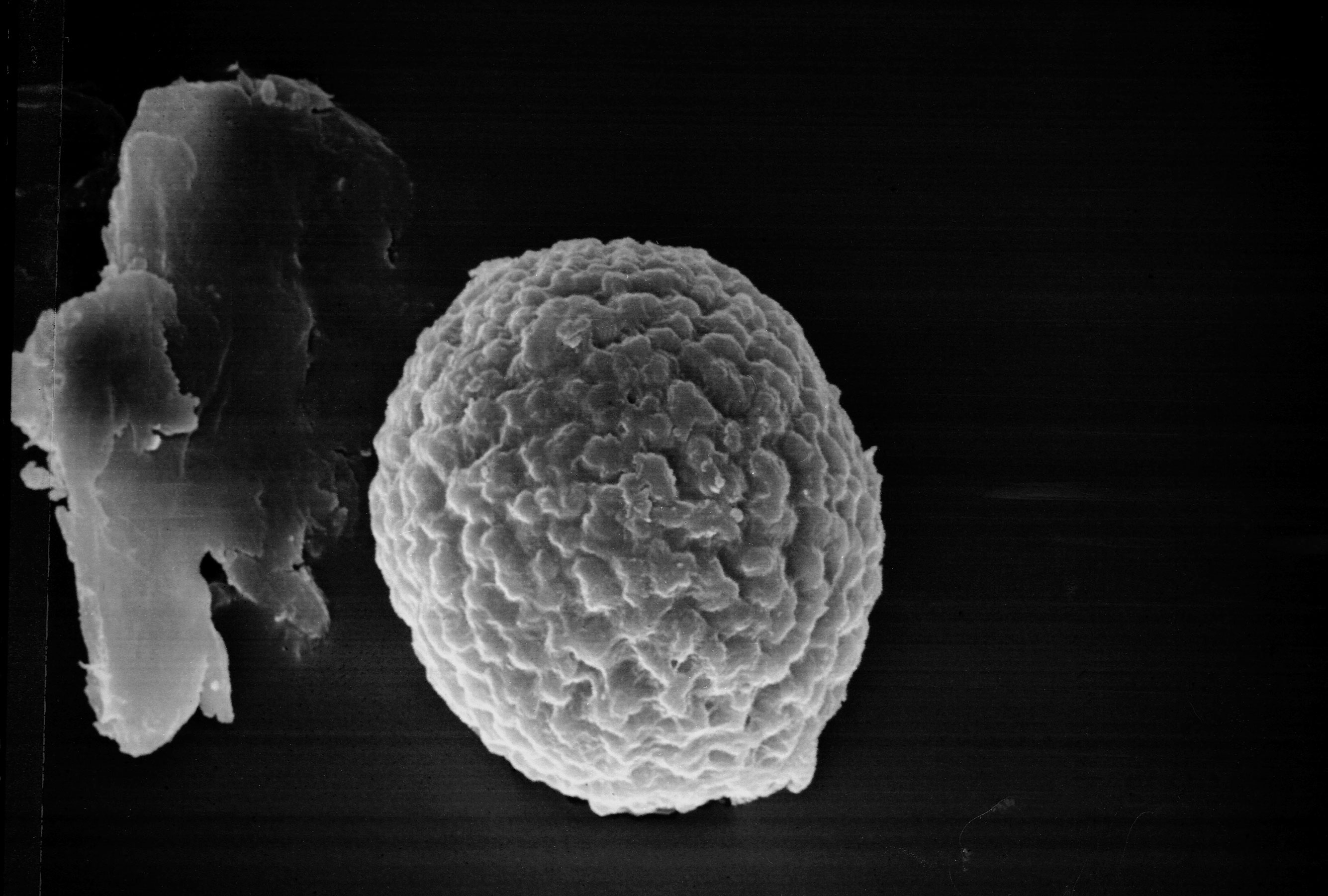

Scientific classification
- Domain: Eukaryota
- Kingdom: Fungi
- Division: Basidiomycota
- Class: Exobasidiomycetes
- Order: Tilletiales
- Family: Tilletiaceae
- Genus: Tilletia
- Species: T. indica

Binomial name
- Tilletia indica Mitra

Synonyms
- Neovossia indica (Mitra) Mundk.

= Karnal bunt =

Smut fungus damaging wheat plants

Karnal bunt (also known as partial bunt) is a fungal disease of wheat, durum wheat, and triticale. The smut fungus Tilletia indica, a basidiomycete, invades the kernels and obtains nutrients from the endosperm, leaving behind waste products with a disagreeable odor that makes bunted kernels too unpalatable for use in flour or pasta. While Karnal bunt generally does not lead to devastating crop losses, it has the potential to dramatically decrease yield, and poses additional economic concerns through quarantines which limit the export of suspected infectious wheat products from certain areas, including the U.S. Several chemical control methods exist for Karnal bunt of wheat, but much work remains to be done in identifying resistant host varieties.

== Morphology ==
=== Teliospore ===
Teliospore ultrastructure was characterized by electron microscopy by Roberson & Luttrell in 1987.

== Hosts and symptoms ==
Karnal bunt attacks durum wheat, rye, and triticale, a hybrid of wheat and rye. Despite its preference for a common crop, Karnal bunt can be extremely difficult to diagnose in the field for many reasons. First, not all kernels on a plant head will be infected, and thus infected plants are not as readily identifiable. This distribution is the reason for Karnal bunt's being referred to as partial bunt. Another factor which makes Karnal bunt difficult to readily diagnose in the field is the fact that most infected kernels do not show symptoms prior to maturity.

The disease produces dark color and a fishy smell on infected kernels. Usually only the germ end of the kernel will show symptoms, but occasionally the entire kernel may appear diseased. The darkening of the kernel is a result of the kernel tissue being converted in a teliospore mass by the fungus. Another symptom is referred to as the "canoe symptom" as in the process of replacing the healthy kernel with teliospores, the disease tends to hollow out host kernels, resulting in a canoe shape. While the dark teliospores of the fungus may be diagnostic, diagnosis of Karnal bunt poses the added difficulty of differentiating between Karnal bunt from other infections which also result in the aforementioned symptoms, such as black point, common bunt, and dwarf bunt.

== Disease cycle ==
The disease is primarily spread through contaminated seed or farm equipment, although it may also be carried short distances by the wind, especially following the burning of wheat fields. Evidence of the importance of airborne dispersal of Tilletia indica was demonstrated by Halasz et al. in 2014 when they discovered a strong correlation between teliospore concentration in the air above a wheat crop and the subsequent number of infected wheat kernels. The researchers concluded that this airborne spread of teliospores could also result in post-harvest disease development. The fungal spores can then remain viable for several years, germinating when weather conditions become favorable for development. Once the spores germinate, they infect the wheat flowers and develop large masses of spores on the embryo end of the kernels (the entire kernel is not usually affected).

In preferred weather conditions, a teliospore which has successfully attached to a susceptible host will germinate to produce what is known as a promycelium. At the apex of this structure, then, can be found 65–180 primary sporidia. Secondary sporidia can then either bud from the primary sporidia or from the fungal threads of the mycelium itself. These secondary sporidia are responsible for infecting young host plants through the ovary wall in the flowering stage. Secondary sporidia accomplish this by penetrating the epidermis of host glumes via germ tubes. Sporidia are then able to enter the maturing kernels and leave vast numbers of teliospores where healthy kernel tissue used to be. During harvest teliospores fall from the kernels to the soil from which point they may be carried elsewhere by wind or tools, thereby restarting the disease cycle.

== Environment ==
Karnal bunt is named after Karnal, India, where the disease was first discovered on a wheat crop in 1931. Since then, the disease has been reported in all major wheat-growing states of India, Pakistan, Afghanistan, Mexico, and certain areas of the Southwestern United States such as New Mexico, Arizona, and parts of Texas.

Karnal bunt pathogenesis is heavily dependent on weather conditions. Relative humidity over 70% favors teliospore development. Furthermore, daytime temperatures in the range of 18–24 °C, and soil temperatures in the range of 17–21 °C also increase the severity of Karnal bunt.

== Management ==
Control of Tilletia indica has proven challenging for many reasons. First, since teliospores do not infect kernels systematically, chemical control via seed treatments has not been a viable solution. Several other methods, such as delaying planting so as to avoid the weather conditions which favor teliospore germination, have been proven to be effective to some extent, but also pose the risk of reducing yield. Other cultural controls such as crop-rotation may be practical as the planting of non-host species for several years may reduce the number of teliospores in given field significantly.

Chemical control methods also hold promise for controlling Karnal bunt of wheat. In a 1986 study, Smilanick et al. were able to eradicate over 80% of Tilletia indica infection in wheat following two foliar applications of the fungicide propiconozole. The researchers had the same success using four foliar applications of the fungicides mancozeb or copper hydroxide. These chemical treatments were most effective when applied to host foliage 72 hours post-infection, but were not effective at all when applied to host seeds.

In 2009 researchers investigated the Muscodor albus fungus as a biocontrol agent for Karnal bunt of wheat. While biofumigation with this fungus was effective in reducing the capacity of other species of Tellitia to cause disease, this method was ineffective against the dormant teliospores of Tellitia indica. In a similar effort, researchers tested a variety of plant extracts in the hopes of finding a non-chemical control method of Karnal bunt of wheat. The researchers found extract of Acalypha indica and Lantana camara, when sprayed on wheat leaves, to reduce the number of infected plants by 65%.

As is likely the case for any plant disease, host resistance is the most practical and desired control method. Researchers analyzed the HD29 cultivar of Triticum aestivum, or common wheat, in order to explore the possibility of control via host resistance. Researchers identified three genes coding for resistance to the Ni8 isolate of the disease, and two coding for resistance to the Ni7 isolate. The two genes coding for Ni7 resistance also code for Ni8 resistance, meaning that it may be possible to identify a common gene which may confer resistance to T. indica.

== Importance ==
Karnal bunt accounts for yield losses of approximately 0.5% annually, which is negligible. Some fields of particularly susceptible wheat cultivars in India, however, have suffered losses of up to 40% in the past, but such events are rare. Significant economic losses in wheat crops occur due to quarantine and other export restrictions placed on infected areas. Furthermore, Karnal bunt of wheat poses no threat to human life in the United States as regulations deem wheat containing more than 3% bunted kernels unfit for human consumption and these crops are instead used in animal feed.

Appearance of the disease in the United States in early 1996 resulted in the Animal and Plant Health Inspection Service (APHIS) implementing an emergency quarantine, inspection, and certification program for wheat moving out of the infested areas, along with regulations on sanitizing machinery and storage facilities. Many foreign countries have a zero tolerance for karnal bunt in import shipments. As one of the world's top exporters of wheat, such restrictions negatively impact the U.S. economy.
