= Ingoldiomyces =

Scientific classification
- Kingdom: Fungi
- Division: Basidiomycota
- Class: Exobasidiomycetes
- Order: Tilletiales
- Family: Tilletiaceae
- Genus: Ingoldiomyces; Vánky
- Species: I. hyalosporus

Binomial name
- Ingoldiomyces hyalosporus (Massee) Vánky

Genus of fungi

Ingoldiomyces is a genus of fungi in the Tilletiaceae family. This is a monotypic genus, containing the single species Ingoldiomyces hyalosporus.
