= Zero tolerance (trade) =

In food safety policy, a zero tolerance standard generally means that if a potentially dangerous substance (whether microbiological, chemical, or other) is present in or on a product, that product will be considered adulterated and unfit for human consumption.

== Fecal contamination ==
In the United States meat and poultry inspection program, "zero tolerance" usually refers to the USDA rule that permits no visible signs of fecal contamination (feces) on meat and poultry carcasses. USDA requires that any time such fecal contamination is detected, it must be removed from the carcass. At issue is how this rule has been applied and enforced by USDA in meat and poultry plants. For a number of years, poultry producers have been permitted to either rinse off or cut away such contamination, but beef producers have only been permitted to trim it with a knife—which they argue costs them money in lost product weight and imposes a requirement that poultry producers do not have to meet. The policy jargon for this debate is "wash versus trim". USDA early in 1997 clarified its zero tolerance rule for poultry; a year earlier it gave beef plants permission to use a new high-temperature vacuuming method to remove fecal contamination in lieu of cutting it off.
