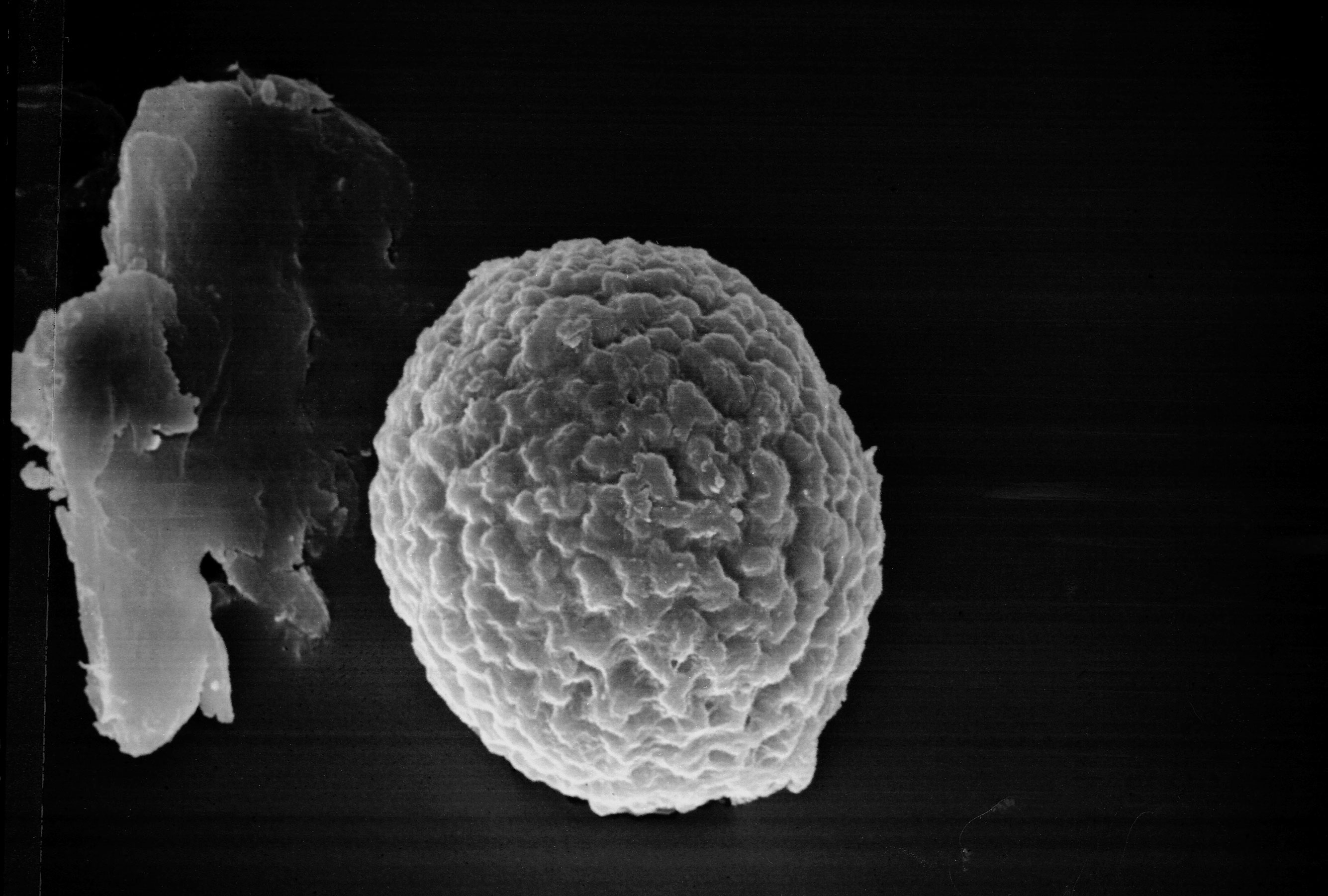
- Karnal bunt spore

Scientific classification
- Kingdom: Fungi
- Division: Basidiomycota
- Class: Exobasidiomycetes
- Subclass: Exobasidiomycetidae
- Order: Tilletiales; Kreisel ex R.Bauer & Oberw. (1997)
- Family: Tilletiaceae; J.Schröt. (1887)

Type genus
- Tilletia Tul. & C.Tul. (1847)

Genera
- Conidiosporomyces; Erratomyces; Ingoldiomyces; Neovossia; Oberwinkleria; Salmacisia; Tilletia

= Tilletiales =

Order of fungi

The Tilletiales are an order of smut fungi in the class Exobasidiomycetes. It is a monotypic order, consisting of a single family, the Tilletiaceae, which contains seven genera. The roughly 150 species in the Tilletiales all infect hosts of the grass family, except for species of Erratomyces, which occur on legumes.
