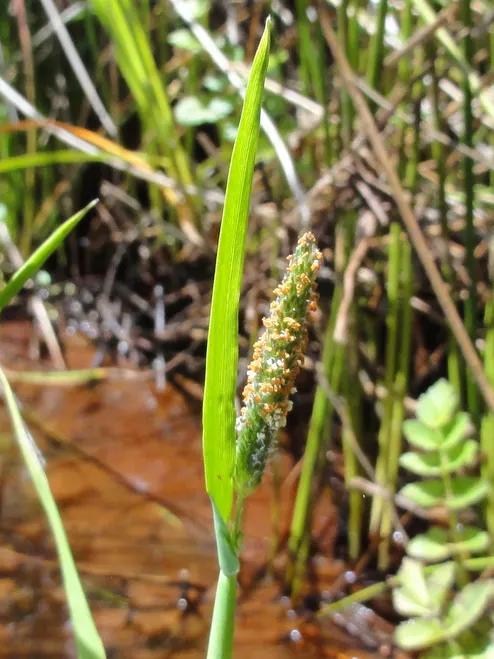
- Flowering stem of Sonoma alopecurus

Scientific classification
- Kingdom: Plantae
- Clade: Tracheophytes
- Clade: Angiosperms
- Clade: Monocots
- Clade: Commelinids
- Order: Poales
- Family: Poaceae
- Subfamily: Pooideae
- Genus: Alopecurus
- Species: A. aequalis
- Variety: A. a. var. sonomensis

Trinomial name
- Alopecurus aequalis var. sonomensis P.Rubtzoff

= Alopecurus aequalis var. sonomensis =

Variety of plant

Alopecurus aequalis var. sonomensis, commonly known as Sonoma alopecurus, is a species of grass endemic to parts of California. It is considered endangered. It is sometimes considered a taxonomic synonym of Alopecurus magellanicus.

== Description ==
Sonoma alopecurus is a perennial grass that grows up to 2.5 feet tall in wet soils and freshwater marshes. It flowers from May to July.

== Distribution ==
Though once found at sites across Sonoma and Marin Counties, it may no longer occur anywhere outside of Point Reyes. Much of its former wetland habitat has been destroyed or significantly altered for development and agriculture. Ecologists have attempted to expand its range via reintroductions without success. In Point Reyes, the main population is located in a marsh among the dunes on a parcel on the Point Reyes peninsula formerly owned by AT&T.

== Population decline and restoration efforts ==
The species was proposed to be endangered on August 2, 1995. It was listed as endangered on October 22, 1997. There is estimated to be as few as 1,000 extant plants.

The decline of Sonoma alopecurus coincided with the end of cattle grazing in the region. Evidently, periodic grazing is beneficial to the survival of the species. Ecologists suspect it helps by reducing the abundance of adjacent plant species and giving the endangered grass more space to thrive.

Initially, the Point Reyes National Seashore staff worked with ranchers to bring back prescribed grazing with the help of electric fencing around the area where the Sonoma alopecurus population occurs. The effort did not last long. Unstable soils, high winds, and cattle disturbance caused the fence to fall over, minimizing the effectiveness of grazing efforts.

As a result, Point Reyes has worked to install a barbed wire fence along the wetland. In 2020, the park applied for and received a regional NPS block grant to finish the final 2,000 feet of fence construction. Completed that November, the fence allows Sonoma alopecurus habitat to be efficiently, intensively grazed during the winter when the grass is not flowering or setting seed. The area is continually monitored by ecologists.
