= Pennsylvania Fields, Sedbury =

Protected wetland in Gloucestershire, England

- Site of Special Scientific Interest
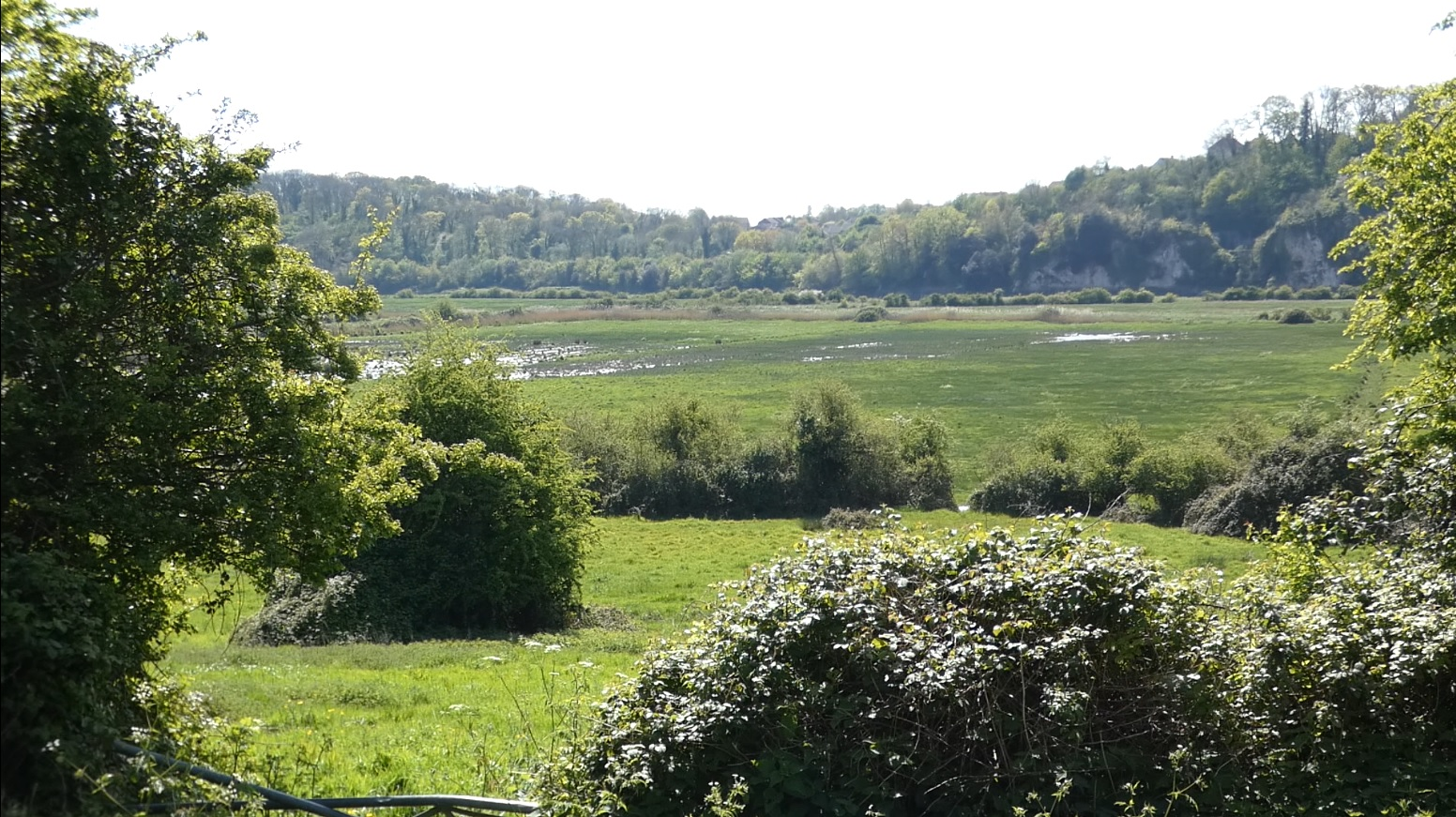
- Pennsylvania Fields in 2024, from the track to the sewage works.

- Location within Gloucestershire
- Location of Pennsylvania Fields, Sedbury.
- Area of search: Gloucestershire
- Grid reference: ST542929
- Coordinates: 51.633488°N 2.662415°W
- Interest: Biological
- Area: 27.03 ha (66.8 acres)
- Notification date: 1985

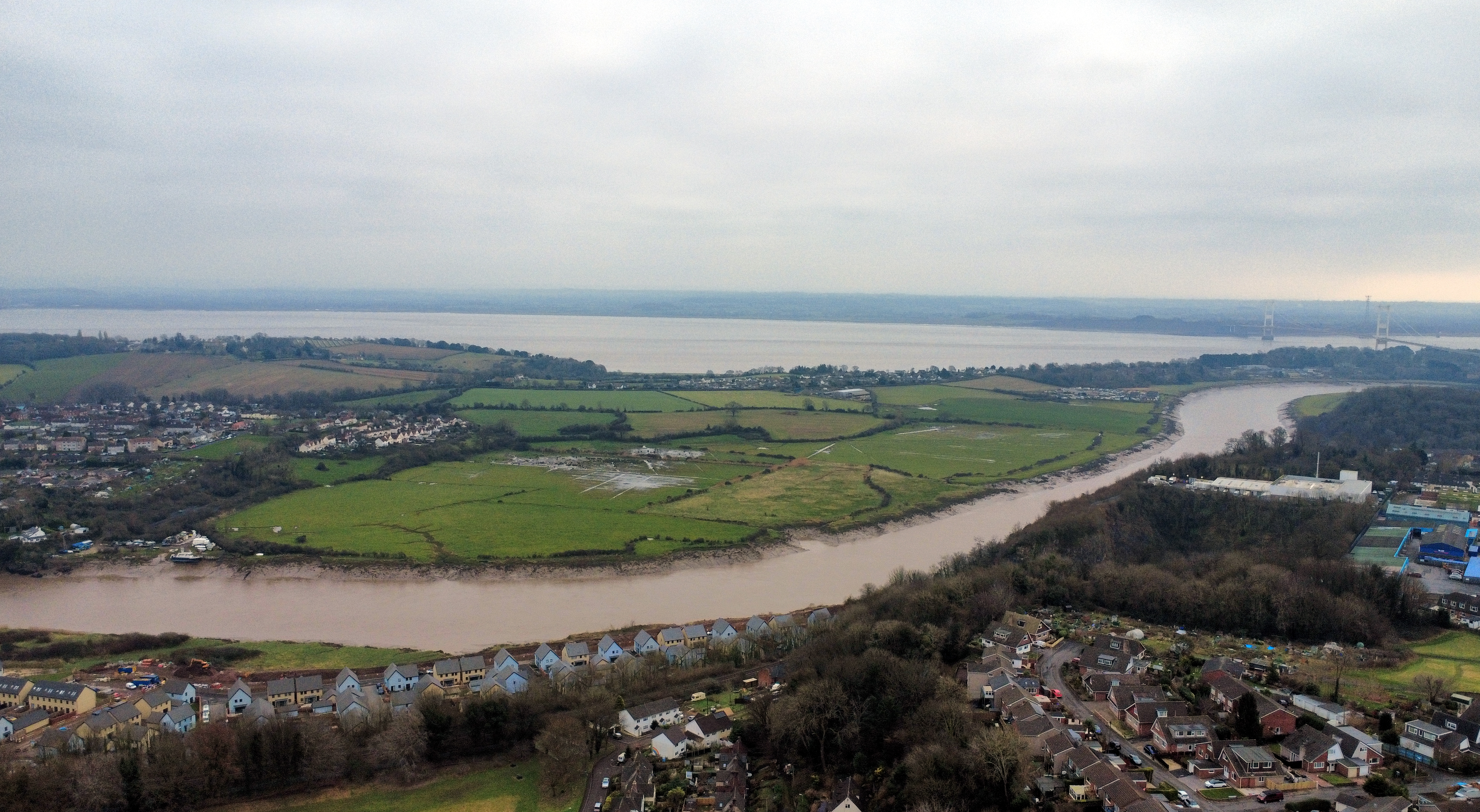
Pennsylvania Fields, looking ESE from 110m above Bulwark Park, Chepstow.

Pennsylvania Fields, Sedbury (grid reference ST542929) is a 27.03-hectare (66.8-acre) biological Site of Special Scientific Interest in Gloucestershire, notified in 1985. The environment is unique in the area, particularly for plant life. The River Wye, which passes next to it, is also an SSSI.

== Geography ==
The bedrock under the fields is of two types: Hunts Bay Oolite limestone from the east bank of the River Wye, covering about a quarter of the area, formed between 344.5 and 337 million years ago during the Carboniferous period; the remainder, continuing to the River Severn, is mudstone of the Mercia Mudstone Group formed between 252.2 and 201.3 million years ago during the Triassic period. Both types of bedrock are overlain with tidal flat deposits of clay and silt, sedimentary particles deposited between 11.8 thousand years ago and the present during the Quaternary. Elevations are from 0 or below at the intertidal Wye to 18 metres in the east but the large flat area is mostly at 8 metres.

=== Location and usage ===
The fields lie south of Sedbury, east of the River Wye and are brackish pasture which overlies alluvia soil. They lie adjacent to the lower, tidal part of the River Wye, and are unique in Gloucestershire. The area is made up of a collection of ancient ridge-and-furrow fields which are crossed by rhines and water-filled ditches. This pastureland, which is flooded by spring tides (the Wye being a tidal river), has been traditionally grazed in the summer months.

== History ==
The name comes from Pennsylvania Farm - the house still stands - where concrete huts and basic cottages were built for workers building ships at Beachley during World War I. The accommodation was inadequate, so 342 homes were planned at the farm, a project referred to as 'Pennsylvania garden city’. After the war, homes were taken over by the Ministry of Defence and later by the local council, with many sold off. Maps from the 1920s to the 1950s show the 'Pennsylvania Village' (with 'Sedbury Camp' to the north). By the late 1960s, most house-building was complete and the whole area north and south of Beachley Road was called Sedbury. The fields kept the Pennsylvania name.

== Designation ==
As well as its recognition as an SSSI the site is listed in the 'Forest of Dean Local Plan Review' as a Key Wildlife Site (KWS), noting the particular features of the site as part of the lower Wye Valley. No licensed activities (e.g. concerning foxes or badgers) can occur within the intertidal flats or saltmarsh and vehicles are prohibited from accessing these areas, only being allowed on existing tracks; the activities are prohibited between 1 March and 31 August to safeguard birds in the breeding season.

== Flora ==
Mud rush, meadow barley, red fescue, marsh foxtail and the nationally rare bulbous foxtail flourish in the pasture. There is a variety of saltmarsh plants such as sea arrowgrass, sea milkwort, sea aster, greater sea-spurrey, and lesser sea-spurrey. The rare narrow-leaved marsh dandelions (Taraxacum palustre and T. anglicum) are also recorded. Where areas become marshy grassland other species are found. The drainage ditches support a separate range of plants. The brackish water-crowfoot (Ranunculus baudotii) may be found at the boundaries of some of the fields.

== Fauna ==
Redshank and lapwing breed on the site. Mallards and Canada Geese are regular visitors, as are local Shelduck and corvids which nest along the limestone cliffs of the valley. Several species of damselfly flourish along the draining ditches include the azure damselfly.

== Gallery ==
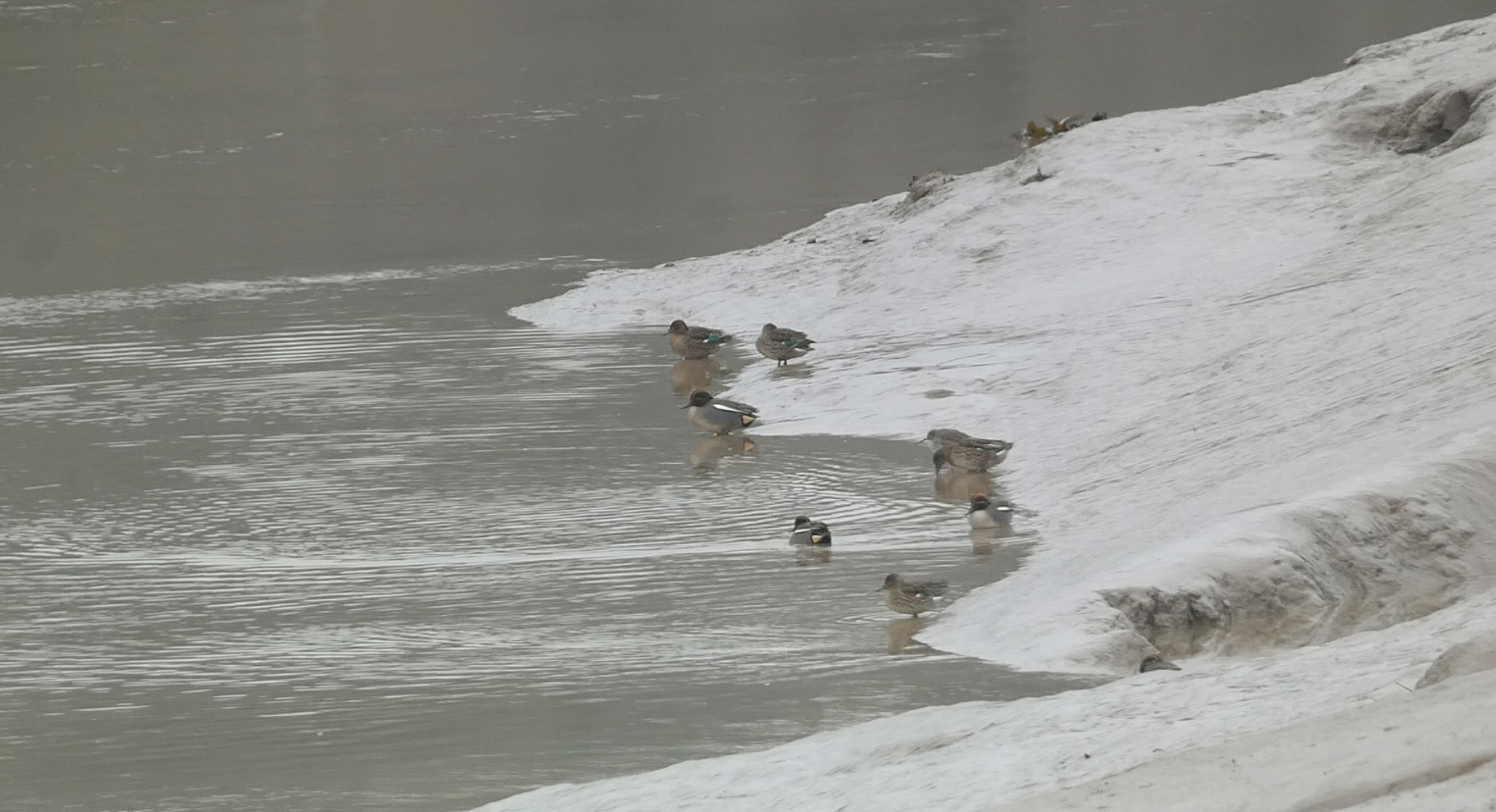
Teal and Sandpiper on intertidal area.

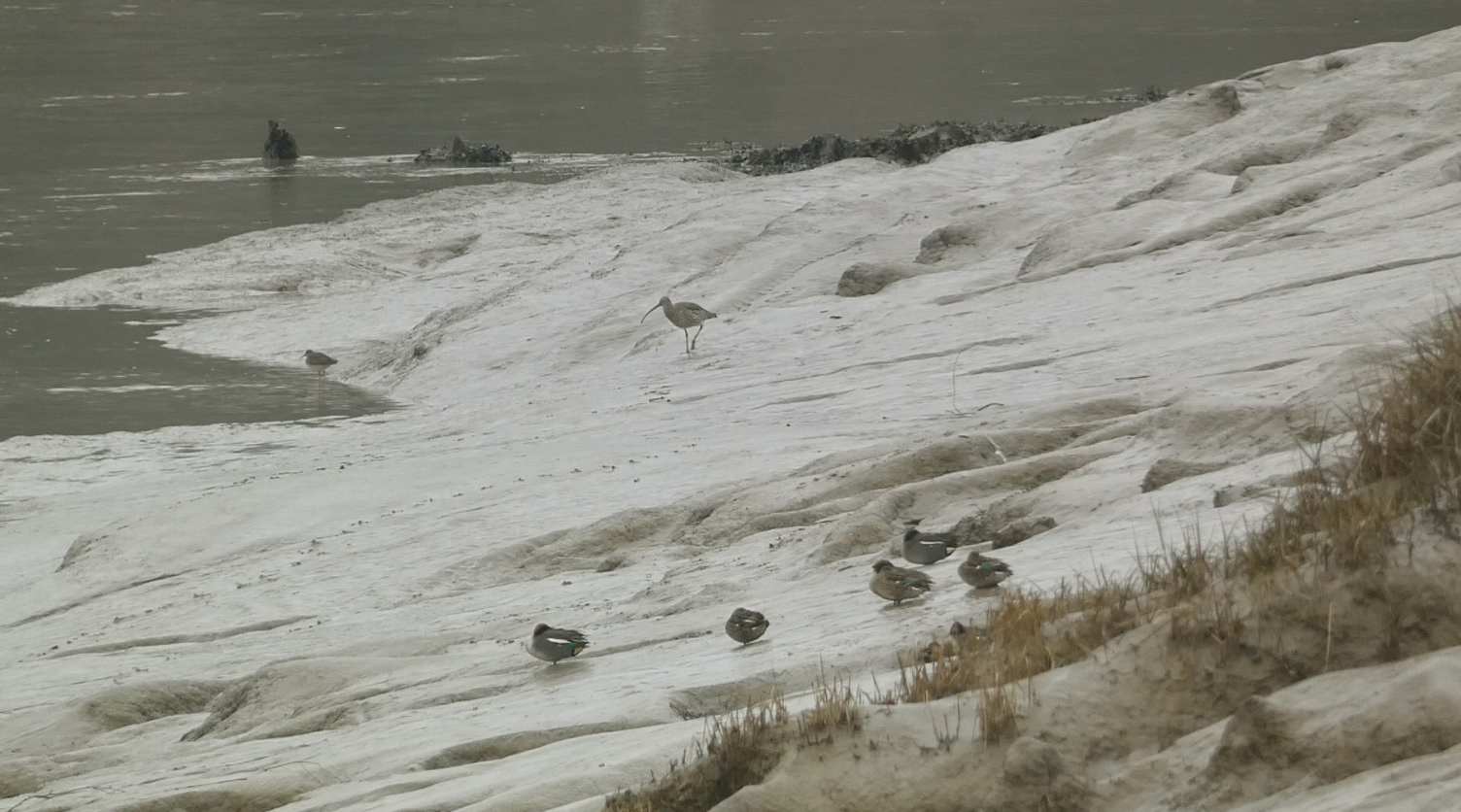
Teal, Sandpiper and a Curlew on the southwest of the site.

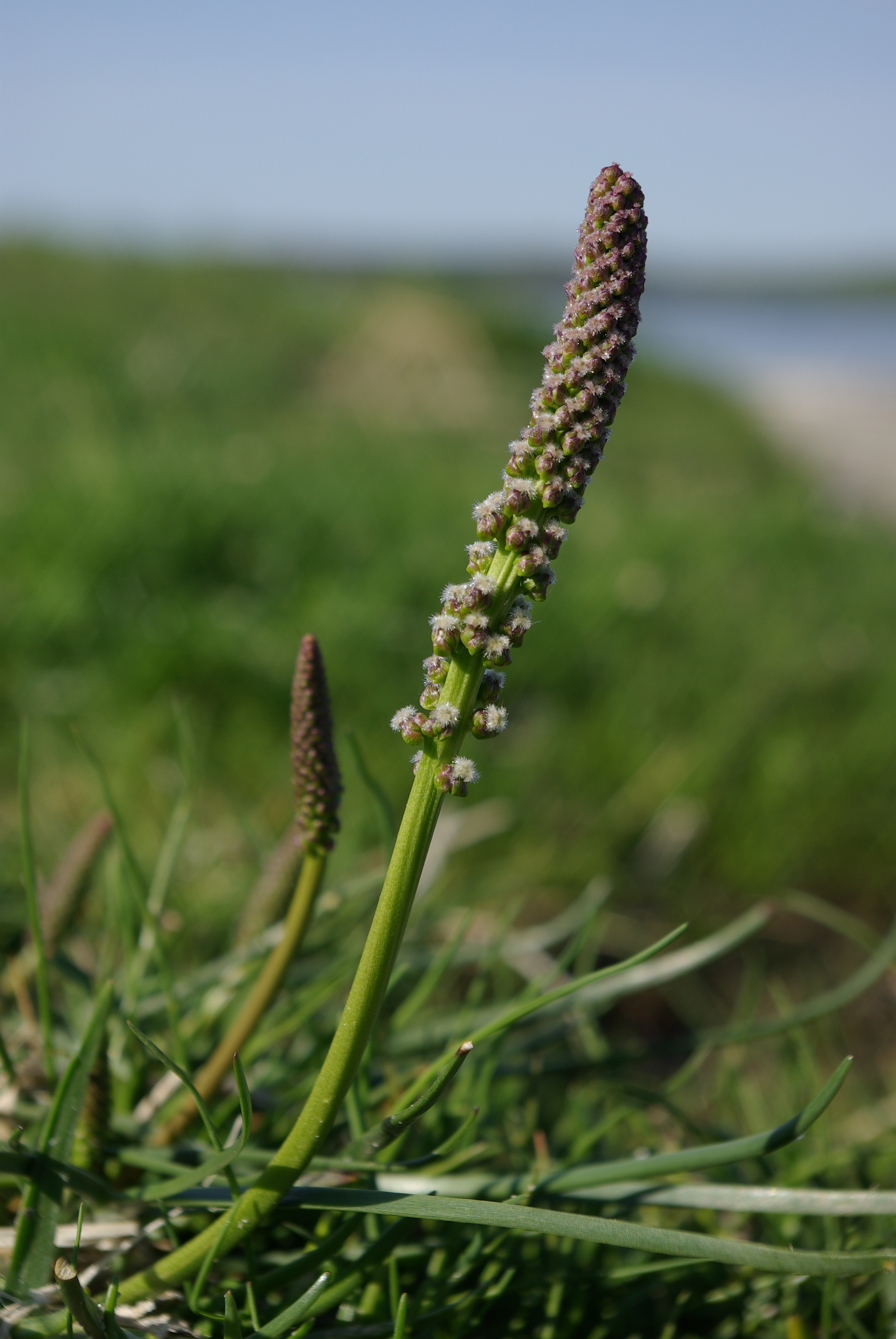
Sea arrowgrass (Triglochin maritima) is found at the site.

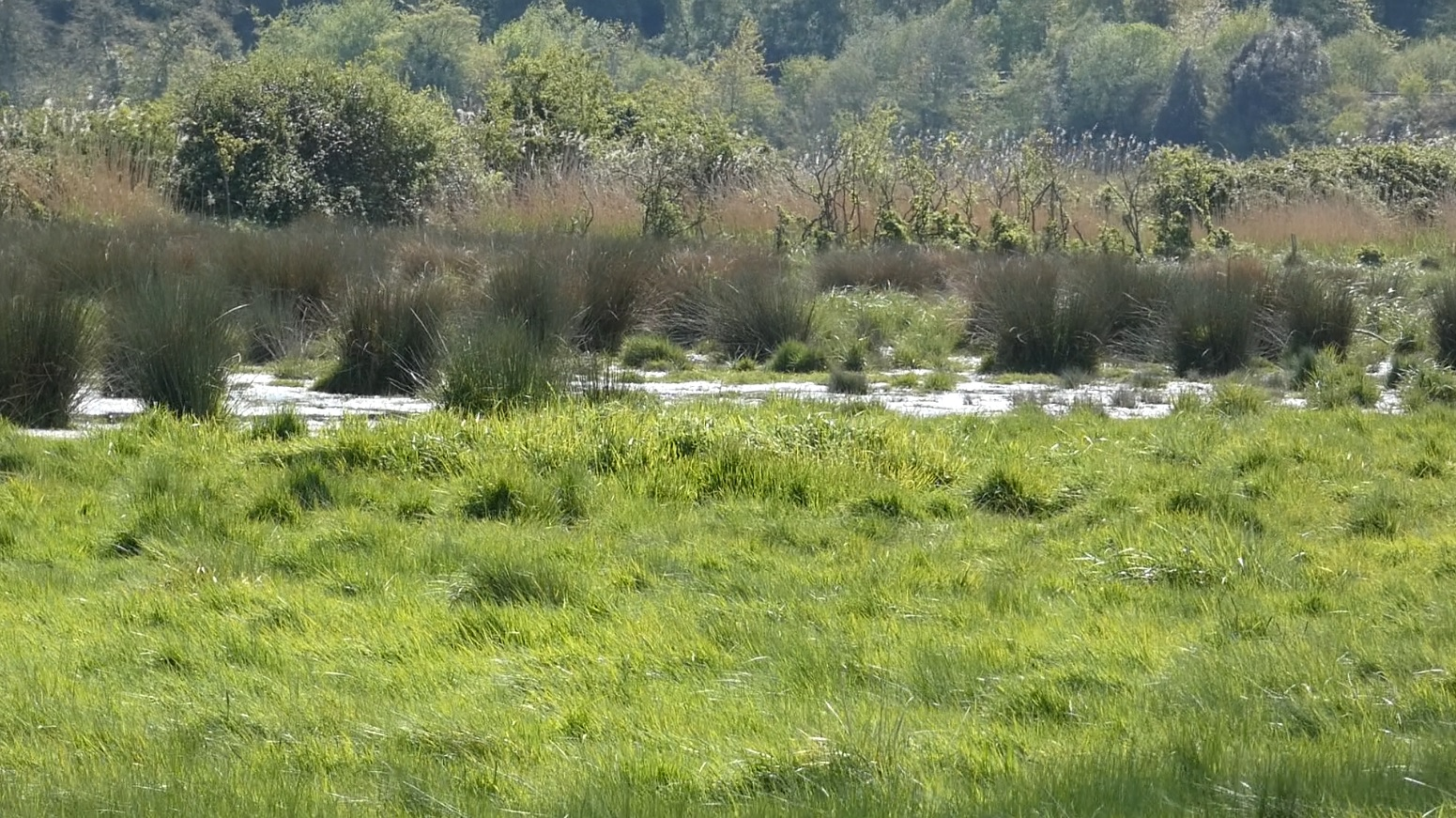
A variety of plant types growing.

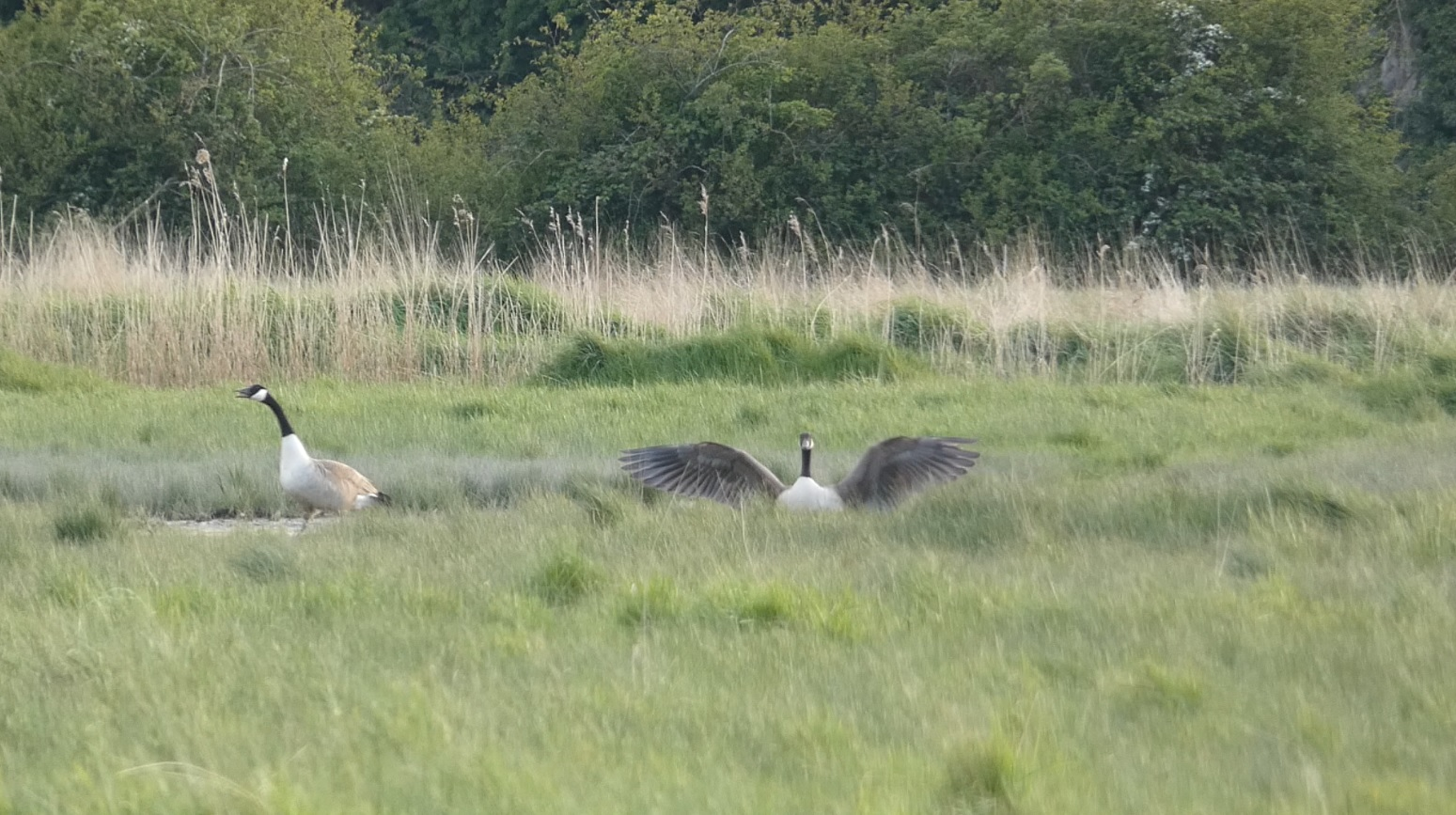
Canada geese are regular visitors.

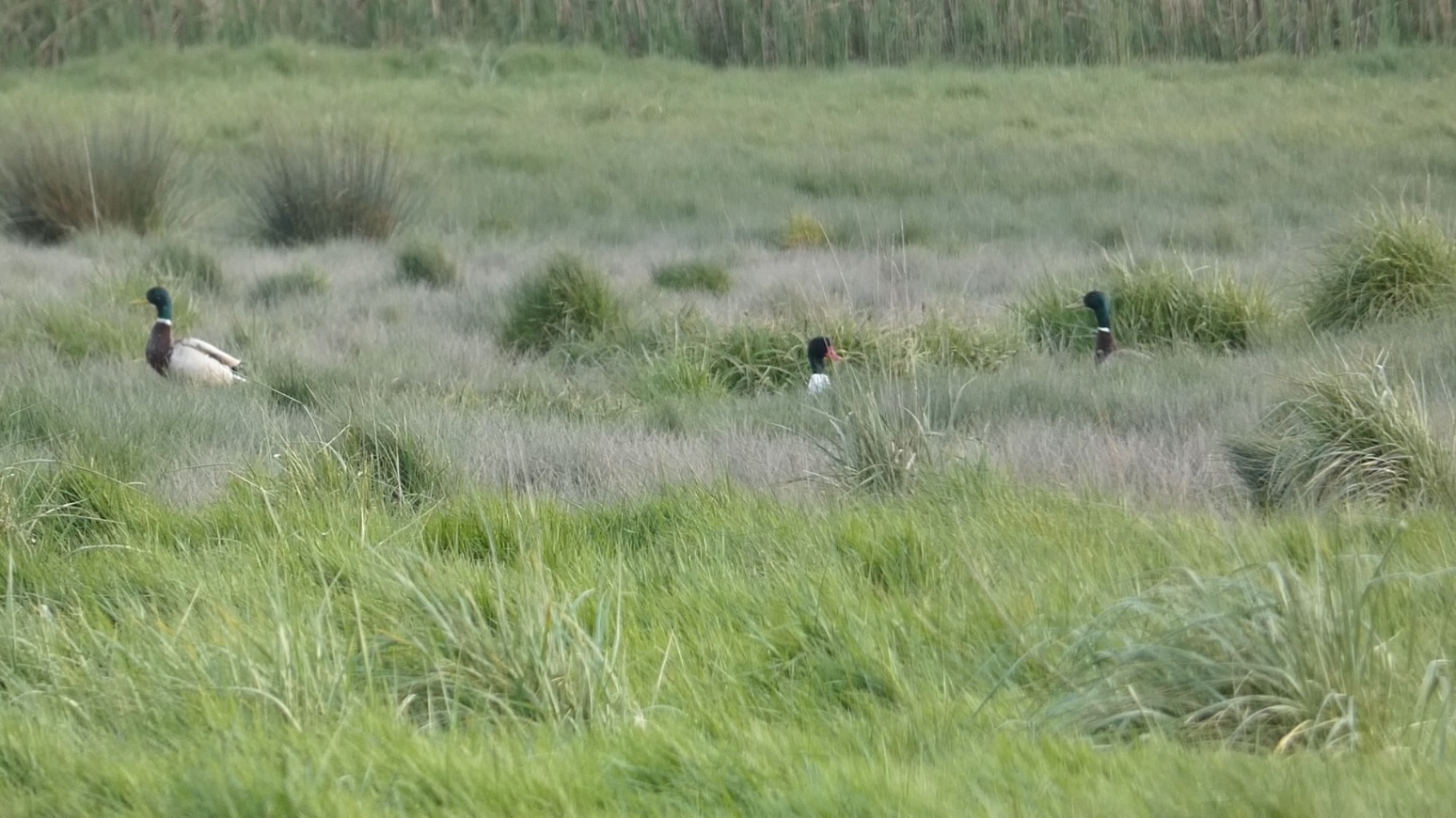
Mallards at the site.

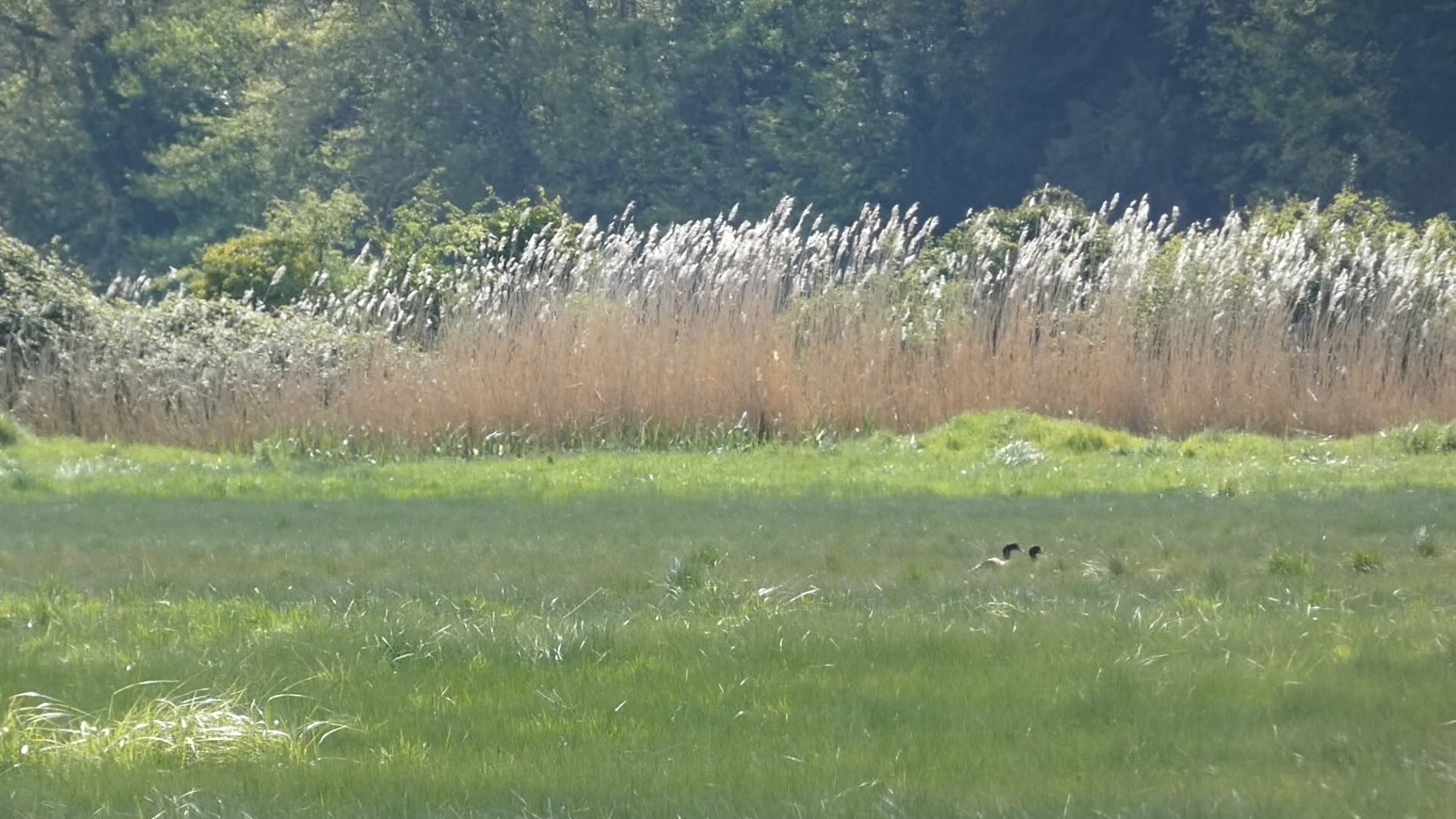
Shelduck use the Fields and nest in the cliffs.

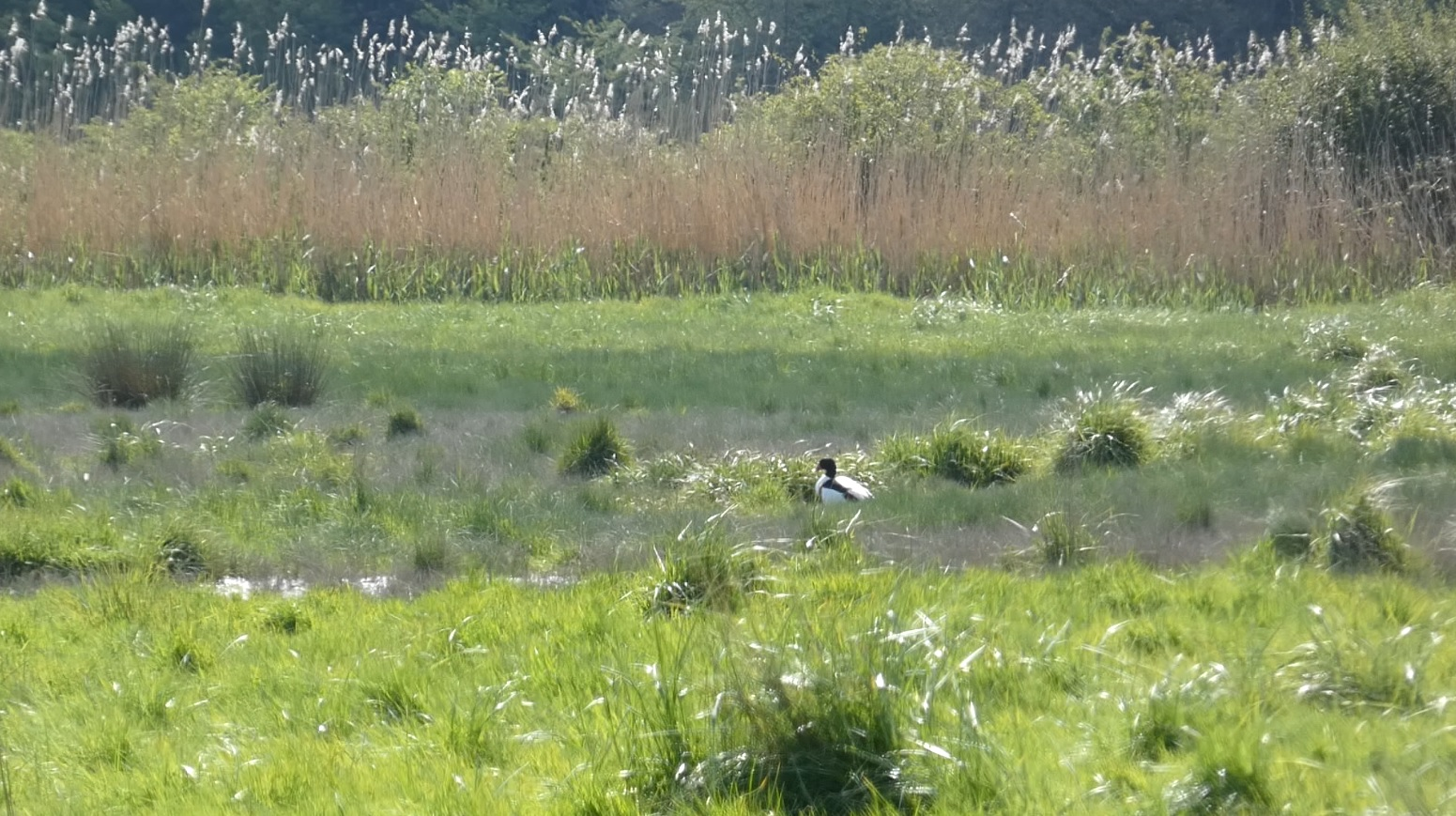
Shelduck on the Fields.

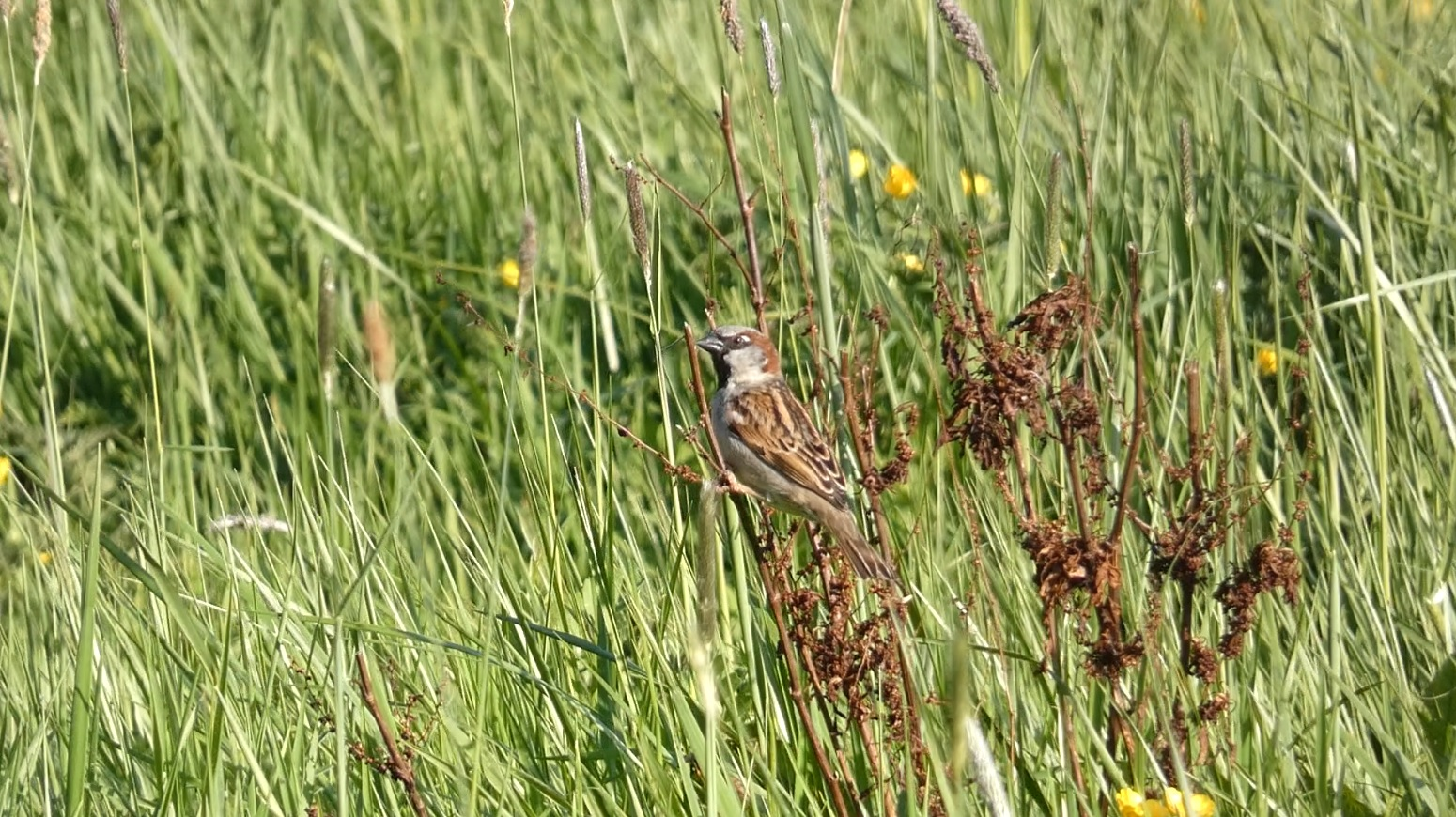
House sparrow at the Fields' margins.
