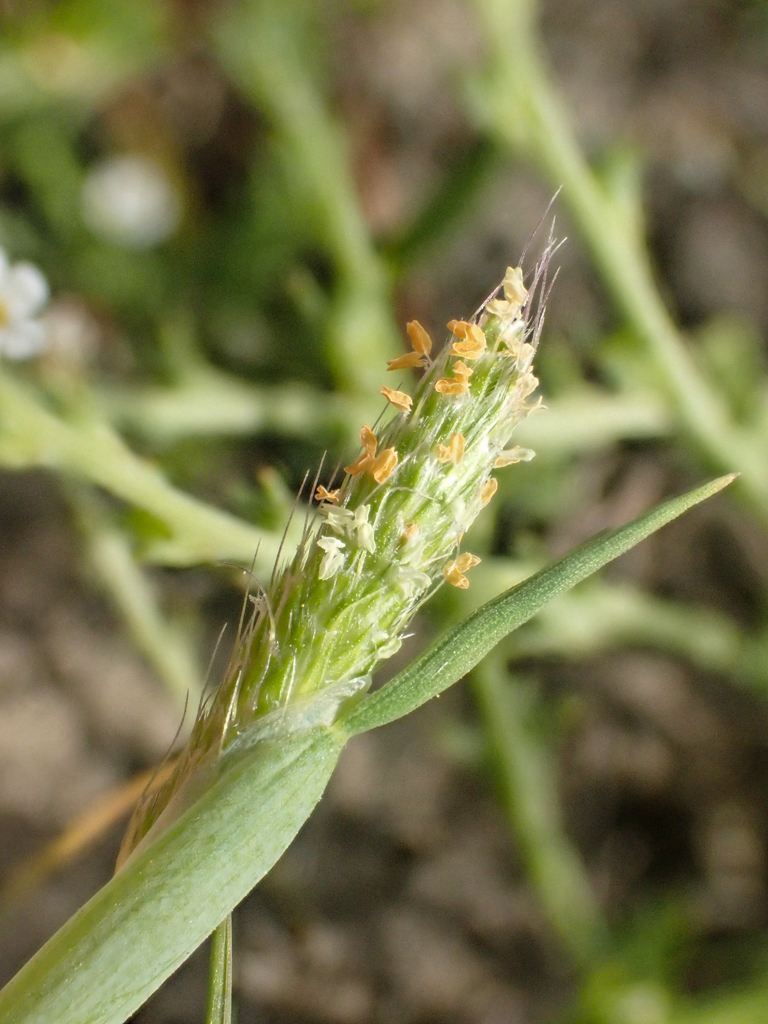

Conservation status
- Apparently Secure (NatureServe)

Scientific classification
- Kingdom: Plantae
- Clade: Tracheophytes
- Clade: Angiosperms
- Clade: Monocots
- Clade: Commelinids
- Order: Poales
- Family: Poaceae
- Subfamily: Pooideae
- Genus: Alopecurus
- Species: A. saccatus

Binomial name
- Alopecurus saccatus Vasey

Synonyms
- Alopecurus howellii

= Alopecurus saccatus =

Species of flowering plant

Alopecurus saccatus is a species of grass known by the common name Pacific foxtail, or Pacific meadow foxtail.

It is native the west coast of the United States from Washington to California, where it grows in moist areas at low elevations.

== Description ==
Alopecurus saccatus is an annual bunchgrass, forming tufts of stout, erect stems up to about 45 centimeters in maximum height. Leaves are up to 12 or 13 centimeters long. The inflorescence is a dense panicle up to 6 or 7 centimeters long which blooms in yellow to reddish brown anthers. The stems are 1.2 to 4.5 decimeters long. The upper sheath is inflated. The ligule is between 1.5 and 5.5 millimeters long. The blade is between 1 and 8 centimeters long and between 1 and 4 millimeters wide. The inflorescence is between 1.5 and 6.5 centimeters tall and 5.5 to 10 millimeters wide. The spikelets are between 3 and 5 millimeters long, with a bent and exceeding anthers. The flowering time is between the months of March and May. The culms are either erect or decumbent. The glumes are between 3 and 5 millimeters long, fused at the base, and the tips are obtuse. The lower lemmas margins are fused and glabrous. The anthers are either yellow or rusty brown in color. It has a quite similar habitat to Alopecurus aequalis and Alopecurus geniculatus, but those species have quite shorter glumes and awns.
