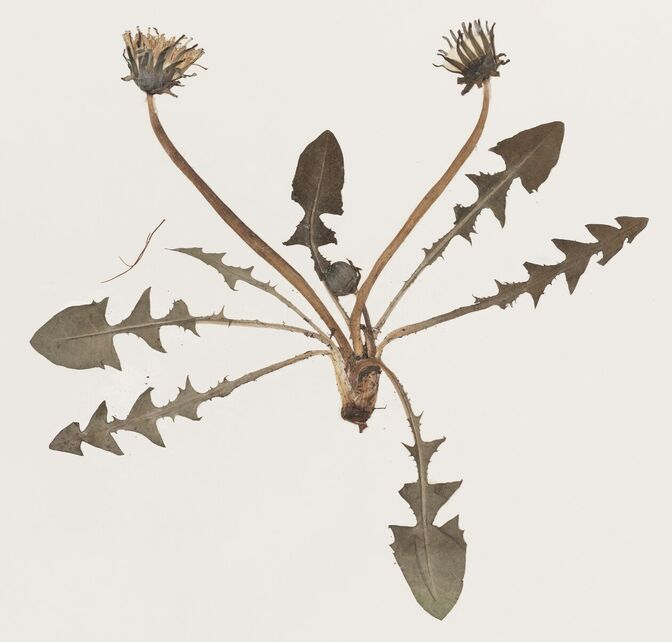

Scientific classification
- Kingdom: Plantae
- Clade: Tracheophytes
- Clade: Angiosperms
- Clade: Eudicots
- Clade: Asterids
- Order: Asterales
- Family: Asteraceae
- Genus: Taraxacum
- Species: T. akteum

Binomial name
- Taraxacum akteum Hagend., Soest & Zevenb.

= Taraxacum akteum =

Species of flowering plant

Taraxacum akteum, sometimes referred to as the Hampshire dandelion, is a rare and geographically restricted species of dandelion in the family Asteraceae. It is endemic to parts of Western Europe, occurring only in Great Britain and the coastal regions of the Netherlands. The species was first described in 1974 in Acta Botanica Neerlandica from specimens collected in slightly brackish meadows at Doornspijk and Rozenburg by Hagendijk, van Soest, and Zevenbergen. It belongs to the section Taraxacum section Celtica, a group of microspecies adapted to grassland habitats. T. akteum is most often found in temperate flood-meadow environments, where it grows in low-competition, seasonally moist soils. Its narrow ecological range and distinct morphology make it an uncommon and under-recorded member of Europe's dandelion flora.

== Description ==
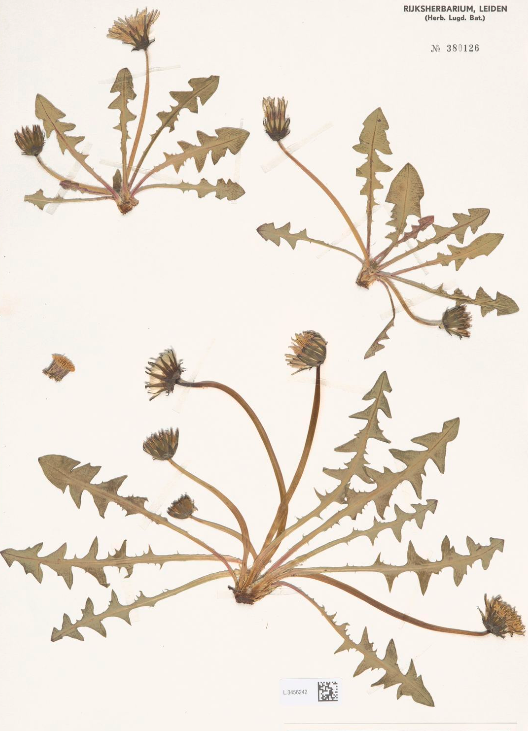
Several T. Akteum specimens collected in the Netherlands

Taraxacum akteum is a small, rare species of dandelion distinguished by its compact habit and several unique morphological features. Plants typically range from 10 to 25 cm in height and often grow appressed to the ground. The foliage is greyish-green, often faintly rose-tinged at the petiole, and generally subglabrous. Leaves are typically lobed, with 2–3 (occasionally up to 5) lateral lobes on each side. The lower lobes are dentiform, while the upper lobes are broadly triangular and slightly obtuse or acute, sometimes with a short, broad tooth on the back. The terminal lobe varies with leaf position, being short and deltoid in outer leaves and subhastate in inner leaves. Interlobes are short, occasionally dentate. A reddish tinge is often visible on the lower part of the midrib.

The flowering scapes are generally shorter than the leaves, often sigmoid-curved, and may be glabrous or bear cobwebby (arachnoid) hairs just below the capitulum. The involucral bracts are glossy dark green, about 14–15 mm long and 15 mm wide, with the outer bracts ovate, slightly appressed, and narrowly bordered with green margins up to 4 mm wide. The flower head is about 25–30 mm in diameter and yellow, with the marginal ligules distinctly striped on the reverse with dark violet to purplish-black. Anthers are fertile and produce pollen. Styles and stigmas are blackish to brownish in color.

Achenes are straw-colored, about 3.5 mm long including the pyramidal cone, which measures 0.3 mm. The body of the achene is slightly spinulose near the apex and otherwise smooth, gradually tapering into a short cone. The beak is slender, about 8 mm long, and terminates in a white pappus 4–4.5 mm in length.

== Taxonomy ==
Taraxacum akteum was first formally described in 1974 by J.M. Hagendijk, J.L. van Soest, and A.P.M. Zevenbergen in the journal Acta Botanica Neerlandica. The description was based on specimens collected from slightly brackish meadows in Doornspijk and Rozenburg in the Netherlands, where the species was observed growing alongside Taraxacum hollandicum, Alopecurus bulbosus, and Ranunculus sardous. The type specimen was collected on 17 April 1960 at Nieuwe Weg, Doornspijk, Gelderland.

The species is placed in the section Taraxacum section Celtica, a taxonomically complex group of dandelions often associated with temperate grasslands in Western Europe. Prior to its formal recognition, T. akteum had sometimes been misidentified as Taraxacum intermedium, but later work, including that of H. Øllgaard, clarified that T. akteum is morphologically distinct, particularly in the broader marginal leaf lobes and less darkened involucral bracts. True T. intermedium has not been confirmed from the Netherlands.

The name akteum is of unknown origin but was assigned by the original authors in their 1974 diagnosis.

== Distribution and habitat ==
Taraxacum akteum is a geographically restricted species, occurring exclusively in coastal areas of the Netherlands and in parts of Great Britain. It was first described in 1974 from slightly brackish meadows in the Dutch localities of Doornspijk and Rozenburg, where it was found growing alongside species such as Taraxacum hollandicum, Alopecurus bulbosus, and Ranunculus sardous. These habitats are characterized by periodically moist, slightly saline soils and low competition, offering a favorable niche for this microspecies.

In the Netherlands, T. akteum has been recorded in formerly brackish grasslands and floodplain meadows, particularly along the North Sea coast. Historical specimens are housed in regional herbaria, including the Hydrobiological Institute's Delta Research collection and the IJsselmeer herbarium.

In Great Britain, T. akteum is found in temperate MG4 flood-meadow grasslands, which are species-rich communities dominated by tall grasses and noted for their high vascular plant diversity. Within this habitat, it forms part of a distinctive and often under-recorded assemblage of dandelion microspecies. The species was first documented in Britain in 2016 from a meadow at Morchard Bishop in North Devon, where its identification was later confirmed by the dandelion specialist A.J. Richards.

The species favors calcareous or neutral soils that are seasonally moist but well-drained, and its association with slightly brackish environments suggests some tolerance for mild salinity. Its narrow distribution and specialized habitat preferences contribute to its rarity and make it of interest in dandelion taxonomy and conservation.
