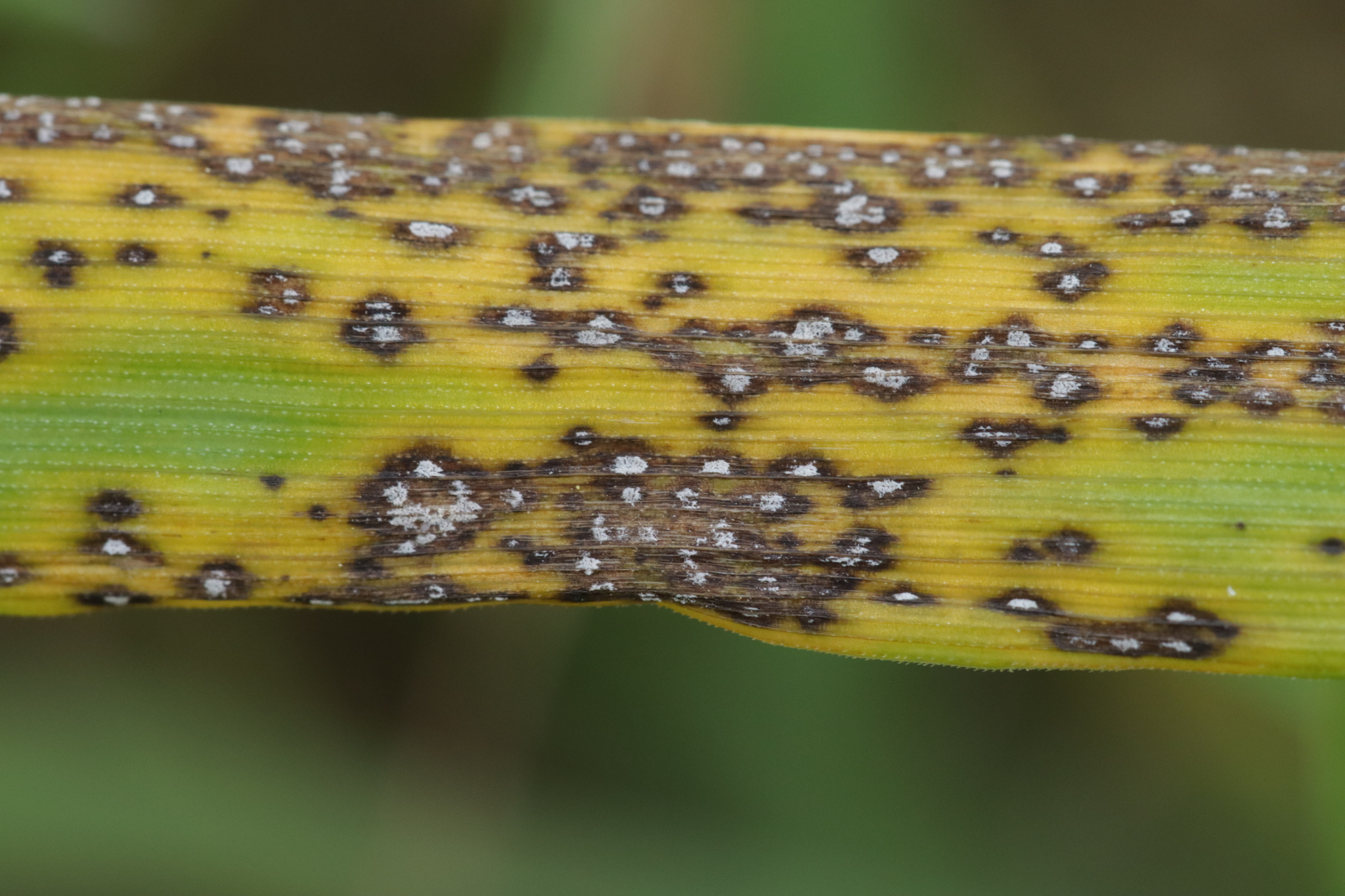
- Leaf spots caused by Mastigosporium album on a leaf of Alopecurus pratensis.

Scientific classification
- Kingdom: Fungi
- Division: Ascomycota
- Class: Leotiomycetes
- Order: Helotiales
- Family: Ploettnerulaceae
- Genus: Mastigosporium

= Mastigosporium =

Genus of fungi

Mastigosporium is a genus of fungi which cause leaf spots on the leaves of grasses.

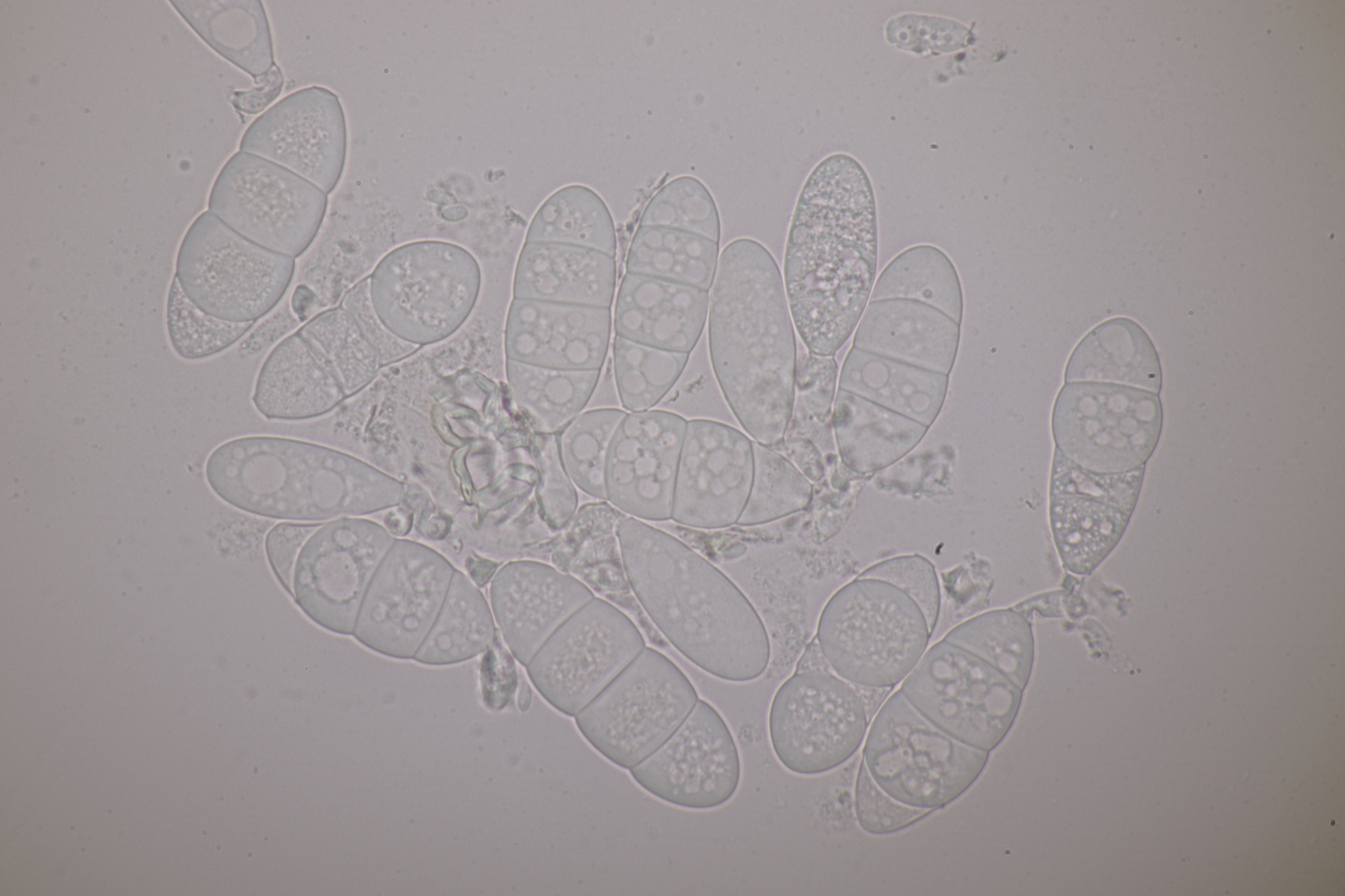
Conidia of Mastigosporium muticum under high magnification
