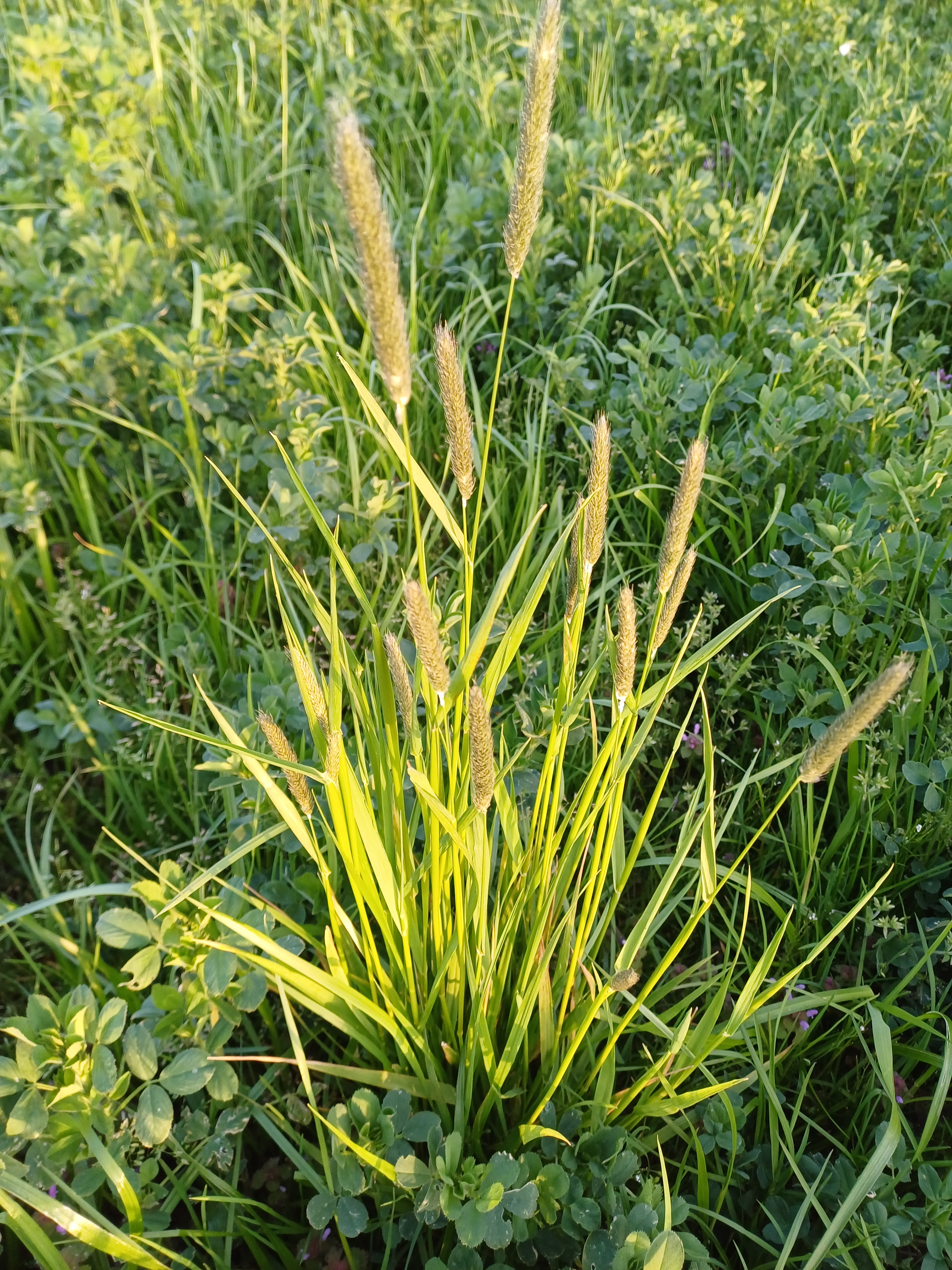

Conservation status
- Least Concern (IUCN 3.1)

Scientific classification
- Kingdom: Plantae
- Clade: Embryophytes
- Clade: Tracheophytes
- Clade: Angiosperms
- Clade: Monocots
- Clade: Commelinids
- Order: Poales
- Family: Poaceae
- Subfamily: Pooideae
- Genus: Alopecurus
- Species: A. pratensis

Binomial name
- Alopecurus pratensis L.

= Alopecurus pratensis =

Species of flowering plant in the grass family

Alopecurus pratensis, known as the meadow foxtail or the field meadow foxtail, is a perennial grass belonging to the grass family (Poaceae). It is native to Europe and Asia.

It is a common plant is found on grasslands, especially on neutral soils. It is found on moist, fertile soils, but avoids waterlogged, light or dry soils. It forms dense swards leading to low botanical diversity and is widely cultivated for pasture and hay, and has become naturalised in many areas outside its native range, including Australia and North America.

== Description ==
It flowers from April until June – one of the earliest grasses to do so. Any survey work carried out in mid-summer may miss the grass as a result of this.

It can grow to a height of about 110 centimetres (43 in). The stem is erect and hard at the shaft, the sheathes being smooth and cylindrical. The leaves are about 5 millimetres (0.20 in) wide and hairless. Meadow foxtail has a cylindrical inflorescence with glumes about 5–10 millimetres (0.20–0.39 in) wide and spikelets about 4–6 millimetres (0.16–0.24 in) long.

The ligule is 1–2.5 millimetres (0.039–0.098 in) long, with a slightly tattered top.

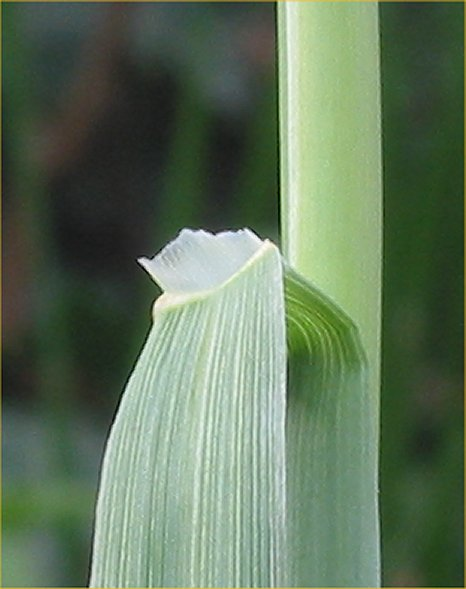
Ligule has a slightly tattered top.

== Similarity to other grassland species ==
Alopecurus pratensis has two common relatives, marsh foxtail (Alopecurus geniculatus) and black grass (A. myosuroides). It is often confused with timothy (Phleum pratense). Timothy flowers later, from June until August. Its spikelets have twin hornlike projections arranged in cylindrical panicles, while meadow foxtail has a single soft awn.

== Ecology ==
The caterpillars of some lepidopterans use it as a foodplant, e.g. the Essex skipper (Thymelicus lineola). Additionally, male mosquitoes can often be found on this flower drinking the nectar out of it.

It is a known host to fungi. These include:

- Cladosporium phlei
- Claviceps purpurea
- Blumeria graminis
- Mastigosporium album
- Mastigosporium rubricosum
- Periconia hispidula
- Phaeoseptoria poae
- Rhynchosporium orthosporum
