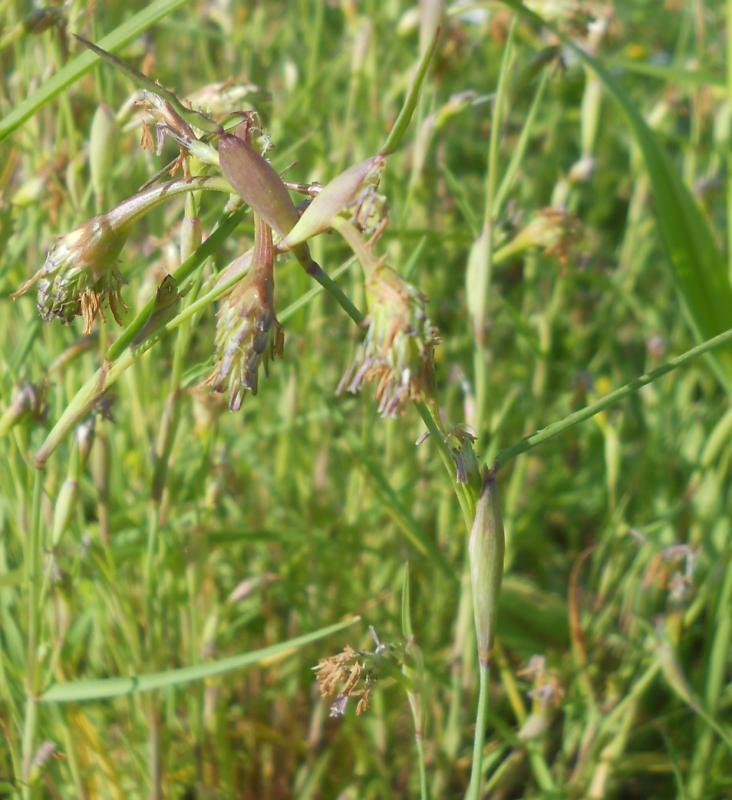

Scientific classification
- Kingdom: Plantae
- Clade: Tracheophytes
- Clade: Angiosperms
- Clade: Monocots
- Clade: Commelinids
- Order: Poales
- Family: Poaceae
- Subfamily: Pooideae
- Genus: Alopecurus
- Species: A. cucullatus

Binomial name
- Alopecurus cucullatus (L.) Raspail

Synonyms
- Alopecurus cornucopiae Trin.; Cornucopiae cucullatum L. (1753) (basionym)

= Alopecurus cucullatus =

Species of plant

Alopecurus cucullatus is a species of grass in the family Poaceae (true grasses). It is an annual native to Italy, Sicily, Malta, Greece, Turkey, the Levant, and northern Iraq.

== Sources ==
This article incorporates text from a free content work. Licensed under CC0 (license statement/permission). Text taken from Cornucopiae cucullatum. Encyclopedia of Life.
