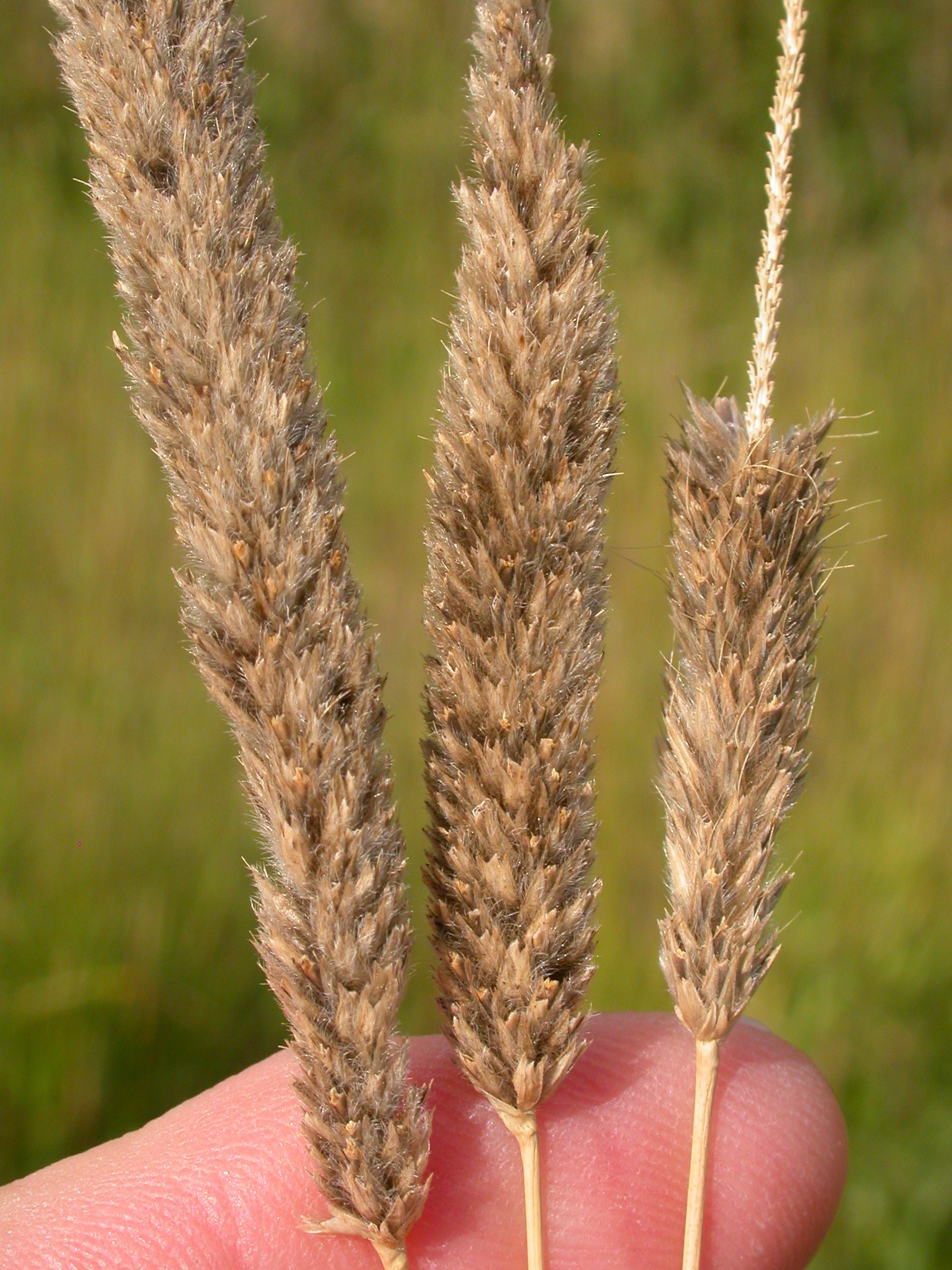

Conservation status
- Least Concern (IUCN 3.1)

Scientific classification
- Kingdom: Plantae
- Clade: Tracheophytes
- Clade: Angiosperms
- Clade: Monocots
- Clade: Commelinids
- Order: Poales
- Family: Poaceae
- Subfamily: Pooideae
- Genus: Alopecurus
- Species: A. arundinaceus

Binomial name
- Alopecurus arundinaceus Poir.

Synonyms
- Alopecurus pratensis subsp. brachystachys Bratt & Trab; Alopecurus ventricosus Pers. non (Gouan) Huds.; Gastridium ventricosum (Gouan) Schinz & Thell.

= Alopecurus arundinaceus =

Species of grass

Alopecurus arundinaceus, the creeping meadow foxtail or creeping foxtail, is a rhizomatous perennial species in the Grass family (Poaceae). Native to Eurasia and northern Africa, and widely introduced elsewhere, this sod forming grass is useful as a forage and for erosion control. It flowers between April and July, depending on its location. It grows in damp or saline grasslands and banks of waterways, and on mountains up to 1,200 m. However, according to the United States Bureau of Plant, Alopecurus arundinaceus was found at elevations up to 8500–9500 feet.
