= Alopecurus setarioides =

Conservation status
- Least Concern (IUCN 3.1)

Scientific classification
- Kingdom: Plantae
- Clade: Tracheophytes
- Clade: Angiosperms
- Clade: Monocots
- Clade: Commelinids
- Order: Poales
- Family: Poaceae
- Subfamily: Pooideae
- Genus: Alopecurus
- Species: A. setarioides

Binomial name
- Alopecurus setarioides Gren.

Synonyms
- Alopecurus neglectus Azn.

Species of grass

Alopecurus setarioides is a species of foxtail grass that is found in France, Greece, Italy and Turkey. It prefers wet places, including ditches.
