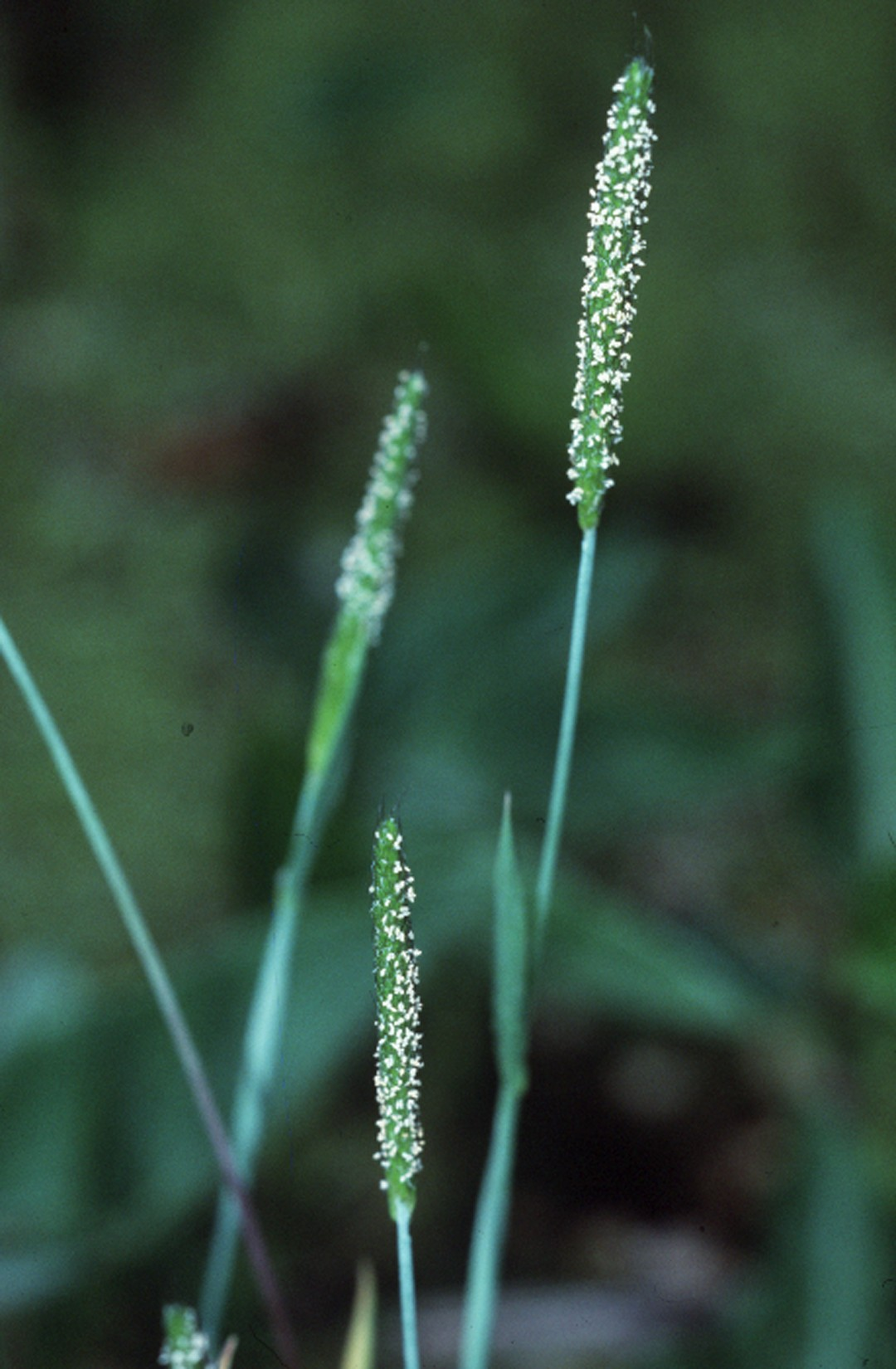

Conservation status
- Least Concern (IUCN 3.1)

Scientific classification
- Kingdom: Plantae
- Clade: Tracheophytes
- Clade: Angiosperms
- Clade: Monocots
- Clade: Commelinids
- Order: Poales
- Family: Poaceae
- Subfamily: Pooideae
- Genus: Alopecurus
- Species: A. carolinianus

Binomial name
- Alopecurus carolinianus Walt.

= Alopecurus carolinianus =

Species of flowering plant

Alopecurus carolinianus is a species of grass known by the common names Carolina foxtail and tufted foxtail.

== Distribution ==
It is native to much of North America, including most of the United States and western Canada. It may be an introduced species in many areas, however. It is most common in moist areas.

== Description ==
This is an annual bunchgrass forming tufts of erect stems up to about half a meter tall. The leaves are 8 to 15 centimeters in maximum length. The inflorescence is dense, cylindrical, and only a few centimeters long. It blooms in yellow to bright orange anthers.
