= Alopecurus creticus =

Conservation status
- Least Concern (IUCN 3.1)

Scientific classification
- Kingdom: Plantae
- Clade: Tracheophytes
- Clade: Angiosperms
- Clade: Monocots
- Clade: Commelinids
- Order: Poales
- Family: Poaceae
- Subfamily: Pooideae
- Genus: Alopecurus
- Species: A. creticus

Binomial name
- Alopecurus creticus Trin.

Synonyms
- Alopecurus agrestis Sieber ex Kunth; Alopecurus thracicus Penev & Kouharov

Species of grass

Alopecurus creticus, the Cretan meadow foxtail, is a species of foxtail grass.

It is a bunchgrass native to Bulgaria, Serbia, North Macedonia, Greece, the east Aegean Islands, Crete and Turkey. It can be found in marshes and wet places near sea level, and wet grasslands near freshwater sub-saline grassy flats.

It is threatened by coastal development and marsh draining.
