= Peter Rubtzoff =

Russian botanist (1920–1995)

- Born: 14 February 1920
- Died: 1995
- Scientific career
- Fields: Botany, entomology
- Thesis: A phytogeographical analysis of the Pitkin Marsh (1953)
- Author abbrev. (botany): P.Rubtzoff

Peter Rubtzoff (Пётр Рубцов, Pyotr Rubtsov; 14 February 1920 – 1995) was a Russian-American botanist and entomologist. He specialized in the study of wetlands and aquatic plants. He was an authority on plants in Sonoma County.

== Biography ==
Rubtzoff was born in Leningrad on 14 February 1920. He attended gymnasium in Riga, Latvia.

After becoming a refugee in the wake of World War II, he studied botany and zoology at the University of Innsbruck in Austria. He worked under botanist Helmut Gams.

Rubtzoff immigrated to the United States in 1949, and subsequently attended the University of San Francisco. In 1953, he earned an additional degree in biology and a M.Sc. in botany. He later became a field associate at the California Academy of Sciences and worked closely with John Thomas Howell.

Rubtzoff, Howell, and Peter Raven co-authored the 1958 A Flora of San Francisco, California, considered a thorough publication.

Rubtzoff was later employed by the Department of Entomology at the University of California, Berkeley from 1972 to 1988. He made important contributions to The Jepson Manual, specifically about species of rush.

He died in 1995.
