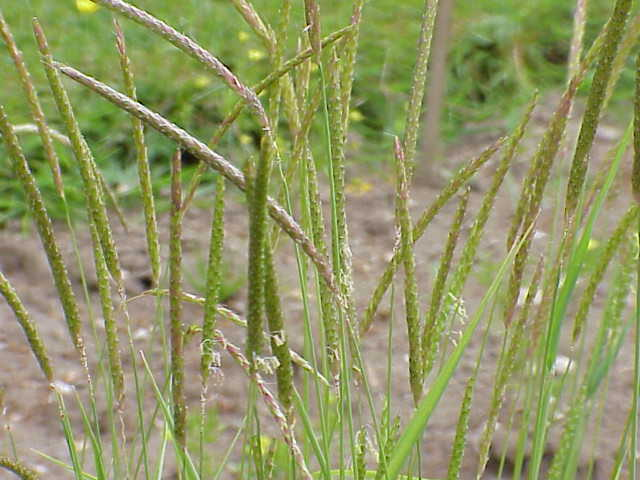
- Slender meadow foxtail (Alopecurus myosuroides)

Scientific classification
- Kingdom: Plantae
- Clade: Tracheophytes
- Clade: Angiosperms
- Clade: Monocots
- Clade: Commelinids
- Order: Poales
- Family: Poaceae
- Subfamily: Pooideae
- Supertribe: Poodae
- Tribe: Poeae
- Subtribe: Alopecurinae
- Genus: Alopecurus; L.

Type species
- Alopecurus pratus L.

Synonyms
- Alopecuropsis Opiz; Cerdosurus Ehrh.; Colobachne P.Beauv.; Cornucopiae L.; Tozzettia Savi

= Alopecurus =

Foxtail grass

Genus of flowering plants in the grass family

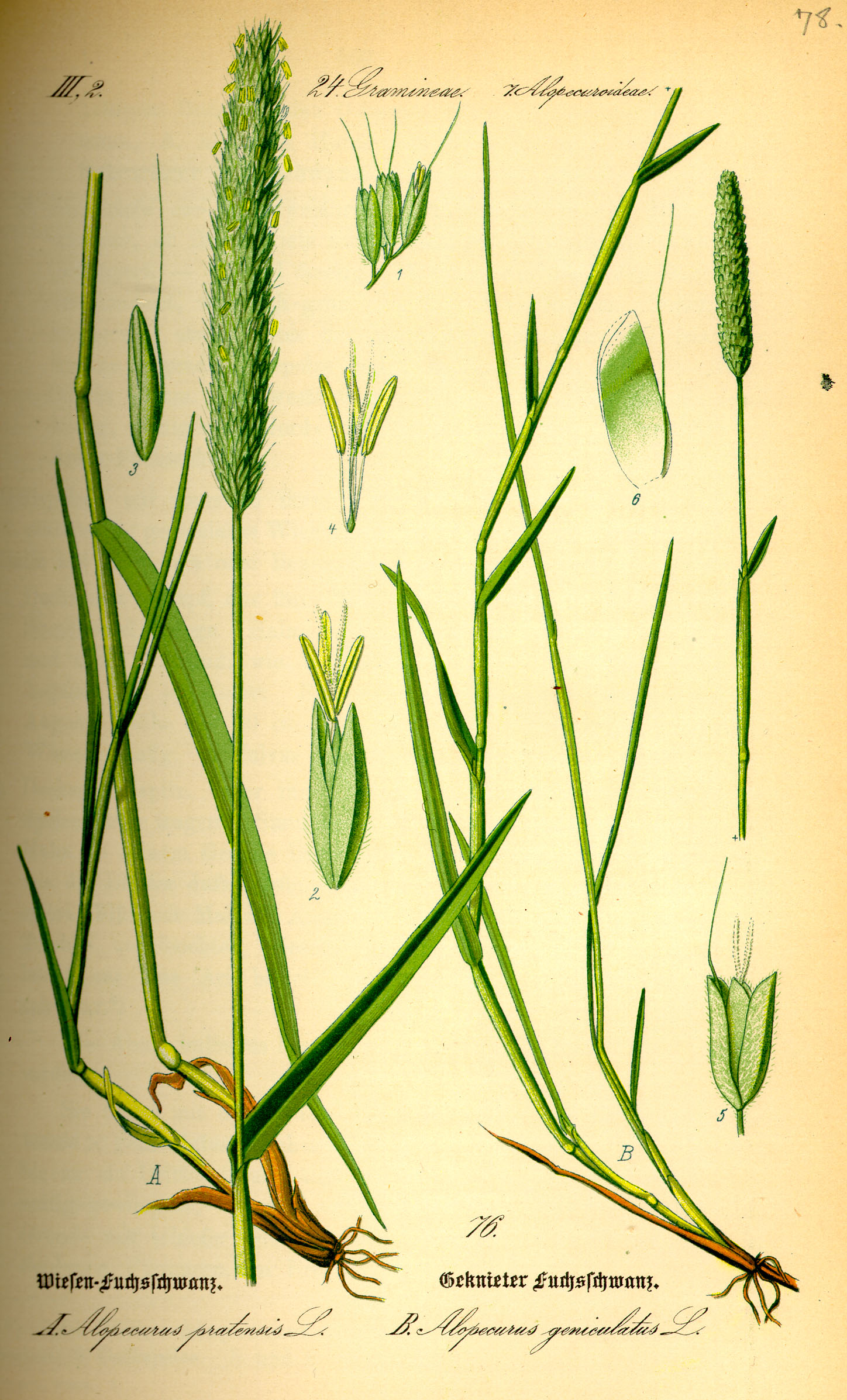
Meadow foxtail (Alopecurus pratensis)

Alopecurus, or foxtail grass, is a common and widespread genus of plants in the grass family. It is common across temperate and subtropical parts of Eurasia, northern Africa, and the Americas, as well as naturalized in Australia and on various islands.

Foxtails can be annual or perennial. They grow in tufts. They have flat leaves and blunt ligules (a small flap at the junction of leaf and stem). Their inflorescence is a dense panicle (a branching head without terminal flower) with 1-flowered spikelets. A few, particularly A. myosuroides, are considered weeds, others are very decorative and are used in bouquets of dried flowers.

== Species ==
43 species are accepted.

- Alopecurus aequalis Sobol. – Orange foxtail, shortawn foxtail – Eurasia, Americas
- Alopecurus albovii Tzvelev – Caucasus
- Alopecurus alopecuroides (L.) L.J.Gillespie, Cabi & Soreng – Syria and Israel
- Alopecurus anatolicus Dogan – eastern Turkey
- Alopecurus apiatus Ovcz. – Kyrgyzstan, Tajikistan, Afghanistan, Iraq, Iran
- Alopecurus arundinaceus – Reed foxtail, creeping foxtail, creeping meadow foxtail – Eurasia, North Africa
- Alopecurus aucheri Poir. – Caucasus, Turkey, Iran
- Alopecurus baptarrhenius S.M.Phillips – Ethiopia
- Alopecurus bonariensis Parodi & Thell. – Argentina, Uruguay
- Alopecurus borii Tzvelev – Turkmenistan
- Alopecurus bornmuelleri Domin – Palestine
- Alopecurus brachystachus M.Bieb. – Russia, China, Mongolia
- Alopecurus × brachystylus Peterm. – western and northern Europe and Siberia
- Alopecurus bulbosus Gouan – Bulbous foxtail – Mediterranean, western Europe
- Alopecurus carolinianus Walter – tufted meadow foxtail – US, western Canada
- Alopecurus creticus Trin. – Greece, Turkey, Balkans
- Alopecurus cucullatus (L.) Raspail – central and eastern Mediterranean
- Alopecurus dasyanthus Tratv. – Caucasus, Iran
- Alopecurus davisii Bor – Samos Island in Greece
- Alopecurus geniculatus L. – Bent foxtail, marsh meadow foxtail – Algeria, Eurasia
- Alopecurus gerardii Vill. – Mediterranean
- Alopecurus goekyigitianus Cabi & Soreng – Turkey
- Alopecurus glacialis K.Koch – Caucasus, Turkey, Iran, Afghanistan
- Alopecurus × haussknechtianus Asch. & Graebn. – central + northwestern Europe
- Alopecurus heliochloides Hack. – Chile
- Alopecurus himalaicus Hook.f. – Himalayas, Pakistan, Afghanistan, Iran, Central Asia, Xinjiang
- Alopecurus hitchcockii Parodi – Peru, Bolivia, Jujuy
- Alopecurus japonicus Steud. – China, Japan, Korea
- Alopecurus laguroides Balansa – Caucasus, Turkey
- Alopecurus lanatus Sm. – Turkey
- Alopecurus longiaristatus Maxim. – Heilongjiang, Primorye, Khabarovsk
- Alopecurus magellanicus Lam. – northern Eurasia, North + South America, Falkland Is, South Georgia
- Alopecurus × marssonii Hausskn. – Ukraine
- Alopecurus mucronatus Hack. – Iran, Afghanistan, Tajikistan
- Alopecurus myosuroides Huds. – Slender meadow foxtail, black grass, twitch grass, black twitch – Eurasia, North Africa
- Alopecurus nepalensis Trin. ex Steud. – Himalayas, Tajikistan, Turkmenistan
- Alopecurus × plettkei Mattf. – France, Germany, Belgium, Netherlands
- Alopecurus ponticus K.Koch – Caucasus
- Alopecurus pratensis L. – meadow foxtail – Eurasia from Azores to Mongolia
- Alopecurus rendlei Eig – central + southern Europe, Algeria, Libya, Turkey
- Alopecurus saccatus Vasey – Pacific foxtail – United States (WA OR ID CA), Baja California
- Alopecurus setarioides Gren. – France, Greece, Italy, Balkans, Turkey
- Alopecurus textilis Boiss. – Turkey, Caucasus, Syria, Iraq, Iran, Turkmenistan
- Alopecurus turczaninovii O.D.Nikif. – Siberia
- Alopecurus × turicensis Brügger – France, Switzerland
- Alopecurus tzvelevii V.A.Agaf., Laktionov, Yu.E.Alexeev & Mavrodiev – central European Russia
- Alopecurus utriculatus Banks & Sol. – Greece, Turkey, Iraq, Iran, Cyprus, Syria, Lebanon, Palestine
- Alopecurus vaginatus (Willd.) Pall. ex Kunth – Crimea, Caucasus, Turkey, Middle East, Iran, Afghanistan
- Alopecurus × winklerianus Asch. & Graebn. – France, Switzerland, Germany, Poland

== Formerly included ==
Numerous species once considered part of Alopecurus but now regarded as better suited to other genera: Agrostis, Crypsis, Koeleria, Milium, Muhlenbergia, Pennisetum, Perotis, Phleum, Polypogon, Rostraria, Setaria and Tribolium.

== See also ==
- List of Poaceae genera
