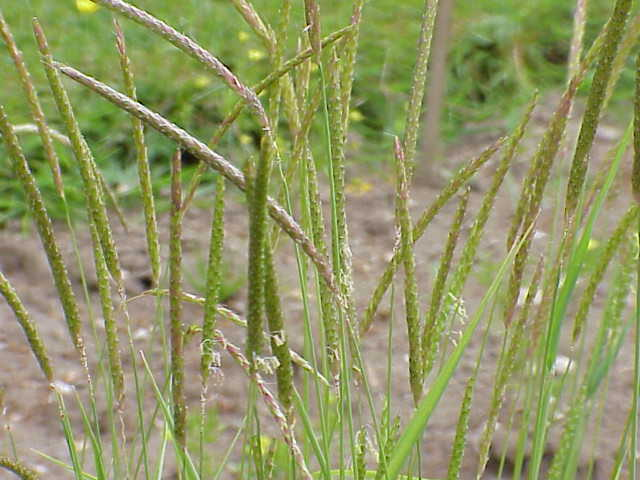

Scientific classification
- Kingdom: Plantae
- Clade: Tracheophytes
- Clade: Angiosperms
- Clade: Monocots
- Clade: Commelinids
- Order: Poales
- Family: Poaceae
- Subfamily: Pooideae
- Genus: Alopecurus
- Species: A. myosuroides

Binomial name
- Alopecurus myosuroides Huds.

Synonyms
- Alopecurus adonensis Dogan; Alopecurus affinis Desv.; Alopecurus agrestis L.; Alopecurus purpurascens Link; Phleum flavum Scop.; Tozzetia agrestis (L.)Bubani

= Alopecurus myosuroides =

Species of grass

Alopecurus myosuroides is an annual grass, native to Eurasia, found in moist meadows, deciduous forests, and on cultivated and waste land. It is also known as slender meadow foxtail, black-grass, twitch grass, and black twitch.

== Description ==
It can grow up to 80 cm high, often growing in tufts. The leaves are hairless. Leaf sheath is smooth, green to purplish in colour. The leaf blade is pointed, 3 to 16 cm long and 2-8 millimeters wide, green, rough in texture. The spikelets are cylindrical, yellow-green, pale green or purple in colour, and may be 1-12 centimeters long.

It flowers from May to August.

== Weed status ==
In the UK, where it is known to farmers as black-grass, it is a major weed of cereal crops as it produces a large amount of seed which is shed before the crop is cut. It has developed resistance to a range of herbicides used to control it. Herbicide resistance testing is often needed to understand what herbicides will be effective at treating it. It can occur at very high densities, competing with the crop and seriously reducing the yield of crops such as wheat and barley if not controlled.

The seeds have a short period of dormancy and viability, and the numbers may be reduced by surface cultivation after harvest.
