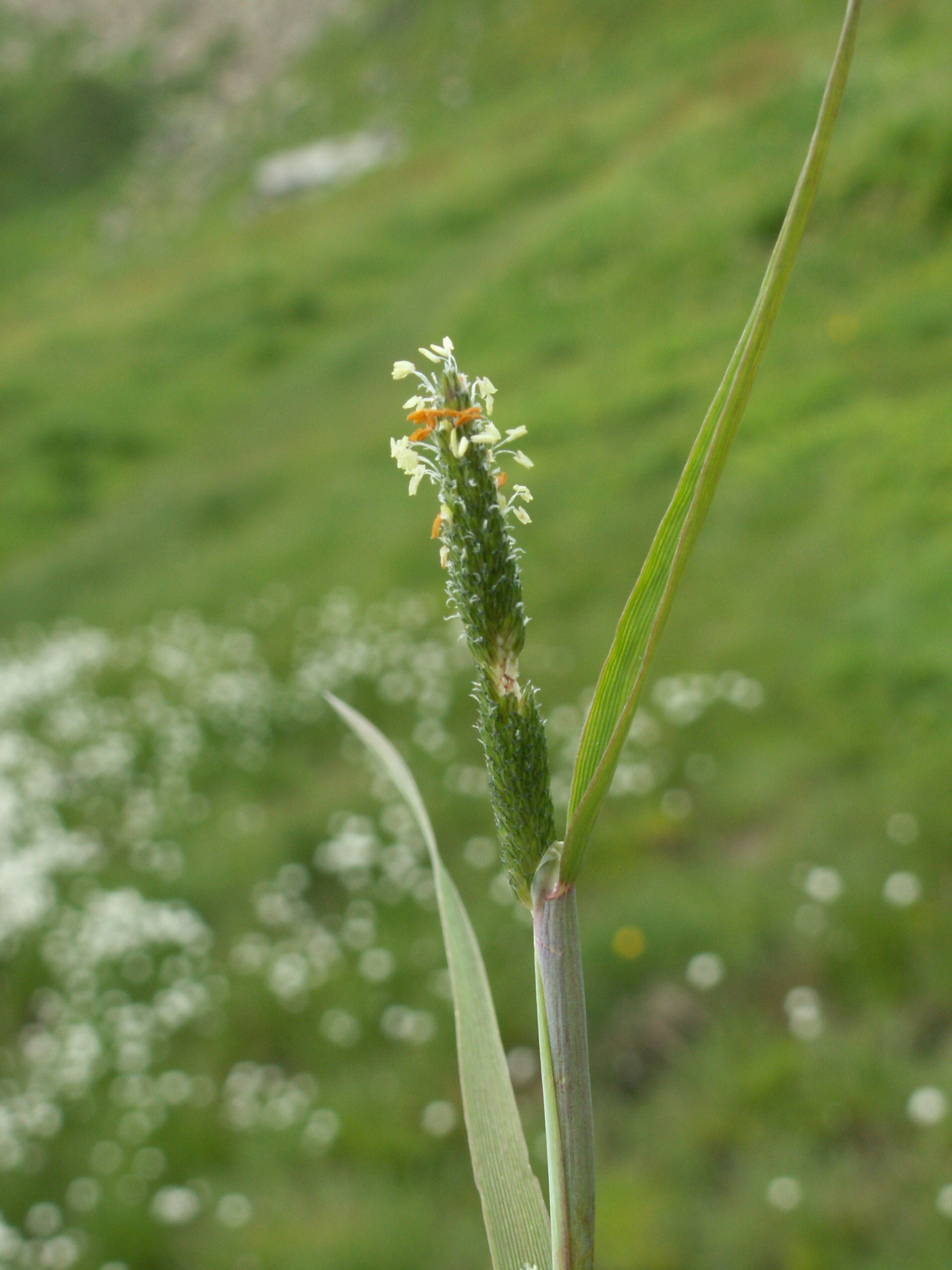

Conservation status
- Least Concern (IUCN 3.1)

- Secure (NatureServe)

Scientific classification
- Kingdom: Plantae
- Clade: Tracheophytes
- Clade: Angiosperms
- Clade: Monocots
- Clade: Commelinids
- Order: Poales
- Family: Poaceae
- Subfamily: Pooideae
- Genus: Alopecurus
- Species: A. aequalis

Binomial name
- Alopecurus aequalis Sobol.

Synonyms
- Alopecurus aequalis subsp. aristulatus (Michx.) Tzvelev; Alopecurus aristulatus Michx.; Alopecurus fulvus Sm.; Alopecurus geniculatus subsp. fulvus (Sm.) Trab.

= Alopecurus aequalis =

Species of flowering plant

Alopecurus aequalis is a common species of grass known as shortawn foxtail or orange foxtail. It is native to much of the temperate Northern Hemisphere from Eurasia to North America. It is most commonly found in areas near fresh water, such as the margins of ponds and ditches.

== Description ==
This perennial bunchgrass is variable in appearance. It produces bunches of erect stems between 20 and about 70 centimeters in height. The leaves are 2–15 cm long; the basal leaves are the longest and the few stem leaves are long-sheathing. The cylindrical inflorescence is a few centimeters long and blooms with white to yellow to bright orange anthers about 0.5-0.8 mm long.

The leaf blades are narrow, about 1–8 mm wide. The flowers are attached to branches, rather than the main axis of the inflorescence.

== Ecology ==
A. aequalis has a C3 metabolism, grows best in full to partial sun, and can tolerate shallow standing water for up to two months during the growing season.

One variety of this species, var. sonomensis, is a rare California endemic grass which is federally listed as an endangered species of the United States.
