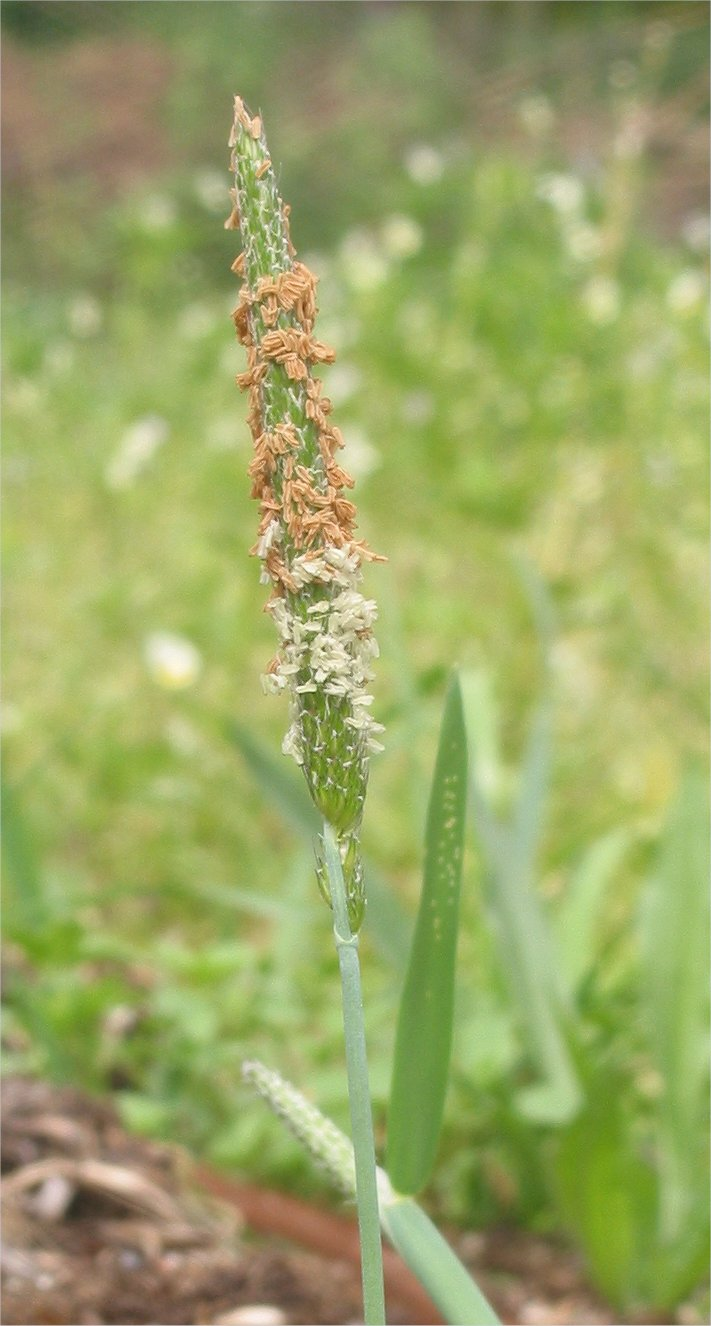

Conservation status
- Least Concern (IUCN 3.1)

Scientific classification
- Kingdom: Plantae
- Clade: Embryophytes
- Clade: Tracheophytes
- Clade: Angiosperms
- Clade: Monocots
- Clade: Commelinids
- Order: Poales
- Family: Poaceae
- Subfamily: Pooideae
- Genus: Alopecurus
- Species: A. geniculatus

Binomial name
- Alopecurus geniculatus L. 1753 not Lindh. ex Scheele 1849 nor Sibth. ex Steudel 1840

Synonyms
- Alopecurus aristulosus Desv.; Alopecurus australis Nees; Alopecurus bulbosus With.; Alopecurus nothus R.Arndt; Alopecurus pallescens Piper; Alopecurus palustris Syme; Tozzettia geniculata (L.) Bubani

= Alopecurus geniculatus =

Species of grass

Alopecurus geniculatus is a species of grass known by the common name water foxtail or marsh foxtail. It is native to much of Eurasia and introduced into North America, South America, and Australia. It grows in moist areas.

Alopecurus geniculatus is a perennial grass forming bunches of erect stems up to about 60 cm (24 in) in height. The leaves are up 12 cm (4.7 in) in length. The pale green to purplish inflorescence is a dense panicle up to 6 or 7 cm (2.4 or 2.8 in) long which blooms in dusty yellow-orange anthers. reproduces sexually by seeds and can reproduce vegetatively by rooting at stem nodes.

In Europe, it can be affected by a fungus, known as 'Foxtail Smut', Urocystis alopecuri.

== Environmental conservation ==
Alopecurus geniculatus is a component of purple moor grass and rush pastures a type of Biodiversity Action Plan habitat in the UK. It occurs on poorly drained neutral and acidic soils of the lowlands and upland fringe.

== Nonindigenous spread ==
The grass has spread significantly in the United States since it was first introduced.

Spread
State	First Observed
AK	1940
AZ	1941
AR	1905
CA	1900
CO	1886
CT	1900
DC	1900
GA	1929
ID	1912
IL	1860
IN	1918
IA	1894
KS	1890
KY	1900
LA	1897
ME	1893
MD	1900
MA	1874
MI	1900
MN	1900
MS	1892
MT	1884
NE	1900
NV	1978
NH	1900
NJ	1915
NM	1904
NY	1858
ND	1915
OH	1882
OK	1896
OR	1884
PA	1900
RI	1941
SD	1900
TN	1999
TX	1899
UT	1894
VT	1921
WA	1902
WV	1900
WI	1900
WY	1888

== Hybrid ==
Alopecurus geniculatus is known to hybridize with other members of the Alopecurus genus. Alopecurus x haussknechtianus is a hybrid between A. geniculatus and A. aequalis, Alopecurus x brachystylus is a hybrid between A. geniculatus and A. pratensis, Alopecurus x plettkei is s hybrid between A. geniculatus and A. bulbosus (Botanical Society of Britain and Ireland 2016).
