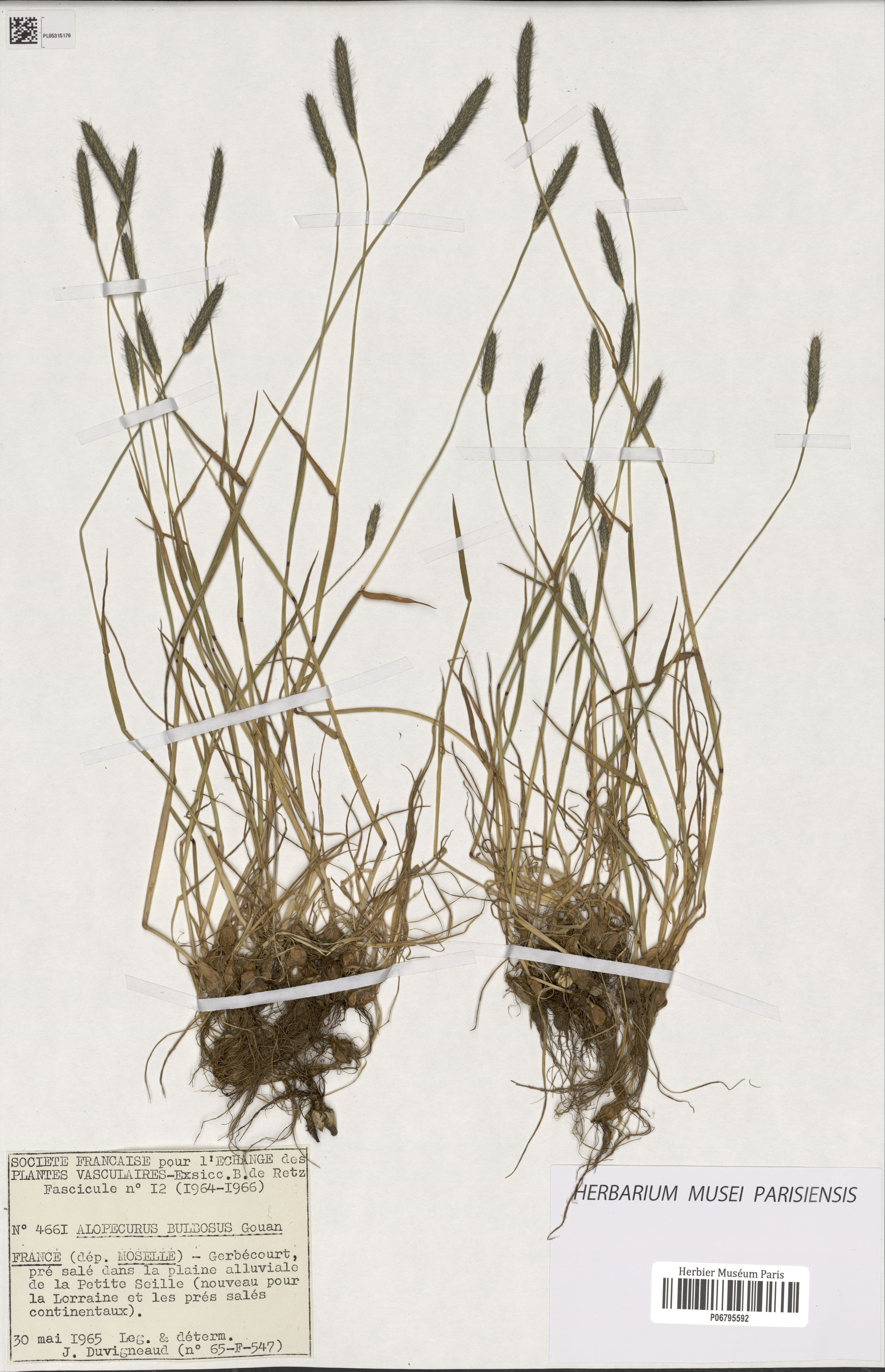

Conservation status
- Least Concern (IUCN 3.1)

Scientific classification
- Kingdom: Plantae
- Clade: Tracheophytes
- Clade: Angiosperms
- Clade: Monocots
- Clade: Commelinids
- Order: Poales
- Family: Poaceae
- Subfamily: Pooideae
- Genus: Alopecurus
- Species: A. bulbosus

Binomial name
- Alopecurus bulbosus Gouan

Synonyms
- Alopecurus bulbosus subsp. macrostachyos (Poir.) Trab.; Alopecurus bulbosus var. macrostachyos (Poir.) Coss. & Durieu; Alopecurus bulbosus var. tenuis Laterr.; Alopecurus macrostachyos Poir.; Alopecurus palustris subsp. bulbosus (Gouan) Syme; Alopecurus salditanus Trab.; Tozzettia nodosa Bubani, nom. superfl.

= Alopecurus bulbosus =

Species of grass

Alopecurus bulbosus, common name bulbous foxtail, is a species of grass. It is a perennial native to the Atlantic coast of Western Europe and the Mediterranean coasts of southern Europe, northwestern Africa, and Turkey. It flowers during spring (April-May).
