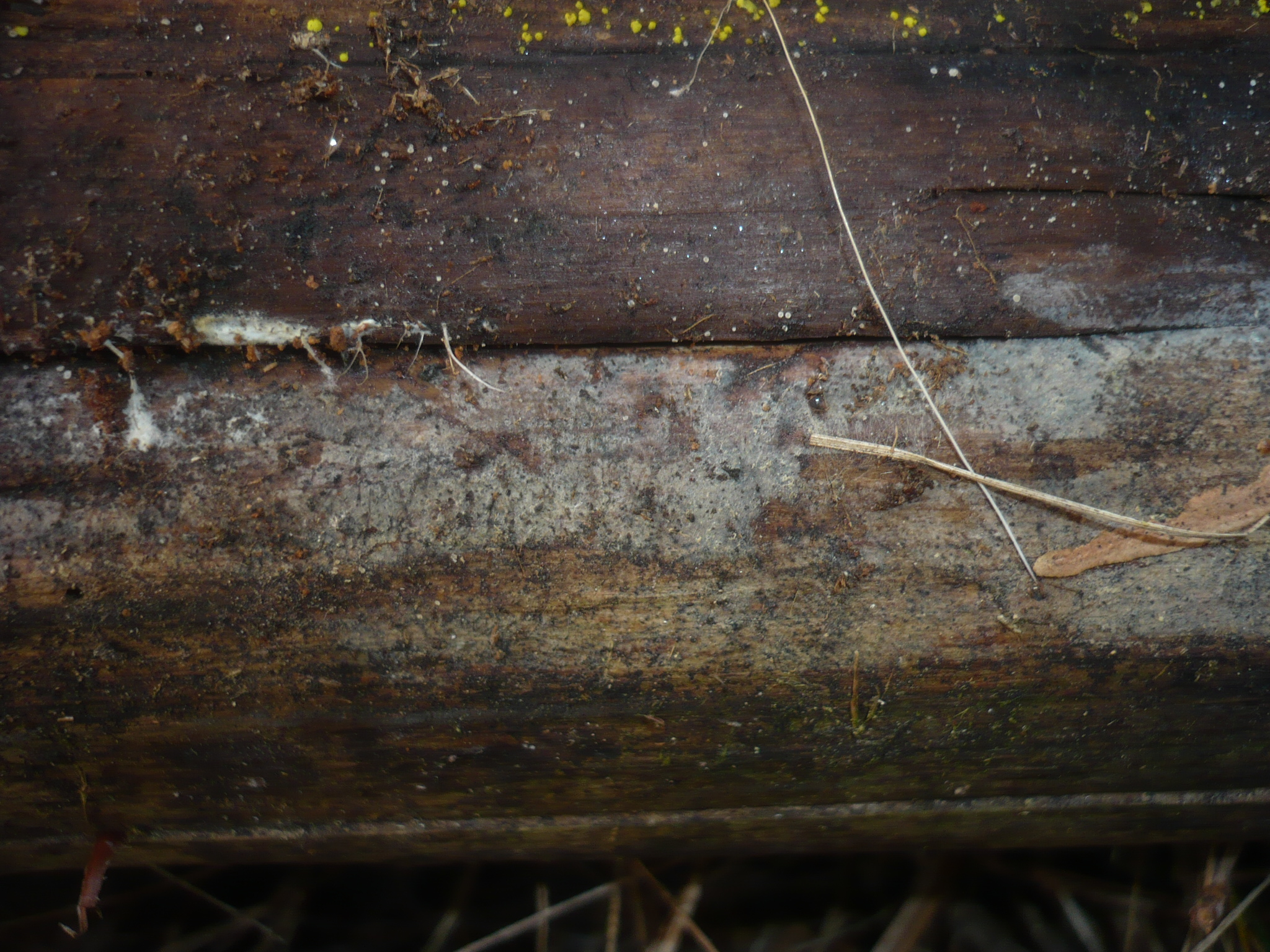

Scientific classification
- Kingdom: Fungi
- Division: Basidiomycota
- Class: Agaricomycetes
- Order: Cantharellales
- Family: Ceratobasidiaceae
- Genus: Ceratobasidium
- Species: C. cornigerum

Binomial name
- Ceratobasidium cornigerum (Bourdot) D.P. Rogers (1935)

Synonyms
- Corticium gramineum Ikata & T. Matsuura (1910) sensu auct. Rhizoctonia goodyerae-repentis Costantin & L.M. Dufour (1920) sensu auct. Corticium cornigerum Bourdot (1922); Corticium pervagum Petch (1925); Corticium invisum Petch (1925); Rhizoctonia endophytica H.K. Saksena & Vaartaja (1960) (invalid name); Rhizoctonia candida W. Yamam. (1962) sensu auct. (invalid name); Rhizoctonia fragariae S.S. Husain & W.E. McKeen (1963) (invalid name); Rhizoctonia cerealis E.P. Hoeven (1977) (invalid name); Ceratobasidium fragariae Kohmoto, N. Maek., Ogihara & S. Nishim. (1981) (invalid name); Ceratobasidium cereale D.I. Murray & Burpee (1984); Ceratobasidium gramineum (Ikata & T. Matsuura) Oniki, Ogoshi & T. Araki (1986) sensu auct. Ceratorhiza goodyerae-repentis (Costantin & L.M. Dufour) R.T. Moore (1987) sensu auct. Ceratorhiza fragariae (S.S. Husain & W.E. McKeen) R.T. Moore (1987) (invalid name); Ceratobasidium lantanae-camarae H.C. Evans, R.W. Barreto & C.A. Ellison (1995)

= Ceratobasidium cornigerum =

Species of fungus

Ceratobasidium cornigerum is a species of fungus in the order Cantharellales. Basidiocarps (fruit bodies) are thin, spread on the substrate out like a film (effused) and web-like. An anamorphic state is frequently obtained when isolates are cultured. Ceratobasidium cornigerum is saprotrophic, but is also a facultative plant pathogen, causing a number of economically important crop diseases, and an orchid endomycorrhizal associate. The species is genetically diverse and is sometimes treated as a complex of closely related taxa. DNA research shows the species (or species complex) actually belongs within the genus Rhizoctonia.

== Taxonomy ==
Corticium cornigerum was first described in 1922 by mycologist Hubert Bourdot, who found it growing in France on dead stems of Jerusalem artichoke. It was subsequently transferred to the genus Ceratobasidium by American mycologist Donald P. Rogers in 1935. Molecular research, based on cladistic analysis of DNA sequences, places Ceratobasidium cornigerum within the genus Rhizoctonia, but this taxonomic problem has yet to be resolved.

=== Anastomosis groups (AGs) ===
Ceratobasidium cornigerum is one of several species whose anamorphic states are sometimes referred to as "binucleate rhizoctonias". These binucleate rhizoctonias have been divided into genetically distinct "anastomosis groups" (AGs) based initially on hyphal anastomosis tests, subsequently supported by analyses of DNA sequences. At least six of these AGs (AG-A, AG-B(o), AG-C, AG-D, AG-P, and AG-Q) have been linked to Ceratobasidium cornigerum, which may therefore be considered as a variable species (comprising at least six genetically distinct populations) or as a complex of morphologically similar species. In the latter case, it is not clear which of these AGs (if any) should take the original name C. cornigerum.

=== Synonyms or associated species ===
The following taxa belong in the Ceratobasidium cornigerum complex and have been treated as synonyms or as closely related but independent species:

- Ceratobasidium ramicola = AG-A (also includes several invalidly published names including Rhizoctonia candida, R. endophytica, and R. fragariae). This group contains a range of crop pathogens and orchid associates.
- Ceratobasidium cereale = AG-D (also includes the dubious name Ceratobasidium gramineum). This group contains cereal and grass pathogens.
- Ceratobasidium ochroleucum (= Corticium stevensii), Ceratobasidium lantanae-camarae, Corticium pervagum, Corticium invisum, and AG-P are all tropical or subtropical, web-blight pathogens.

== Description ==
The basidiocarps (fruit bodies) are effused, thin, and whitish. Microscopically they have colourless hyphae, 3 to 9 μm wide, without clamp connections. The basidia are ellipsoid to broadly club-shaped, 9 to 14 by 8 to 12 μm, bearing four sterigmata. The basidiospores are ellipsoid and broadly fusiform (spindle-shaped), measuring 6 to 11 by 4 to 6 μm. Pale brown sclerotia are sometimes produced, measuring 0.5 to 3 mm across.

== Habitat and distribution ==
If treated as a single species, Ceratobasidium cornigerum is cosmopolitan and has been reported from Asia, Australia, Europe, North & South America. It occurs as a soil saprotroph, producing basidiocarps on dead stems and fallen litter, but is also a facultative plant pathogen causing disease of crops and turf grass. It can also grow as a "web blight" pathogen on living leaves of trees and shrubs, particularly in the tropics and subtropics. It is one of the commonest endomycorrhizal associates of terrestrial orchids.

== Hosts (specifically strawberries) and symptoms ==
Symptoms are most visible in the first fruiting year and are most apparent during the last couple of weeks before harvest. Early symptoms will include reduced vigor and a decrease in the ability to survive high water conditions. Plants may experience lodging when water demand is high. Infected plants may continue to grow but will show aboveground symptoms including stunting, decreased fruit size, and numerous dead older leaves. Belowground symptoms include the deterioration of roots. Infected plants may have feeder and main roots that are smaller and covered in black lesions. Feeder roots will appear water soaked. In the early stages of infection, the core of the root will appear white while the exterior begins to show black lesions. In severely affected roots, both the core and the outer tissue of the root will be black [3]. Stained feeder roots may reveal masses of moniliform cells of R. fragariae. Characteristics of R. fragariae include hyphal branching pattern, dolipore septa, and moniliform resting cells. The binucleated hyphae directly penetrate the root.

== Environment ==
Black root rot is commonly found in field with a long history of strawberry production. Increased chances of disease are likely if there are stress factors such as herbicide injury, winter or cold injury, excessive soil moisture, soil compaction or repeated freezing of roots. Black root rot is not usually introduced into the new planting through nursery stock or contaminated equipment but is instead often due to one or more of the disease-causing fungi already present in the soil. Black root rot is a disease complex on strawberry, which means that one or more organisms can infect the host. For strawberries, the common fungi are Pythium spp, Fusarium spp, and Rhizoctonia spp, along with several species of nematodes that function together to cause disease. Strawberries have been shown to have greater levels of rot when simultaneously exposed to both R. fragariae and P. penetrans (nematode).

== Importance ==
Black root rot is a common disease in North Carolina, a top strawberry producing region, and much of the southeastern region of the United States, having been shown to reduce yields by 20 to 40%. This is the main reason growers fumigate their fields in this region. Pre-planting fumigation may suppress the disease during the year of planting, but typically it does not offer any lasting control and cultivars resistant to black root rot are not currently available. Black root rot has been a challenge for strawberry growers for at least a century, and probably longer. Black root rot of strawberry is recorded to have been prevalent in Massachusetts, Michigan, and New York in the years 1902 and 1908. In 1920 a Rhizoctonia species was first assigned as the causal pathogen responsible for "dying out" of strawberry beds in western Washington. By 1988, R. fragariae was isolated from more than 70% of plants from commercial strawberry fields in Connecticut in cultivation for more than one year.

== Economic importance ==
Under various names, fungi in the Ceratobasidium cornigerum complex are known to cause a range of diseases in commercial crops.

The AG-A group (Ceratobasidium ramicola) causes various diseases, including "strawberry black root rot", diseases of soya bean, pea, and pak choy, and "silky threadblight" of Pittosporum and other shrubs.

The AG-D group (Ceratobasidium cereale) causes "sharp eyespot" of cereals and "yellow patch" in turf grass.

Corticium invisum was described as the causal agent of "black rot" of tea in Sri Lanka, whilst Corticium pervagum causes a leaf and stem blight of cocoa. Ceratobasidium ochroleucum (Corticium stevensii) was described causing a blight of apple and quince trees in Brazil, but the name is of uncertain application because of confusion with Rhizoctonia noxia.

Ceratobasidium lantanae-camarae was described from Brazil as the causal agent of a web blight of the invasive shrub Lantana camara, suggesting it has potential as a biocontrol agent.
