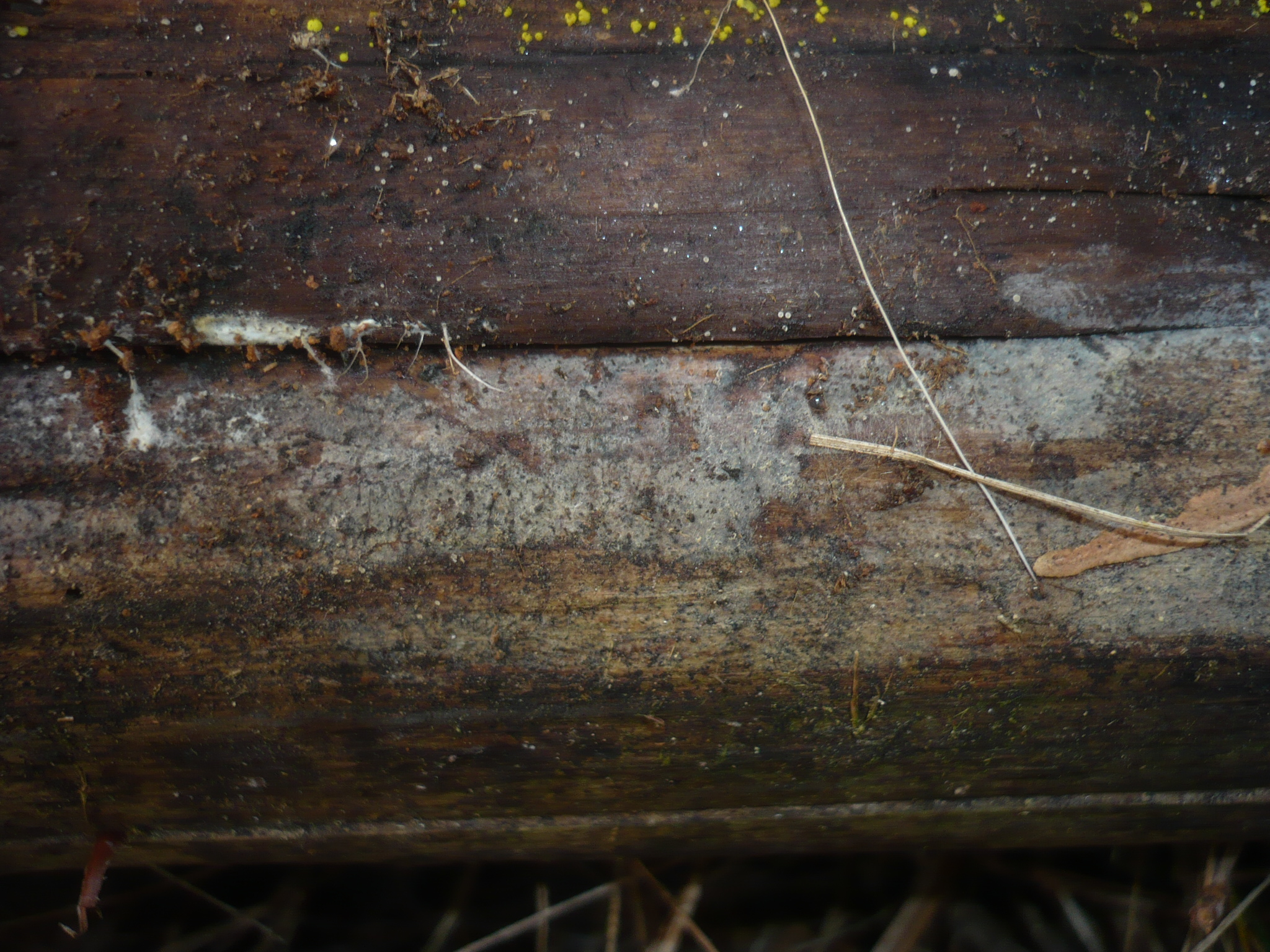
- Ceratobasidium cornigerum

Scientific classification
- Kingdom: Fungi
- Division: Basidiomycota
- Class: Agaricomycetes
- Order: Cantharellales
- Family: Ceratobasidiaceae
- Genus: Ceratobasidium; D.P. Rogers

Type species
- Ceratobasidium calosporum D.P. Rogers

Synonyms
- Rhizoctonia DC.

= Ceratobasidium =

Genus of fungi

Ceratobasidium is a genus of fungi in the order Cantharellales. Basidiocarps (fruit bodies) are effused and the genus is sometimes grouped among the corticioid fungi, though species also retain features of the heterobasidiomycetes. Ceratobasidium species, excluding the type, are also now considered synonymous with Rhizoctonia, following the transfer of all published names as of 2025 to Rhizoctonia. Species are saprotrophic, but several are also facultative plant pathogens, causing a number of commercially important crop diseases. Some are also endomycorrhizal associates of orchids.

== Taxonomy ==
The name Ceratobasidium was introduced in 1935 by American mycologist D.P. Rogers to accommodate species of the old form genus Corticium that showed affinities with the heterobasidiomycetes. These affinities were the possession of large sterigmata ("cerato basidium" means "horned basidium") and the production of basidiospores that produce secondary spores. Four species were originally placed in the genus, with subsequent authors adding a further 35 species. The genus Ceratorhiza was introduced for anamorphs of Ceratobasidium by R.T. Moore in 1987, distinguishing them from anamorphs of Thanatephorus which were retained in Rhizoctonia.

=== Current status ===
Molecular phylogenetic analysis of DNA sequences, places Ceratobasidium (excluding the type species) within the Cantharellales. Research on the septal pore ultrastructure of the little-known and atypical type species, Ceratobasidium calosporum, indicates that it is a member of the Auriculariales and is unrelated to other species of Ceratobasidium. On this basis, Oberwinkler et al. (2013) concluded that the name Ceratobasidium should only be applied to the type–C. calosporum—and that this taxon was more appropriately placed in the Sebacinaceae based on shared characters between C. calosporum and Sebacina calospora (syn. Ceratosebacina calospora).

Following changes to the International Code of Nomenclature for algae, fungi, and plants, the practice of giving different names to teleomorph and anamorph forms of the same fungus was discontinued, meaning that Ceratorhiza became a synonym of the earlier name Ceratobasidium. DNA evidence also placed Ceratobasidium species (excluding the type species) in the genus Rhizoctonia.

As of 2025, Ceratobasidium and several other genera were formally synonymised under a unified Rhizoctonia. The genus Rhizoctonia now encompasses names formerly circumscribed under Moniliopsis, Ceratobasidium, Thanatephorus, Uthatobasidium, Koleroga, Cejpomyces, Oncobasidium, Ypsilonidium, Ceratorhiza, and Tofispora.

=== Species now placed within Rhizoctonia ===
Following the generic revision completed by O'Donnell et al. (2025), the following names are now placed within Rhizoctonia:

- Ceratobasidium albasitensis = Rhizoctonia klebahnii
- Ceratobasidium anceps = Rhizoctonia anceps
- Ceratobasidium angustisporum = Rhizoctonia angustispora
- Ceratobasidium australiense (as 'australiensis') = Rhizoctonia australiensis
- Ceratobasidium bicorne = Rhizoctonia bicornis
- Ceratobasidium bulbillifaciens = Rhizoctonia bulbillifaciens
- Ceratobasidium chavesianum (as 'chavesanum') = Rhizoctonia chavesiana
- Ceratobasidium cornigerum = Rhizoctonia cornigera
- Ceratobasidium erinnae = Rhizoctonia erinnae
- Ceratobasidium globisporum = Rhizoctonia globispora
- Ceratobasidium gomesae = Rhizoctonia gomesae
- Ceratobasidium korinnae = Rhizoctonia korinnae
- Ceratobasidium lantanae-camarae = Rhizoctonia lantanae-camarae
- Ceratobasidium myrtisiae = Rhizoctonia myrtisiae
- Ceratobasidium niltonsouzanum = Rhizoctonia niltonsouzana
- Ceratobasidium noxium = Rhizoctonia noxia
- Ceratobasidium obscurum = Rhizoctonia obscura
- Ceratobasidium papillatum = Rhizoctonia papillata
- 'Ceratobasidium praticola' nom. inval. = Rhizoctonia praticola
- Ceratobasidium praxillae = Rhizoctonia praxillae
- Ceratobasidium pseudocornigerum = Rhizoctonia pseudocornigera
- Ceratobasidium queenslandicum = Rhizoctonia queenslandica
- Ceratobasidium ramicola = Rhizoctonia ramicola
- Ceratobasidium sapphoae = Rhizoctonia sapphoae
- Ceratobasidium setariae = Rhizoctonia setariae
- Ceratobasidium solani = Rhizoctonia solani
- Ceratobasidium sphaerosporum = Rhizoctonia sphaerospora
- Ceratobasidium sterigmaticum = Rhizoctonia sterigmatica
- Ceratobasidium stridii = Rhizoctonia stridii
- Ceratobasidium terrigenum = Rhizoctonia terrigena
- Ceratobasidium theobromae = Rhizoctonia theobromae
- Ceratobasidium tradescantiae = Rhizoctonia tradescantiae

=== Redisposition of former species ===
Names previously placed within Ceratobasidium that are now placed in other genera are listed below. Refer to O'Donnell et al. (2025) for a summary of 66 invalid/illegitimate names and 34 names of uncertain application (nomina dubia), some of which are names under Ceratobasidium.

- Ceratobasidium atratum = Scotomyces subviolaceus (Hydnaceae)
- Ceratobasidium fibrillosum = Oliveonia fibrillosa (Oliveoniaceae)
- Ceratobasidium mycophagum = Syzygospora mycophaga (Filobasidiaceae)
- Ceratobasidium pearsonii = Paullicorticium pearsonii (Hydnaceae)
- Ceratobasidium plumbeum = Scotomyces subviolaceus (Hydnaceae)
- Ceratobasidium striisporum = Xenasma pulverulentum (Xenasmataceae)
- Ceratobasidium subatratum = Scotomyces subviolaceus (Hydnaceae)
- Ceratobasidium vagum = Botryobasidium vagum (Botryobasidiaceae)

== Description ==
Fruit bodies are effused, thin and often inconspicuous, smooth, waxy to dry and web-like, whitish to pale grey. Microscopically they have comparatively wide hyphae without clamp connections and basidia that are spherical to cuboid or broadly club-shaped. Basidia bear 2 to 4 sterigmata, which are comparatively large. Basidiospores are globose to cylindrical (elongated and worm-like in the type species), smooth, and colourless. They frequently produce secondary spores and germinate by hyphal tubes. Asexual anamorphs produce hyphae (sometimes swollen) and occasionally sclerotia (small propagules composed of thick-walled hyphae).

== Habitat and distribution ==
Species are mainly saprotrophic, occurring in the soil and producing fruit bodies on dead stems and plant detritus. Some occur on attached leaves and stems. Several species have been isolated from orchid mycorrhiza. Distribution appears to be cosmopolitan.

== Economic importance ==
Ceratobasidium species are opportunistic parasites of plants, causing a variety of economically important diseases. Examples include: Ceratobasidium cereale, the cause of sharp eyespot of cereals and Ceratobasidium oryzae-sativae, the cause of aggregate sheath spot of rice.
