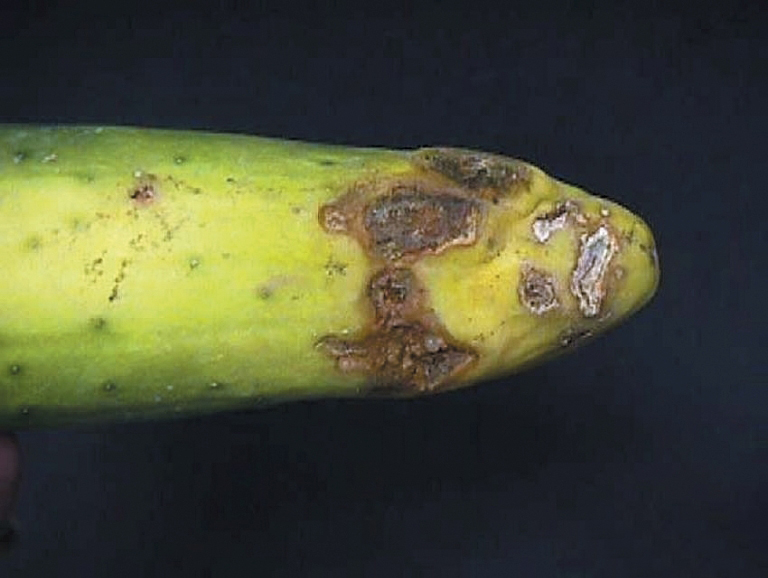
- Disease of cucumber caused by Rhizoctonia solani

Scientific classification
- Kingdom: Fungi
- Division: Basidiomycota
- Class: Agaricomycetes
- Order: Cantharellales
- Family: Ceratobasidiaceae
- Genus: Rhizoctonia; DC. (1815)

Type species
- Rhizoctonia solani J.G. Kühn (1858)

Species
- Rhizoctonia amygdalispora; Rhizoctonia anceps; Rhizoctonia angustispora; Rhizoctonia anomala; Rhizoctonia australiensis; Rhizoctonia biapiculata; Rhizoctonia bicornis; Rhizoctonia brevispora; Rhizoctonia bulbillifaciens; Rhizoctonia butinii; Rhizoctonia chavesiana; Rhizoctonia cornigera; Rhizoctonia erinnae; Rhizoctonia floccosa; Rhizoctonia fumigata; Rhizoctonia fusispora; Rhizoctonia gardneri; Rhizoctonia globispora; Rhizoctonia gomesae; Rhizoctonia hebelomatospora; Rhizoctonia hydrophila; Rhizoctonia klebahnii; Rhizoctonia korinnae; Rhizoctonia lantanae-camarae; Rhizoctonia microsclerotia; Rhizoctonia myrtisiae; Rhizoctonia niltonsouzana; Rhizoctonia noxia; Rhizoctonia obscura; Rhizoctonia ochracea; Rhizoctonia papillata; Rhizoctonia pennata; Rhizoctonia pernacatena; Rhizoctonia praticola; Rhizoctonia praxillae; Rhizoctonia pseudocornigera; Rhizoctonia queenslandica; Rhizoctonia ramicola; Rhizoctonia repetospora; Rhizoctonia rhizodes; Rhizoctonia robertsii; Rhizoctonia sapphoae; Rhizoctonia sasakii; Rhizoctonia scaberula; Rhizoctonia setariae; Rhizoctonia solani; Rhizoctonia sphaerospora; Rhizoctonia sterigmatica; Rhizoctonia stridii; Rhizoctonia terrigena; Rhizoctonia theobromae; Rhizoctonia tradescantiae

Synonyms
- Moniliopsis Ruhland (1908); Ceratobasidium D.P. Rogers (1935); Thanatephorus Donk (1956); Uthatobasidium Donk (1956); Koleroga Donk (1958); Cejpomyces Svrček & Pouzar (1970); Oncobasidium Talbot & Keane (1971); Ypsilonidium Donk (1972); Aquathanatephorus Tu & Kimbrough (1978); Ceratorhiza R.T. Moore (1987) Tofispora G. Langer (1994)

= Rhizoctonia =

Genus of fungi

Rhizoctonia is a genus of fungi in the family Ceratobasidiaceae. Species form thin, effused, corticioid basidiocarps (fruit bodies), but are most frequently found in their sterile, anamorph state. Rhizoctonia species are saprotrophic, but some are also facultative plant pathogens, causing commercially important crop diseases. Some are also endomycorrhizal associates of orchids. The genus name was formerly used to accommodate many superficially similar, but unrelated fungi. As of 2025, the synonymisation of several genera under a unified Rhizoctonia was formalised, and the genus now includes names formerly circumscribed under Moniliopsis, Ceratobasidium, Thanatephorus, Uthatobasidium, Koleroga, Cejpomyces, Oncobasidium, Ypsilonidium, Ceratorhiza, and Tofispora. As currently circumscribed, the genus contains 52 accepted species.

== Taxonomy ==
=== History ===
==== Anamorphs ====
Rhizoctonia was introduced in 1815 by French mycologist Augustin Pyramus de Candolle for anamorphic plant pathogenic fungi that produce both hyphae and sclerotia. The name is derived from Ancient Greek, ῥίζα (rhiza, "root") + κτόνος (ktonos, "murder"), and de Candolle's original species, Rhizoctonia crocorum (teleomorph Helicobasidium purpureum), is the causal agent of violet root rot of carrots and other root vegetables. Subsequent authors added over 100 additional names to the genus, most of them plant pathogens bearing only a superficial resemblance to the type species. Rhizoctonia thus became an artificial form genus of anamorphic fungi comprising a diverse range of unrelated species.

As part of a move towards a more natural classification of fungi, American mycologist Royall T. Moore proposed in 1987 that Rhizoctonia should be restricted to the type species and its relatives, with unrelated species moved to other genera. Unfortunately, this meant that the best-known but unrelated species, Rhizoctonia solani, would have undergone a name change to Moniliopsis solani. To avoid this, it was subsequently proposed that R. solani should replace R. crocorum as the type species of Rhizoctonia. This proposal was passed and the type of Rhizoctonia is now conserved as R. solani under the International Code of Nomenclature for algae, fungi, and plants.

R.T. Moore retained species having teleomorphs in the genus Thanatephorus within Rhizoctonia, but moved those with teleomorphs in the genus Ceratobasidium to the new anamorphic genus Ceratorhiza.

==== Teleomorphs ====
In 1956, Dutch mycologist M.A. Donk published the new teleomorphic genera Thanatephorus and Uthatobasidium simultaneously, reserving the former for plant-pathogenic species producing sclerotia-bearing Rhizoctonia anamorphs (with T. cucumeris as the type) and the latter for saprotrophic species not producing anamorphs (with U. fusisporum as the type). In 1996, on the basis of their similar morphology, the two genera were considered to be synonymous by K. Hauerslev and P. Roberts. in 1970 Svrček & Pouzar introduced the genus Cejpomyces for a species resembling Thanatephorus, but having septate basidiospores. Based on their similar morphology, the genera were considered synonymous by Langer (1994). In 1971 Talbot & Keane introduced the genus Oncobasidium for a plant pathogenic species resembling Thanatephorus but lacking sclerotia and in 1972 M.A. Donk introduced the genus Ypsilondium for a species resembling Uthatobasidium but having bisterigmate (two-spored) basidia. Both genera were considered synonyms of Thanatephorus by Roberts (1999). In 1978 Tu & Kimbrough introduced the genus Aquathanatephorus for an isolate from water hyacinth which produced a teleomorph with swollen, inwardly curving sterigmata. This was redetermined as Thanatephorus cucumeris by Andersen (1996).

Ceratobasidium was introduced in 1935 by American mycologist D.P. Rogers to accommodate species of the old form genus Corticium that showed affinities with the heterobasidiomycetes. These affinities were the possession of large sterigmata ("cerato-basidium" means "horned basidium") and the production of basidiospores that produce secondary spores. The genus Koleroga was proposed by Donk (1958) to accommodate K. noxia, a plant pathogen morphologically similar to Ceratobasidium but not known to produce secondary spores. Talbot (1965) demonstrated that such spores were present in some collections and suggested that Koleroga be synonymized with Ceratobasidium.

=== Current status ===
Molecular research, based on cladistic analysis of DNA sequences, places Rhizoctonia within the family Ceratobasidiaceae. The genus is only monophyletic, however, if species of Ceratobasidium (excluding the type) and Ceratorhiza are included as synonyms, since there is no apparent distinction between these species and species of Rhizoctonia. DNA sequencing has also confirmed the synonymy of Uthatobasidium, Oncobasidium, and Koleroga.

Following changes to the International Code of Nomenclature for algae, fungi, and plants, the practice of giving different names to teleomorph and anamorph forms of the same fungus was discontinued, meaning that Thanatephorus became a synonym of the earlier name Rhizoctonia. The problematic application of various anamorph/teleomorph names within Ceratobasidiaceae was rectified in 2025 with the recognition of a unified Rhizoctonia, formalised by the transfer of 32 names from Moniliopsis, Ceratobasidium, Thanatephorus, Uthatobasidium, Koleroga, Cejpomyces, Oncobasidium, Ypsilonidium, Ceratorhiza, and Tofispora.

=== Redisposition of former species ===
The most recent comprehensive review of names in Rhizoctonia and allied genera was completed in 2025 by O'Donnell et al. Names previously placed within Rhizoctonia or its generic synonyms that are now placed in other genera are listed below. Refer to O'Donnell et al. (2025) for a summary of 66 invalid/illegitimate names and 34 names of uncertain application (nomina dubia).

- Cejpomyces globosisporus = Botryobasidium globisporum (Botryobasidiaceae)
- Ceratobasidium atratum = Scotomyces subviolaceus (Hydnaceae)
- Ceratobasidium fibrillosum = Oliveonia fibrillosa (Oliveoniaceae)
- Ceratobasidium mycophagum = Syzygospora mycophaga (Filobasidiaceae)
- Ceratobasidium pearsonii = Paullicorticium pearsonii (Hydnaceae)
- Ceratobasidium plumbeum = Scotomyces subviolaceus (Hydnaceae)
- Ceratobasidium striisporum = Xenasma pulverulentum (Xenasmataceae)
- Ceratobasidium subatratum = Scotomyces subviolaceus (Hydnaceae)
- Ceratobasidium vagum = Botryobasidium vagum (Botryobasidiaceae)
- Rhizoctonia allii = Helicobasidium purpureum (Helicobasidiaceae)
- Rhizoctonia anaticula = Tulasnella anaticula (Tulasnellaceae)
- Rhizoctonia asparagi = Helicobasidium purpureum (Helicobasidiaceae)
- Rhizoctonia bataticola = Macrophomina phaseolina (Botryosphaeriaceae)
- Rhizoctonia carotae = Athelia arachnoidea (Atheliaceae)
- Rhizoctonia centrifuga = Athelia epiphylla (Atheliaceae)
- Rhizoctonia crocorum = Helicobasidium purpureum (Helicobasidiaceae)
- Rhizoctonia lamellifera = Macrophomina phaseolina (Botryosphaeriaceae)
- Rhizoctonia leguminicola = Slafractonia leguminicola (Incertae sedis;Ascomycota)
- Rhizoctonia medicaginis = Helicobasidium purpureum (Helicobasidiaceae)
- Rhizoctonia menthae = Puccinia menthae (Pucciniaceae)
- Rhizoctonia orobanches = Urocystis orobanches (Urocystidaceae)
- Rhizoctonia quercina = Rosellinia quercina (Xylariaceae)
- Rhizoctonia repens = Tulasnella deliquescens (Tulasnellaceae)
- Rhizoctonia rubiae = Helicobasidium purpureum (Helicobasidiaceae)
- Rhizoctonia solani f. paroketea = Agroathelia rolfsii (Amylocorticiaceae)
- Rhizoctonia tabifica = Colletotrichum coccodes (Glomerellaceae)
- Rhizoctonia zeae = Waitea zeae (Corticiaceae)
- Uthatobasidium citriforme = Sistotrema citriforme (Hydnaceae)

== Habitat and distribution ==
Species are saprotrophic, often occurring in soil and producing basidiocarps (fruit bodies) on dead stems and plant detritus. They are also opportunistic plant pathogens, with an almost unlimited host range, and have been isolated from orchid mycorrhiza. Distribution appears to be cosmopolitan.

== Economic importance ==
Rhizoctonia solani causes a wide range of commercially significant plant diseases. It is one of the fungi responsible for Brown patch (a turfgrass disease), damping off in seedlings, as well as black scurf of potatoes, bare patch of cereals, root rot of sugar beet, belly rot of cucumber, sheath blight of rice, and many other pathogenic conditions. Rhizoctonia oryzae-sativae causes 'aggregate sheath spot' and 'sclerotium' disease of rice. The subtropical Rhizoctonia noxia causes 'black rot' of coffee and other foliar blights, whilst Rhizoctonia theobromae causes 'vascular-streak dieback' of Theobroma cacao (cocoa tree). In Europe, Rhizoctonia butinii causes web blight of spruce.

An efficient conversion of tryptophan to indole-3-acetic acid (IAA) and/or tryptophol can be achieved by some species in the genus Rhizoctonia.
