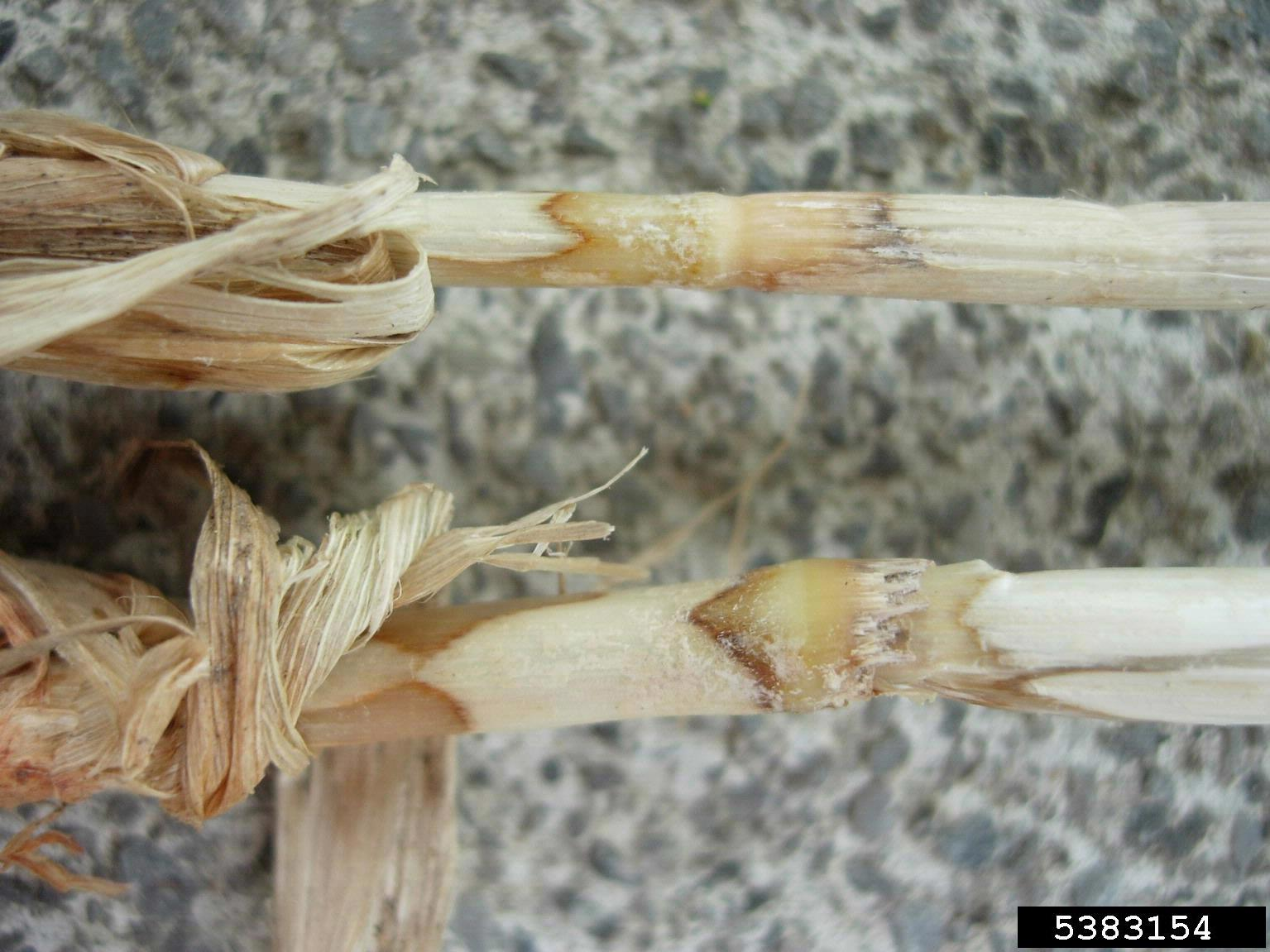
- C. cereale Lesions on culm of Avena sativa

Scientific classification
- Domain: Eukaryota
- Kingdom: Fungi
- Division: Basidiomycota
- Class: Agaricomycetes
- Order: Cantharellales
- Family: Ceratobasidiaceae
- Genus: Ceratobasidium
- Species: C. cereale

Binomial name
- Ceratobasidium cereale D.I.Murray & Burpee, (1984)

Synonyms
- Ceratorhiza cerealis (E.P.Hoeven) R.T.Moore, (1987); Rhizoctonia cerealis E.P.Hoeven, (1977)

= Ceratobasidium cereale =

Species of fungus

Ceratobasidium cereale is a plant pathogen.
