= Ceratobasidium ochroleucum =

Scientific classification
- Kingdom: Fungi
- Division: Basidiomycota
- Class: Agaricomycetes
- Order: Cantharellales
- Family: Ceratobasidiaceae
- Genus: Ceratobasidium
- Species: C. ochroleucum

Binomial name
- Ceratobasidium ochroleucum (F. Noack) Ginns & M.N.L. Lefebvre (1993)

Synonyms
- Hypochnopsis ochroleuca F. Noack (1898); Hypochnus ochroleucus (F. Noack) F. Noack (1902); Corticium ochroleucum (F. Noack) Burt (1915) (nom. illegit.); Corticium stevensii Burt (1918); Ceratobasidium stevensii (Burt) Venkatar (1973) (nom. inval.)

Species of fungus

Ceratobasidium ochroleucum is a species of fungus in the family Ceratobasidiaceae. Basidiocarps are effused and web-like and were originally described from Brazil, causing a thread blight of apple and quince trees. The fungus was subsequently reported as a leaf disease on orchard crops in North America, but since descriptions of Ceratobasidium orchroleucum vary considerably and no type specimen exists, its identity remains unclear. Roberts (1999) considered it a "nomen dubium".

== Taxonomy ==
The species was originally described from Brazil in 1898 as Hypochnopsis ochroleuca. American mycologist E.A. Burt subsequently transferred it to Corticium, then used as a catch-all genus for effused corticioid fungi, but the combination in Corticium was illegitimate since Elias Magnus Fries had already described a different Corticium ochroleucum in 1838. Burt accordingly gave the Brazilian species the new name Corticium stevensii. The species was transferred to Ceratobasidium in 1973, but the combination was invalid and should have been based on Noack's original epithet, a mistake eventually corrected in 1993.
