= Ceratobasidium setariae =

Scientific classification
- Kingdom: Fungi
- Division: Basidiomycota
- Class: Agaricomycetes
- Order: Cantharellales
- Family: Ceratobasidiaceae
- Genus: Ceratobasidium
- Species: C. setariae

Binomial name
- Ceratobasidium setariae (Sawada) Oniki, Ogoshi & T. Araki, (1986)

Synonyms
- Ceratobasidium oryzae-sativae P.S. Gunnell & R.K. Webster, (1987); Ceratobasidium setariae (Sawada) P.S. Gunnell & R.K. Webster, (1987); Hypochnus setariae Sawada, (1912)

Species of fungus

Ceratobasidium setariae is a fungal plant pathogen that can cause aggregate sheath spot in rice.
