= Rhizoctonia noxia =

Scientific classification
- Domain: Eukaryota
- Kingdom: Fungi
- Division: Basidiomycota
- Class: Agaricomycetes
- Order: Cantharellales
- Family: Ceratobasidiaceae
- Genus: Rhizoctonia
- Species: R. noxia

Binomial name
- Rhizoctonia noxia (Donk) Oberw., R. Bauer, Garnica & R. Kirschner (2013)

Synonyms
- Ceratobasidium noxium (Donk) P. Roberts (1999); Koleroga noxia Donk (1958); Pellicularia koleroga Cooke (1876) sensu auct. Corticium koleroga (Cooke) Höhn. (1910) sensu auct. Botryobasidium koleroga (Cooke) Venkatar (1949) sensu auct.

Species of fungus

Rhizoctonia noxia is a species of fungus in the order Cantharellales. Basidiocarps (fruit bodies) are thin, effused, and web-like. The species is tropical to sub-tropical and is mainly known as a plant pathogen, the causative agent of "kole-roga" or black rot of coffee and various blights of citrus and other trees.

== Taxonomy ==
The fungus responsible for kole-roga of coffee was sent from India to Mordecai Cubitt Cooke at the Royal Botanic Gardens, Kew who named it Pellicularia koleroga in 1876. Cooke, however, described only hyphae and some small warted spores, later presumed to be from a contaminating mould. As a result Donk, when reviewing Pellicularia in 1954, dismissed both the genus and P. koleroga as "nomina confusa", later (1958) substituting the new name Koleroga noxia for the species. Based on a re-examination of specimens, Roberts (1999) considered Koleroga to be a synonym of Ceratobasidium. Molecular research, based on cladistic analysis of DNA sequences, has, however, now placed Ceratobasidium species (excepting the type) in synonymy with Rhizoctonia.

Koleroga means "rot disease" in the Kannada language of Karnataka.

== Description ==
Fruit bodies are effused, thin, and whitish. Microscopically they have colourless hyphae, 3 to 8 μm wide, without clamp connections. The basidia are ellipsoid to broadly club-shaped, 10 to 12 by 7 to 8 μm, bearing four sterigmata. The basidiospores are narrow and fusiform, 9 to 13 x 3 to 5 μm.

== Habitat and distribution ==
Rhizoctonia noxia has only been collected as a plant pathogen on living stems and leaves of commercial crops (including coffee, citrus, and persimmon) on which it causes a web blight. It has been reported from Asia (including India and Vietnam) and from the Americas (including Colombia, Guatemala, Jamaica, Puerto Rico, Trinidad, United States, and Venezuela).
