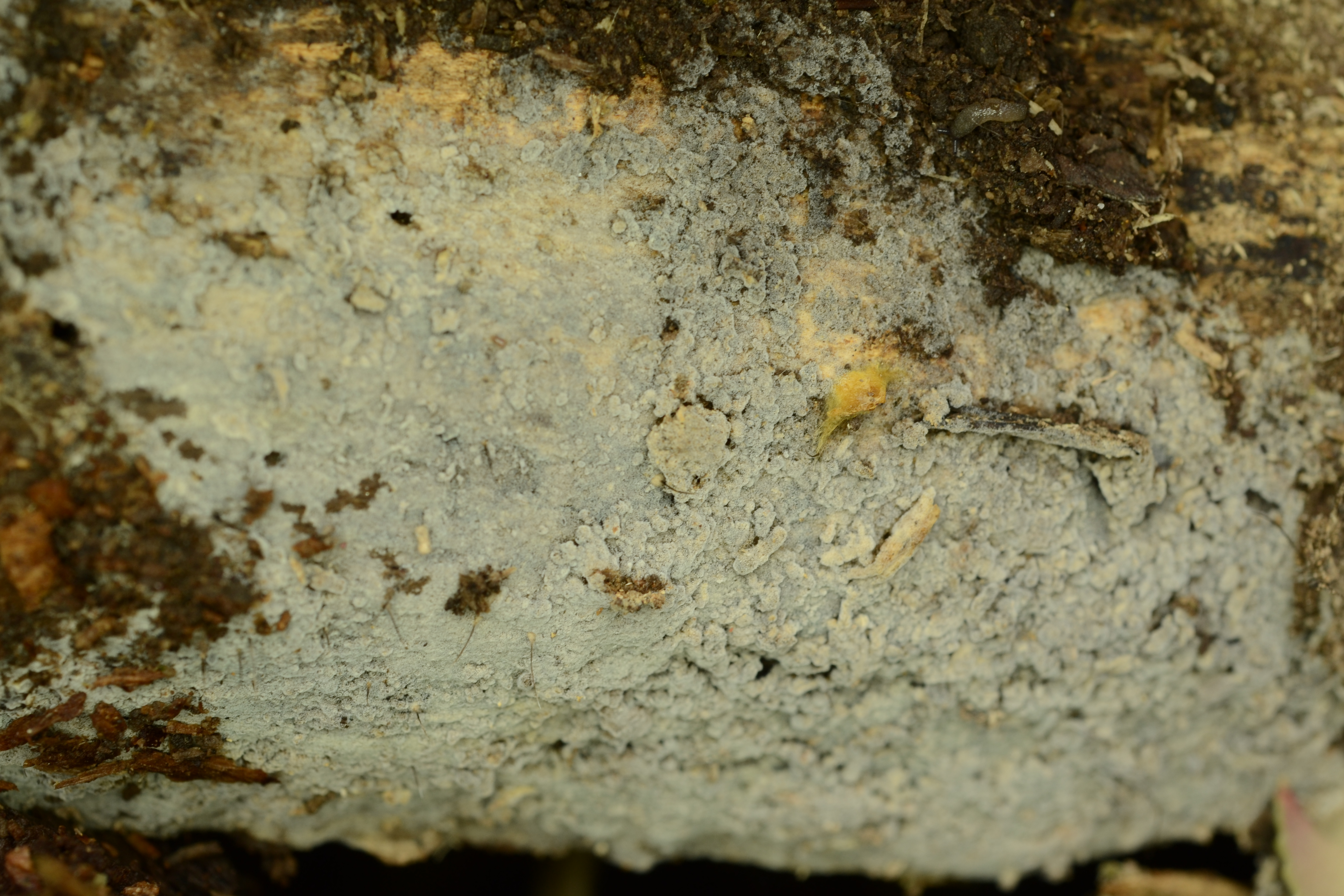
- Botryobasidium candicans

Scientific classification
- Kingdom: Fungi
- Division: Basidiomycota
- Class: Agaricomycetes
- Order: Cantharellales
- Family: Botryobasidiaceae
- Genus: Botryobasidium; Donk (1931)

Type species
- Botryobasidium subcoronatum (Höhn. & Litsch.) Donk 1931

Synonyms
- Acladium Link (1809); Alysidium Kunze (1817); Haplotrichum Link (1824); Sporocephalium Chevall. (1826); Physospora Fr. (1835); Allescheriella Henn. (1897); Botryohypochnus Donk (1931); Neoacladium P.N. Singh & S.K. Singh (2019)

= Botryobasidium =

Genus of fungi

Botryobasidium is a genus of corticioid fungi belonging to the order Cantharellales. Basidiocarps (fruit bodies) are ephemeral and typically form thin, web-like, white to cream, effused patches on the underside of fallen branches, logs, and leaf litter. Several species form anamorphs producing chlamydospores. All species are wood- or litter-rotting saprotrophs and the genus has a worldwide distribution.

== Taxonomy ==
The genus was first described by Dutch mycologist M.A. Donk in 1931. Species had previously been referred to the genus Corticium, formerly used for most corticioid fungi with effused fruit bodies. Donk recognized a group of species within Corticium that (microscopically) produced basidia in "botryose" clusters (hence Botryobasidium), had wide, often right-angled hyphae, large two- to eight-spored basidia, and smooth basidiospores. He described a second genus, Botryohypochnus, for species with ornamented basidiospores. The genus was later monographed by Langer (1994) who included Botryohypochnus within the generic concept of Botryobasidium.

Asexual anamorphic forms, producing chlamydospores but not basidia and basidiospores, had been treated separately and given a variety of generic names. These were reviewed by Holubová-Jechková (1980) who considered most of these genera synonymous with Haplotrichum, the anamorphic state of Botryobasidium.

=== Current status ===
Following changes to the International Code of Nomenclature for algae, fungi, and plants, the practice of giving different names to teleomorph and anamorph forms of the same fungus has been discontinued, meaning that Haplotrichum and other anamorph genera have become synonyms of Botryobasidium. Molecular research, based on cladistic analysis of DNA sequences, indicates that the genus (including Botryohypochnus) is monophyletic and forms a natural group within the Cantharellales.
