= Heterobasidiomycetes =

Class of fungi

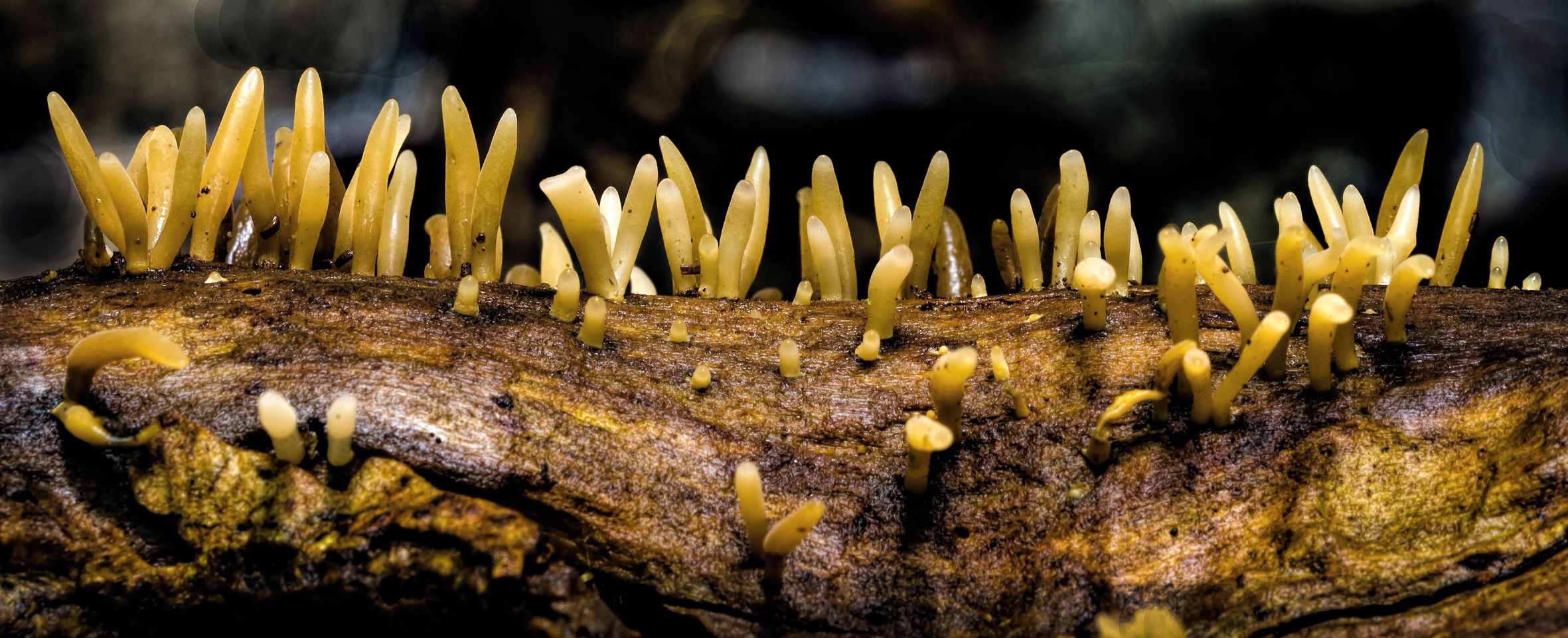
Heterobasidiomycetes found in a nature reserve near Comboyne, New South Wales, Australia

Heterobasidiomycetes, including jelly fungi, smuts and rusts, are basidiomycetes with septate basidia. This contrasts them to homobasidiomycetes (alternatively called holobasidiomycetes), including most mushrooms and other Agaricomycetes, which have aseptate basidia. The division of all basidiomycetes between these two groups has been influential in fungal taxonomy, and is still used informally, but it is no longer the basis of formal classification. In modern taxonomy homobasidiomycetes roughly correspond to the monophyletic class Agaricomycetes, whereas heterobasidiomycetes are paraphyletic and as such correspond to various taxa from different taxonomic ranks, including the Basidiomycota other than Agaricomycetes and a few basal groups within Agaricomycetes.

== Distinction between homo- and heterobasidiomycetes ==
In addition to having septate basidia, heterobasidiomycetes also frequently possess large irregularly shaped sterigmata and spores that are capable of self-replication – a process where a spore, instead of germinating into a vegetative hypha, gives rise to a sterigma and a new spore, which is then discharged as if from a normal basidium. In contrast, homobasidiomycetes, in addition to having aseptate basidia, generally have small regularly shaped sterigmata and spores that do not self-replicate. In different classifications, different features have been stressed.

== Intermediate forms ==
Certain taxa, such as Dacrymycetaceae, Ceratobasidiaceae or Tulasnellaceae, due to possessing a combination of hetero- as well as homobasidiomycetous features, have been difficult to definitively assign to either group, resulting in dissenting opinions among taxonomists. For example, Dacrymycetaceae possess very large and irregularly shaped sterigmata as well as self-replicating spores, but have aseptate basidia. Tulasnellaceae have self-replicating spores and grossly swollen sterigmata that are separated from the basidium with a septum at the base, however the basidial body itself is not septate and the sterigmata and the basidium are quite regularly shaped. Ceratobasidiaceae have aseptate basidia, but the sterigmata are quite large and irregular and the spores are self-replicating.

== History ==
The terms homo- and heterobasidiomycetes were coined by Patouillard in 1900 ("Hétérobasidiés" and "Homobasidiés"). He divided all basidiomycetes between these two groups. This distinction formed the basis of various classifications up to the end of the 20th century. The terms have been used for taxa at the subclass but later at the class level, as fungi were elevated from a phylum of plants to an independent kingdom (consequently shifting the class Basidiomycetes to the phylum Basidiomycota).

Homobasidiomycetes have been present in most if not all major classifications throughout the 20th century (called holobasidiomycetes in some), and only vary with regard to which of the groups combining both hetero- and homobasidiomycetous features are included. The composition of Heterobasidiomycetes has been more variable. In addition to the variable inclusion or exclusion of groups with intermediate features, they have frequently been split into two different groups alongside homobasidiomycetes (one including either only smuts or both smuts and rusts, and the other including the remaining heterobasidiomycetes, mainly jelly fungi). Toward the end of the 20th century, the term "heterobasidiomycetes" has sometimes been reserved to jelly fung only, excluding smuts and rusts.

Throughout most of the 20th century, no single one of these systems gained dominance over the others. In the last quarter of the 20th century, micrography of the septal pore apparatus began to clarify the true phylogenetic relationships in Basidiomycota. However, it was not until the use of molecular systematics in the 90s and early 2000s that fungal taxonomy arrived at a consensus.

Brefeld 1987	Patouillard 1900	Lowy 1968	Talbot 1968	Donk 1972	Wells 1994
Protobasidiomycetes (septate basidia) Auricularieae Tremellineae Uredineae (=Pucciniales) Ustilagineae Autobasidiomycetes (aseptate basidia) containing only homobasidiomycetes sensu stricto	Hétérobasidiés (self-replicating spores, septate basidia) Auriculariaceae Caloceraceae (=Dacrymycetaceae) Tremellaceae Tulasnellaceae Homobasidiés (spores not self-replicating, basidia aseptate) containing only homobasidiomycetes sensu stricto	Heterobasidiomycetidae (completely septate basidia) Ustilaginales Uredinales (=Pucciniales) Eutremellales (including Auriculariaceae and Tremellaceae) Metabasidiomycetidae (incompletely septate or aseptate basidia, large swollen sterigmata, self-replicating spores) Metatremellales (including Ceratobasidiaceae, Dacrymycetaceae and Tulasnellaceae) Homobasidiomycetidae (completely aseptate basidia, sterigmata not swollen, spores not self-replicating) containing only homobasidiomycetes sensu stricto	Teliobasidiomycetes (meiotically septate basidia, teliospores) smuts rusts Phragmobasidiomycetes (meiotically septate basidia, no teliospores) auricularioid fungi tremelloid fungi Holobasidiomycetes (basidia not meiotically septate; identical to Donk 1972) containing ceratobasidioid, dacrymycetoid and tulasnelloid fungi in addition to homobasidiomycetes sensu stricto	Hemibasidiomycetes (meiotically septate basidia) smuts Phragmobasidiomycetes (meiotically septate basidia) rusts auricularioid fungi tremelloid fungi Holobasidiomycetes (basidia not meiotically septate; identical to Talbot 1968) containing ceratobasidioid, dacrymycetoid and tulasnelloid fungi in addition to homobasidiomycetes sensu stricto	Teliomycotina (septal pore simple) smuts rusts Basidiomycotina (septal pore complex) Heterobasidiomycetes (basidia septate or if not septate then deeply divided, spores self-replicating) Heterobasidiomycetidae Auriculariales Ceratobasidiales Dacrymycetales Tulasnellales Tremellomycetidae Tremellales Homobasidiomycetes (basidia aseptate, spores not self-replicating) containing only homobasidiomycetes sensu stricto

== Modern view ==
A phylogenetic analysis of nuclear ribosomal genes in 1993 showed that heterobasidiomycetes as originally circumscribed by Patouillard in 1900 in fact correspond quite well to a grade of fungi that is paraphyletic in relation to the homobasidiomycetes, the bulk of the latter forming a monophyletic clade. Remarkably, despite a century long effort, classifications after Patouillard had only increased the distance from the true phylogeny. The subsequent rapid accumulation of molecular data in the past two decades has allowed mycologists to abandon the use of paraphyletic taxa and arrive at a consensus classification based on monophyletic clades that was finalized in 2007.

The bulk of homobasidiomycetes forms a monophyletic clade, constituting majority of the modern Agaricomycetes. Heterobasidiomycetes correspond to most Basidiomycota other than the homobasidiomycetes: the subphyla Ustilaginomycotina (smuts), Pucciniomycotina (rusts and a variety of other forms), and from the subphylum Agaricomycotina the classes Tremellomycetes and Dacrymycetes, the orders Auriculariales and Sebacinales within the class Agaricomycetes, and the families Ceratobasidiaceae and Tulasnellaceae from the agaricomycete order Cantharellales (these members of the Agaricomycotina, save for the web-like Ceratobasidiaceae, are collectively known as the jelly fungi).

- Basidiomycota
  - Agaricomycotina
    - - Agaricomycetes
        - - Agaricomycetidae
            - Agaricales
            - Amylocorticiales
            - Atheliales
            - Boletales
          - Russulales
          - - Polyporales
            - Thelephorales
          - Gloeophyllales
          - Corticiales
          - Hymenochaetales
        - Phallomycetidae
          - Geastrales
          - Gomphales
          - Hysterangiales
          - Phallales
        - Trechisporales
        - Cantharellales
          - - Botryobasidiaceae
            - Cantharellaceae
            - Clavulinaceae
            - Hydnaceae
          - Ceratobasidiaceae
          - Tulasnellaceae
        - Sebacinales
        - Auriculariales
      - Dacrymycetes
    - Tremellomycetes
  - Pucciniomycotina
  - Ustilaginomycotina

homobasidiomycetes groups with intermediate features heterobasidiomycetes
