= Rhizoctonia theobromae =

Scientific classification
- Domain: Eukaryota
- Kingdom: Fungi
- Division: Basidiomycota
- Class: Agaricomycetes
- Order: Cantharellales
- Family: Ceratobasidiaceae
- Genus: Rhizoctonia
- Species: R. theobromae

Binomial name
- Rhizoctonia theobromae (P.H.B. Talbot & Keane) Oberw., R. Bauer, Garnica, R. Kirschner (2013)

Synonyms
- Ceratobasidium theobromae (P.H.B. Talbot & Keane) Samuels & Keane (2012); Thanatephorus theobromae (P.H.B. Talbot & Keane) P. Roberts (1999); Oncobasidium theobromae P.H.B. Talbot & Keane (1971)

Species of fungus

Rhizoctonia theobromae is a species of fungus in the order Cantharellales. Basidiocarps (fruit bodies) are thin, effused, and web-like. The species is tropical to sub-tropical and is mainly known as a plant pathogen, the causative agent of vascular-streak dieback of cocoa (Theobroma cacao).

== See also ==
- List of cacao diseases
