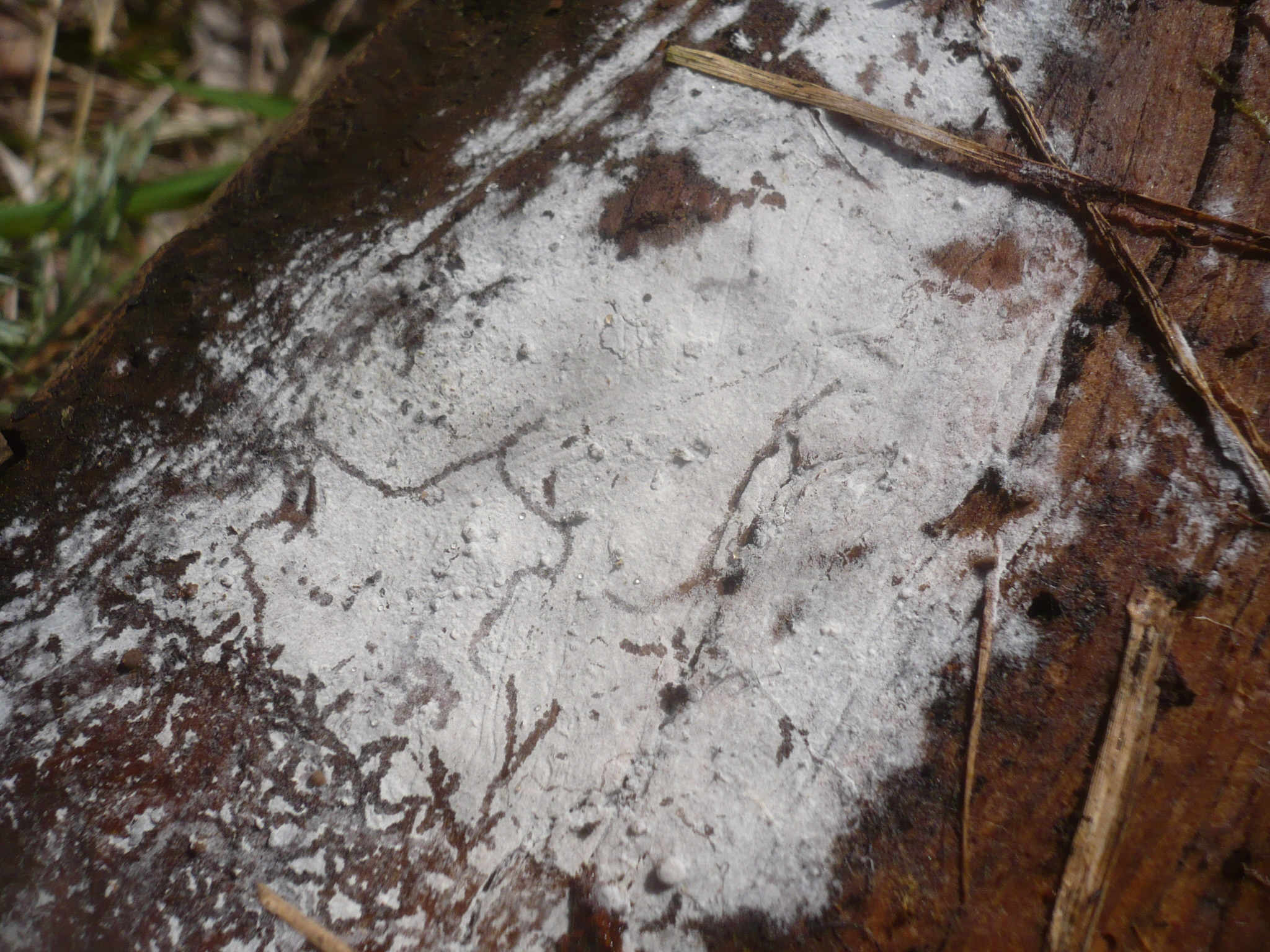
- Botryobasidium subcoronatum

Scientific classification
- Kingdom: Fungi
- Division: Basidiomycota
- Class: Agaricomycetes
- Order: Cantharellales
- Family: Botryobasidiaceae (Parm.) Jülich (1982)

Genera
- Botryobasidium; Suillosporium

Synonyms
- Botryobasidioideae Parm. (1968); Botryohypochnoideae Parm. (1968); Botryohypochnaceae (Parm.) Jülich (1982)

= Botryobasidiaceae =

Family of fungi

The Botryobasidiaceae are a family of fungi in the order Cantharellales. The family contains a group of corticioid fungi that form thin, web-like basidiocarps. Some species form asexual anamorphs producing chlamydospores. All are believed to be wood-rotting or litter-rotting saprotrophs. None is known to be of any economic importance.

== Taxonomy ==
=== History ===
The name Botryobasidioideae was first introduced as a subfamily of the Corticiaceae in 1958 by Swedish mycologist John Eriksson, but was not fully described and validly published until taken up by Estonian mycologist Erast Parmasto in 1968. Parmasto placed the genera Botryobasidium (together with the anamorphic genus Oidium) and Uthatobasidium within the subfamily, noting that they shared certain "primitive" characters linking them to the Ceratobasidiaceae and Tulasnellaceae.

In 1982 Jülich raised the subfamily to the rank of family, as the Botryobasidiaceae, and placed it in a new order, the Botryobasidiales (which also included the family Botryohypochnaceae). A standard 1995 reference work included within the Botryobasidiaceae the corticioid genera Botryobasidium, Botryodontia, Botryohypochnus (considered a synonym of Botryobasidium), Candelabrochaete, Suillosporium, and Waitea, based mainly on similarities in their basidiocarp micromorphology. The family was placed in the order Stereales.

=== Current status ===
Molecular research, based on cladistic analysis of DNA sequences, has confirmed the Botryobasidiaceae as a separate family, but restricted to the genus Botryobasidium, including its anamorphs and Botryohypochnus. The family is placed alongside the Ceratobasidiaceae and Tulasnellaceae within the order Cantharellales. Genera previously included within the Botryobasidiaceae have now been placed in the Corticiales (Waitea), Hymenochaetales (Botryodontia), and Polyporales (Candelabrochaete). The disposition of Suillosporium is as yet unknown.

== Habitat and distribution ==
According to a 2008 estimate, the Botryobasidiaceae contains around 80 species worldwide. Species are assumed to be wood- and litter-rotting saprotrophs and are typically found on the undersides of fallen, rotting branches in woodland leaf litter. Basidiocarps are thin and ephemeral. None is known to be of any economic importance.
