= Ceratobasidium ramicola =

Scientific classification
- Kingdom: Fungi
- Division: Basidiomycota
- Class: Agaricomycetes
- Order: Cantharellales
- Family: Ceratobasidiaceae
- Genus: Ceratobasidium
- Species: C. ramicola

Binomial name
- Ceratobasidium ramicola C.C. Tu, Roberts & Kimbr., (1969)

Synonyms
- Ceratorhiza ramicola (W.A. Weber & D.A. Roberts) R.T. Moore, (1987); Rhizoctonia ramicola W.A. Weber & D.A. Roberts, (1951)

Species of fungus

Ceratobasidium ramicola is an endophytic fungal plant pathogen.
