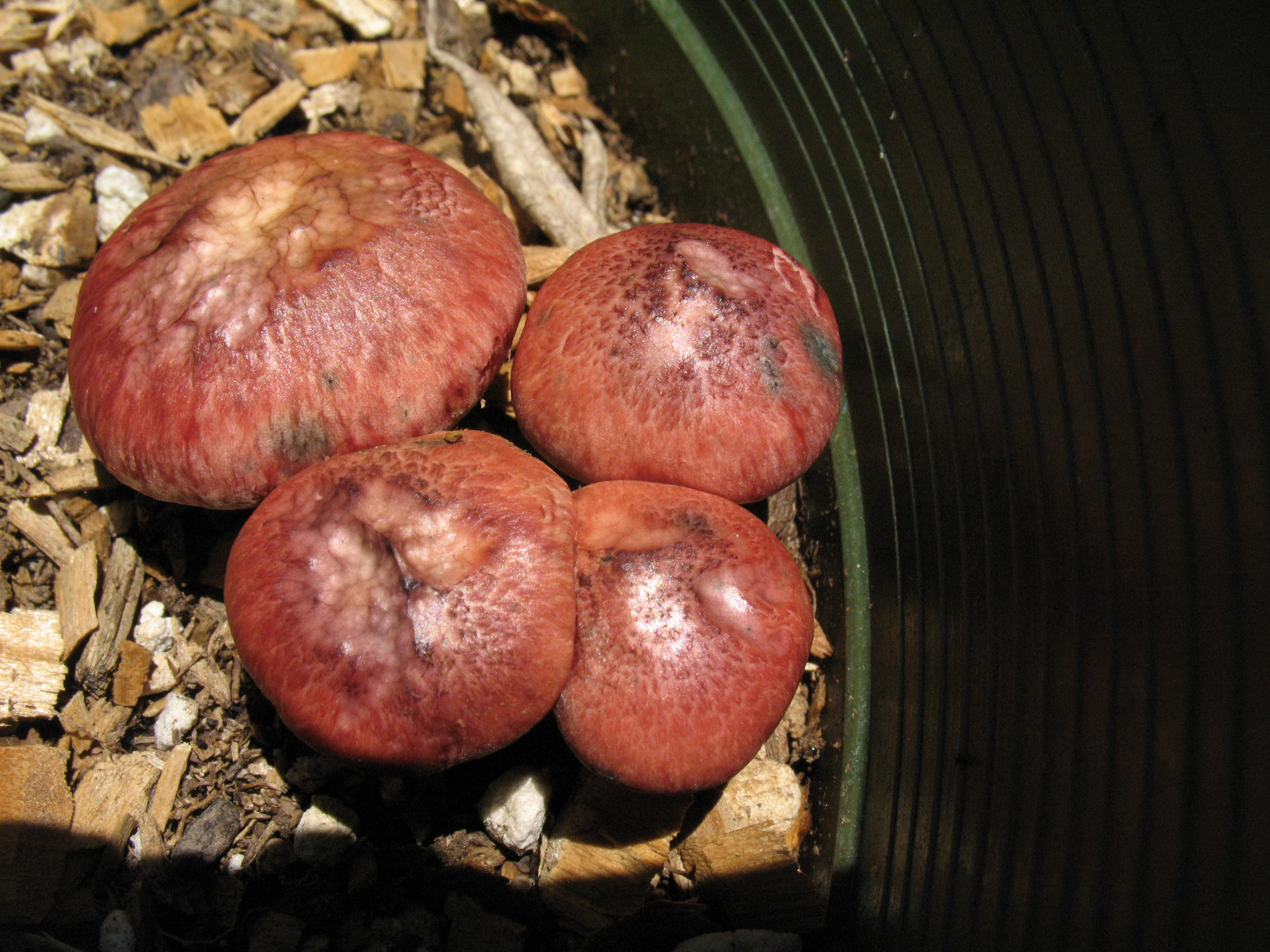
- Gymnopilus luteofolius

Scientific classification
- Domain: Eukaryota
- Kingdom: Fungi
- Division: Basidiomycota
- Class: Agaricomycetes
- Subclass: Homobasidiomycetidae

= Homobasidiomycetidae =

Subclass of fungi

Homobasidiomycetidae is one of the two subclasses of the class Agaricomycetes which is contained in the Kingdom of Fungi. The other subclass is Gasteromycetidae.
