= Pit connection =

In algal anatomy, a pit connection is a hole in the septum between two algal cells, and is found only in multicellular red algae − specifically in the subphylum Eurhodophytina, except haploid Bangiales. They are often stoppered with proteinaceous "pit plugs". By contrast, many fungi (only ascomycetes and basidiomycetes, as most other groups lack septa) contain septal pores − an unrelated phenomenon.

== Characteristics ==
A sieve-like membrane may cover the pit in living algae, but in the majority of algae a plug forms, they likely limit the transfer of metabolites between neighbouring cells.

== Formation ==
Primary pit connections are formed between cells in the same filament, derived from the same parent cell by its division. Such connections are always single, and usually circular; this is a result of their method of formation. The septum is formed as the walls of a filament grow inwards, dividing the cell; this results in a hole in the middle of the tube where the walls don't quite merge. Thus pit connections are visible in the youngest of septa, widening as the septum thickens, until in some cases they may ultimately occupy the entire septum. Secondary connections, by contrast, occur between unrelated cells, and serve a role in transferring cell contents and nutrients. They may even form between cells of different species, as in the parasite Holmsella.
