= Royall T. Moore =

American-born mycologist (1930–2014)

Royall Tyler Moore
- Born: October 11, 1930; Varna, New York, U.S.
- Died: August 17, 2014 (aged 83); Coleraine, Northern Ireland
- Education: Michigan State College; Harvard University
- Known for: New species Fungal diversity and development
- Awards: Benefactor's Medal, British Mycological Society; Doctor of Science
- Scientific career
- Fields: Mycology
- Doctoral advisor: Ivan Mackenzie Lamb
- Author abbrev. (botany): R.T. Moore

Royall Tyler Moore (October 11, 1930 – August 17, 2014) was an American-born British mycologist and mycology professor.

== Education and work ==
He received his doctorate from the Harvard University in 1959, writing his dissertation on the fungal genus Sporidesmium. Later, he worked at Cornell University, the University of California, Berkeley, and North Carolina State University on the classification and development of fungi before joining the faculty at Ulster University at Coleraine. Moore bequeathed almost $500,000 to Cornell University to promote the study of mycology.

== Selected publications ==
- Moore, RT. 1959. The Sporidesmium complex. Thesis (Ph.D.), Dept. of Biology, Harvard University.
- Moore, RT. 1959. The genus Berkleasmium. Mycologia 51(5): 734–739.
- Moore, RT. 1960. Fine Structure of Mycota 2. Demonstration of the haustoria of lichens. Mycologia 52(5): 805–807.
- Moore, RT. 1963. Fine Structure of Mycota XI. Occurrence of the golgi dictyosome in the heterobasidiomycete Puccinia podophylli. Journal of Bacteriology 86(4): 866–871.
- Moore, RT. 1989. Alicean taxonomy–small characters made large. Botanical Journal of the Linnean Society 99(1): 59–79.
- Moore, RT. 1992. The genus Bauhinus gen. nov.: for species of Ustilago on dicot hosts. Mycotaxon 45: 97–100.

== See also ==
- Category:Taxa named by Royall T. Moore
- List of mycologists
