= Orchid mycorrhiza =

Symbiotic relationship between orchids and some fungi

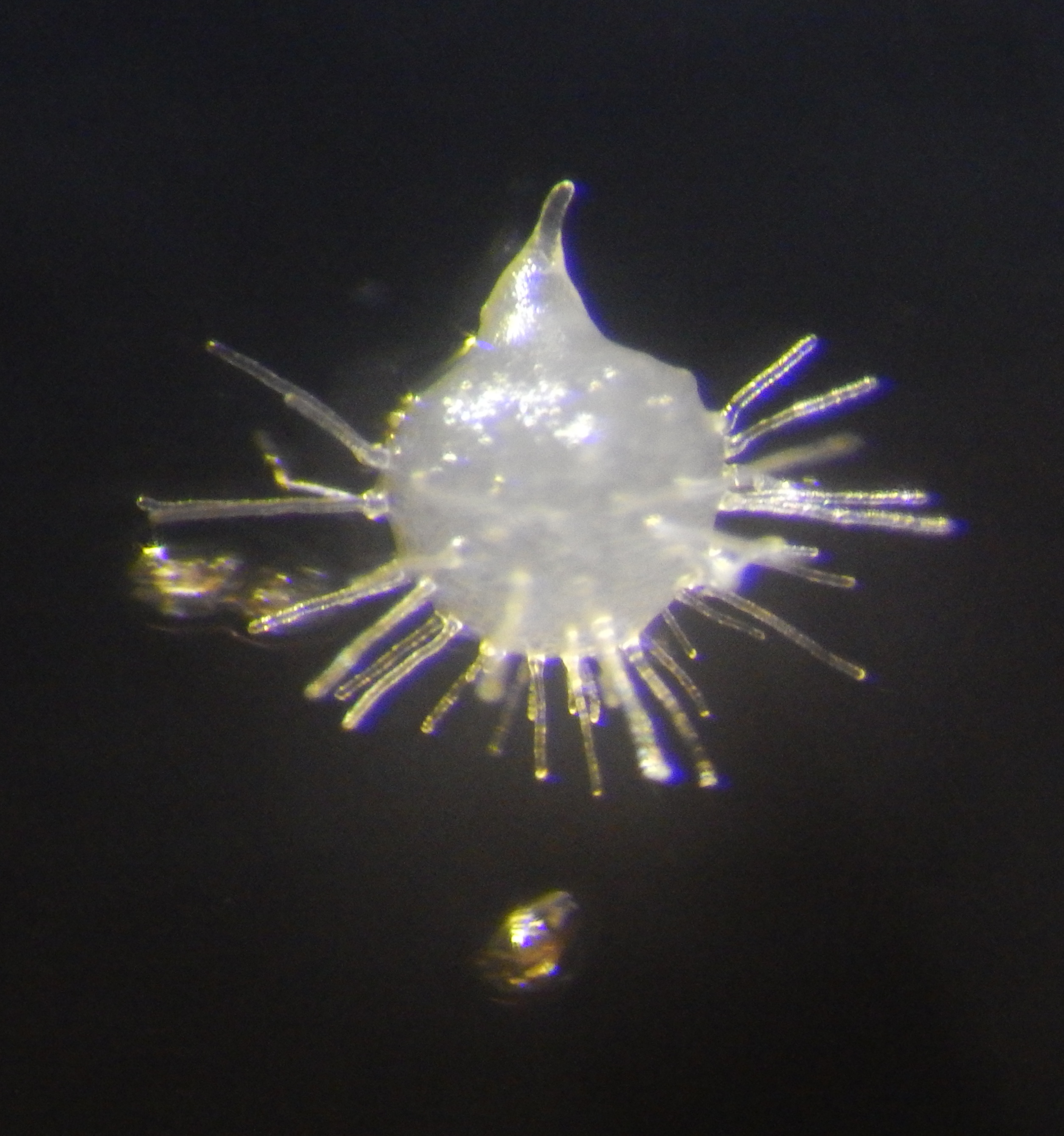
Protocorm of Himantoglossum adriaticum

Orchid mycorrhizae are endomycorrhizal fungi which develop symbiotic relationships with the roots and seeds of plants of the family Orchidaceae. Nearly all orchids are myco-heterotrophic at some point in their life cycle. Orchid mycorrhizae are critically important during orchid germination, as an orchid seed has virtually no energy reserve and obtains its carbon from the fungal symbiont.

The symbiosis starts with a structure called a protocorm. During the symbiosis, the fungus develops structures called pelotons within the root cortex of the orchid.

Many adult orchids retain their fungal symbionts throughout their lives, although the benefits to the adult photosynthetic orchid and the fungus remain largely unexplained.

== Seed germination ==
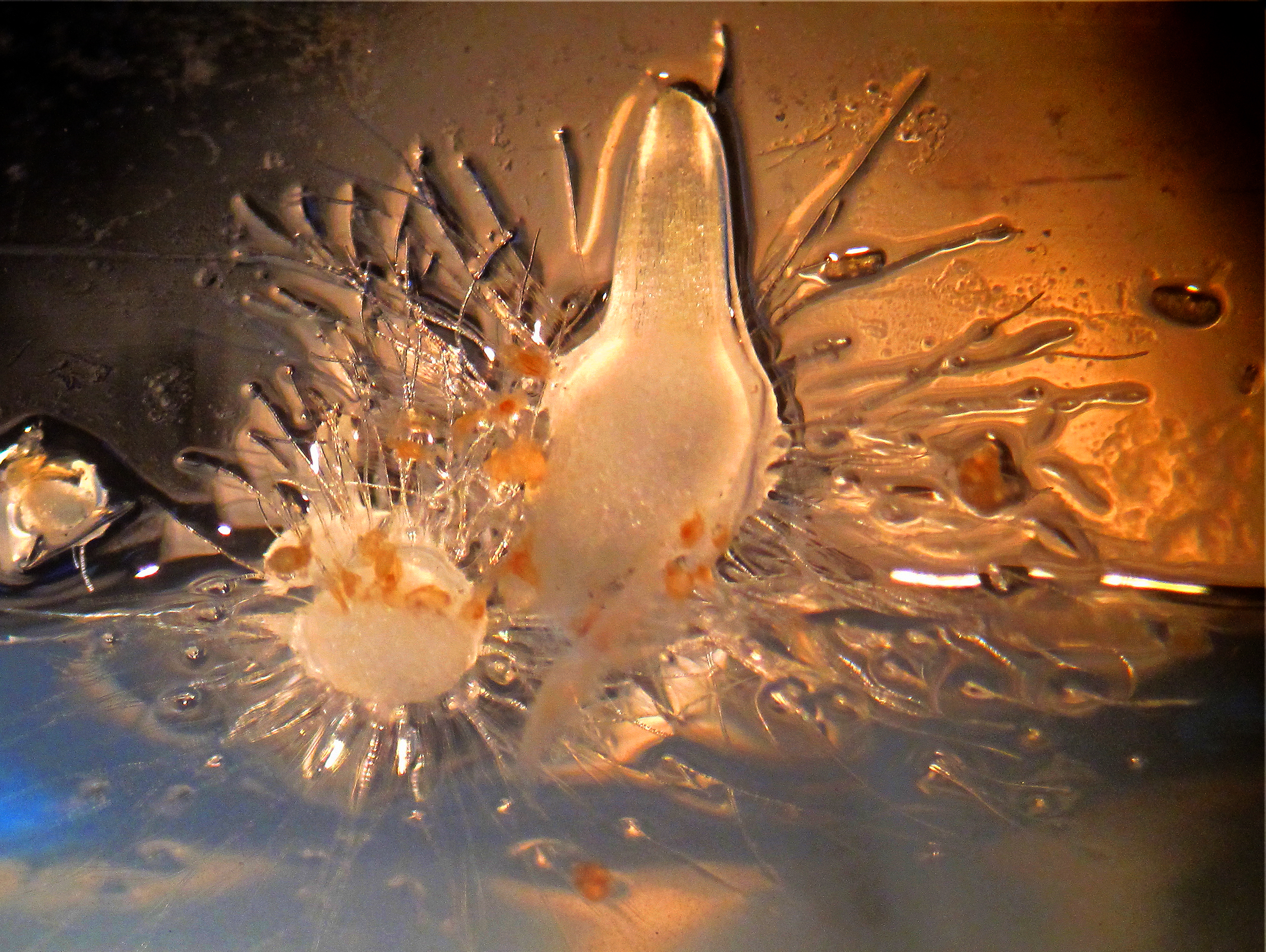
Protocorm of Anacamptis coriophora

Orchids have several life stages. The first stage is the non-germinated orchid seed, the next stage is the protocorm, and the following stage is the adult orchid. Orchid seeds are very small (0.35mm to 1.50mm long), spindle-shaped, and have an opening at the pointed end. Each seed has an embryo that is undifferentiated and lacks root and shoot meristems. An orchid seed does not have enough nutritional support to grow on its own, and lacks endosperm. Instead, it gets nutrients needed for germination from fungal symbionts in natural habitats.

When an orchid seed germinates it forms an intermediate structure called protocorm, young plants which have germinated but lack leaves and which consist mainly of parenchyma cells. Infected protocorms tend to develop an active meristem within a few days. In the adult stage, many orchids have a small amount of thick unbranched roots which results in a root system with a small surface area that is favorable to potentially mycotrophic tissue.

Orchids lacking chlorophyll, called achlorophyllous mycoheterotrophs, will retain their fungal symbionts their entire lives, relying on the fungus for carbon.

The debate over whether fungal symbiosis is necessary for the orchid is an old one, as Noël Bernard first proposed orchid symbiosis in 1899. In 1922 the American botanist Lewis Knudson discovered that orchid seeds could be grown on agar and fungal sugars without mycorrhizae, however modern research has found that the germination of orchids may be more successful with specific fungi.

Although epiphytic orchids grow on other plants they may produce chlorophyll in their leaves, stems, and roots. As with all orchids, germination and the development into protocorms is reliant upon fungal symbionts, which decrease the time of germination and increase the vigor of the protocorm. The reliance of orchids on specific fungi has been widely studied, and the populations of certain fungi which are present in the soil have proved to be of greater importance in seed germination than the orchid's proximity to older plants or their geographical location, as previously assumed.

== Fungal entry into orchid ==
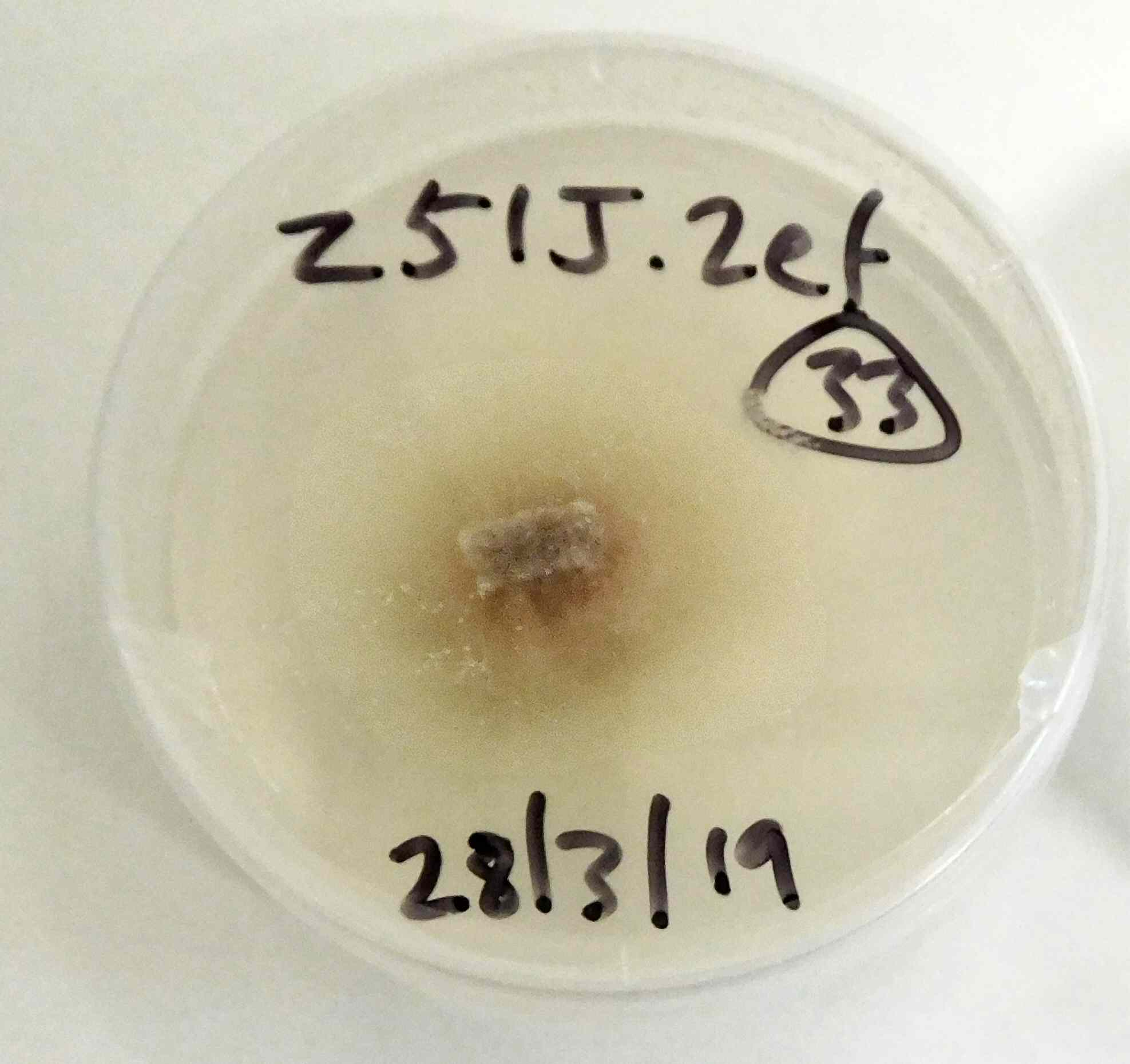
Orchid mycorrhizal fungus from Zambia on agar plate, Jodrell Laboratory, Kew Gardens

Fungi can enter at various orchid life stages. Fungal hyphae can penetrate the parenchyma cells of germinated orchid seeds, protocorms, late-staged seedlings, or adult plant roots. The fungal hyphae that enter the orchid have many mitochondria and few vacuoles., thus increasing their metabolic capacity when paired with an accepting symbiote. In the protocorm stage hyphae enter the chalazal (top) end of the embryo, however in terrestrial orchids fungal entry into adult plant roots happens mainly through root hair tips which then take on a distorted shape. The symbiosis is typically maintained throughout the lifetime of the orchid because they depend on the fungus for nutrients, sugars and minerals. However, some orchids have been found to switch fungal partners during extreme conditions.

=== Fungal pelotons and orchid root cortex ===
Shortly after the fungus enters an orchid, the fungus produces intracellular hyphal coils called pelotons in the embryos of developing seedlings and the roots of adult plants. The formation of pelotons in root cortical cells is a defining anatomical structure in orchid mycorrhiza that differentiate it from other forms of fungi. The pelotons can range in size and in the arrangement and density packaging of their hyphae. Pelotons are separated from the orchid's cytoplasm by an interfacial matrix and the orchid's plasma membrane. The material that makes up the interfacial matrix can differ depending on the orchid mychorrizal stage of interaction. Orchid cells with degenerating pelotons lack starch grains, whereas the newly invaded orchid cells contain large starch grains, suggesting the hydrolysis of starch resulting from the fungal colonization. There is an enlargement of the nucleus in infected orchid cortical cells and in non-infected cortical cells near an infected area as a result of increased DNA content. The increased DNA content has been correlated with the differentiation of parenchymal cells suggesting its role in orchid growth. As pelotons of live fungal hyphae age and are eventually disintegrated, or lysed, they appear as brown or yellow clumps in the orchid cells. The disintegrated pelotons are an area of considerable interest in current research. The disintegrated pelotons first experience a collapse where orchid microtubules surround the pelotons, which may be the mechanism behind the peloton collapse by producing physiological and structural changes of the hyphae. The cortical cells of older roots tend to have more lysed pelotons than young pelotons. Although pelotons are lysed, new pelotons continue to be formed, which indicates a high amount of new hyphal activity.

== Fungi ==
Basidiomycetous Rhizoctonia Fungi

The fungi that form orchid mycorrhizae are typically basidiomycetes. These come from a range of taxa including Ceratobasidium (Rhizoctonia), Sebacina, Tulasnella and Russula species. Most orchids associate with saprotrophic or pathogenic fungi, while a few associate with ectomycorrhizal fungal species. These latter associations are often called tripartite associations as they involve the orchid, the ectomycorrhizal fungus and its photosynthetic host plant. Some of the challenges in determining host-specificity in orchid mycorrhizae have been the methods of identifying the orchid-specific fungi from other free living fungal species in wild-sourced samples. Even with modern molecular analysis and genomic databases, this can still prove difficult, partially due to the difficulty in culturing fungi from protocorms and identification of fungal samples, as well as changes in evolving rDNA. However it has become clearer that different fungi may associate with orchids at specific stages, whether at germination, protocorm development, or throughout the orchid's life. The types of orchids and their symbiotic fungi also vary depending on the environmental niches they occupy, whether terrestrial or growing on other plants as an epiphyte.

Ectomycorrhizal Basidiomycota

A number of other basidiomycetous fungi have been documented in various orchids that do not fall under the Rhizoctonia umbrella. In particular, many fully mycoheterotrophic orchids associate with ectomycorrhizal basidiomycetes belonging to genera such as Thelephora, Tomentella and Russula.

Basidiomycetes of the Atractiellales

Ascomycota

Though rare in orchids, ascomycete associations have been documented in several orchid species. The European terrestrial orchid Epipactis helleborine has a specific association with ectomycorrhizal ascomycetes in the Tuberaceae.

== Nutrient transport ==
Orchids mycorrhiza (OM) are found in approximately 10% of the botanical diversity of earth and have unique and specialized mycorrhizal nutrient transfer interactions which define the fitness and diversity of the orchid family. Orchid mycorrhizal associations involve a plethora of unique nutrient transport systems, structures and phenomena which have only been observed in the family Orchidaceae. These interactions are formed between basidiomycete fungi and all Orchidaceae species. The basidiomycete fungi most commonly found associated with orchids, rhizoctonia, are known for their saprophytic abilities making this fungi orchid association anomalous, allowing both the plant and fungi to access a source of carbon within the mycorrhizal association not available in arbuscular mycorrhiza.

The way and degree to which different orchid species exploit these interactions varies. Orchid mycorrhizal interactions can range from wholly parasitic on the fungal partner, to a mutualistic interaction involving bidirectional nutrient transfer between the plant and mycorrhizal fungus. Orchid plants have an obligatory parasitic life stage at germination where all of their nutrients must be supplied by a fungus. After germination, the orchid mycorrhizal interactions will become specialized to utilize the carbon and nutrients available in the environment surrounding the interaction. These associations are often thought to be dictated by the plant. It has been indicated in past studies that orchid plant individuals which inhabit dense highly shaded forests may depend significantly more on their fungal partner for carbon, varying within and between species, demonstrating the variable and reactive nature of these interactions.

=== Nutrient transfer interfaces and mechanisms ===
At infection of an orchid by a mycorrhizal fungus both partners are altered considerably to allow for nutrient transfer and symbiosis. Nutrient transfer mechanisms and the symbiotic mycorrhizal peloton organs start to appear only shortly after infection around 20–36 hours after initial contact. There is significant genetic upregulation and downregulation of many different genes to facilitate the creation of the symbiotic organ, and the pathways with which nutrients travel. As the fungus enters the parenchyma cells of the orchid the plasma membrane invaginates to facilitate fungal infection and growth. This newly invaginated plasma membrane surrounds the growing pelotons and creates a huge surface area from which nutrients can be exchanged. The pelotons of orchid mycorrhiza are intensely coiled dense fungal hyphae that are often more extensive in comparison to endomycorrhizal structures of arbuscular mycorrhiza. The surrounding plant membrane essentially becomes rough endoplasmic reticulum with high amounts of ribosomes and a plethora of transporter proteins, and aquaporins. Additionally there is evidence from electron microscopy that indicates the occurrence of exocytosis from the plant membrane. This highly convoluted and transporter rich membrane expertly performs the duties of nutrient exchange between the plant and fungus and allows for molecular manipulation by ribosomes and excreted enzymes within the interfacial apoplast. Pelotons are not permanent structures and are readily degraded and digested within 30 to 40 hours of their formation in orchid mycorrhiza. This happens in all endomycorrhizal associations but orchid plants readily digest fungal pelotons sooner after formation and more often than is seen in arbuscular mycorrhizal interactions. It is proposed that the occurrence of this more extreme digestive pattern may have something to do with necrotorphic nutrient transfer which is the absorption of nutrients form dead cells. The key nutrients involved in the majority of the transfer between fungi and orchid plants are carbon, nitrogen and phosphorus.

Orchid mycorrhizal interactions are unique in the flow of nutrients. Typically in arbuscular mycorrhizal interactions the plants will unidirectionally supply the fungi with carbon in exchange for phosphorus or nitrogen or both depending on the environment, but orchid mycorrhizal nutrient transfer is less specific (but no less regulated) and there is often bidirectional flow of carbon between the fungus and plant, as well as flow of nitrogen and phosphorus from the fungus to plant. In around 400 species of plants there is no flow of carbon from plant and all of the nutrients of the plant are supplied by the fungus. However, the net carbon gain by the plant in these interactions is positive in majority of the observed interactions.

=== Phosphorus transport ===
Phosphorus is a crucial nutrient needed by all plants and often phosphorus deficiency in soil will dictate the formation of a symbiotic relationship. Phosphorus is obtained by the mycorrhizal fungus from the surrounding soil in three different forms; organic phosphorus, phosphate, and inorganic phosphorus compounds. Often, these compounds are strongly bound to cations and need to be protonated and, or catabolized to become bioavailable. Mycorrhizal fungi are extremely efficient at doing this due to their extensive soil surface area as well as high enzymatic diversity. Once freed from the soil the phosphorus compounds, primarily inorganic phosphate, are transferred through two proposed pathways. The first involves the active transport of inorganic phosphorus, primarily as phosphate through Pi (inorganic phosphorus) transporters out of the fungus into the interfacial apoplast, where it is protonated due to the acidic nature of the interfacial apoplast to form dihydrogen phosphate and then subsequently transferred through active Pi transporters into the plant cell. The second method relies on passive efflux of Pi from the fungus and active uptake by the plant, as in the prior pathway. It is observed that free living fungi ordinarily have very slight losses of Pi, thought to be due to the re-absorptive nature of the fungal hyphae, but it is proposed that during symbiosis the reabsorption of Pi is reduced thus increasing the net efflux out of the fungi. Both pathways depend on relatively high concentrations of Pi in the fungal cells and low Pi concentrations inside the plant cell for efficient transport, although the second method is far more dependent on this condition. Additionally these methods are not mutually exclusive and may occur in the same individuals, but more research is required to uncover the complexities of the interaction. To facilitate phosphorus exchange an array of genes are upregulated; Pi transporter genes such as MtPT4 and StPT3 are up regulated in orchids plants along with H+ ATPase transporters. Fungal partners upregulated Pi transporter genes as well as alkaline phosphatase encoding genes (Perotto). The upregulation of phosphatase genes is significant in that it indicates that a significant portion of the phosphorus obtained by the fungi in some environments may be from organic molecule catabolism. Once a mycorrhizal symbiosis is established, the only phosphorus obtained by the plant comes through the fungal tissue. Additionally the large scale assisted transport of phosphorus from fungi to plant only occurs when the fungal pelotons are alive, and once these structures start to degrade significant flow of phosphorus ceases. This classifies this pathway as biotrophic, meaning transfer of nutrients between two or more organisms that are both alive.

=== Nitrogen transport ===
Nitrogen transport is an equally important and influential process that often occurs through mycorrhizal associations. Nitrogen is significantly easier to obtain than phosphorus and far more abundant, but mycorrhizal interactions still provide a significant benefit in the allocation of nitrogen. Bioavailable nitrogen as nitrate and ammonium are absorbed from the soil media into the extraradical mycelium of the mycorrhizal fungi and assimilated into amino acids. In some cases amino acids and other nitrogenous organic compounds may be present in the surrounding soil. If so organic nitrogen uptake also takes place through amino acid permeases and peptide transporters. Once incorporated into the fungi as amino acids, there are a few different proposed mechanisms with which the nitrogen is transferred to the host plant. These pathways of nitrogen transfer are thought to be exclusively biotrophic, a significant amount of nitrogen may also be transferred necrotorphically but through a significantly different process. In the first pathway the amino acids are transferred to the extraradical mycelium where the amino acids are broken down by the catabolic stage of the urea cycle. The primary amino acid synthesized and intra-fungally transferred is arginine, which is catabolized into ammonium. The ammonium is then shunted into the interfacial space between the peloton and the surrounding plant membrane, and transported into the plant cell via ammonium transporters and incorporated into the plant.

To accommodate the transport of nitrogen via this pathway, primarily as ammonium, an array of ammonium transporter genes are up regulated in the plant partners, and additionally the mycorrhizal fungal partners often upregulate a group of protease genes as well as external amino acid permeases, nitrate transporters and ammonium transporters. As proposed by Cameron 2006 and Fochi 2016, nitrogen may also be transferred as amino acids such as arginine, glycine and glutamine into the cell via a select few specialized amino acid transporters. When in symbiotic relationship with orchid plants the mycorrhizal fungus T. calospora upregulates the expression of SvAAP1 and SvAAP2, these genes encode amino acid permeases, supporting the hypothesis that amino acids are an important molecule involved in nitrogen transport. Amino acids contain a significant amount of carbon as well and the transport of carbon may be the primary driving cause of the observed upregulation of the amino acid transporter genes, nonetheless nitrogen can still be transported to the plant via this pathway. The transport of inorganic nitrogen in the form of ammonium and the transport of organic nitrogen as amino acids most likely will occur simultaneously in the same species and or organism, depending on the abundance of different nitrogenous species in the soil, Fochi 2016 along with Dearnaley 2007 suggest that amino acids may in fact be the primary nitrogen compound transferred to orchids, evidence for this coming from isotopic ratios of enriched C13 and N15 within plants associated with mycorrhizal fungi, but more research is needed to fully understand this transport relationship.

=== Carbon transport ===
Apart from the unique peloton structures which transfer nitrogen and phosphorus from mycorrhizal fungi to orchid plants the transfer of these nutrients, as discussed above is almost identical to that observed in arbuscular mycorrhiza and ericoid mycorrhiza, but when it comes to arguably the most fundamental element involved in mycorrhizal transport carbon, orchid mycorrhiza show a distinct divergence form the traditional paradigm of unidirectional nutrient transfer in mycorrhizal associations. Orchid mycorrhizal interactions encompass a large variety of symbiotic scenarios, ranging from fully mycoheterotrophic plants or in other words parasitic on their fungal inhabitant such as Monotropa uniflora which lacks chlorophyll, to interactions that take on a similar nature to those found in arbuscular mycorrhiza, where in bidirectional nutrient transport takes place such as in green leaved Goodyera repens. For the documented interactions in orchid mycorrhiza it has been observed that even in photosynthetically capable species carbon will readily flow from fungi to the plant. This may or may not occur simultaneously with the transfer of carbon from plant to fungi. The evolutionary reasoning for this phenomenon is yet to be deduced.

Due to this orchid mycorrhiza in general are considered at least partially mycoheterotrophic interactions. In the mycoheterotrophic orchid mycorrhiza carbon is taken up, by the fungi, as an array of peptide and carbohydrate species often the products of saprophytic reactions taking place in the soil. These reactions are often instigated and progressed by the activity of the mycorrhizal fungus, being part of the basidiomycete phyla, orchid associated fungi have an extensive metabolic arsenal with which to pull from, and are readily able to digest cellulose and lignin to obtain the carbon. Genes encoding proteases, cellulose and lignin digestive enzymes, as well as oligopeptide and carbohydrate transporters are upregulated in the mycelial soil webs to facilitate increased carbon uptake. Further more the fungi which mycoheterotrophically interact with orchid plants are often also found in mycorrhizal association with beech trees, and translocation of photosynthate from tree to fungus and then to orchid has been proposed, but a thorough study is still lacking. Once acquired by the fungus the carbon is either converted into sugars, trehalose being extremely common for most mycorrhizal fungus, amino acids, or simply assimilated into the fungal organism. The transfer of carbon from fungi to plant happens in one of two forms either as carbohydrates primarily trehalose, but glucose and sucrose may also be involved, or as an amino acids primarily as arginine but glycine and glutamine can also be transferred. These molecules are transported, via specialized amino acid permeases and carbohydrate transporters embedded in the fungal peloton membrane, into the interficial space where they are absorbed into the plant through similar analogous transporters in the plant endoplasmic reticulum membrane which surrounds the peloton. Genes which encode for such transporters experience significant upregulation in both plant and fungi, similar to the upregulation seen in nitrogen and phosphorus compound transporter genes during symbiosis. This active transport of carbon from fungi to plant is an exclusively biotrophic reaction but it is thought that a significant amount of carbon may also be transferred to the plant when the fungal pelotons degrade and are digested.

=== Mycophagy (necrotrophy) ===
The transfer of nitrogen and carbon as discussed above readily occurs through live pelotons, but it has been observed by Kuga 2014 and Rasumussen 2009 that large amount of carbon and nitrogen may also be taken up by the plant during the senescence and digestion of fungal pelotons. This process is called mycophagy. Lysis of pelotons begins between 30 and 40 hours after contact and initial peloton formation within the majority of observed orchid plants. As mentioned above as pelotons are formed they are covered by a plant derived membrane, which eventually takes on the properties of endoplasmic reticulum surrounded by Golgi apparatuses. The presence of these organelles is indicative of their purpose, which is thought to be the excretion of digestive enzymes into the interficial space between the peloton and the plant membrane to digest the fungal cells. Once the fate of the peloton is decided, and degradation and digestion are to occur, a secondary membrane forms around the fungal peloton which is essentially a large vacuole which will allow the isolated degradation of the peloton. Additionally peroxisomes accumulate within the digestive plant cells and undergo exosytosis into the newly formed vacuole, this process concentrates a plethora of enzymes such as uricases, chitinases, peptidases, oxidases and catalyses within the vacuole facilitating the breakdown of the peloton. Once degraded the fungal remnants are absorbed into the plant, transferring the nutrients and energy to the plant host. Stable isotope imaging reveals that C13 and N15 applied to mycorrhizal hyphea webs was found to be readily transferred to the plant via fungal pelotons, leading to a disproportionate amount of these isotopes within the peloton containing plant cells and the peloton itself, but in senescing pelotons the concentrations of these C13 and N15 containing compound was even more pronounced, and significantly higher than in live pelotons. This indicates that as plant pelotons start to senescence they are loaded with carbon and nitrogen nutritive compounds, hypothetically to be transferred to the plant during lysis. Morphological changes in the hyphea further support this proposition, in that the last morphological change in the peloton before is collapses is a swelling, perhaps due to the increased nutritive compound load. Once digestion is complete, reinfection of the digestive cell will occur shortly after and a new peloton will form, and eventually will be degraded. Reinfection and digestion are a continuum and will cyclically occur throughout the entire life span of the cooperation. Rasmussen 2009 differentiates two types of plant host cells which are involved in nutrient transfer, so called 'digestion cells' and so called 'host cells', 'digestive cells' apparently engage in dense hyphal peloton formation followed by a rapid digestion and subsequent reinfection, where as 'host cells' contain live hyphae pelotons, which will not be digested, or at least not as readily. Rasmussen 2002 discusses an additional mode of nutrient transfer called pytophagy involving lysis of fungal cells but instead of lysing the entire fungal hyphae only the growing end is degraded releasing the contents of the fungal cytoplasm into the interfacial space between the plant and fungi membranes, where the plant can uptake the necessary compounds. There is little information on this mode of nutrient transfer and it is still speculative, and more research is needed.

=== Micro-nutrient transfer ===
Micro-nutrient transfer is thought, for the most part, to occur by passive transport across cellular membranes, both during absorption, from soil by fungi, and transfer from fungi to host plants. This is not always the case though and although research on the topic is limited, there is evidence of active transport and allocation of micro-nutrients in certain conditions. The upregulation of cation transporters is observed in orchid D. officinale symbioses, suggesting fungi may assisted in the transfer of nutrients from fungi to plant. Cations, especially iron, are often bound tightly to organic and clay substrates keeping them out of reach of plants, fungi and bacteria, but compounds such as siderophores are often secreted into the soil by fungi and bacteria to aid in the acquisition of these cations. A siderophore is a small molecule which has extremely high affinity for Fe3+ and is commonly found being utilized by many bacteria and fungal species. These compounds are released into the soil surrounding the hyphal web and strip iron from mineral compounds in the soil, the siderophore can then be reabsorbed into the fungal hyphae where the iron can be dissociated from the spiderohore and used. Haselwandter investigated the presence of siderophores in orchid associated mycorrhizal fungi within the genus Rhizoctonia which utilize the siderophore basidiochrome as the major iron-chelating compound. Other vital nutrients may be transferred between mycorrhizal fungi and orchid plants via specialized methods, such as chelating molecules, but more research on this subject is needed.

== Symbiont specificity ==
Current molecular analysis has allowed for the identification of specific taxa forming symbiotic relationships which are of interest in the study, cultivation, and conservation of orchids. This is especially important in the trade and preservation endangered species or orchids of commercial value like the vanilla bean. There have been seen trends in the type of symbioses found in orchids, depending primarily on the life-style of the orchid, as the symbiosis is primarily of benefit to the plant. Terrestrial orchids have been found to commonly associate with Tulasnellaceae, however some autotrophic and non-autotrophic orchids do associate with several ectomycorrhizal fungi. Epiphytic fungi, however, may associate more commonly with limited clades of rhizoctonia, a polyphyletic grouping. These fungi may form significant symbioses with either an epiphytic or terrestrial orchid, but rarely do they associate with both. Using seed-baiting techniques researchers have been able to isolate specific species and strains of symbiotic orchid mycorrhizae. Using this technique seeds of the epiphytic orchid Dendrobium aphyllum were found to germinate to seedlings when paired with fungal strains of Tulasnella, however, seeds of this species did not germinate when treated with Trichoderma fungi taken from adult orchids, indicating there are stage specific symbionts. These fungal symbioses, as well as their affinity towards specific symbionts, vary based on the stage of development and age of the host roots. As an orchid ages the fungal associations become more complex.

Mixotrophic orchids like Cephalanthera longibracteata may associate generally with several fungi, most notably from Russulaceae, Tricholomataceae, Sebacinales, Thelephoraceae, as they do not depend as heavily on the fungus for carbon. Some orchids can be very specific in their symbionts, preferring a single class or genus of fungi. Genotypes of Corallorhiza maculata, a myco-heterotrophic orchid, have been found to closely associate with Russulaceae regardless of geological location or the presence of other orchids. The terrestrial Chilean orchids Chloraea collicensis and C. gavilu have been found to have only one key symbiont in the genus Rhizoctonia. Research suggests that orchids considered to be generalists will associate with other generalist fungi, often with several species, however orchids with high degrees of specialization use a more limited range of fungal partners. For instance, the photosynthetic orchid Liparis liliifolia associates with many strains of fungi in the adult stage. Conversely, the photosynthetic orchid Goodyera pubescens was found to associate with only one dominate fungus, unless subjected to changes in the environment, like drought, in which case the orchid was able to change symbionts in response to stresses. There is a tremendous amount of diversity in orchid fungal specificity. Interestingly, most arbuscular and ectomycorrhizal symbioses form associations with several fungi at the same time. Fungal symbioses also depend on the environment so there are many differences in fungal partners of tropical versus temperate orchids.

The knowledge of species-specific fungal symbionts is crucial given the endangered status of many orchids around the world. The identification of their fungal symbionts could prove useful in the preservation and reintroduction of threatened orchids. Researchers in India have used samples from adult orchids to germinate seeds from an endangered orchid Dactylorhiza hatagirea which were found to associate closely with Ceratobasidium.
