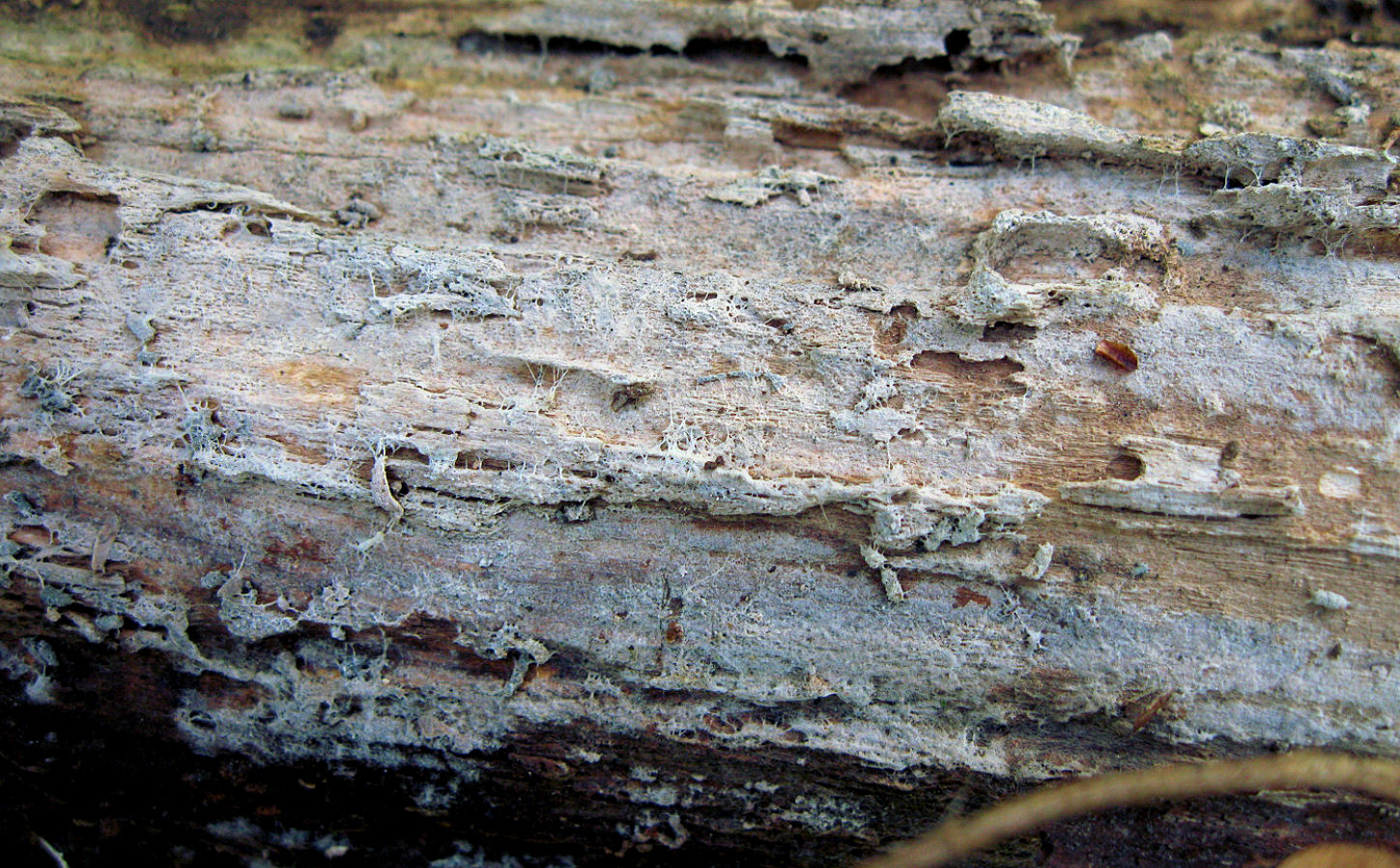
- Ceratobasidium cornigerum

Scientific classification
- Kingdom: Fungi
- Division: Basidiomycota
- Class: Agaricomycetes
- Order: Cantharellales
- Family: Ceratobasidiaceae; G.W. Martin

Type genus
- Ceratobasidium D.P. Rogers

Genera
- Ceratobasidium D.P. Rogers; Rhizoctonia DC.; Scotomyces Jülich

= Ceratobasidiaceae =

Family of fungi

The Ceratobasidiaceae are a family of fungi in the order Cantharellales. All species within the family have basidiocarps (fruit bodies) that are thin and effused. They have sometimes been included within the corticioid fungi or alternatively within the "heterobasidiomycetes". Species are saprotrophic, but some are also facultative plant pathogens or are associated with orchid mycorrhiza. Genera of economic importance include Ceratobasidium and Rhizoctonia, both of which contain plant pathogenic species causing diseases of commercial crops and turf grass.

== Taxonomy ==
The family was created in 1948 by American mycologist G.W. Martin to accommodate species of corticioid fungi with heterobasidiomycete features (elongated sterigmata and basidiospores that give rise to secondary spores). He restricted the Ceratobasidiaceae to the genus Ceratobasidium, though including within the genus species later placed in Thanatephorus and Oliveonia. In 1981, Jülich created the order Ceratobasidiales to accommodate the family. By 1995, the order and the family contained 18 genera, including Ceratobasidium, Heteroacanthella, Oliveonia, Scotomyces, Thanatephorus, and their various synonyms and anamorphs.

=== Current status ===
Molecular research, based on cladistic analysis of DNA sequences, has now shown that the Ceratobasidiaceae do not belong to a separate order, but are part of the Cantharellales. The genera Heteroacanthella and Oliveonia are not closely related to the Ceratobasidiaceae, but have been placed in the Auriculariales. No species of the genus Scotomyces has yet been sequenced.

Following changes to the International Code of Nomenclature for algae, fungi, and plants, the practice of giving different names to teleomorph and anamorph forms of the same fungus was discontinued, meaning that Thanatephorus became a synonym of the earlier name Rhizoctonia, previously used for anamorphic species. DNA evidence also placed most, if not all, Ceratobasidium species in Rhizoctonia.

Research on the septal pore ultrastructure of the little-known and atypical type species of Ceratobasidium, C. calosporum, indicates that it is a member of the Auriculariales and is unrelated to other species of Ceratobasidium. Technically, this means that the Ceratobasidiaceae belong within the Auriculariales, but this is a taxonomic problem that has yet to be resolved.

== Habitat and distribution ==
Species are mainly saprotrophic, occurring in the soil and producing fruit bodies on dead stems and plant detritus. Some occur on attached leaves and stems. Several species have been isolated from orchid mycorrhiza or from diseased crops and turf grass. Distribution appears to be cosmopolitan.

== Economic importance ==
Several species of Ceratobasidium and Rhizoctonia are opportunistic parasites of plants, causing a variety of economically important diseases of crops.
