= List of Peniophora species =

This is a list of species in genus Peniophora. As of June 2015, Index Fungorum lists 176 species in the genus.

== A ==
- Peniophora adjacens
- Peniophora admirabilis
- Peniophora alba
- Peniophora albobadia
- Peniophora albofarcta
- Peniophora albugo
- Peniophora amaniensis
- Peniophora ambiens
- Peniophora anaemacta
- Peniophora arachnoidea
- Peniophora argentea
- Peniophora argentinensis
- Peniophora asperipilata
- Peniophora aurantiaca
- Peniophora avellanea

== B ==
- Peniophora bartholomaei
- Peniophora bicornis
- Peniophora boidinii
- Peniophora bonariensis
- Peniophora borbonica
- Peniophora bruneiensis
- Peniophora burkei

== C ==
- Peniophora caesalpiniae
- Peniophora calcea
- Peniophora canadensis
- Peniophora carnea
- Peniophora ceracea
- Peniophora cinerea
- Peniophora citrinella
- Peniophora coccinea
- Peniophora coffeae
- Peniophora colorea
- Peniophora confusa
- Peniophora coprosmae
- Peniophora corsica
- Peniophora costata
- Peniophora crassitunicata
- Peniophora crustosa
- Peniophora cystidendroides

== D ==
- Peniophora decidua
- Peniophora decolorans
- Peniophora decorticans
- Peniophora dipyrenosperma
- Peniophora discoidea
- Peniophora disparens
- Peniophora duplex

== E ==
- Peniophora elaeidis
- Peniophora ericina
- Peniophora erikssonii
- Peniophora excurrens
- Peniophora exima

== F ==
- Peniophora farinacea
- Peniophora farlowii
- Peniophora fasticata
- Peniophora fimbriata
- Peniophora firma
- Peniophora fissilis
- Peniophora fissoreticulata
- Peniophora flammea
- Peniophora formosana
- Peniophora fracta
- Peniophora frangulae
- Peniophora fulvissima
- Peniophora fulvocinerea
- Peniophora fumigata

== G ==
- Peniophora gabonensis
- Peniophora gelatinosula
- Peniophora gilbertsonii
- Peniophora grisea
- Peniophora guadelupensis

== H ==
- Peniophora halimi
- Peniophora hilitzeri

== I ==
- Peniophora incarnata
- Peniophora indica
- Peniophora inflata
- Peniophora investiens
- Peniophora irregularis
- Peniophora isabellina

== J ==
- Peniophora junipericola

== K ==
- Peniophora kalchbrenneri
- Peniophora kauffmanii

== L ==
- Peniophora laeta
- Peniophora laminata
- Peniophora laurentii
- Peniophora laxitexta
- Peniophora lepida
- Peniophora lilacea
- Peniophora limitata
- Peniophora limonia
- Peniophora lithargyrina
- Peniophora livescens
- Peniophora lutea
- Peniophora lycii

== M ==
- Peniophora macrocystidiata
- Peniophora malaiensis
- Peniophora malenconii
- Peniophora manshurica
- Peniophora media
- Peniophora meridionalis
- Peniophora mimica
- Peniophora miniata
- Peniophora molesta
- Peniophora monticola
- Peniophora multicolor
- Peniophora multicystidiata
- Peniophora muscorum

== N ==
- Peniophora niphodes
- Peniophora nuda

== O ==
- Peniophora odorata
- Peniophora ovalispora
- Peniophora overholtsii
- Peniophora oxydata

== P ==
- Peniophora parvocystidiata
- Peniophora peckii
- Peniophora perexigua
- Peniophora piceae
- Peniophora pilatiana
- Peniophora pinastri
- Peniophora pini
- Peniophora pithya
- Peniophora poincianae
- Peniophora polygonia
- Peniophora proxima
- Peniophora pruinata
- Peniophora pseudonuda
- Peniophora pseudopini
- Peniophora pseudoversicolor
- Peniophora puberula
- Peniophora pusilla

== Q ==
- Peniophora quercina

== R ==
- Peniophora reidii
- Peniophora rhodocarpa
- Peniophora rhodochroa
- Peniophora robusta
- Peniophora rudis
- Peniophora rufomarginata

== S ==
- Peniophora sacrata
- Peniophora scintillans
- Peniophora separans
- Peniophora septentrionalis
- Peniophora seymouriana
- Peniophora shearii
- Peniophora simulans
- Peniophora sordidella
- Peniophora sordidissima
- Peniophora sororia
- Peniophora spathulata
- Peniophora sphaerocystidiata
- Peniophora stratosa
- Peniophora subavellanea
- Peniophora subcarneola
- Peniophora subdiscolor
- Peniophora subgigaspora
- Peniophora subglebulosa
- Peniophora subpirispora
- Peniophora subsalmonea
- Peniophora subsulphurea
- Peniophora subtilis
- Peniophora suecica

== T ==
- Peniophora tabacina
- Peniophora taiwanensis
- Peniophora tamaricicola
- Peniophora taraguiensis
- Peniophora taxodii
- Peniophora tenella
- Peniophora tenuissima
- Peniophora texana
- Peniophora thujae
- Peniophora trigonosperma

== V ==
- Peniophora vernicosa
- Peniophora versicolor
- Peniophora versiformis
- Peniophora verticillata
- Peniophora violaceolivida
- Peniophora viridis

== W ==
- Peniophora wallacei

== Z ==
- Peniophora zonata
