= Tremella versicolor =

Scientific classification
- Kingdom: Fungi
- Division: Basidiomycota
- Class: Tremellomycetes
- Order: Tremellales
- Family: Tremellaceae
- Genus: Tremella
- Species: T. versicolor

Binomial name
- Tremella versicolor Berk. & Broome (1854)

Species of fungus

Tremella versicolor is a species of fungus in the family Tremellaceae. It produces small, pustular, gelatinous basidiocarps (fruit bodies) and is parasitic on the basidiocarps of Peniophora species, a genus of corticioid fungi, on dead attached or recently fallen branches. It was originally described from England.

== Taxonomy ==
Tremella versicolor was first published in 1854 by British mycologists Miles Joseph Berkeley & Christopher Edmund Broome based on several collections from England on basidiocarps of Peniophora nuda on deciduous trees.

== Description ==
Fruit bodies are gelatinous, orange-red to brownish red, initially up to 2.5 mm across, and discoid to pustular. Eventually they coalesce and become effused cerebriform (brain-like), up to 50 mm across. Microscopically, the hyphae have clamp connections and the basidia are tremelloid (ellipsoid, with oblique to vertical septa), 2 to 4-celled, 14 to 30 by 8 to 11 μm. Sterigmata and basidiospores are not formed in the initial, discoid to pustular stage; instead, clusters of small, ellipsoid conidiospores are released, typically with a thin wisp of ribbon-like hypha still attached. In the effused, cerebriform stage, smooth, globose to subglobose basidiospores are produced measuring 5.5 to 8 by 7.5 to 10 μm.

== Similar species ==
Gelatinous fruit bodies of Hormomyces peniophorae are of similar size and shape and were described on basidiocarps of Peniophora lycii in England, but can be distinguished microscopically by having hyphae that lack clamp connections and no known teleomorph (basidia-bearing) state. Tremella versicolor was formerly confused with Tremella subencephala, but this forms fruit bodies on basidiocarps of the corticioid fungus Acanthophysium lividocoeruleum.

== Habitat and distribution ==
Tremella versicolor is a parasite on basidiocarps of the lignicolous, corticioid genus Peniophora, including Peniophora lycii, P. cinerea, P. quercina, P. nuda, P. violaceolivida, P. reidii, and P. incarnata. The hosts typically grow on dead, attached or recently fallen branches of deciduous trees.

The species was originally described from England and has been recorded in Europe from Belgium, Denmark, Germany, Italy, the Netherlands, and Northern Ireland. Old reports from Sweden refer to Tremella subencephala. Tremella versicolor has also been reported from the USA.
