= Dichantharellus =

Scientific classification
- Domain: Eukaryota
- Kingdom: Fungi
- Division: Basidiomycota
- Class: Agaricomycetes
- Order: Russulales
- Family: Lachnocladiaceae
- Genus: Dichantharellus; Corner

Type species
- Dichantharellus malayanus Corner

Species
- D. brunnescens D. malayanus

Genus of fungi

Dichantharellus is a genus of fungi in the Lachnocladiaceae family. The genus contains two species, which are found in Malaysia.
