= Macrosporia nanlingensis =

Scientific classification
- Domain: Eukaryota
- Kingdom: Fungi
- Division: Basidiomycota
- Class: Agaricomycetes
- Order: Polyporales
- Family: Polyporaceae
- Genus: Macrosporia
- Species: M. nanlingensis

Binomial name
- Macrosporia nanlingensis (B.K. Cui & C.L. Zhao) B.K. Cui & Xing Ji (2023)

Synonyms
- Perenniporia nanlingensis B.K.Cui & C.L.Zhao (2012)

Species of fungus

Macrosporia nanlingensis is a poroid fungus first isolated from Guangdong Province, China. It has crust-like fruit bodies with a pinkish pore surface when in dry condition. Microscopically, it has a trimitic hyphal system, a slightly dextrinoid and binding hyphae. Its basidiospores are ellipsoid, truncate, and measure 9.0–9.8 by 5.0–5.9 μm.
