= Root rot =

Disease in plants

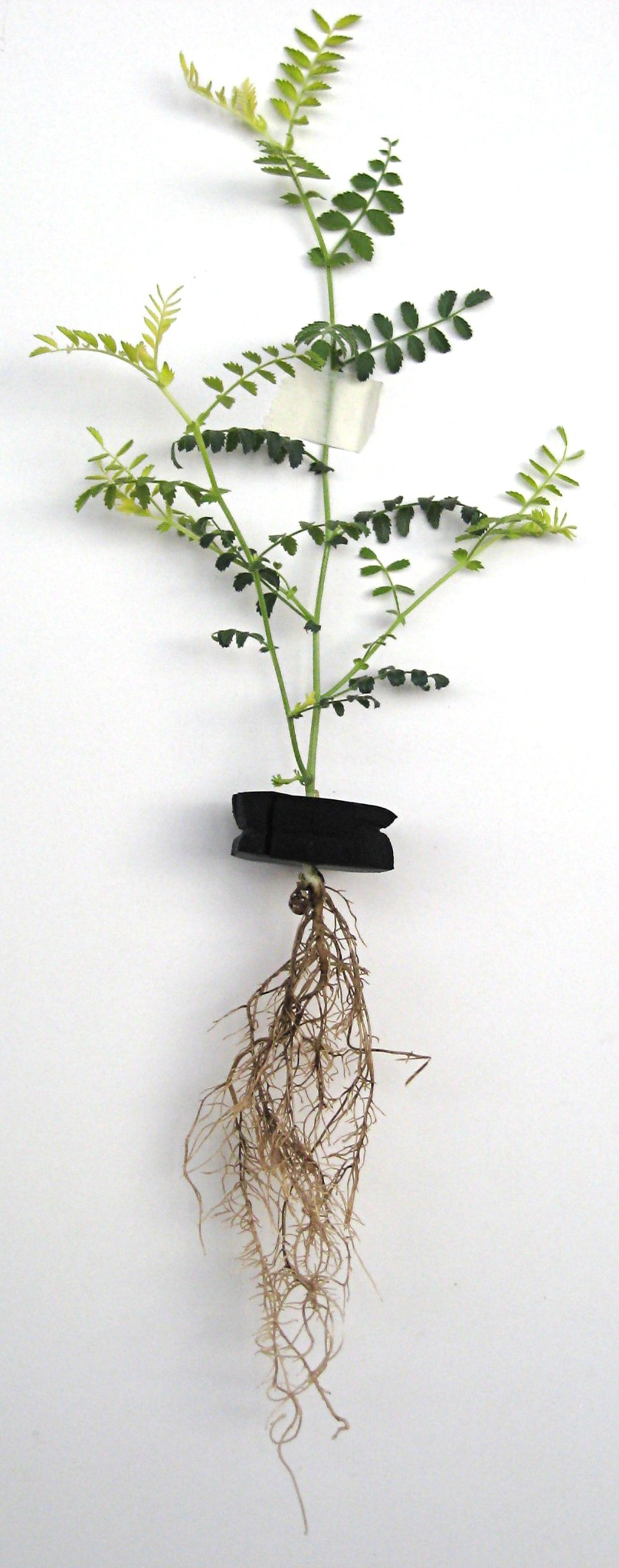
Chickpea plant (Cicer arietinum) with root rot. Note the symptomatic discolouration in some of its leaves.

Root rot is a condition in which anoxic conditions in the soil or potting media around the roots of a plant cause them to rot. This occurs due to excessive standing water around the roots. It is found in both indoor and outdoor plants, although it is more common in indoor plants due to overwatering, heavy potting media, or containers with poor drainage. The leaves of plants experiencing root rot often yellow and die, and if allowed to continue, the condition can be fatal to the plant.

To avoid root rot, it is best to only water plants when the soil becomes dry, and to put the plant in a well-drained pot. Using a dense potting media such as one dug up from outdoors can also cause root rot. Plants from different environments have different tolerances for soil moisture: plants evolved for desert conditions will experience root rot at lower moisture levels than plants evolved for tropical conditions. In both indoor and outdoor plants, it can be lethal and there is no effective treatment, though some plants can be propagated so they will not be lost completely.

Many cases of root rot are caused by members of the water mold genus Phytophthora; perhaps the most aggressive is P. cinnamomi. Spores from root rot causing agents do contaminate other plants, but the rot cannot take hold unless there is adequate moisture. Spores are not only airborne, but are also carried by insects and other arthropods in the soil. It can be controlled by drenching carbendazim.

== Hydroponics ==
Root rot can occur in hydroponic applications if the water is not properly aerated. This is usually accomplished by use of an air pump, air stones, air diffusers and by adjustment of the frequency and length of watering cycles where applicable. Hydroponic air pumps function in much the same way as aquarium pumps, which are used for the same purpose. Root rot and other problems associated with poor water aeration were principal reasons for the development of aeroponics.

== Particular diseases ==
Some particular pathogens infect plants and causes root rot. Such pathogens are listed:

- Armillaria causes Armillaria root rot or white rot root disease
- Phellinius noxius
- Rhododendron root rot
- Shoestring root rot
- Texas root rot
- Rosellinia necatrix aka Dematophora necatrix
- Scytinostroma galactinum aka Corticium galactinum
- Phytophthora – see Phytophthora cinnamomi for discussion on treatment
- Basidiomycete fungi are wide-spread saprophytes and afflicts Acacia plants with root rot.
- Ganoderma spp.
- Phytophthora cinnamomi

== See also ==
- Pythium
- Rhizoctonia
- Plant pathology
- Damping off – root rot in seedlings
