= Dichopleuropus =

Scientific classification
- Domain: Eukaryota
- Kingdom: Fungi
- Division: Basidiomycota
- Class: Agaricomycetes
- Order: Russulales
- Family: Lachnocladiaceae
- Genus: Dichopleuropus; D.A.Reid (1965)

Type species
- Dichopleuropus spathulatus D.A.Reid (1965)

Genus of fungi

Dichopleuropus is a fungal genus in the family Lachnocladiaceae. A monotypic genus, it contains the single species Dichopleuropus spathulatus, found in Malaysia. Dichopleuropus was circumscribed by English mycologist Derek Reid in 1965.
