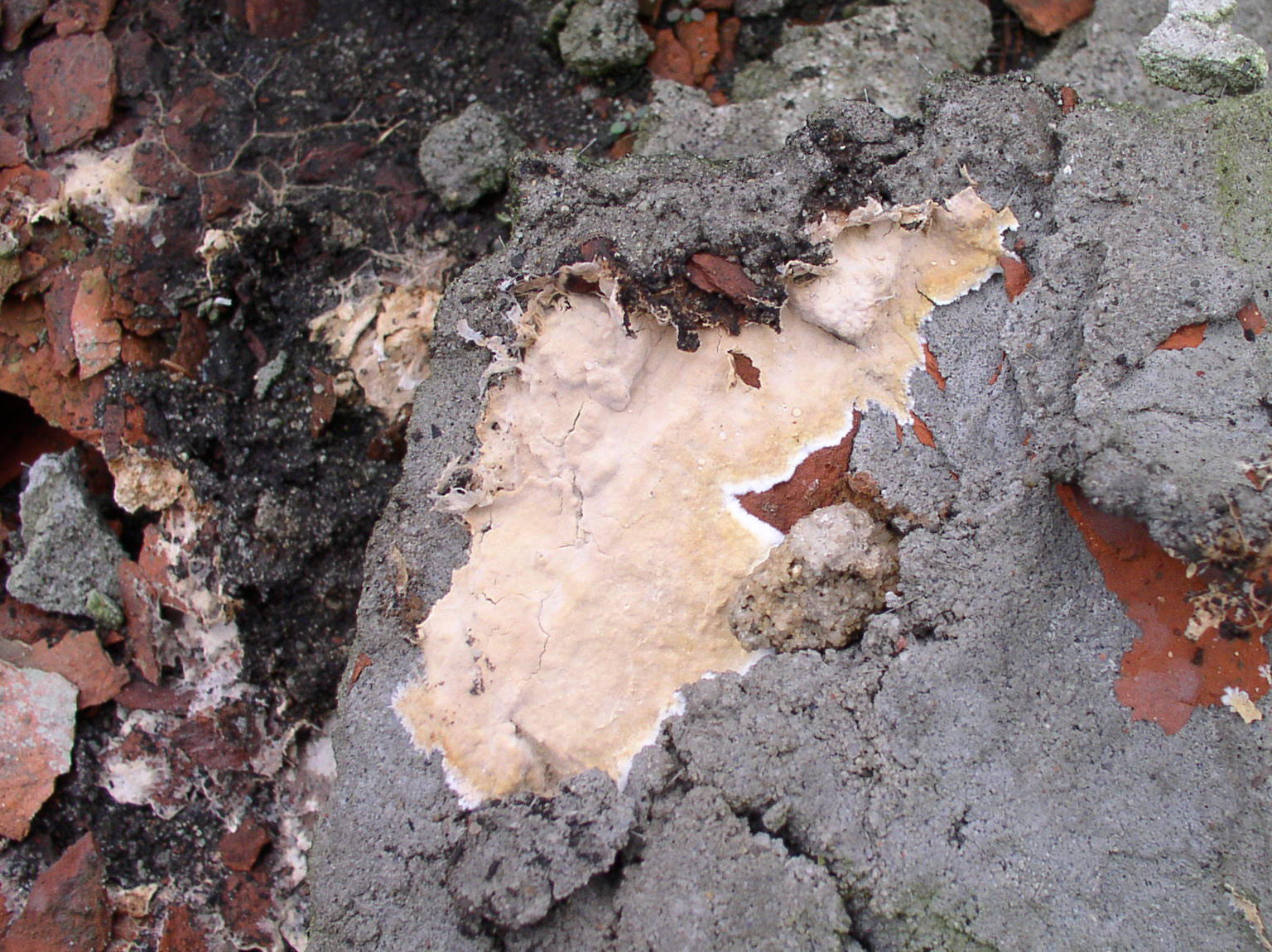
- Asterostroma laxum

Scientific classification
- Kingdom: Fungi
- Division: Basidiomycota
- Class: Agaricomycetes
- Order: Russulales
- Family: Lachnocladiaceae
- Genus: Asterostroma; Massee (1889)

Type species
- Corticium apalum Berk. & Broome (1875)

= Asterostroma =

Genus of fungi

Asterostroma is a genus of fungi in the Peniophoraceae family. The genus contains 26 species, which collectively have a widespread distribution.

== Species ==
1. Asterostroma andinum Pat.
2. Asterostroma apalum (Berk. & Broome) Massee
3. Asterostroma bambusicola S.L. Liu & S.H. He
4. Asterostroma boninense Suhara & N. Maek.
5. Asterostroma bruchii Speg.
6. Asterostroma cervicolor (Berk. & M.A. Curtis) Massee
7. Asterostroma cremeofulvum Parmasto
8. Asterostroma degenerans Bres.
9. Asterostroma echinosporum Boidin, Lanq. & Gilles
10. Asterostroma fulvum Romell
11. Asterostroma gracile Burt
12. Asterostroma indicum A.B. De
13. Asterostroma laxum Bres.
14. Asterostroma macrosporum N. Maek. & Suhara
15. Asterostroma medium Bres.
16. Asterostroma muscicola (Berk. & M.A. Curtis) Massee
17. Asterostroma olivaceum Rick
18. Asterostroma persimile Wakef.
19. Asterostroma praeacutosporum Boidin, Lanq. & Gilles
20. Asterostroma pseudofulvum Parmasto
21. Asterostroma sordidum Rick
22. Asterostroma spiniferum Burt
23. Asterostroma spinososporum Boidin, Lanq. & Gilles
24. Asterostroma stelligerum (Speg.) Speg.
25. Asterostroma vararioides S.L. Liu & S.H. He
26. Asterostroma viridiflavum Rick
