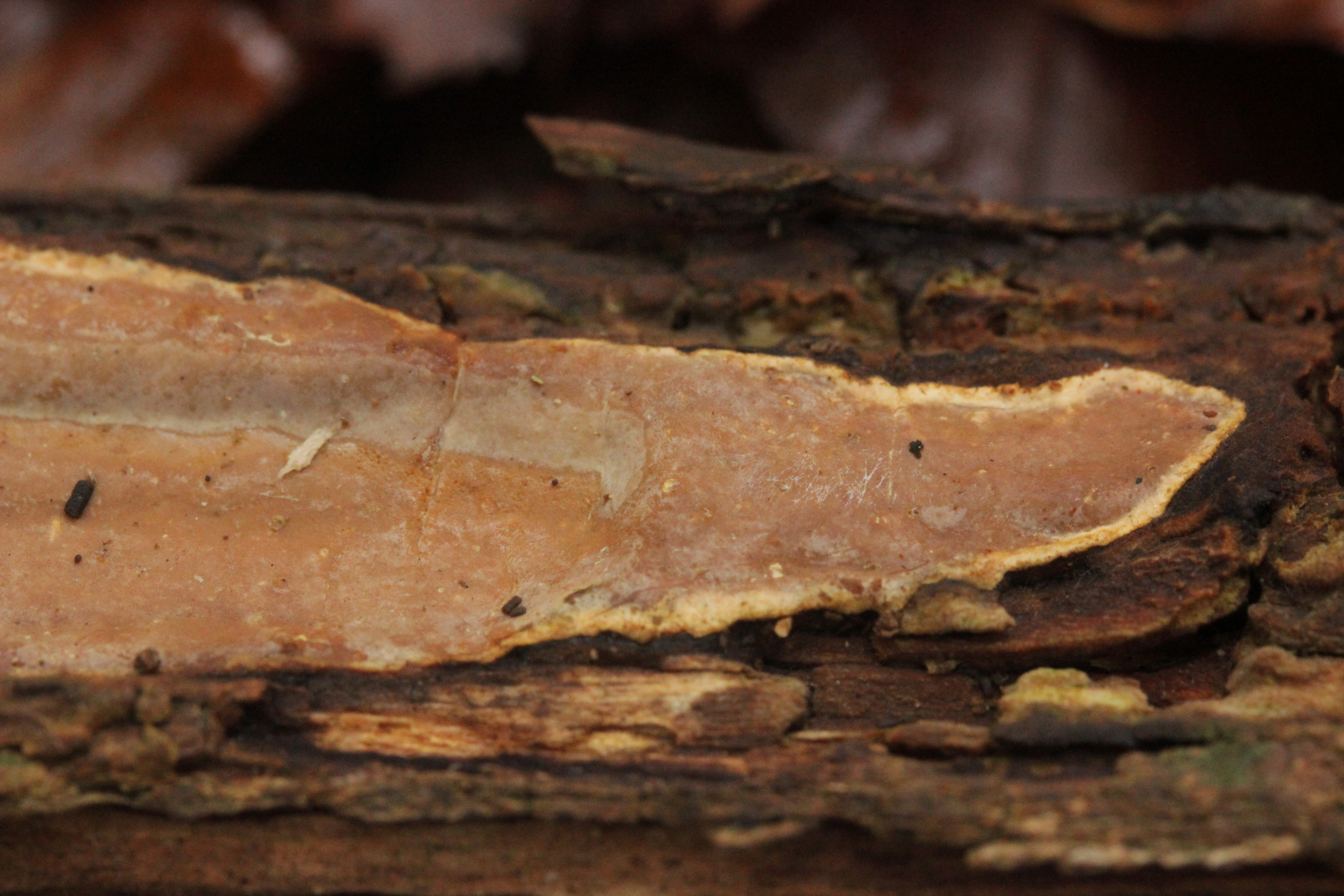

Scientific classification
- Kingdom: Fungi
- Division: Basidiomycota
- Class: Agaricomycetes
- Order: Russulales
- Family: Lachnocladiaceae
- Genus: Scytinostroma
- Species: S. hemidichophyticum

Binomial name
- Scytinostroma hemidichophyticum Pouzar (1966)

= Scytinostroma hemidichophyticum =

Species of fungus

Scytinostroma hemidichophyticum is a mushroom in the family Lachnocladiaceae found in the Czech Republic and Slovakia.
