= Peniophora sacrata =

Scientific classification
- Domain: Eukaryota
- Kingdom: Fungi
- Division: Basidiomycota
- Class: Agaricomycetes
- Order: Russulales
- Family: Peniophoraceae
- Genus: Peniophora
- Species: P. sacrata

Binomial name
- Peniophora sacrata G.Cunn. (1955)

Synonyms
- Phanerochaete sacrata (G.Cunn.) J.B.Taylor (1981); Amylostereum sacratum (G.Cunn.) Burds. (1985); Gloeocystidiellum sacratum (G.Cunn.) Stalpers & P.K.Buchanan (1991); Dextrinocystidium sacratum (G.Cunn.) Sheng H.Wu (1996)

Species of fungus

Peniophora sacrata is a species of fungus in the family Peniophoraceae. A plant pathogen, the fungus causes Peniophora root and stem canker on apple trees.

== See also ==
- List of apple diseases
