= Gloeocystidiopsis =

Scientific classification
- Kingdom: Fungi
- Division: Basidiomycota
- Class: Agaricomycetes
- Order: Russulales
- Family: Peniophoraceae
- Genus: Gloeocystidiopsis; Jülich (1982)

Genus of fungi

Gloeocystidiopsis is a genus of fungi in the Peniophoraceae family. Based on 2025 data, it includes two species:

1. Gloeocystidiopsis cryptacantha (Pat.) E. Larss. & K.H. Larss.
2. Gloeocystidiopsis salmonea (Burt) Boidin, Lanq. & Gilles

The name is coined from the words gloeocystidium ( Ancient Greek γλοιός (gloiós) - having the character of glue, sticky + cystidium < cyst < Late Latin cystis< Ancient Greek κύστις (kústis, “anatomical sac”) + -idium (from Ancient Greek -ίδιον (-ídion, “diminutive”) and -opsis from Ancient Greek ὄψις (ópsis, “aspect, appearance”). Therefore, the word means "having the appearance of a gloeocystidium, i.e. a small gooey cyst".
