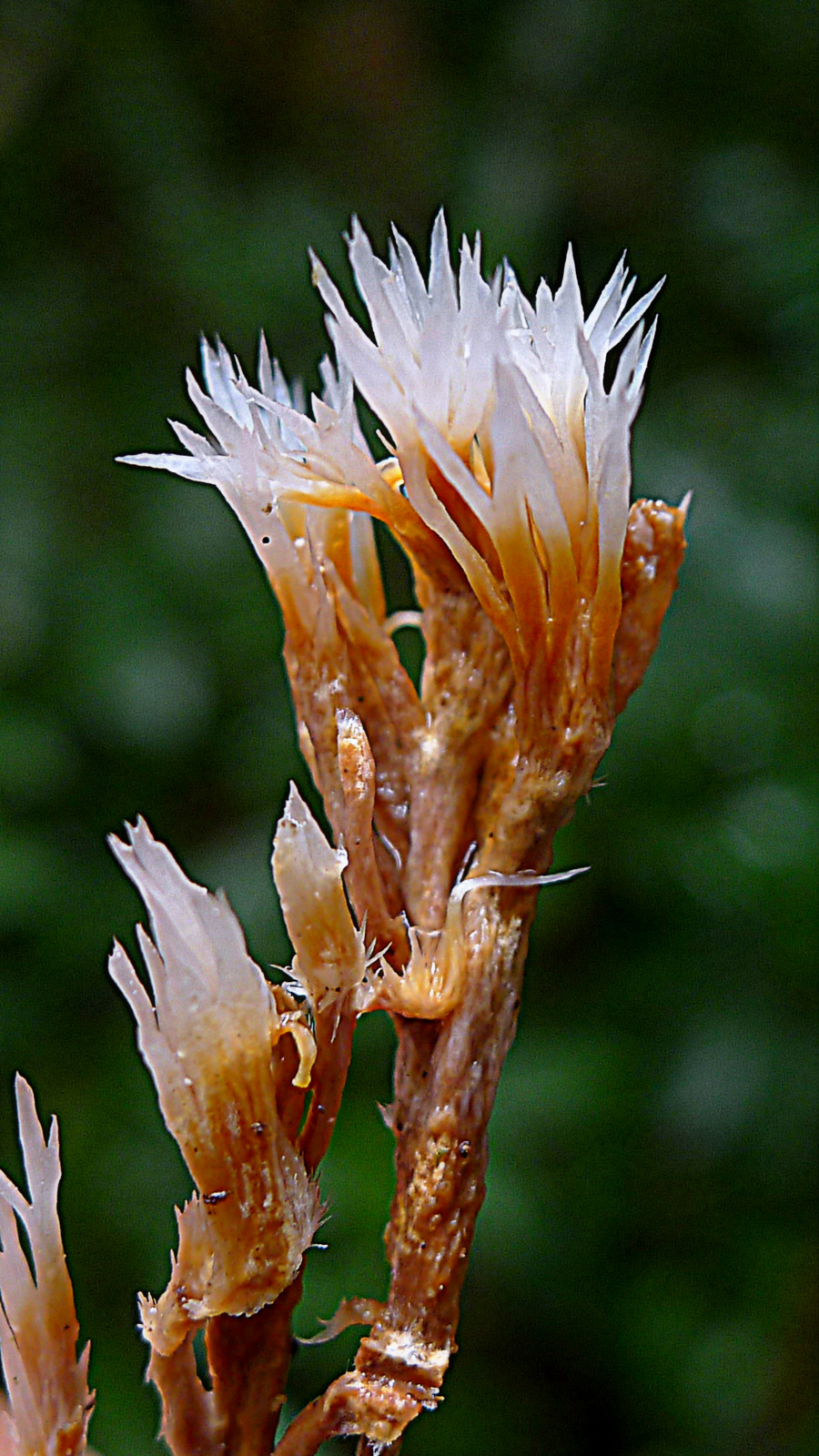
- Lachnocladium schweinfurthianum

Scientific classification
- Kingdom: Fungi
- Division: Basidiomycota
- Class: Agaricomycetes
- Order: Russulales
- Family: Peniophoraceae
- Genus: Lachnocladium; Lév. (1846)

Type species
- Lachnocladium brasiliense (Lév.) Pat. (1902)

Synonyms
- Eriocladus Lév. (1846); Stelligera R.Heim ex Doty (1948)

= Lachnocladium =

Genus of fungi

Lachnocladium is a genus of clavarioid fungi in the family Peniophoraceae . Based on 2025 data, the genus includes 39 species.

== Species ==
- Lachnocladium archeri (Berk.) Lloyd
- Lachnocladium aurantiacum (Berk. & Broome) Petch
- Lachnocladium brasiliense (Lév.) Pat.
- Lachnocladium cervinoalbum Henn.
- Lachnocladium cristatum Lloyd
- Lachnocladium denudatum Corner
- Lachnocladium divaricatum (Berk.) Pat.
- Lachnocladium dubiosum Bres.
- Lachnocladium erectum Burt
- Lachnocladium flavidum Corner
- Lachnocladium fulvum Corner
- Lachnocladium hamatum Henn.
- Lachnocladium hericiiforme Singer
- Lachnocladium hoffmannii Henn.
- Lachnocladium implexum (Lév.) Henn.
- Lachnocladium madeirense Henn.
- Lachnocladium manaosense Henn.
- Lachnocladium molle Corner
- Lachnocladium mussooriense Henn.
- Lachnocladium neglectum Massee
- Lachnocladium pallidum Pat.
- Lachnocladium palmatum Henn.
- Lachnocladium pteruliforme Henn.
- Lachnocladium ramalinoides Henn.
- Lachnocladium samoense Henn.
- Lachnocladium sarasinii Henn.
