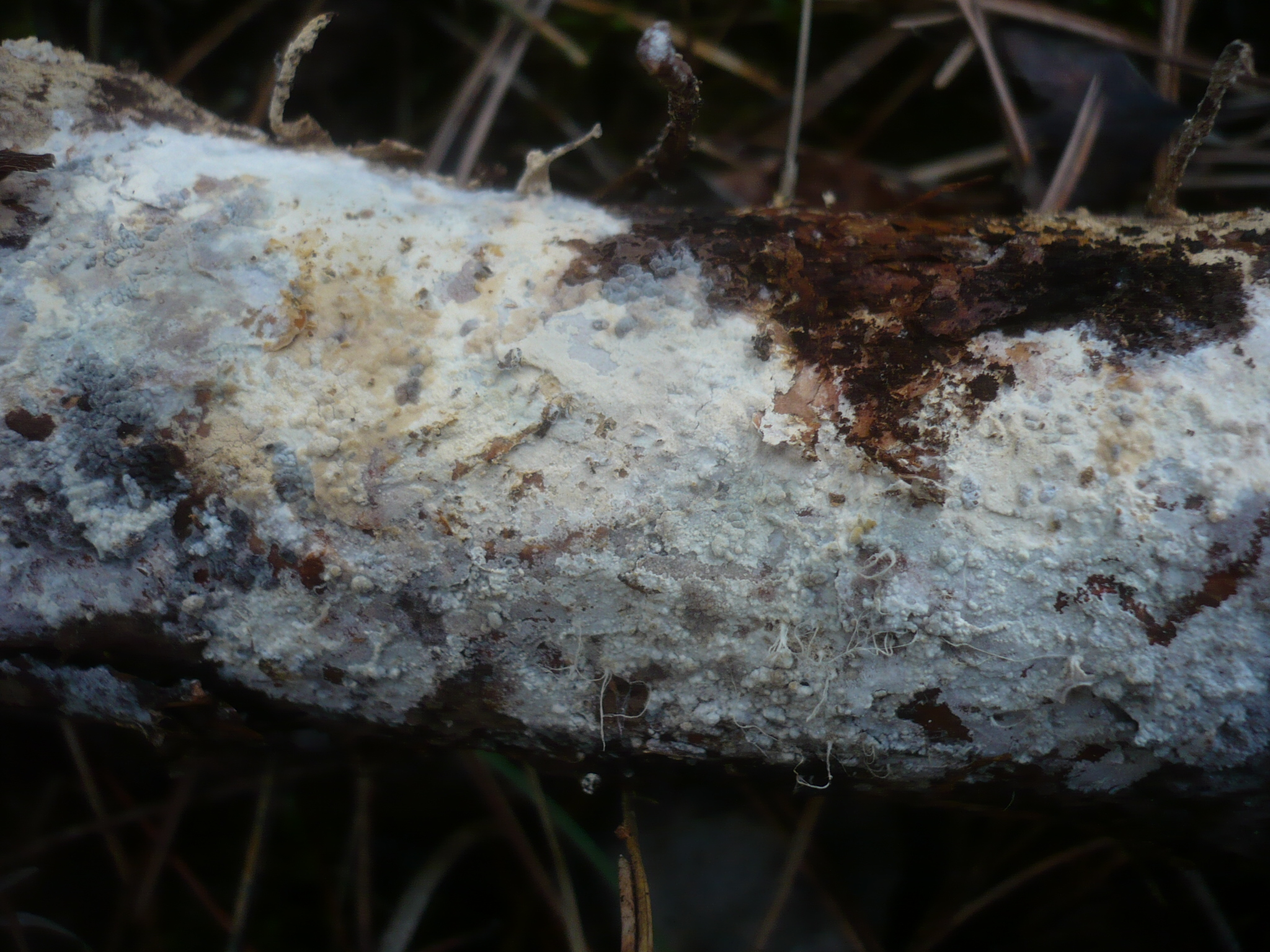
- Vararia ochroleuca

Scientific classification
- Kingdom: Fungi
- Division: Basidiomycota
- Class: Agaricomycetes
- Order: Russulales
- Family: Peniophoraceae
- Genus: Vararia; P.Karst. (1898)

Type species
- Vararia investiens (Schwein.) P.Karst. (1898)

= Vararia =

Genus of fungi

Vararia is a genus of corticioid fungi in the family Peniophoraceae. The genus contains over 50 species that collectively have a widespread distribution.

== Species ==
- Vararia abortiphysa
- Vararia alticola
- Vararia ambigua
- Vararia amphithallica
- Vararia athabascensis
- Vararia aurantiaca
- Vararia breviphysa
- Vararia calami
- Vararia callichroa
- Vararia cinnamomea
- Vararia cremea
- Vararia cremeoavellanea
- Vararia cunninghamii
- Vararia dussii
- Vararia ellipsospora
- Vararia fibra
- Vararia firma
- Vararia fusispora
- Vararia gallica
- Vararia gillesii
- Vararia gittonii
- Vararia gomezii
- Vararia gracilispora
- Vararia hauerslevii
- Vararia incrustata
- Vararia insolita
- Vararia intricata
- Vararia investiens
- Vararia malaysiana
- Vararia maremmana
- Vararia mediospora
- Vararia microphysa
- Vararia minidichophysa
- Vararia minispora
- Vararia ochroleuca
- Vararia parmastoi
- Vararia pectinata
- Vararia perplexa
- Vararia phyllophila
- Vararia pirispora
- Vararia protrusa
- Vararia racemosa
- Vararia rhombospora
- Vararia rosulenta
- Vararia rugosispora
- Vararia sigmatospora
- Vararia sphaericospora
- Vararia splendida
- Vararia thujae
- Vararia trinidadensis
- Vararia tropica
- Vararia ubatubensis
- Vararia longicystidiata
- Vararia vassilievae
- Vararia verrucosa
