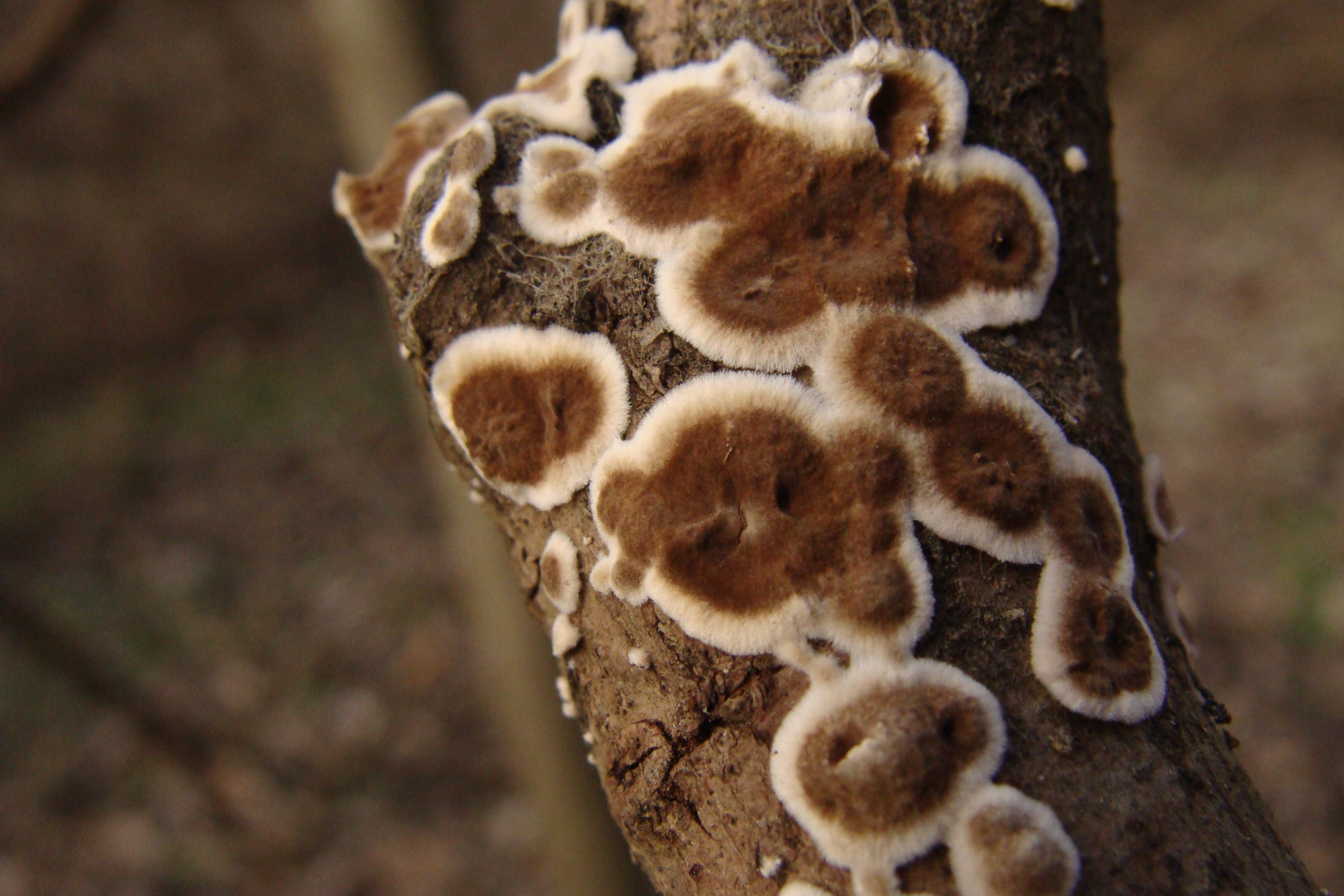

Scientific classification
- Domain: Eukaryota
- Kingdom: Fungi
- Division: Basidiomycota
- Class: Agaricomycetes
- Order: Russulales
- Family: Peniophoraceae
- Genus: Peniophora
- Species: P. albobadia

Binomial name
- Peniophora albobadia (Schwein.) Boidin (1961)

Synonyms
- Thelephora albobadia Schwein. (1822); Stereum albobadium (Schwein.) Fr. (1838); Thelephora albomarginata Schwein. (1847); Hymenochaete paupercula Berk. & M.A.Curtis (1868); Stereum coffearum Berk. & M.A.Curtis (1868); Stereum bizonatum Berk. & M.A.Curtis (1873); Corticium rosellum Speg. (1880); Peniophora paupercula (Berk. & M.A.Curtis) Cooke (1880); Peniophora albomarginata (Schwein.) Massee (1889); Corticium pauperculum (Berk. & M.A.Curtis) Berk. & M.A.Curtis (1890); Terana rosella (Speg.) Kuntze (1891); Lloydella albobadia (Schwein.) Höhn. & Litsch. (1907); Lloydella coffearum (Berk. & M.A.Curtis) Höhn. & Litsch. (1907); Stereum heterosporum Burt (1920); Lopharia heterospora (Burt) D.A.Reid (1969); Peniophora heterospora (Burt) Boidin & Lanq. (1974); Dendrophora albobadia (Schwein.) Chamuris (1987)

= Peniophora albobadia =

Species of fungus

Peniophora albobadia is a species of crust fungus in the family Peniophoraceae.

== Taxonomy ==
First described scientifically by Lewis David de Schweinitz in 1822, it was transferred to the genus Peniophora by Jacques Boidin in 1961. It is commonly found in the United States.

=== Etymology ===
The species epithet is derived from albo-, white, and badi- meaning reddish-brown, the epithet accurately describing the vivid contrast between the fertile area and the margin.

The common name, giraffe spots, was coined by a member of the New York Mycological Society, based on specimens found during surveys of the boroughs of New York City.

== Description ==
The fruiting body is 1–12 centimetres (1/2–4 1/2 in) across, with brown zones in the center and a fuzzy white margin.

=== Similar species ===
A similar-looking species Duportella malenconii has brown caps that peel away. There are few other lookalikes in North America.

== Ecology ==
It is a saprobic fungus, forming spreading crusts on the bark of decaying twigs and fallen branches of many hardwood species.
