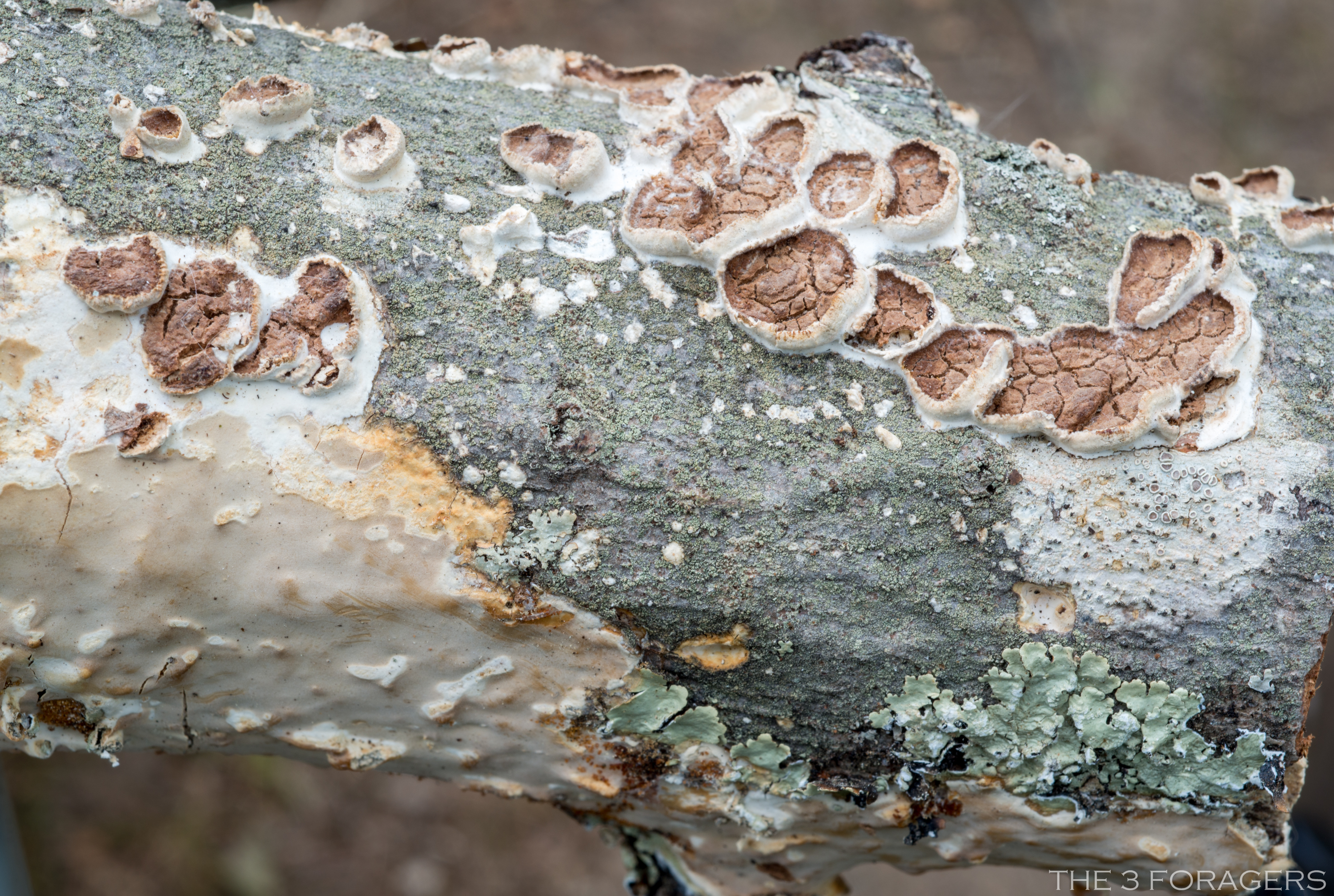
- Licrostroma subgiganteum

Scientific classification
- Kingdom: Fungi
- Division: Basidiomycota
- Class: Agaricomycetes
- Order: Corticiales
- Family: Corticiaceae
- Genus: Licrostroma; P.A. Lemke

Type species
- Licrostroma subgiganteum (Berk.) P.A. Lemke

Synonyms
- Aleurodiscus subgiganteus (Berk.) Höhn. Corticium subgiganteum Berk. Peniophora subgigantea (Berk.) Massee; Terana subgigantea (Berk.) Kuntze

= Licrostroma =

Genus of fungi

Licrostroma is a genus of fungi in the family Corticiaceae. The genus is monotypic, containing the single species Licrostroma subgiganteum found in North America and Japan. It is an anamorphic form of Michenera.
