= Amylofungus =

Scientific classification
- Kingdom: Fungi
- Division: Basidiomycota
- Class: Agaricomycetes
- Order: Russulales
- Family: Peniophoraceae
- Genus: Amylofungus; Sheng H. Wu

Type species
- Amylofungus corrosus (G. Cunn.) Sheng H. Wu

Genus of fungi

Amylofungus is a genus of fungi in the Peniophoraceae family. Based on 2025 data, it includes 2 species:

- Amylofungus corrosus (G. Cunn.) Sheng H. Wu
- Amylofungus globosporus (N. Maek.) Sheng H. Wu
