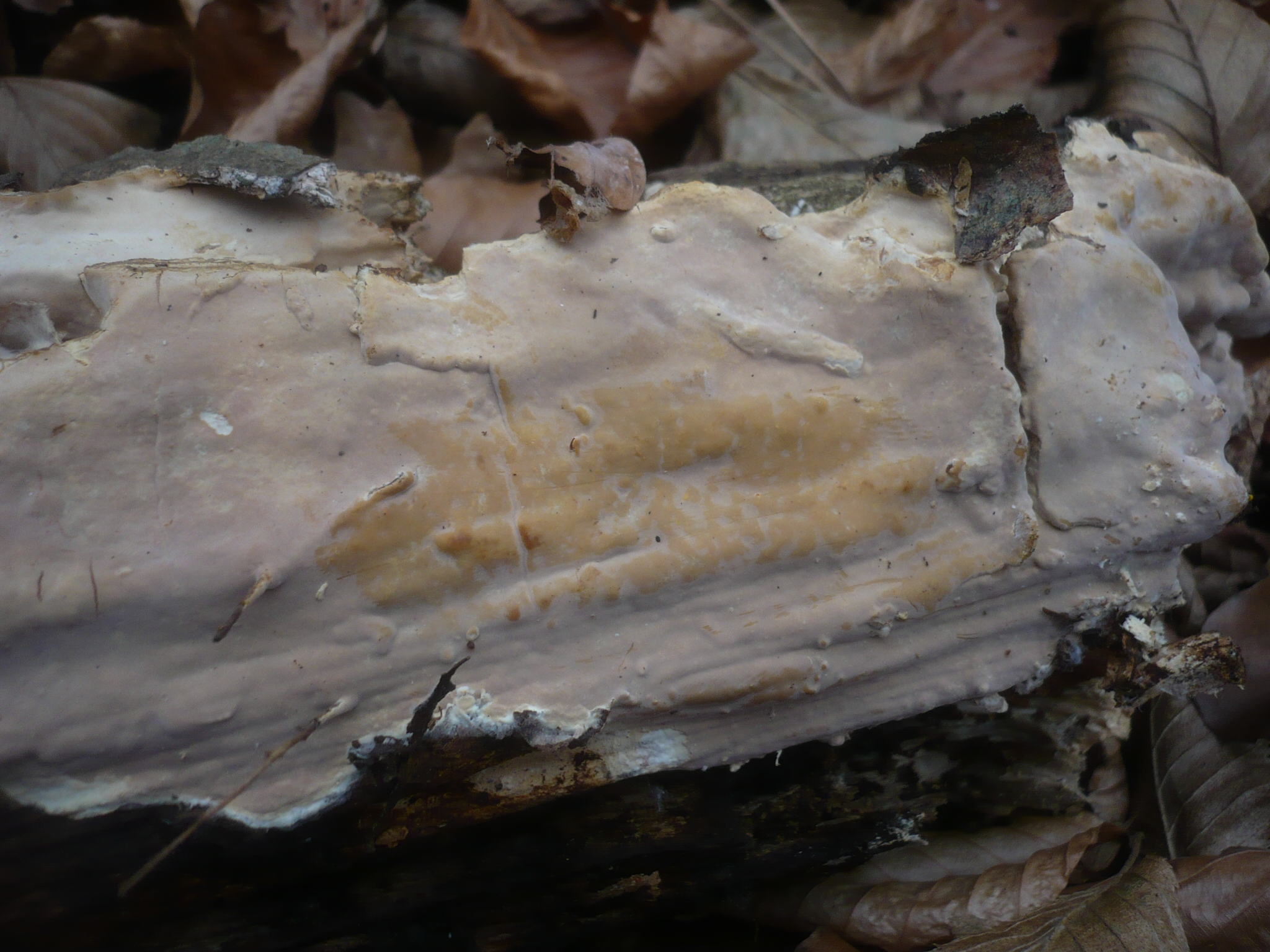
- Scytinostroma portentosum

Scientific classification
- Domain: Eukaryota
- Kingdom: Fungi
- Division: Basidiomycota
- Class: Agaricomycetes
- Order: Russulales
- Family: Lachnocladiaceae
- Genus: Scytinostroma; Donk (1956)

Type species
- Scytinostroma portentosum (Berk. & M.A.Curtis) Donk (1873)

Species
- 32, see text

= Scytinostroma =

Genus of fungi

Scytinostroma is a genus of fungi in the Lachnocladiaceae family. The genus contains 32 species that collectively have a widespread distribution. The genus was circumscribed by mycologist Marinus Anton Donk in 1956.

== Species ==
- Scytinostroma africanogalactinum
- Scytinostroma ahmadii
- Scytinostroma albocinctum
- Scytinostroma alutum
- Scytinostroma arachnoideum
- Scytinostroma caudisporum
- Scytinostroma corneri
- Scytinostroma crassum
- Scytinostroma crispulum
- Scytinostroma cystidiatum
- Scytinostroma decidens
- Scytinostroma duriusculum
- Scytinostroma fulvum
- Scytinostroma galactinum
- Scytinostroma hemidichophyticum
- Scytinostroma intextum
- Scytinostroma jacksonii
- Scytinostroma luteolum
- Scytinostroma mediterraneense
- Scytinostroma microspermum
- Scytinostroma neogalactinum
- Scytinostroma ochroleucum
- Scytinostroma odoratum
- Scytinostroma parvisporum
- Scytinostroma phaeosarcum
- Scytinostroma portentosum
- Scytinostroma praestans
- Scytinostroma protrusum
- Scytinostroma pseudopraestans
- Scytinostroma pulverulentum
- Scytinostroma renisporum
- Scytinostroma rhizomorpharum
