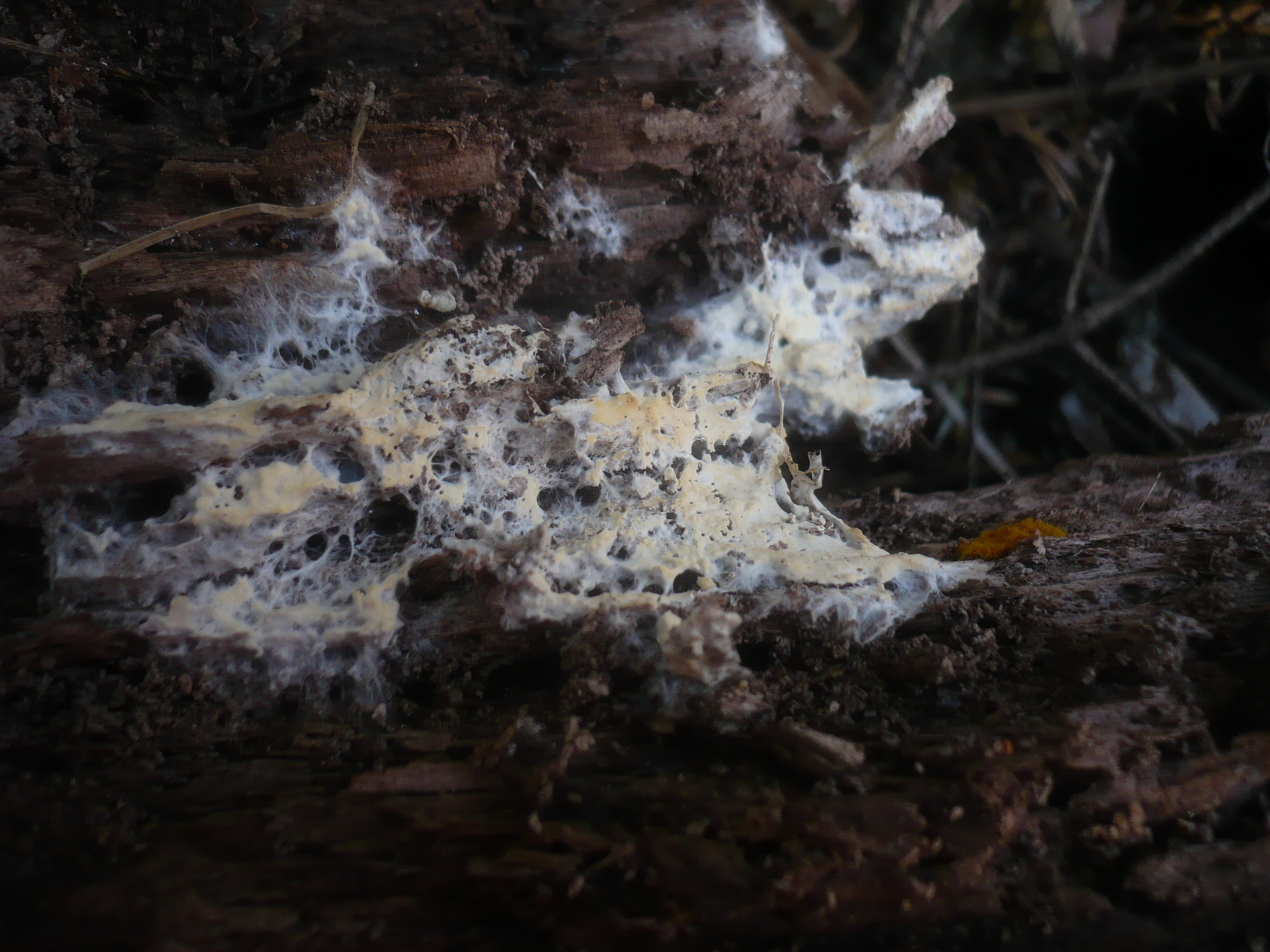
- Gloiothele lactescens

Scientific classification
- Kingdom: Fungi
- Division: Basidiomycota
- Class: Agaricomycetes
- Order: Russulales
- Family: Peniophoraceae
- Genus: Gloiothele; Bres. (1920)

Type species
- Gloiothele lamellosa (Henn.) Bres. (1920)

Species
- G. citrina G. citrinoidea G. globosa G. granulosa G. humilis G. lactescens G. lamellosa G. torrendii G.ventricosa

Synonyms
- Gloeocystidiopsis Jülich (1982); Vesiculomyces E.Hagstr. (1977)

= Gloiothele =

Genus of fungi

Gloiothele is a genus of fungi in the Peniophoraceae family. The genus was circumscribed by mycologist Giacomo Bresadola in 1920.
