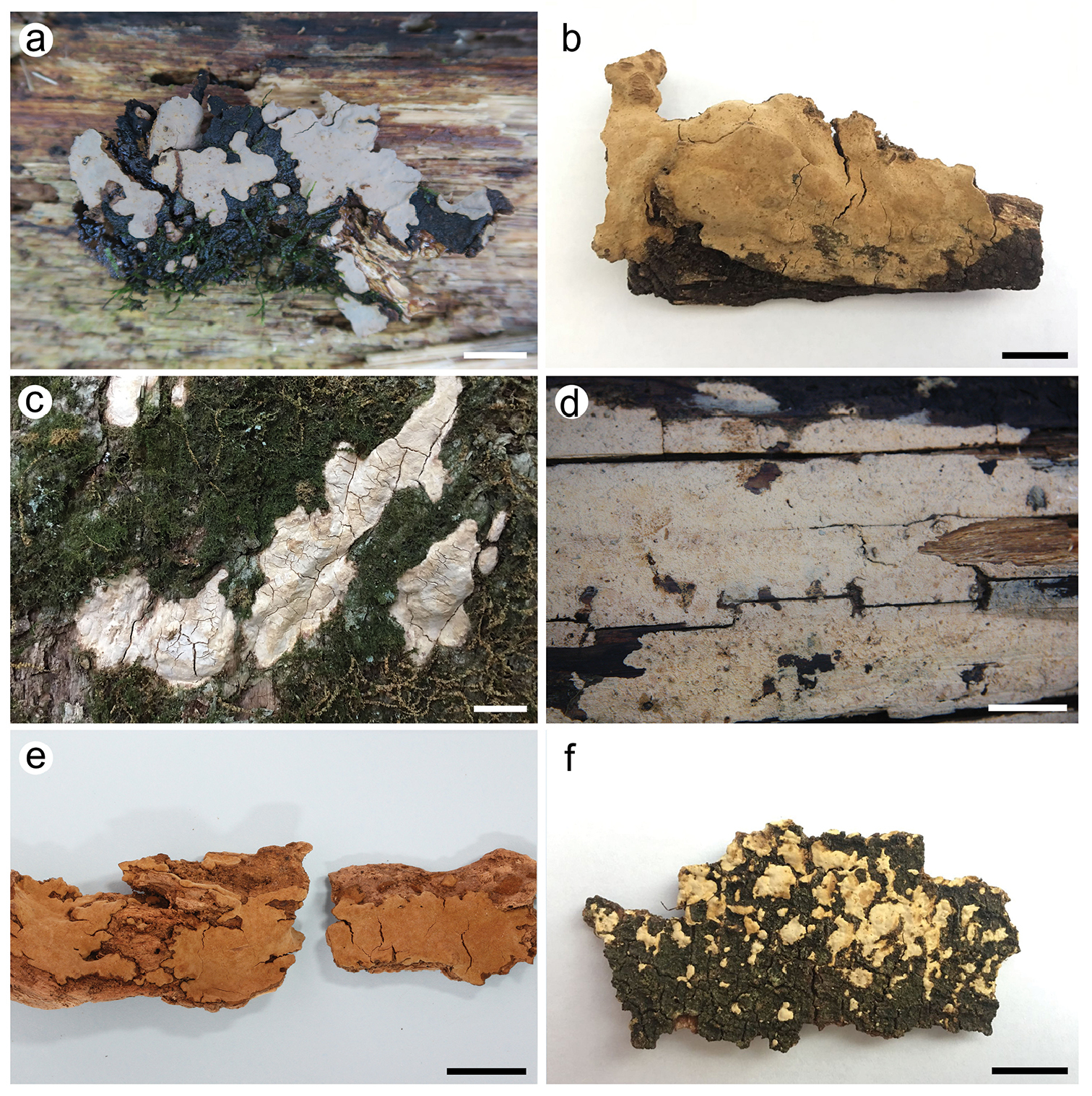
- Various species of Dichostereum

Scientific classification
- Kingdom: Fungi
- Division: Basidiomycota
- Class: Agaricomycetes
- Order: Russulales
- Family: Peniophoraceae
- Genus: Dichostereum; Pilát (1926)

Type species
- Dichostereum durum (Bourdot & Galzin) Pilát (1926)

= Dichostereum =

Genus of fungi

Dichostereum is a genus of corticioid fungi in the Peniophoraceae family. Based on 2025 data, the genus contains 14 species that have a widespread distribution.

The name was coined with the use of the ancient Greek words δῐ́χᾰ (dĭ́khă, “in two”) + στερεόν (stereón) <στερεός (stereós, “firm; rigid; solid”).

== Species ==
1. Dichostereum austrosinense S.H. He & S.L. Liu
2. Dichostereum boidinii S.H. He & S.L. Liu
3. Dichostereum boreale (Pouzar) Ginns & M.N.L. Lefebvre
4. Dichostereum durum (Bourdot & Galzin) Pilát
5. Dichostereum eburneum S.H. He & S.L. Liu
6. Dichostereum effuscatum (Cooke & Ellis) Boidin & Lanq.
7. Dichostereum induratum (Berk.) Pilát
8. Dichostereum kenyense Boidin & Lanq.
9. Dichostereum orientale Boidin & Lanq.
10. Dichostereum pallescens (Schwein.) Boidin & Lanq.
11. Dichostereum peniophoroides (Burt) Boidin & Lanq.
12. Dichostereum ramulosum (Boidin & Lanq.) Boidin & Lanq.
13. Dichostereum rhodosporum (Wakef.) Boidin & Lanq.
14. Dichostereum sordulentum (Cooke & Massee) Boidin & Lanq.
