= Scytinostroma galactinum =

Scientific classification
- Kingdom: Fungi
- Division: Basidiomycota
- Class: Agaricomycetes
- Order: Russulales
- Family: Lachnocladiaceae
- Genus: Scytinostroma
- Species: S. galactinum

Binomial name
- Scytinostroma galactinum (Fr.) Donk, (1956)

Synonyms
- Corticium alneum Corticium galactinum Corticium odoratum var. alni Phanerochaete alnea Phanerochaete velutina var. alnea Scytinostroma eurasiaticogalactinum Stereum alneum Stereum suaveolens Thelephora alnea Thelephora galactina Thelephora suaveolens Xerocarpus suaveolens

Species of fungus

Scytinostroma galactinum is a fungal plant pathogen infecting apples.
