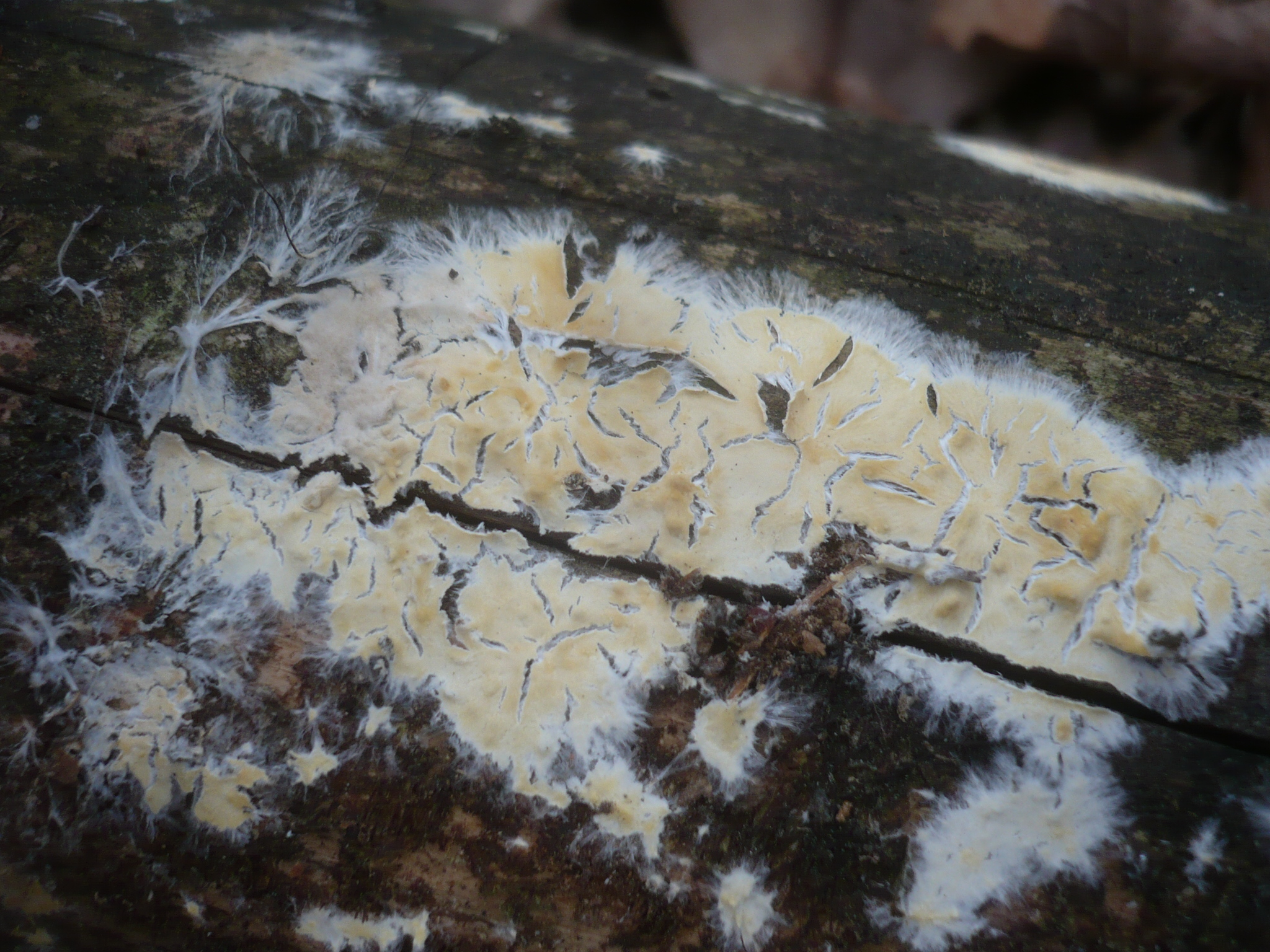
- Vesiculomyces citrinus

Scientific classification
- Kingdom: Fungi
- Division: Basidiomycota
- Class: Agaricomycetes
- Order: Russulales
- Family: Peniophoraceae
- Genus: Vesiculomyces; E.Hagstr. (1977)

Type species
- Vesiculomyces citrinus (Pers.) E.Hagstr.

= Vesiculomyces =

Genus of fungi

Vesiculomyces is a genus of fungi in the Peniophoraceae family.
