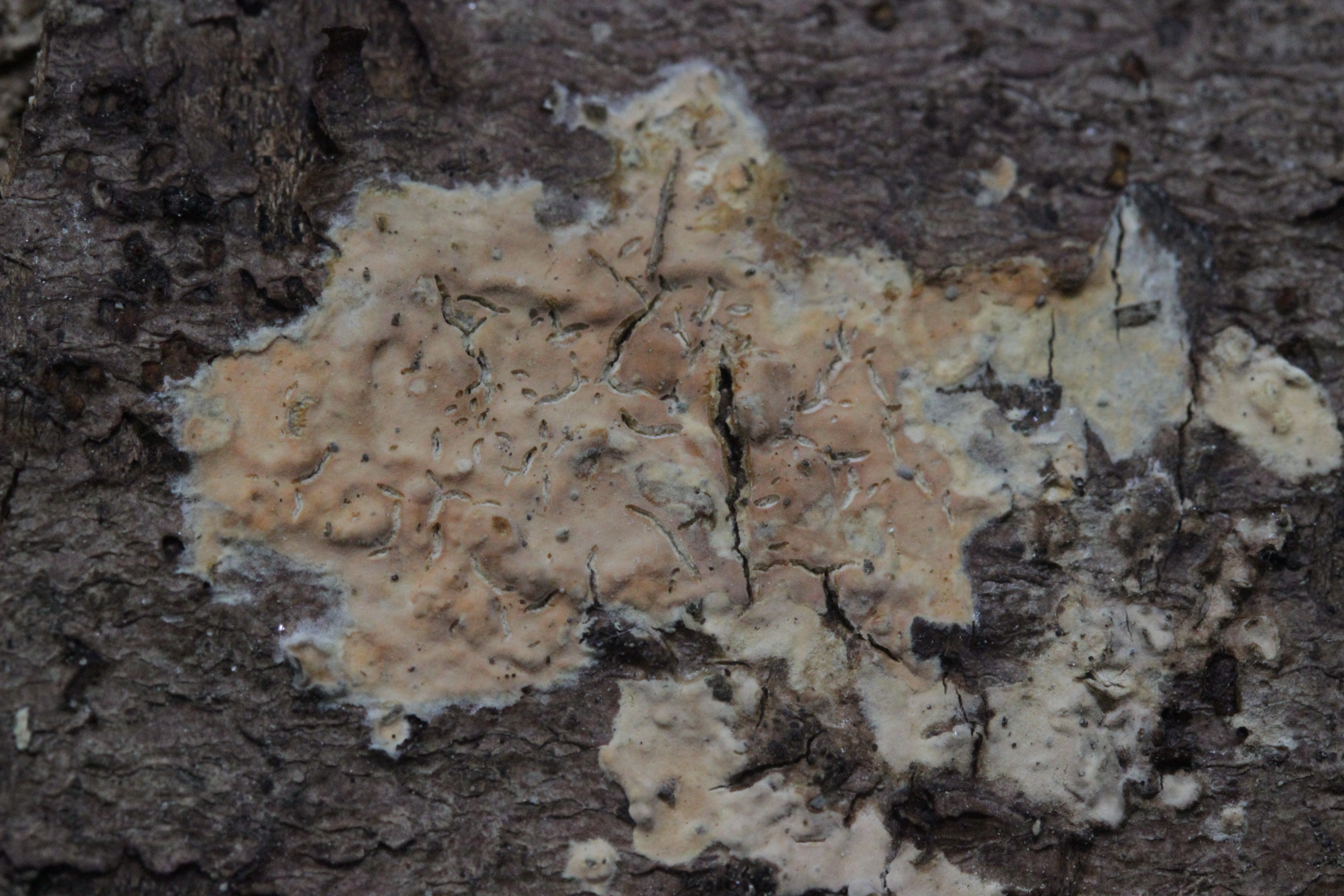
- Peniophora incarnata

Scientific classification
- Domain: Eukaryota
- Kingdom: Fungi
- Division: Basidiomycota
- Class: Agaricomycetes
- Order: Russulales
- Family: Peniophoraceae
- Genus: Peniophora
- Species: P. incarnata

Binomial name
- Peniophora incarnata (Pers. ex. Fr.)

= Peniophora incarnata =

Species of fungus

Peniophora incarnata, the rosy crust fungus, is a species of Basidiomycotal fungus in the order Russulales and family Peniophoraceae. It is a resupinate, or crust-like species, that grows on the surface of bark. In Scandinavia it grows on a range of deciduous hosts and less often on coniferous trees.

== Description ==
The fruit bodies of P. incarnata are resupinate, adnate and membranous, up to 200 μm thick. They start as small colonies but these may later coalesce. The hymenial surface is orange or red to reddish-brown, smooth, continuous and uncracked; the margin is thinner, curled and white or pale orange or red. The base of the fruit body is composed of brown hyphae, with clamp connections, and moderately thick cell walls, measuring 3.2 to 4.5 μm in width. The basidiospores are cylindrical.

== Ecology ==
Peniophora incarnata is sometimes parasitised by the yellow brain fungus (Tremella mesenterica).
