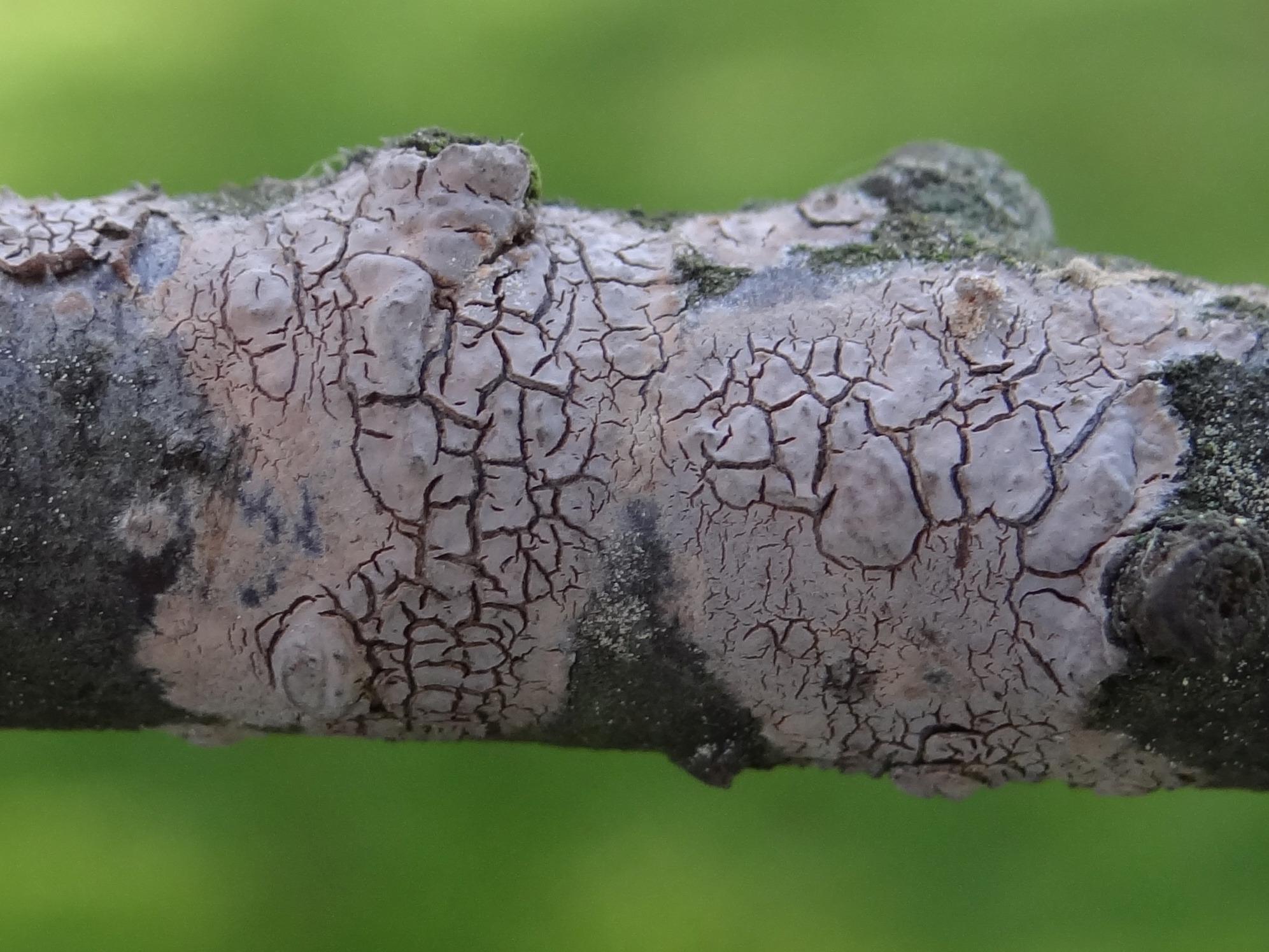
- Peniophora cinerea found on Cerasus avium in Poland

Scientific classification
- Domain: Eukaryota
- Kingdom: Fungi
- Division: Basidiomycota
- Class: Agaricomycetes
- Order: Russulales
- Family: Peniophoraceae
- Genus: Peniophora
- Species: P. cinerea

Binomial name
- Peniophora cinerea (Pers.) Cooke (1879)

Synonyms
- Corticium cinereum Pers. (1794); Corticium obscurum (Pers.) Fr. (1874); Kneiffia cinerea (Pers.) Bres. (1903); Peniophora obscura (Pers.) Bres. (1897); Stereum tumulosum (P.Karst.) Sacc. (1888); Terana obscura (Pers.) Kuntze (1891); Thelephora cinerea (Pers.) Pers. (1801); Thelephora obscura Pers. (1822); Xylobolus tumulosus P.Karst. (1881)

= Peniophora cinerea =

Species of fungus

Peniophora cinerea is a species of fungus in the family Peniophoraceae. It is a plant pathogen infecting black walnut (Juglans nigra).

It was first described as a species of Corticium by Christiaan Hendrik Persoon in 1797. Mordecai Cubitt Cooke transferred it to Peniophora in 1879.

It is found in Asia and North America.

== See also ==
- List of black walnut diseases
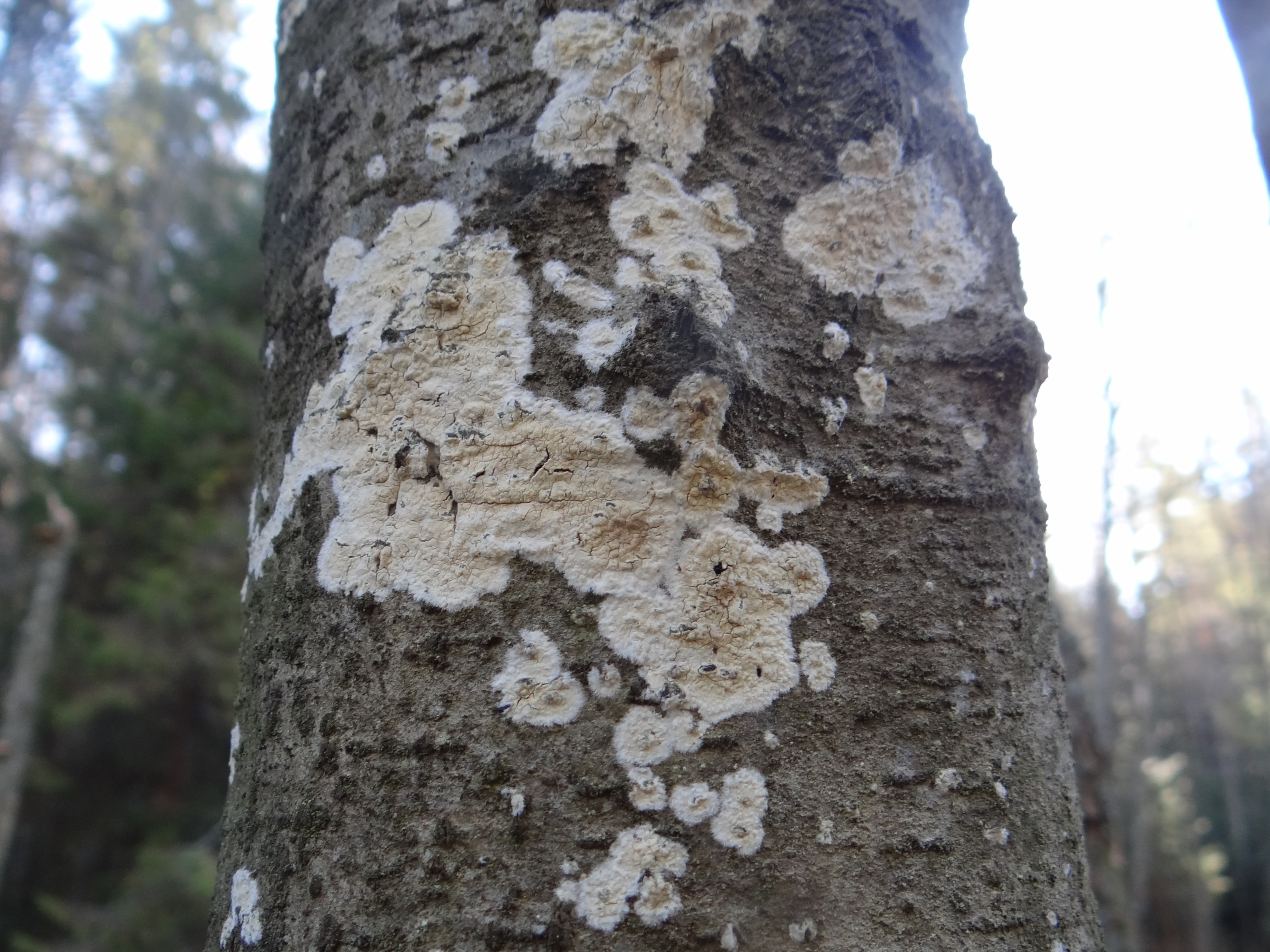
- Alnus incana trunk with Peniophora cinerea
