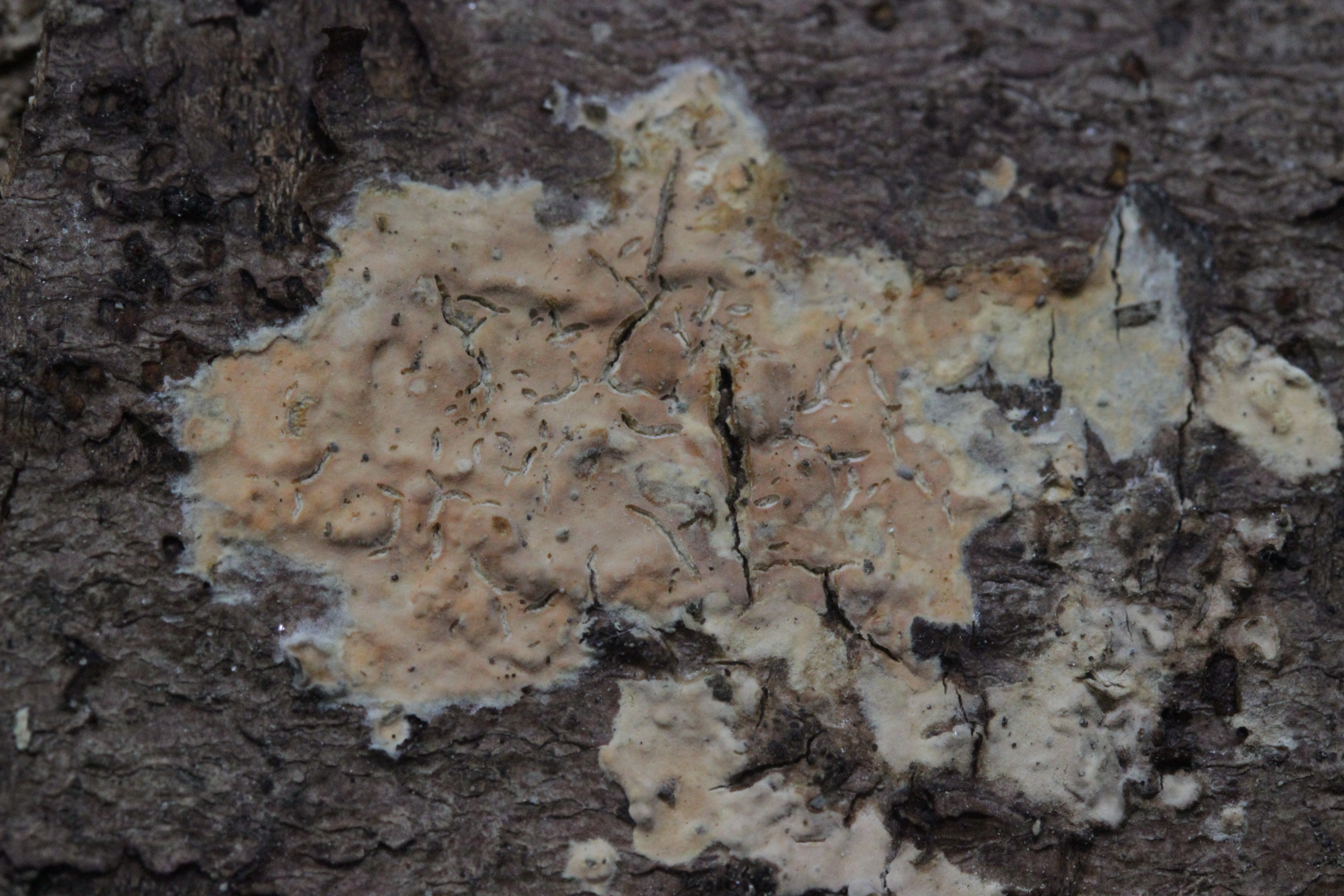
- Peniophora incarnata

Scientific classification
- Domain: Eukaryota
- Kingdom: Fungi
- Division: Basidiomycota
- Class: Agaricomycetes
- Order: Russulales
- Family: Peniophoraceae
- Genus: Peniophora; Cooke

Type species
- Peniophora quercina (Pers.) Cooke

= Peniophora =

Genus of fungi

Peniophora is a genus of fungi which are plant pathogens. Members of the genus belong to the class Agaricomycetes, order Russulales, and family Peniophoraceae. The genus is widespread, and contains 62 species. The species of Peniophora are resupinate, or crust-like, and are described as corticioid. A number of its members are parasitised by other fungi. For example, Tremella mesenterica is a parasite to several species of Peniophora.

== Taxonomy and classification ==
The genus was first described by Mordecai Cubitt Cooke in 1879. The type species is Peniophora quercina, initially named Thelephora quercina by Christian Hendrik Persoon in 1801 before being transferred to Peniophora by Cooke in 1879. However, this species was also chosen as the type species for the genus Corticium as defined by Persoon in 1794. Until 1981 the starting point for the nomenclature of the corticioid fungi was the publication of Fries' first volume of the Systema mycologicum, which was set at January 1, 1821. Corticium Persoon (1794) was therefore a devalidated name because it was published before the starting point. Mycologists of the later 19th and 20th centuries, including Patouillard (1900), Burt (1914–26), and Bourdot and Galzin (1928) distinguished species of Peniophora Cooke by their hymenial cystidia from species of Corticium Persoon, which lacked them. Despite being synonyms under the International Code of Botanical Nomenclature (ICBN), Corticium and Peniophore were used in this encompassing sense well into the 20th century. Changes made to the ICBN in 1981 included moving the starting point date for fungi back to May 1, 1753, the publication date of Linnaeus' Species plantarum. Names published between 1753 and 1821 (including Corticium) are now considered valid.

When Cooke described Peniophora, he incorporated many crustlike species whose fruit bodies possess in the hymenium sterile, hair-like structures termed cystidia. Subsequent investigators, such as Bresadola and Burt accepted and expanded upon Cooke's concept of the genus, placing in it nearly all corticiaceous species that produced cystidia. Often, other taxonomically significant characters were not fully considered, and as a result, Peniophora soon became a heterogeneous assemblage of species. A number of morphological studies were carried out in the 20th century to better characterize the genus. Bourdot and Galzin (1912, 1928) were among the first investigators to recognize that certain species within the genus had more distinct affinities with each other than with other members of the genus. This prompted them to divide the genus into sections and groups of seemingly morphologically related species, such as the sections Coloratae and Membranaceae. Later, several species of the section Membranaceae would be transferred into the genus Phanerochaete. Later attempts to refine the infrageneric classification of Peniophora included morphology, physiology, development, cytogenetics, cytology and biochemistry.

== Partial list of species ==
Selected species, for a complete list see List of Peniophora species:

- Peniophora albobadia
- Peniophora cinerea
- Peniophora incarnata
- Peniophora quercina
- Peniophora sacrata
