= Michenera =

Scientific classification
- Kingdom: Fungi
- Division: Basidiomycota
- Class: Agaricomycetes
- Order: Corticiales
- Family: Corticiaceae
- Genus: Michenera; Berk. & M.A. Curtis

Type species
- Michenera artocreas Berk. & M.A. Curtis

Species
- M. artocreas M. poroniaeformis M. rompelii M. incrustat

Genus of fungi

Michenera is a genus of fungi in the family Corticiaceae. The genus contains four species found in pantropical regions.

The genus name of Michenera is in honour of Ezra Michener (1794-1887), who was an American teacher, botanist (Mycology and Lichenology).
