= Resupination =

Botanical term

Resupination is derived from the Latin word resupinus, meaning "bent back with the face upward" or "on the back". "Resupination" is the noun form of the adjective "resupine" which means "being upside-down, supine or facing upward".

The word "resupinate" is generally only used in a botanical context – in everyday language, "supine" has a similar meaning. In botany, resupination refers to the "twisting" of flowers or leaves through about 180° as they open. Resupinate leaves have the petiole or "stalk" twisted - resupinate flowers twist as they open.

== Botanical examples ==
=== Alstroemeriaceae ===
Plants in the genus Alstroemeria have more or less resupinate leaves.

=== Orchidaceae ===
The flower of a typical plant in the orchid family Orchidaceae has three sepals and three petals. One petal, called the labellum, "lip" or "tongue", is typically quite different from the other two. It usually functions to attract an insect pollinator. As an orchid flower bud develops, the attachment of the lip to the axis of the flower is above that of the other two petals. In many orchid genera, as the flower opens, it twists so that the attachment of the "lip" is below that of the other two petals, the three sepals and the sexual parts of the flower known as the column. Orchid flowers that undergo this twist are called "resupinate" – those that do not are "non-resupinate".

Although Charles Darwin did not use the term "resupination", he suggested that having the labellum on the lower part of the flower aids pollination by providing a landing place for visiting insects. However, the South American bee Euglossa cordata pollinates both resupinate and non-resupinate orchid flowers. It has also been suggested that resupination exposes the labellum to sunlight, emphasizing patterns and nectar guides and increases the temperature and thus the vaporisation of floral scents.

Three Australian genera with non-resupinate flowers are Prasophyllum, Cryptostylis and Caleana.

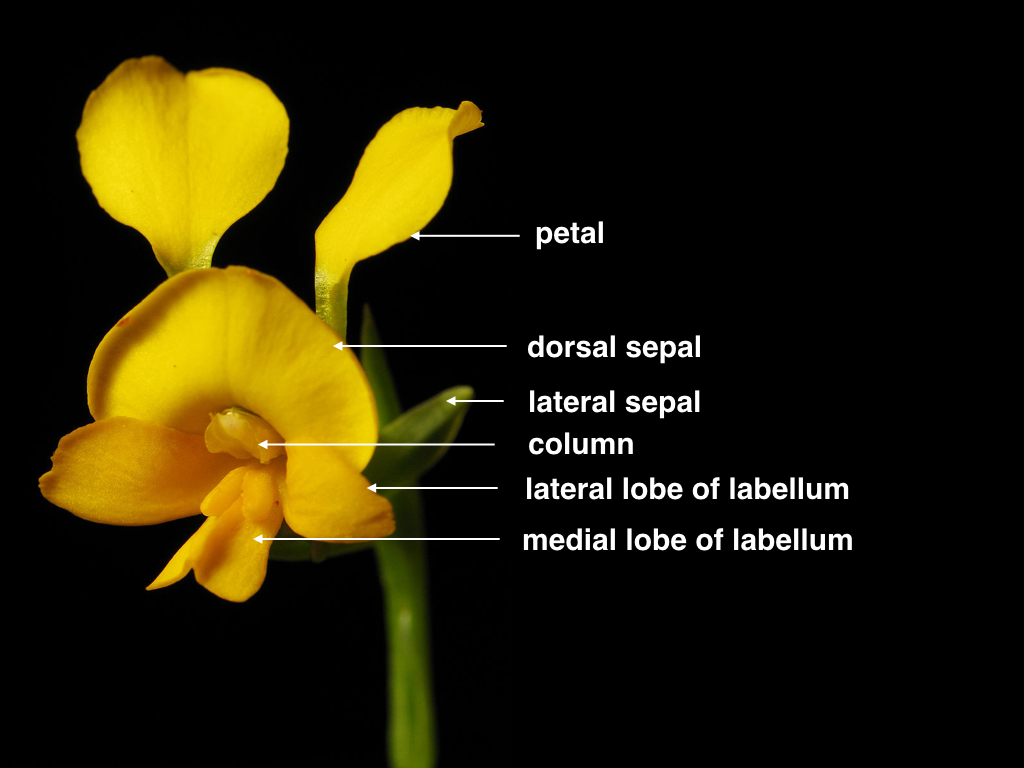
Resupinate flower of Diuris aequalis

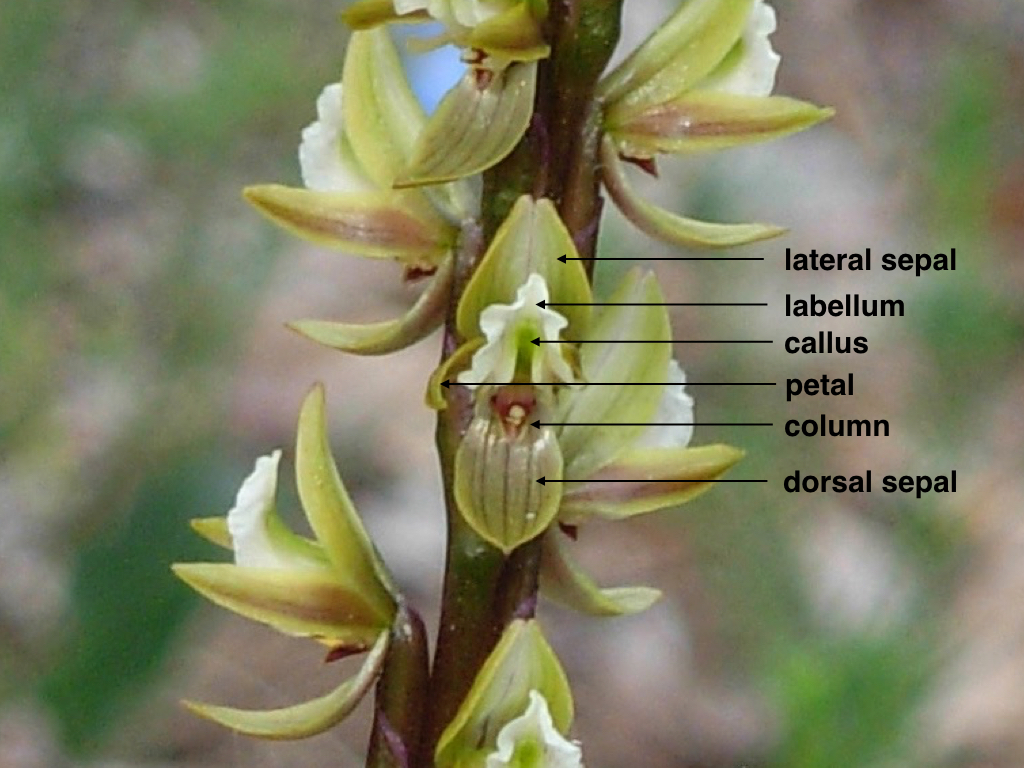
Non-resupinate flowers of Prasophyllum elatum

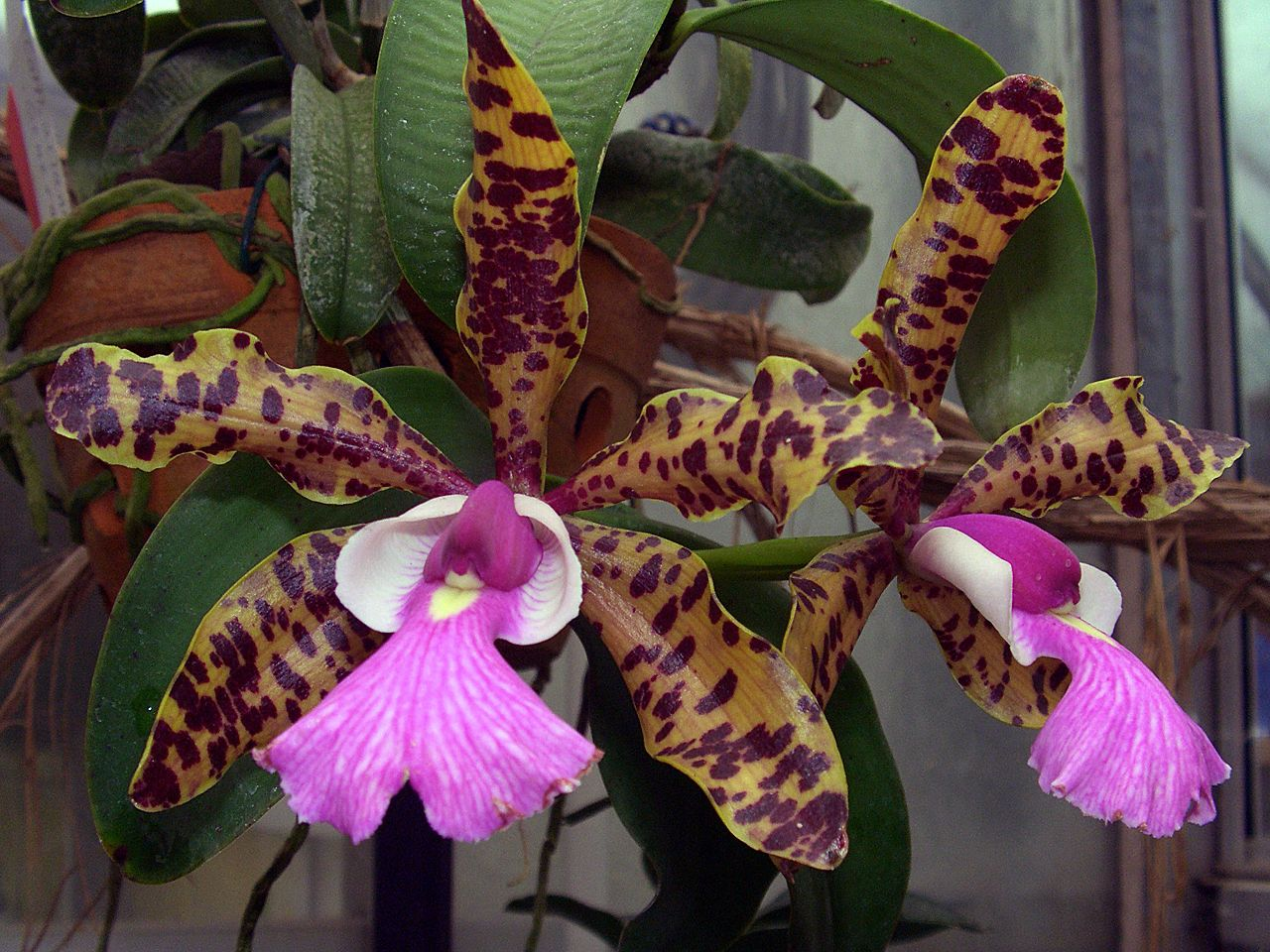
Resupinate flowers of Cattleya aclandiae

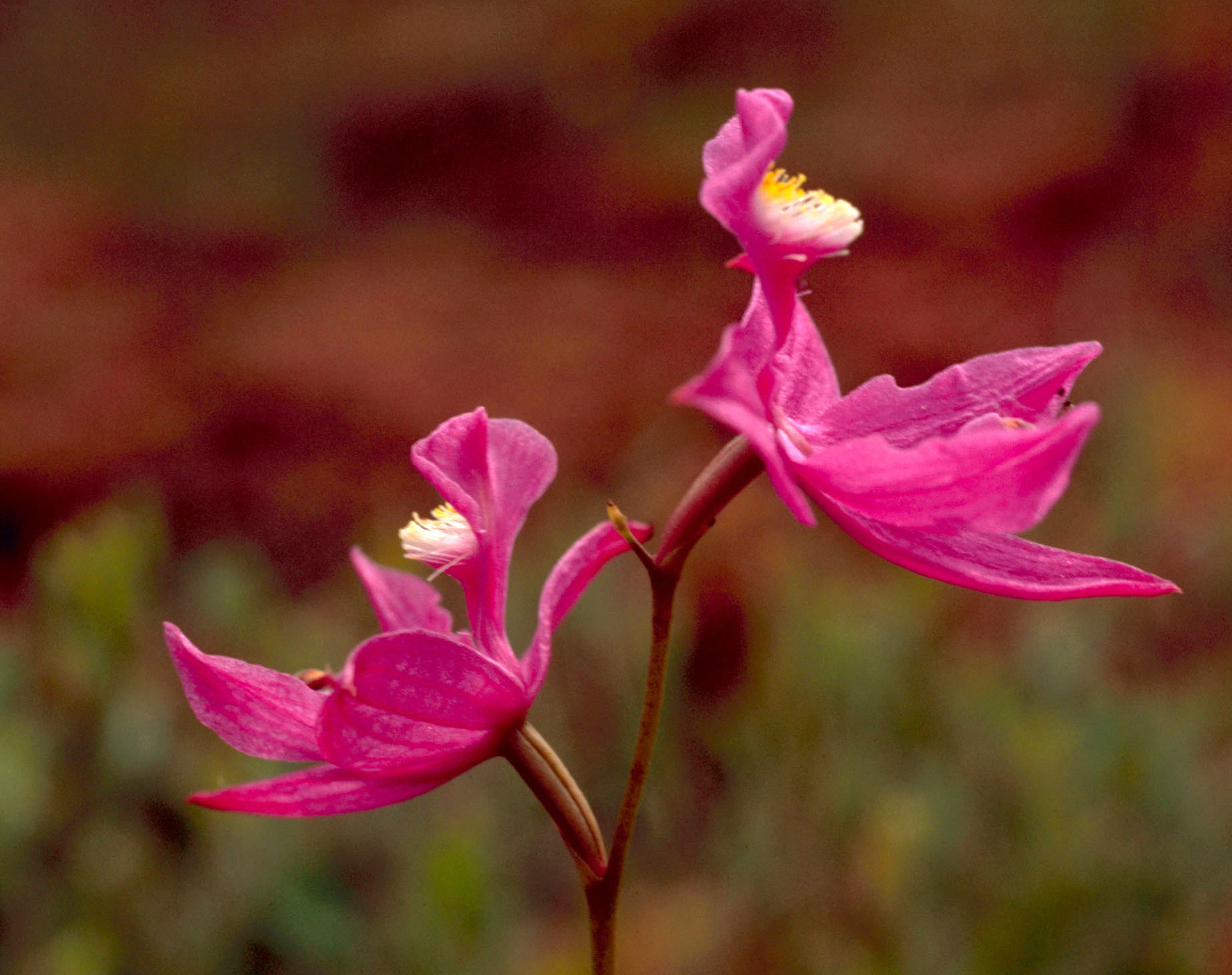
Non-resupinate flowers of Calopogon tuberosus

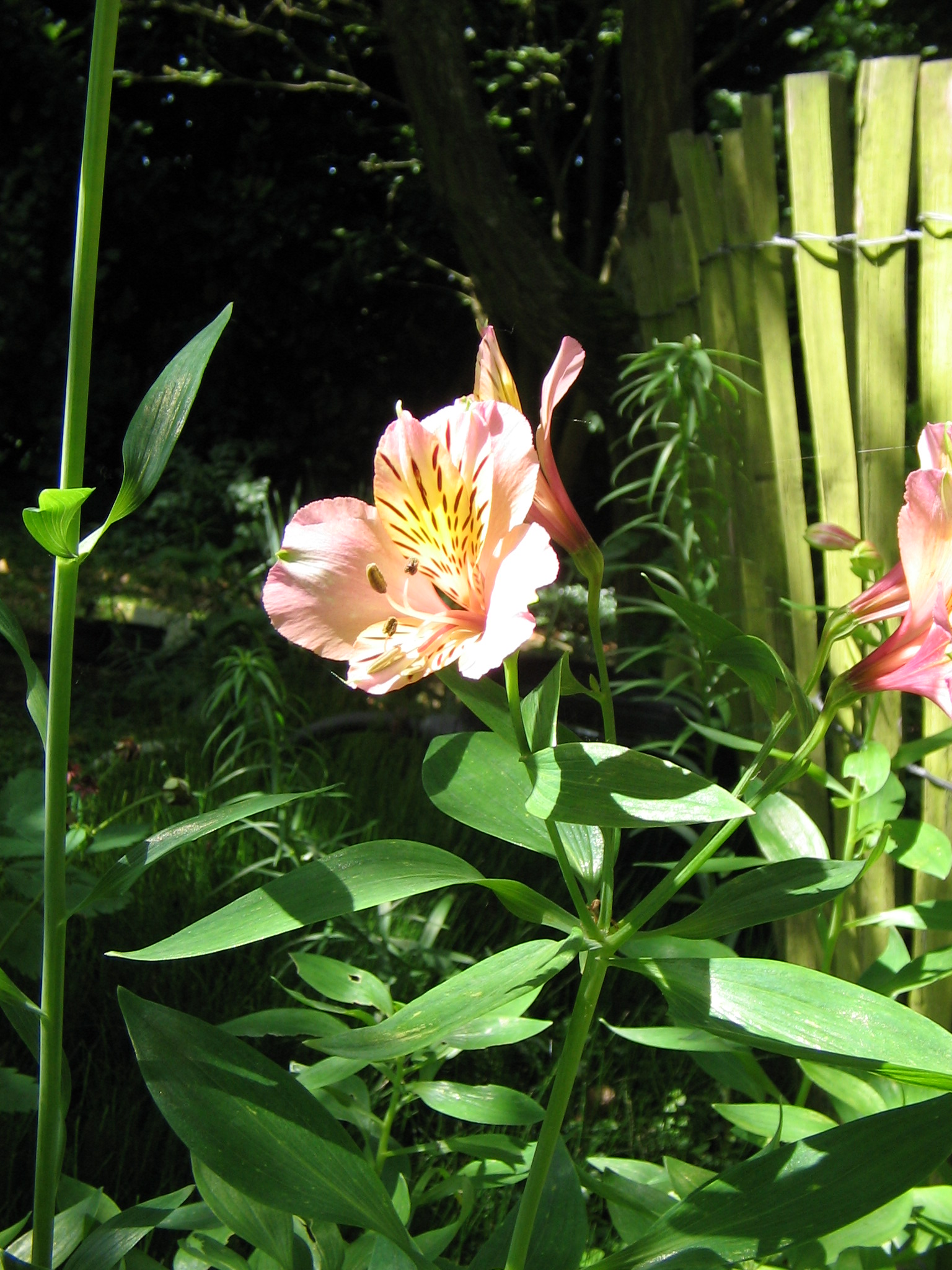
More or less resupinate leaves of Alstroemeria

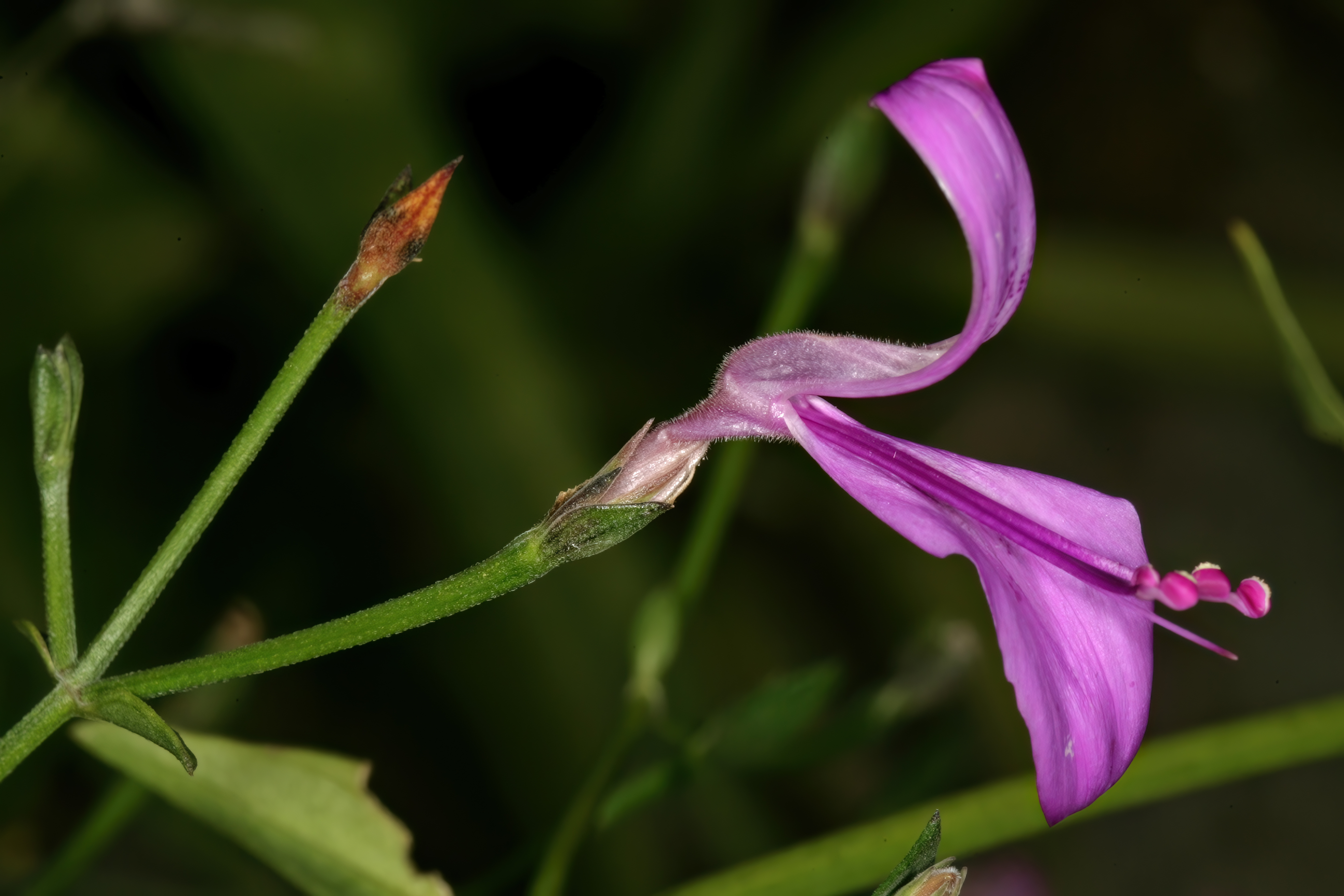
Resupinate flower of Dicliptera cernua; note coralla tube twisted 180 degrees

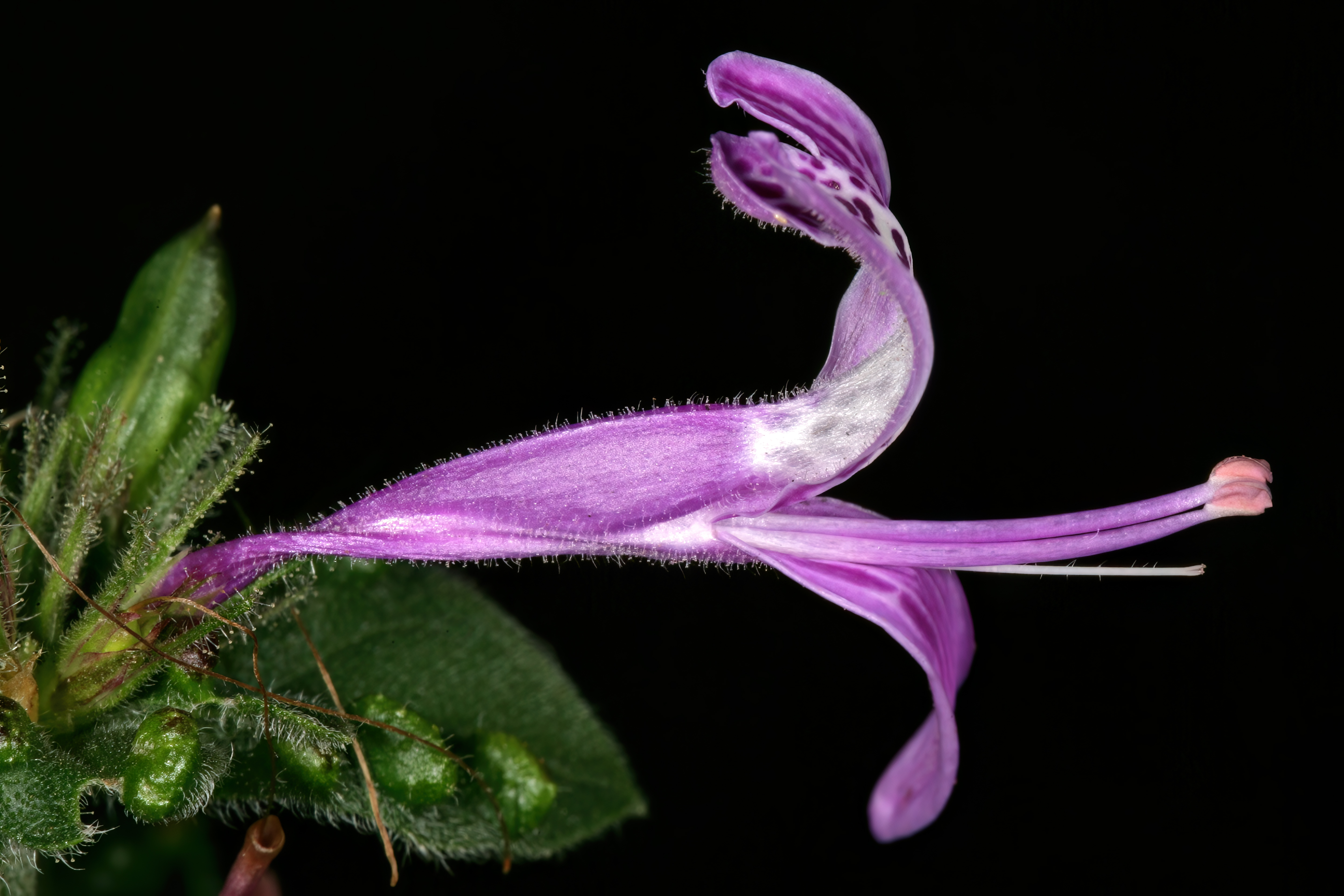
Resupinate flower of Hypoestes aristata; note coralla tube twisted 180 degrees

== Mycology ==
In fungi, the term "resupinate" describes a fruiting body consisting of a fertile surface adnate to the substrate. Certain genera such as Peniophora are notable for many of their species being resupinate.

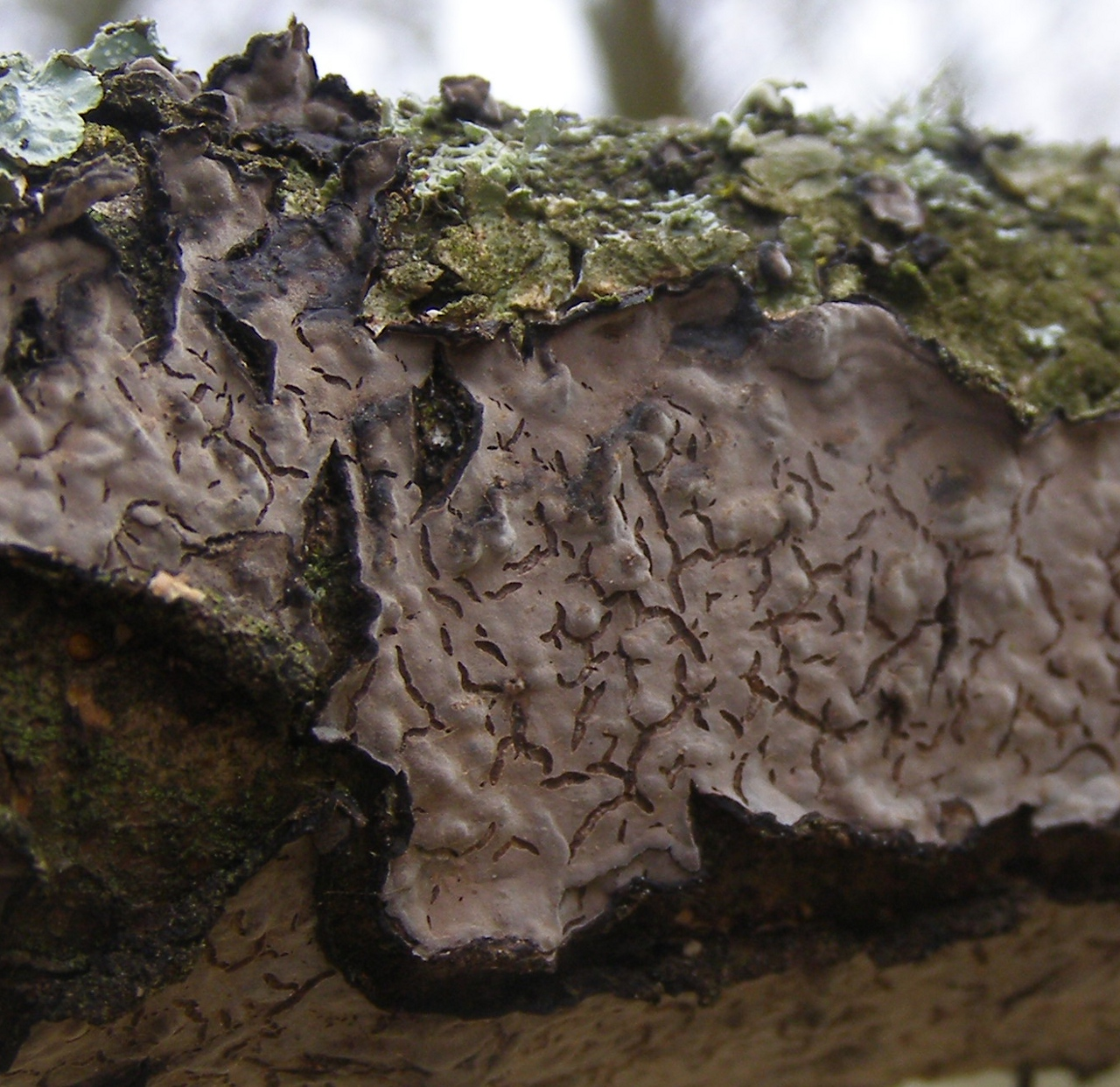
Peniophora quercina

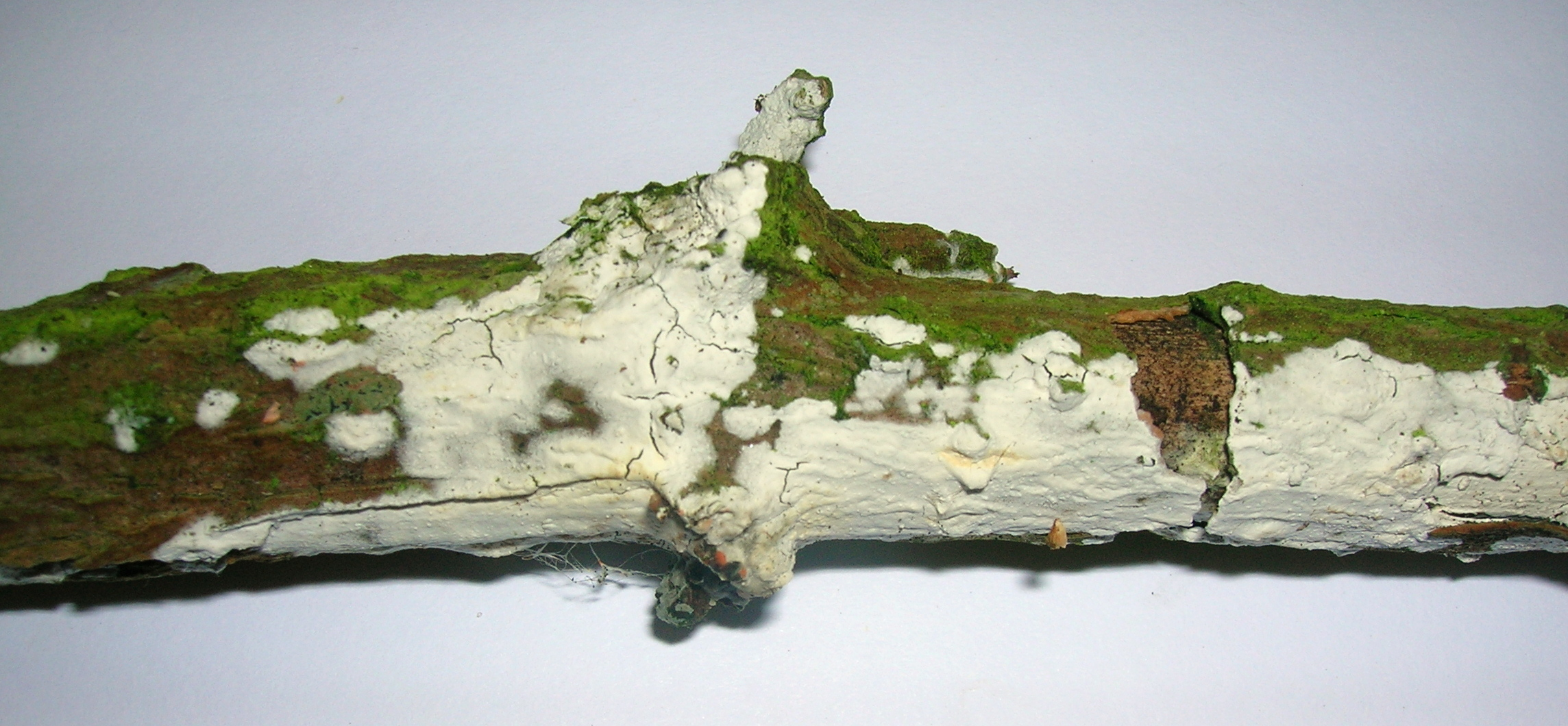
Hyphodontia sambuci
