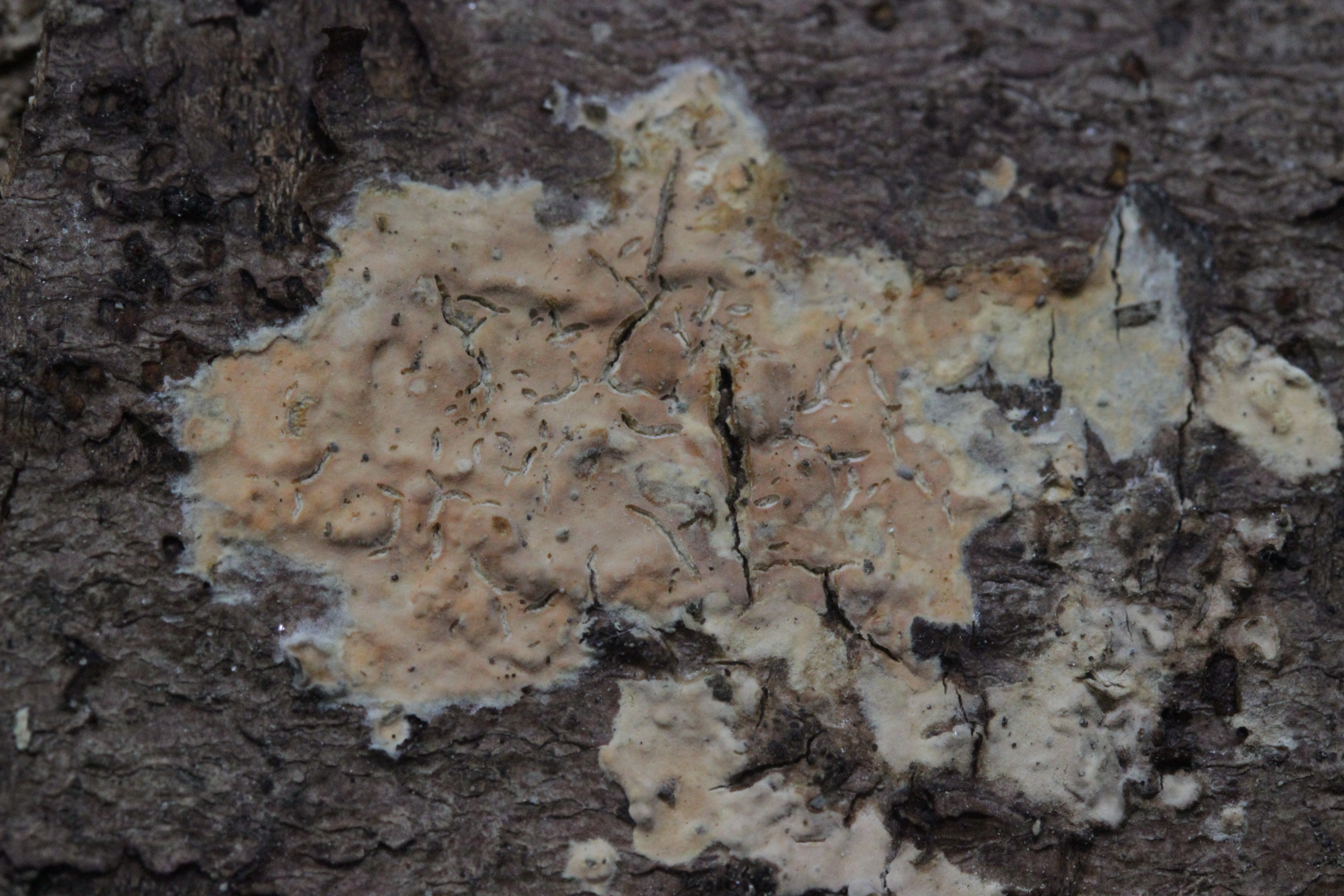
- Peniophora incarnata growing on the underside of a log of Acer pensylvanicum

Scientific classification
- Kingdom: Fungi
- Division: Basidiomycota
- Class: Agaricomycetes
- Order: Russulales
- Family: Peniophoraceae; Lotsy (1907)

Type genus
- Peniophora Cooke (1879)

Genera
- Amylofungus; Asterostroma; Asterostromella; Baltazaria; Dendrophora; Dichostereum; Duportella; Entomocorticium; Gloeocystidiopsis; Gloeopeniophora; Gloiothele; Lachnocladium; Licrostroma; Peniophora; Sceptrulum; Scytinostroma; Vararia; Vesiculomyces

= Peniophoraceae =

Family of fungi

The Peniophoraceae are a family of fungi in the order Russulales. Species of this family have a cosmopolitan distribution and are mostly saprobic, causing rots of standing and fallen wood. According to 2025 data the family contains 16 genera and 416 species.

== Genera ==
The family Peniophoraceae includes the following 16 genera:

1. Amylofungus
2. Asterostroma
3. Asterostromella
4. Baltazaria
5. Dendrophora
6. Dichostereum
7. Duportella
8. Entomocorticium
9. Gloeocystidiopsis
10. Gloeopeniophora
11. Gloiothele
12. Lachnocladium
13. Licrostroma
14. Peniophora
15. Sceptrulum
16. Scytinostroma
17. Vararia
18. Vesiculomyces
