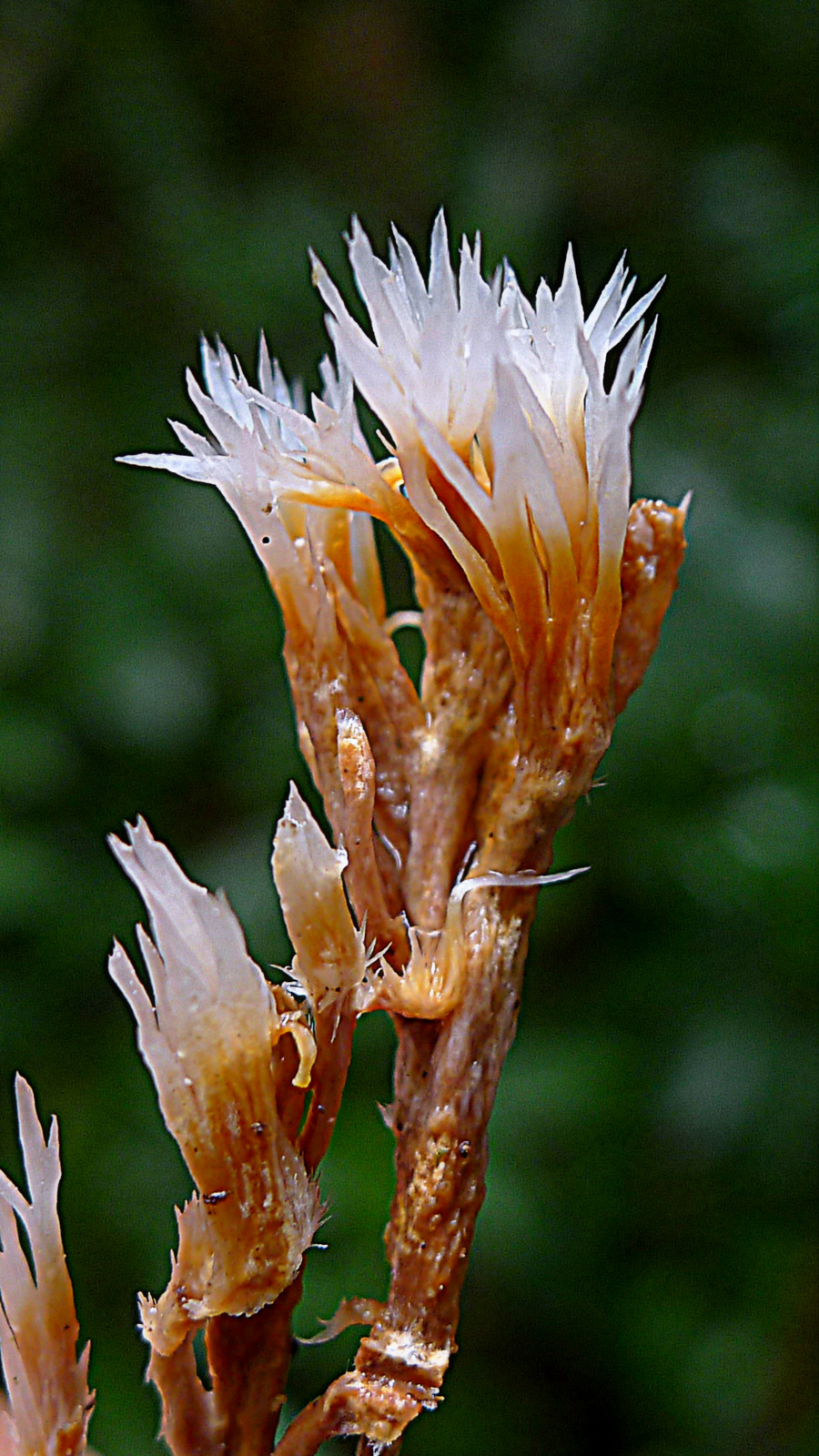
- Lachnocladium schweinfurthianum

Scientific classification
- Kingdom: Fungi
- Division: Basidiomycota
- Class: Agaricomycetes
- Order: Russulales
- Family: Lachnocladiaceae; D.A.Reid (1965)

Type genus
- Lachnocladium Lév. (1846)

Synonyms
- Dicantharellaceae Jülich (1982) Dichostereaceae Jülich (1981)

= Lachnocladiaceae =

Family of fungi

The Lachnocladiaceae are a family of fungi in the order Russulales. Based on 2025 data, this family currently only includes a single genus and three species. Other genera that belonged in the family in the past have been moved to Peniophoraceae based on latest molecular phylogenetic studies.

Species of this family, which have a widespread distribution in both tropical and temperate zones, are typically found on decaying coniferous or deciduous wood. The family was circumscribed by British mycologist Derek Reid in 1965.

== Species ==
The genus Stereofomes includes the following three species:

1. Stereofomes palmicola S. Ito & S. Imai
2. Stereofomes resupinatus Rick
3. Stereofomes terrestris Rick
