= Hemmesomyces =

Scientific classification
- Kingdom: Fungi
- Division: Basidiomycota
- Class: Agaricomycetes
- Order: Corticiales
- Family: Corticiaceae
- Genus: Hemmesomyces; Gilb. & Nakasone (2003)

Type species
- Hemmesomyces puauluensis Gilb. & Nakasone (2003)

Genus of fungi

Hemmesomyces is a fungal genus in the family Corticiaceae. The genus is monotypic, containing the single corticioid fungus species Hemmesomyces puauluensis, found in Hawaii. Hemmesomyces was circumscribed in 2003 by mycologists Robert L. Gilbertson and Karen Nakasone. It is named after Donald E. Hemmes, a biology professor at the University of Hawaii, "in recognition of his contributions to knowledge of Hawaiian fungi".
