= Leptocorticium =

Scientific classification
- Kingdom: Fungi
- Division: Basidiomycota
- Class: Agaricomycetes
- Order: Corticiales
- Family: Corticiaceae
- Genus: Leptocorticium; Hjortstam & Ryvarden (2002)

Type species
- Leptocorticium cyatheae (S. Ito & S.Imai) Hjortstam & Ryvarden (2002)

Species
- L. capitulatum L. cyatheae L. indicum L. sasae L. tenellum L. utribasidiatum

Genus of fungi

Leptocorticium is a genus of crust fungi in the family Corticiaceae. A 2008 estimate placed five species in the widespread genus; a sixth, L. indicum, was described from India in 2014.
