= Papyrodiscus =

Scientific classification
- Kingdom: Fungi
- Division: Basidiomycota
- Class: Agaricomycetes
- Order: Corticiales
- Family: Corticiaceae
- Genus: Papyrodiscus; D.A. Reid

Type species
- Papyrodiscus ferrugineus D.A. Reid

Genus of fungi

Papyrodiscus is a genus of fungi in the family Corticiaceae. The genus is monotypic, containing the single species Papyrodiscus ferrugineus, found in Papua New Guinea.
