= Dendrophysellum =

Scientific classification
- Kingdom: Fungi
- Division: Basidiomycota
- Class: Agaricomycetes
- Order: Corticiales
- Family: Corticiaceae
- Genus: Dendrophysellum; Parmasto

Type species
- Dendrophysellum amurense Parmasto

Genus of fungi

Dendrophysellum is a genus of fungi in the family Corticiaceae. The genus is monotypic, containing the single species Dendrophysellum amurense, found in the former USSR.
