= Amylobasidium =

Scientific classification
- Kingdom: Fungi
- Division: Basidiomycota
- Class: Agaricomycetes
- Order: Corticiales
- Family: Corticiaceae
- Genus: Amylobasidium; Ginns (1988)

Type species
- Amylobasidium tsugae Ginns (1988)

Genus of fungi

Amylobasidium is a fungal genus in the family Corticiaceae. It is a monotypic genus, containing the single species Amylobasidium tsugae. First reported by J. Ginns in 1988, it was found growing on wood and in the bark crevices of logs of Tsuga mertensiana from the volcanic peaks in the cordillera of western North America.
