= Waitea zeae =

Scientific classification
- Kingdom: Fungi
- Division: Basidiomycota
- Class: Agaricomycetes
- Order: Corticiales
- Family: Corticiaceae
- Genus: Waitea
- Species: W. zeae

Binomial name
- Waitea zeae (Voorhees) J.A. Crouch & Cubeta (2021)

Synonyms
- Rhizoctonia zeae Voorhees (1934) Moniliopsis zeae (Voorhees) R.T. Moore (1987)

Species of fungus

Waitea zeae is a species of fungus in the family Corticiaceae. Basidiocarps (fruit bodies) are corticioid, thin, effused, and web-like, but the fungus is more frequently encountered in its similar but sterile anamorphic state. Waitea zeae is best known as a plant pathogen, causing commercially significant damage to cereals, grasses, and a wide range of other plants.

== Taxonomy ==
Rhizoctonia zeae was originally described from Florida in 1934. It was later considered to be the anamorph (asexual state) of Waitea circinata. Molecular research has, however, shown that Waitea circinata is part of a complex of at least four genetically distinct taxa, each causing visibly different diseases. These taxa were initially treated (invalidly) as varieties of W. circinata, but have now been described as separate species.
