= O-Phenylenediamine =

o-Phenylenediamine
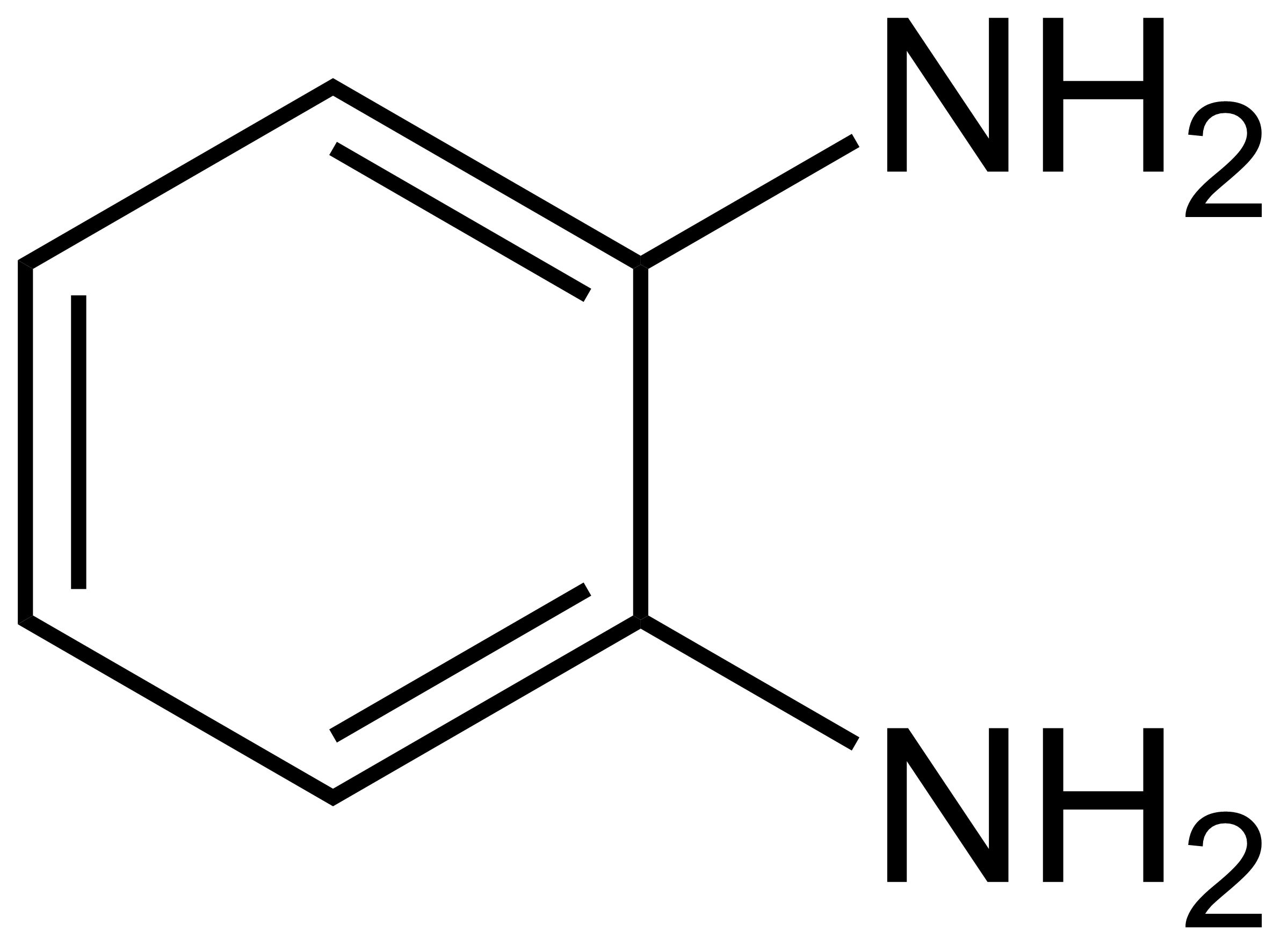

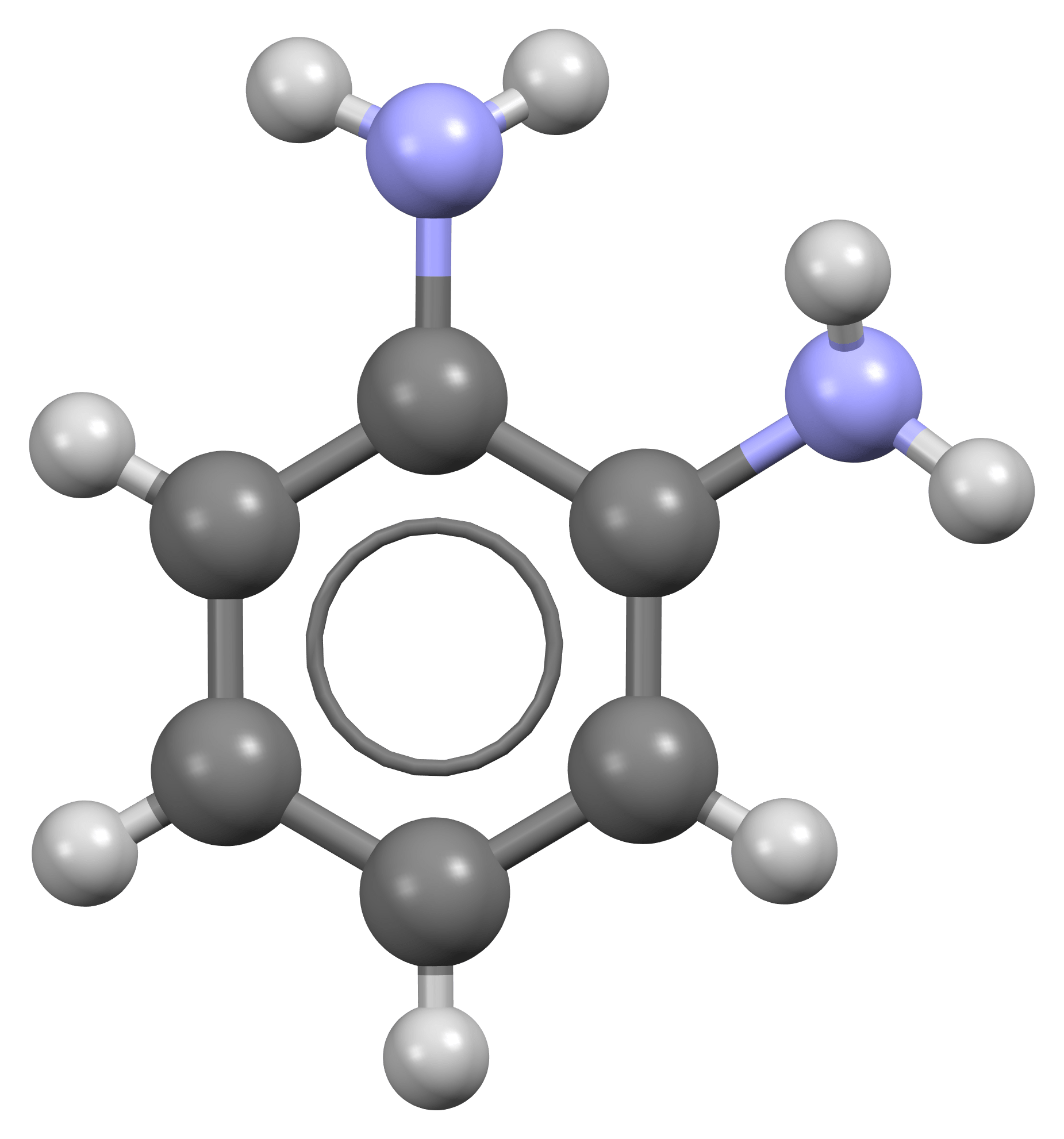

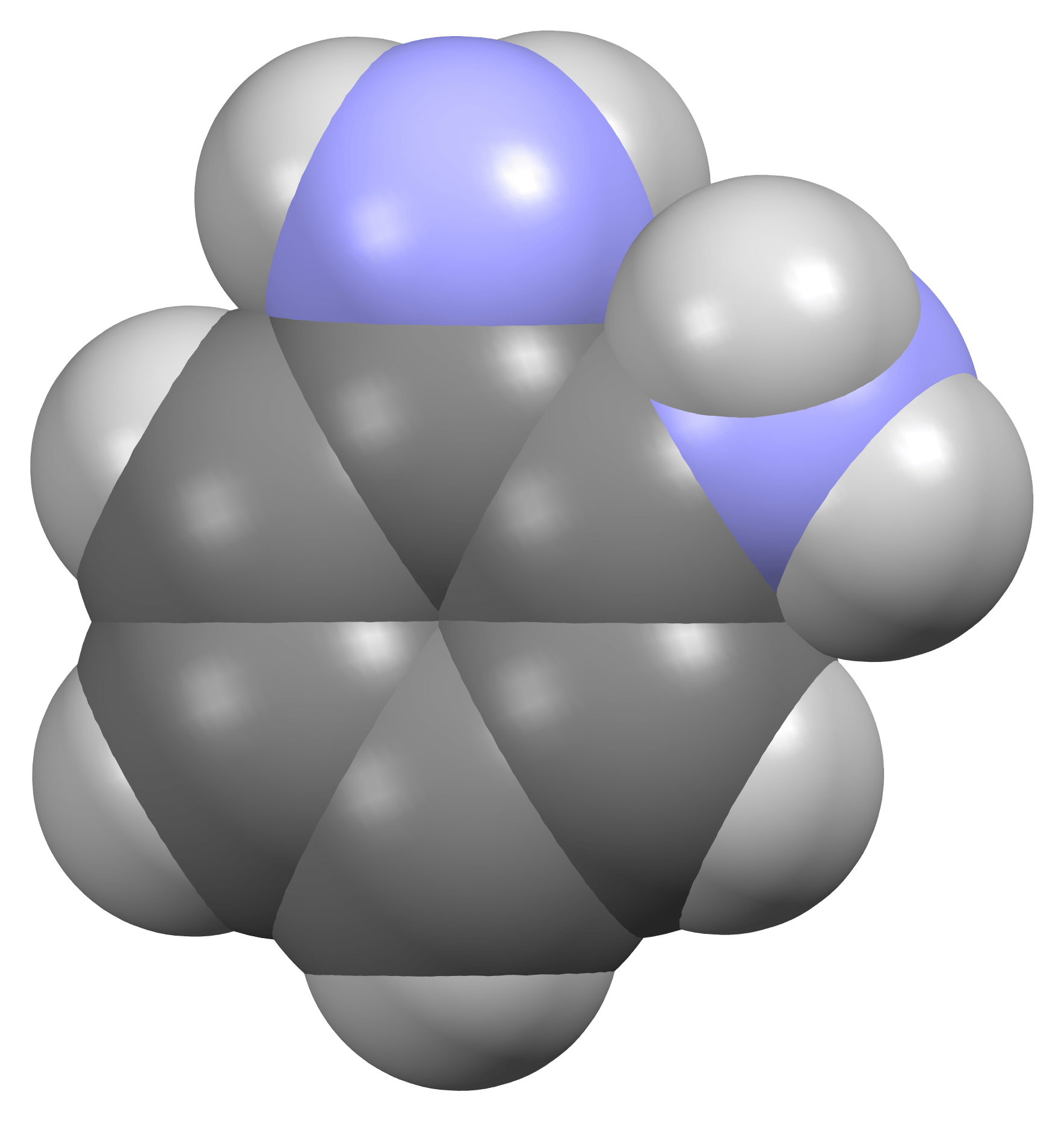

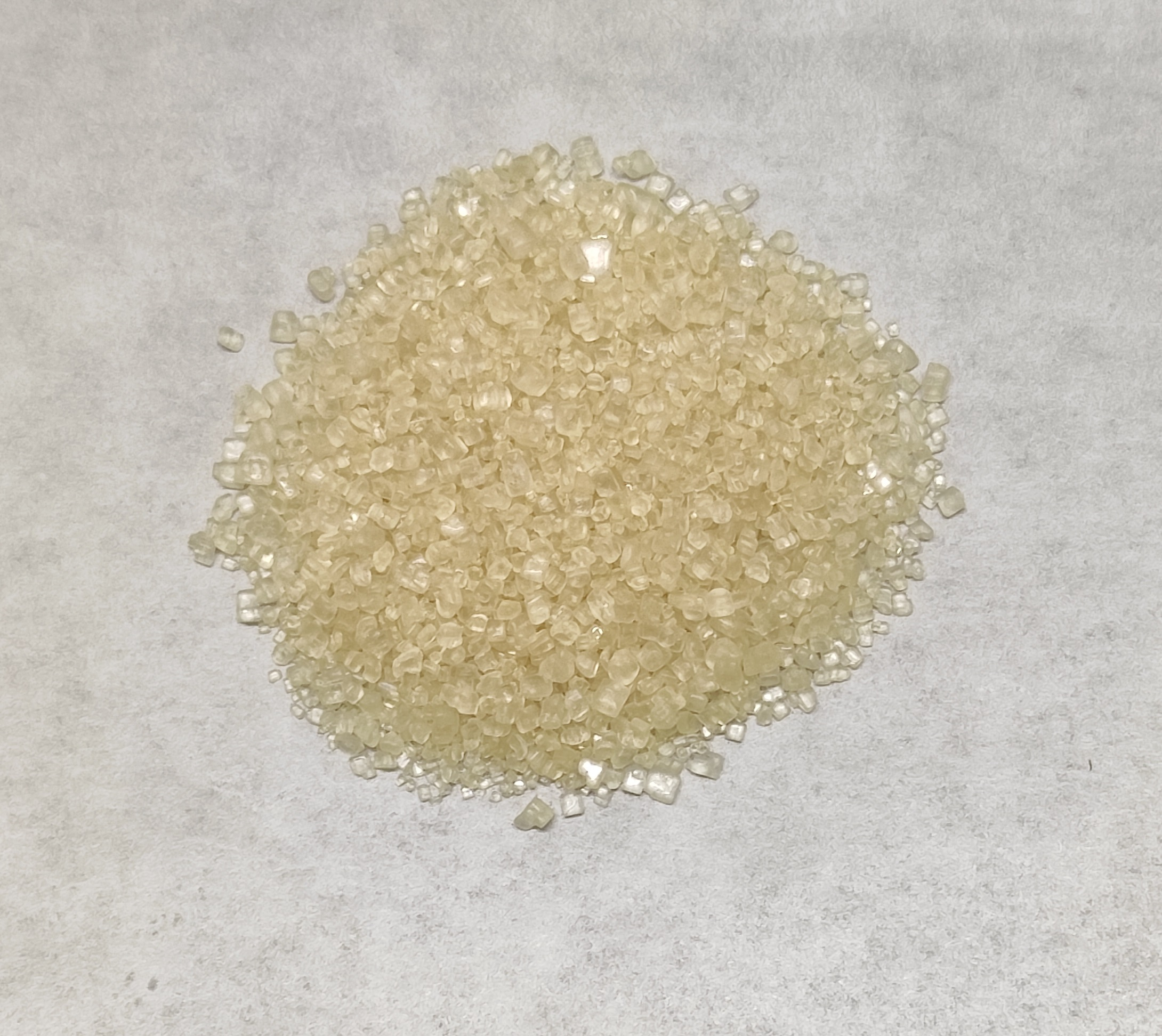

Names
- Preferred IUPAC name Benzene-1,2-diamine
- Other names o-Phenylene diamine 1,2-Diaminobenzene; 1,2-Phenylenediamine

Identifiers
| CAS Number | 95-54-5 |
| 3D model (JSmol) | Interactive image |
| ChEBI | CHEBI:34043 |
| ChEMBL | ChEMBL70582 |
| ChemSpider | 13837582 |
| ECHA InfoCard | 100.002.210 |
| EC Number | 202-430-6 |
| PubChem CID | 7243 |
| RTECS number | SS7875000 |
| UNII | 8B713N8Q0F |
| UN number | 1673 |
| CompTox Dashboard (EPA) | DTXSID3025881 |
- InChI: InChI=1S/C6H8N2/c7-5-3-1-2-4-6(5)8/h1-4H,7-8H2 Key: GEYOCULIXLDCMW-UHFFFAOYSA-N; InChI=1/C6H8N2/c7-5-3-1-2-4-6(5)8/h1-4H,7-8H2 Key: GEYOCULIXLDCMW-UHFFFAOYAR
- SMILES: Nc1ccccc1N

Properties
| Chemical formula | C_{6}H_{8}N_{2} |
| Molar mass | 108.144 g·mol^{−1} |
| Appearance | white solid |
| Density | 1.031 g/cm^{3} |
| Melting point | 102 to 104 °C (216 to 219 °F; 375 to 377 K) |
| Boiling point | 252 °C (486 °F; 525 K) Other sources: 256 to 258 °C (493 to 496 °F; 529 to 531 K) |
| Solubility in water | soluble in hot water |
| Acidity (pK_{a}) | 0.80 (doubly protonated form; 20 °C, H_{2}O); 4.57 (conjugate acid; 20 °C, H_{2}O) |
| Magnetic susceptibility (χ) | −71.98·10^{−6} cm^{3}/mol |

Hazards
- GHS labelling
| Pictograms | (GHS06: Toxic) (GHS07: Exclamation mark) (GHS08: Health hazard) (GHS09: Environmental hazard) |
| Signal word | Danger |
| Hazard statements | H301, H312, H317, H319, H332, H341, H351, H410 |
| Precautionary statements | P201, P202, P261, P264, P270, P271, P272, P273, P280, P281, P301+P310, P302+P352, P304+P312, P304+P340, P305+P351+P338, P308+P313, P312, P321, P322, P330, P333+P313, P337+P313, P363, P391, P405, P501 |
| NFPA 704 (fire diamond) | 3 1 0 |
| Flash point | 156 °C (313 °F; 429 K) |
| Safety data sheet (SDS) | Oxford MSDS |
- Except where otherwise noted, data are given for materials in their standard state (at 25 °C [77 °F], 100 kPa). verify (what is ?) Infobox references

o-Phenylenediamine (OPD) is an organic compound with the formula C_{6}H_{4}(NH_{2})_{2}. This aromatic diamine is an important precursor to many heterocyclic compounds. OPD is a white compound although samples appear darker owing to oxidation by air. It is isomeric with m-phenylenediamine and p-phenylenediamine.

== Preparation ==
Commonly, 2-nitrochlorobenzene is treated with ammonia to generate 2-nitroaniline, whose nitro group is then reduced:

ClC_{6}H_{4}NO_{2} + 2 NH_{3} → H_{2}NC_{6}H_{4}NO_{2} + NH_{4}Cl

H_{2}NC_{6}H_{4}NO_{2} + 3 H_{2} → H_{2}NC_{6}H_{4}NH_{2} + 2 H_{2}O

In the laboratory, the reduction of the nitroaniline is effected with zinc powder in ethanol, followed by purification of the diamine as the hydrochloride salt. Darkened impure samples can be purified by treatment of its aqueous solution with sodium dithionite and activated carbon.

== Reactions and uses ==
o-Phenylenediamine condenses with ketones and aldehydes to give rise to various valuable products. Its reactions with formic acids to produce benzimidazole. Other carboxylic acids give 2-substituted benzimidazoles. The herbicides benomyl and fuberidazole are made in this manner. Thiophanate-methyl is another herbicide produced from o-phenylenediamine. Condensation with potassium ethylxanthate gives 2-mercaptobenzimidazole. With nitrous acid, o-phenylenediamine condenses to give benzotriazole, a corrosion inhibitor.

Quinoxalinedione may be prepared by condensation of o-phenylenediamine with dimethyl oxalate. Mercaptoimidazole are commonly used as antioxidants in rubber production, obtained by condensing xanthate esters. Condensation of substituted o-phenylenediamine with diketones yields various pharmaceuticals.

OPD is a ligand in coordination chemistry. Oxidation of metal-phenylenediamine complexes affords the diimine derivatives. OPD condenses with salicylaldehyde to give chelating Schiff base ligands.

It reacts with thionyl chloride to give 2,1,3-benzothiadiazole: C_{6}H_{4}(NH_{2})_{2} + 2 SOCl_{2} → C_{6}H_{4}(N)_{2}S + SO_{2} + 4HCl

== Safety ==
With an LD_{50} of 44 mg/L (in water), o-phenylenediamine is about 1000 times less toxic than the para-isomer. Anilines are typically handled as if they are carcinogenic. For many applications, OPD has been replaced by safer alternatives such as 3,3',5,5'-tetramethylbenzidine.
