= Ambivina =

Scientific classification
- Kingdom: Fungi
- Division: Basidiomycota
- Class: Agaricomycetes
- Order: Corticiales
- Family: Corticiaceae
- Genus: Ambivina; Katz (1974)

Type species
- Ambivina filobasidia Katz (1974)

Genus of fungi

Ambivina is a fungal genus in the family Corticiaceae. It is a monotypic genus, containing the single species Ambivina filobasidia, described by B. Katz in 1974.
