= Benzimidazole fungicide =

Class of chemical compounds

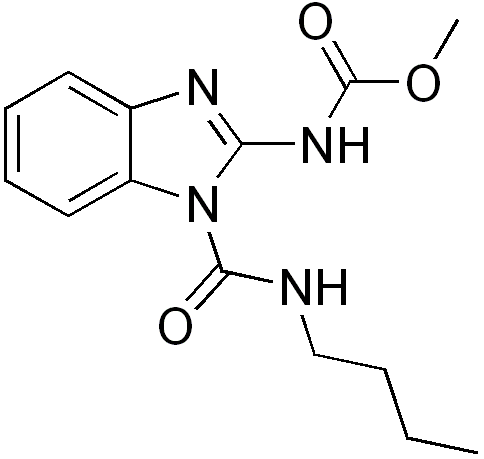
Chemical structure of benomyl

Benzimidazole fungicides are a class of fungicides including benomyl, carbendazim (MBC), thiophanate-methyl, thiabendazole and fuberidazole. They can control many ascomycetes and basidiomycetes, but not oomycetes. They are applied to cereals, fruits, vegetables and vines, and are also used in postharvest handling of crops.

The solubility of benzimidazole fungicides is low at physiological pH and becomes high at low pH. In plants, carbendazim, thiabendazole and fuberidazole are mobile, i.e. systemic, and benomyl and thiophanate-methyl are converted to carbendazim. This conversion also occurs in soils and animals. In soil and water, carbendazim is mainly degraded by microbes. They are metabolized through hydrolysis and photolysis in plants. These fungicides kill cells during mitosis by distorting the mitotic spindle; β-tubulin, a protein important in forming the cytoskeleton, is targeted. They mostly inhibit polymerization of β-tubulin by interacting with it directly, but other interactions also exist.

Starting in the late 1960s, they were widely used to control fungal pathogens such as Botrytis cinerea, Cercospora, powdery mildew and eyespot. These systemic fungicides were very effective at first. Because there is only one target site, benzimidazole resistance – fungicide resistance to this class – quickly became a serious problem. When they were the only fungicides used, pathogens became resistant after two to four seasons; when mixed with other fungicides, resistance developed more slowly. Resistant genotypes with certain point mutations were selected. Mutant pathogens resistant to one benzimidazole fungicide are usually resistant to all of them. The F200Y and E198A,G,K mutations are the most common. Because of resistance problems, use of benzimidazole fungicides has declined. They are suspected to be toxic to animals, including humans. The Fungicide Resistance Action Committee lists them as having a high risk of resistance evolution.
