= Waitea oryzae =

Scientific classification
- Kingdom: Fungi
- Division: Basidiomycota
- Class: Agaricomycetes
- Order: Corticiales
- Family: Corticiaceae
- Genus: Waitea
- Species: W. oryzae

Binomial name
- Waitea oryzae J.A. Crouch & Cubeta (2021)

Synonyms
- Rhizoctonia oryzae Ryker & Gooch (1938) nom. inval. Moniliopsis oryzae Ryker & Gooch ex R.T. Moore (1987) nom. inval. Waitea circinata var. oryzae Toda et al. (2005) nom. inval.

Species of fungus

Waitea oryzae is a species of fungus in the family Corticiaceae. Basidiocarps (fruit bodies) are corticioid, thin, effused, and web-like, but the fungus is more frequently encountered in its similar but sterile anamorphic state. Waitea oryzae is best known as a plant pathogen, causing commercially significant leaf and sheath spots of rice and other cereals.

== Taxonomy ==
Rhizoctonia oryzae was originally described on Oryza sativa (rice) from Louisiana in 1938, but was invalidly published. It was later considered to be the anamorph (asexual state) of Waitea circinata. Molecular research has, however, shown that Waitea circinata is part of a complex of at least four genetically distinct taxa, each causing visibly different diseases. These taxa were initially treated (invalidly) as varieties of W. circinata, but have now been validly described as separate species.
