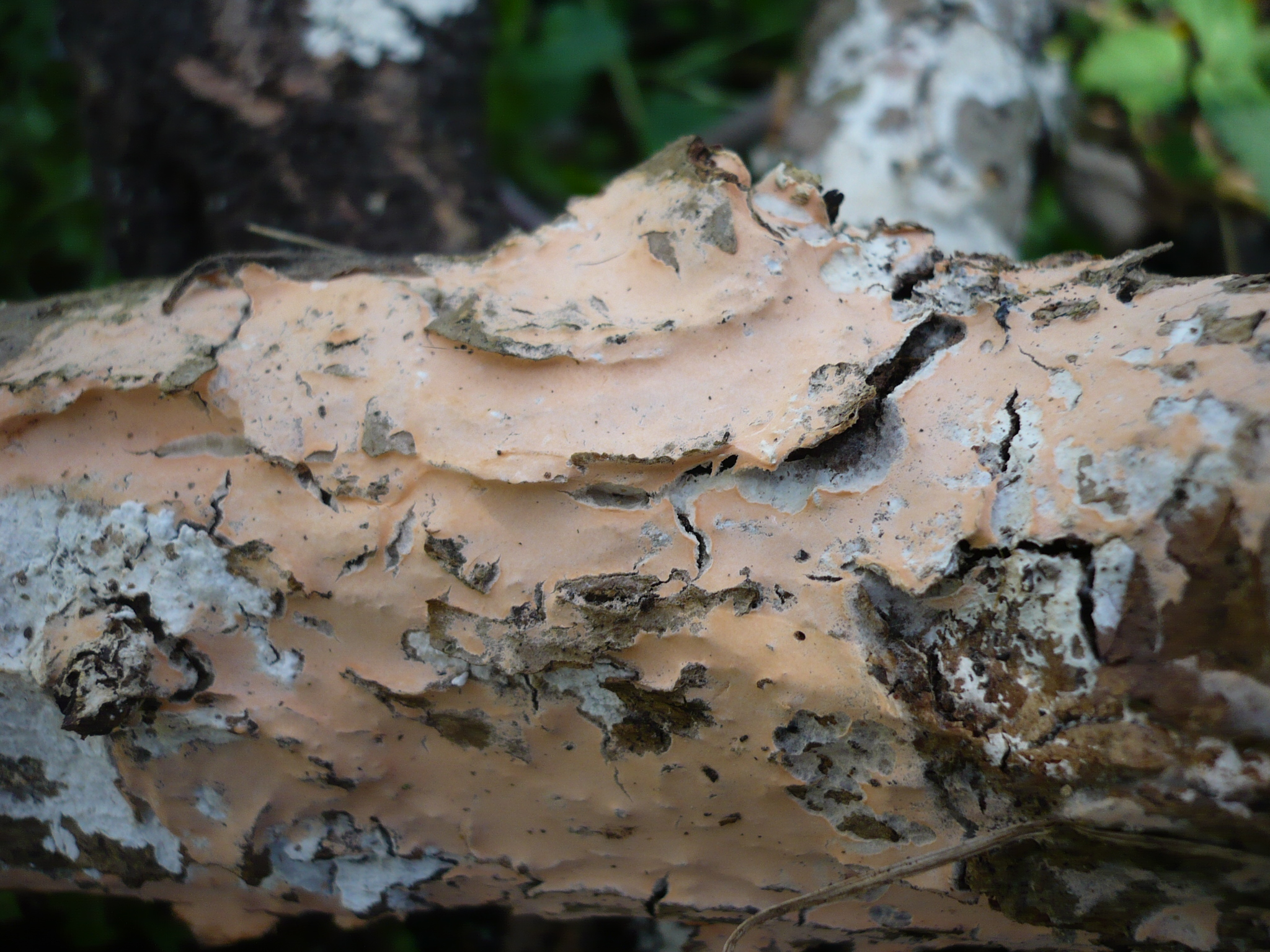
- Erythricium laetum

Scientific classification
- Kingdom: Fungi
- Division: Basidiomycota
- Class: Agaricomycetes
- Order: Corticiales
- Family: Corticiaceae
- Genus: Erythricium; J. Erikss. & Hjortstam (1970)

Type species
- Erythricium laetum

Species
- E. atropatanum E. aurantiacum E. hypnophilum E. salmonicolor E. vernum

Synonyms
- Marchandiobasidium Diederich & Schultheis (2003)

= Erythricium =

Genus of fungi

Erythricium is a genus of fungi in the family Corticiaceae. Basidiocarps (fruit bodies) are effused, corticioid, and grow on wood or are lichenicolous. Erythricium salmonicolor is a widespread and commercially significant plant pathogen causing "pink disease" of Citrus and other trees.
