= Nothocorticium =

Scientific classification
- Kingdom: Fungi
- Division: Basidiomycota
- Class: Agaricomycetes
- Order: Corticiales
- Family: Corticiaceae
- Genus: Nothocorticium; Gresl. & Rajchenb.

Type species
- Nothocorticium patagonicum Gresl. & Rajchenb.

Genus of fungi

Nothocorticium is a genus of fungi in the family Corticiaceae. The genus is monotypic, containing the single species Nothocorticium patagonicum, found in Argentina.
