= Red thread disease =

Fungal plant disease

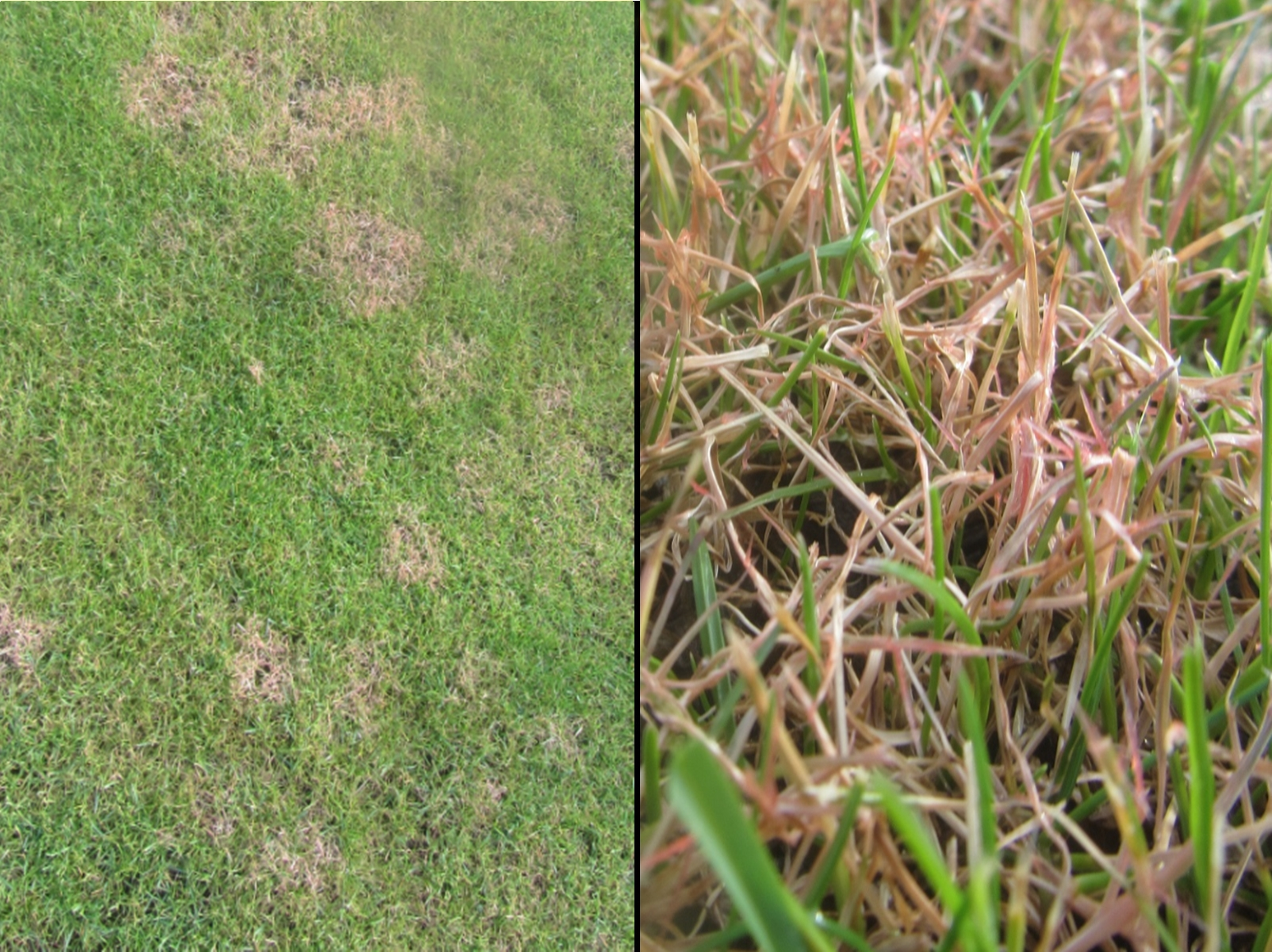
Distance and close-up images of red thread disease

Red thread disease is a fungal infection found on lawns and other turfed areas. It is caused by the corticioid fungus Laetisaria fuciformis and has two separate stages. The stage that gives the infection its name is characterised by very thin, red, needle-like strands extending from the grass blade. These are stromata, which can remain viable in soil for two years. After germinating, the stromata infect grass leaf blades through their stomata. The other stage is visible as small, pink, cotton wool-like mycelium, found where the blades meet. It is common when both warmth and humidity are high.

Environment

Laetisaria fuciformis, the fungus that causes red thread disease develops more often in cool (59–77 °F (15–25 °C)) and wet conditions.^{1} These conditions are more present in the spring and fall when rainfall is higher and temperatures are slightly lower. Over 77 °F (25 °C), the growth rate of the fungus decreases significantly, and it ceases at 85 °F (29 °C).^{8} Turf grass that is poor in nutrition and are slow growing are areas that are more susceptible to red thread disease.^{2} The fungus grows from the thread like red webbing structures called sclerotia.^{1} The sclerotia can survive in leaf blades, thatch, and soil for months to years. These areas that have been infected spread the disease by water, wind, and contaminated equipment.^{1} Since this fungus can survive for long periods of time it is essential to cure the infected area so further spreading of the disease does not occur.

Management

Managing red thread disease first starts by providing conditions that are not favorable for the fungal disease to develop. Having a balanced and adequate nitrogen fertilization program helps suppress the disease.^{3} A light application of quick release nitrogen reduces disease severity and is generally the only treatment necessary on residential lawns.^{8} This includes applying mild to substantial amounts of phosphorus and potassium to the turf. Other than properly fertilizing the turf, it is very important to maintain a soil pH between 6.5 and 7.^{3} Having a more basic pH creates less favorable conditions for a fungus to form. Reducing shade on turf areas also reduces chances of the fungal disease to form because shaded areas create a higher humidity near the turfs surface.^{3} Another technique to suppressing red thread disease is top dressing with compost.^{4} Suppression of the disease increases with the increase of compost used on the turf.^{4} Another way to protect the grass in the area is to overseed with resistant varieties of turfgrass. Several resistant varieties of perennial ryegrass, fescues, and Kentucky bluegrass are available.^{8} Fungicides are not recommended to control red thread because the cost of chemical control is expensive and turf grasses usually recover from the disease quickly. ^{1} If the use of fungicides is necessary, products containing strobilurins can be applied and can be very effective if applied before symptoms occur.^{1}

Hosts and symptoms

The hosts of the red thread disease only include turf grass. Turf grass is primarily present on home lawns and sports fields. Some of these turf grass species include annual bluegrass, creeping bentgrass, Kentucky bluegrass, perennial ryegrass, fine fescue, and bermudagrass.^{5} These species of grass are not the only types of turf that can be diagnosed with red thread disease but are the most common hosts.^{5} Noticeable symptoms of red thread disease are irregular yellow patches on the turf that are 2 to 24 inches in diameter.^{6} Affected areas are diagnosed with faintly pinkish web like sclerotia on the leaf blades.^{6} This sclerotia is the fungus growing on the leaf blades.^{6} This sclerotia has a reddish to pink spider web look to it. The sclerotia are branched and they may extend up to 0.4 inches (10 mm) beyond the end of the leaf tip. ^{7}

== Identification ==
The first signs of infection are small irregular patches of brown/yellowing grass. Upon closer inspection, either the tiny red needles or the pink fluffy mycelium will be visible. As the infection spreads, the small patches will join to form large brown areas.

== Treatment ==
Feeding the lawn with a nitrogen based fertilizer will help the grass recover and help prevent future attacks.

Sources differ about treatment of Red Thread with benzimidazole fungicides, especially benomyl and carbendazim. Pennsylvania State University Extension recommends thiophanate-methyl alone among benzimidazoles but some reviewers describe benzimidazoles as universally beneficial to the pathogen and so detrimental for treatment of red thread. The infection will rarely kill the grass, usually only affecting the blades and not the roots, and the lawn should recover in time.

1) Ryzin, Benjamin Van. “Red Thread.” Wisconsin Horticulture, 23 June 2013, hort.uwex.edu/articles/red-thread/

2) Harmon, Philip, and Richard Latin. “Red Thread.” Purdue Extension, Dec. 2009, www.extension.purdue.edu/extmedia/bp/bp-104-w.pdf.

3) “Red Thread.” Plant Protection, NuTurf, nuturf.com.au/wp-content/uploads/sites/2/2015/09/Red-Thread-Info.pdf.

4) “Suppression of Soil-Borne Plant Diseases with Composts: A Review.” Taylor & Francis, www.tandfonline.com/doi/abs/10.1080/09583150400015904

5) “Red Thread — Laetisaria Fuciformis.” Red Thread (Laetisaria Fuciformis) - MSU Turf Diseases.net - Disease Identification and Information. A Resource Guide from the Dept. of Plant Pathology at Michigan State University, www.msuturfdiseases.net/details/_/red_thread_14/.

6) “Lawn and Turf-Red Thread.” Pacific Northwest Pest Management Handbooks, OSU Extension Service - Extension and Experiment Station Communications, 4 Apr. 2017, pnwhandbooks.org/plantdisease/host-disease/lawn-turf-red-thread.

7) Smiley, Richard W., et al. Compendium of Turfgrass Diseases. Third ed., The American Phytopathological Society, 2007.

8) Dicklow, M. Bess. “Red Thread and Pink Patch.” Center for Agriculture, Food and the Environment, 4 Oct. 2019, ag.umass.edu/turf/fact-sheets/red-thread-pink-patch.
