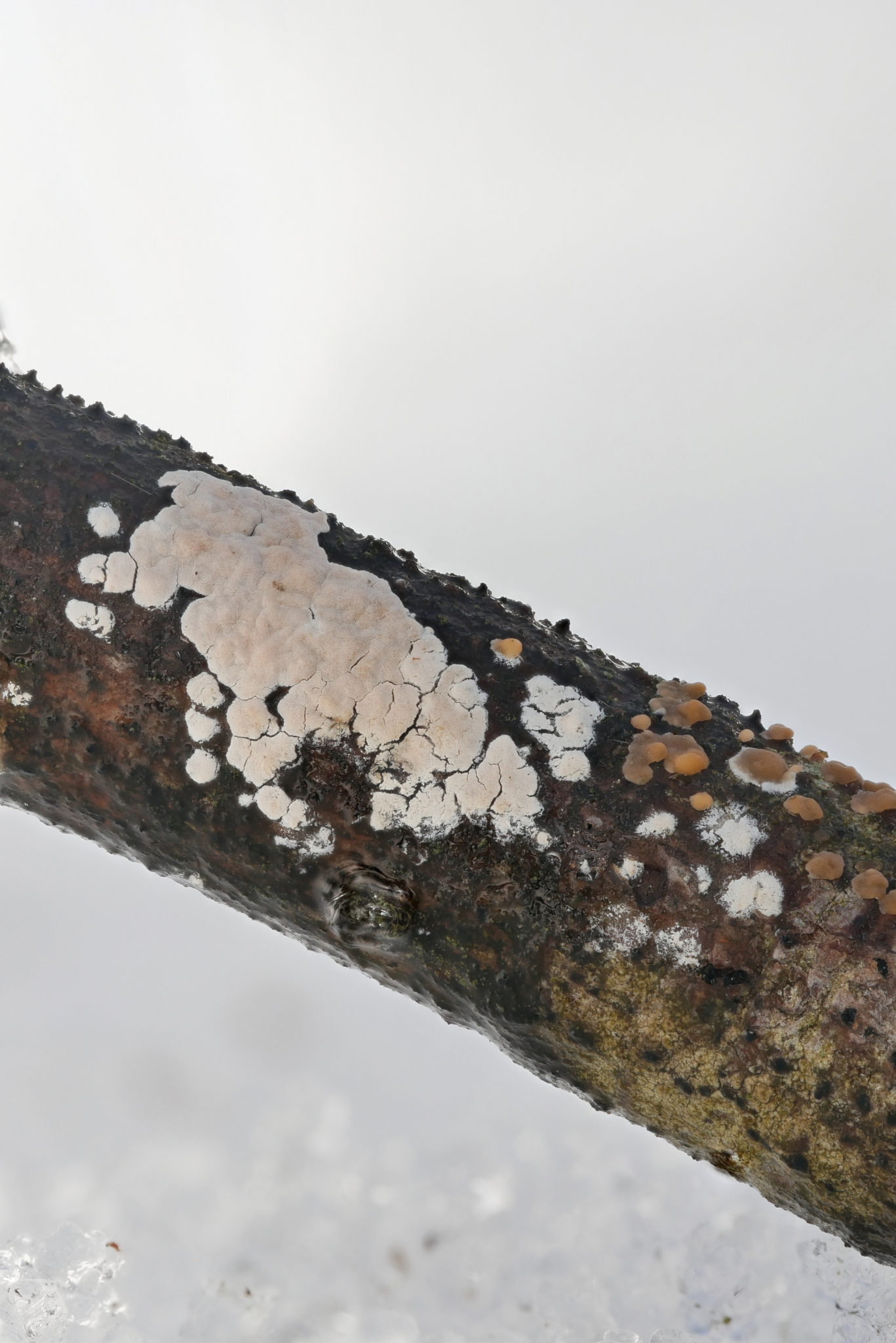

Scientific classification
- Kingdom: Fungi
- Division: Basidiomycota
- Class: Agaricomycetes
- Order: Corticiales
- Family: Corticiaceae
- Genus: Corticium
- Species: C. roseum

Binomial name
- Corticium roseum Pers. (1794)

Synonyms
- Aleurodiscus roseus (Pers.) Höhn. & Litsch. (1906); Athelia rosea (Pers.) Chevall. (1826); Corticium erikssonii Jülich (1982); Corticium lombardiae (M.J. Larsen & Gilb.) Boidin & Lanq. Corticium roseolum Massee (1891); Himantia rosea (Pers.) Fr. (1821); Hypochnus roseus (Pers.) J. Schröt. (1889); Laeticorticium lombardiae M.J. Larsen & Gilb. (1978); Laeticorticium pulverulentum J. Erikss. & Ryvarden (1977); Laeticorticium roseum (Pers.) Donk (1956); Lyomyces roseus (Pers.) P. Karst. (1882); Peniophora rosea (Pers.) Massee (1890); Terana rosea (Pers.) Kuntze (1891); Thelephora rosea (Pers.) Pers. (1801)

= Corticium roseum =

Species of fungus

Corticium roseum is a species of fungus in the family Corticiaceae. Basidiocarps (fruit bodies) are effused, smooth, corticioid, and pink. The species has a wide, north and south temperate distribution and in Europe is typically found on dead, attached branches of Salix and Populus.

== Taxonomy ==
Corticium roseum was originally described by Persoon in 1794 as part of his new genus Corticium. It was later selected as the type species of the genus. Morphological differences between collections indicated that C. roseum might be a species complex and several new species were described. Molecular research, based on cladistic analysis of DNA sequences, has partly confirmed this. Corticium boreoroseum, C. medioroseum, and C. malagasoroseum are separate species, based on DNA evidence, whilst C. erikssonii and C. lombardiae are synonyms of C. roseum.
