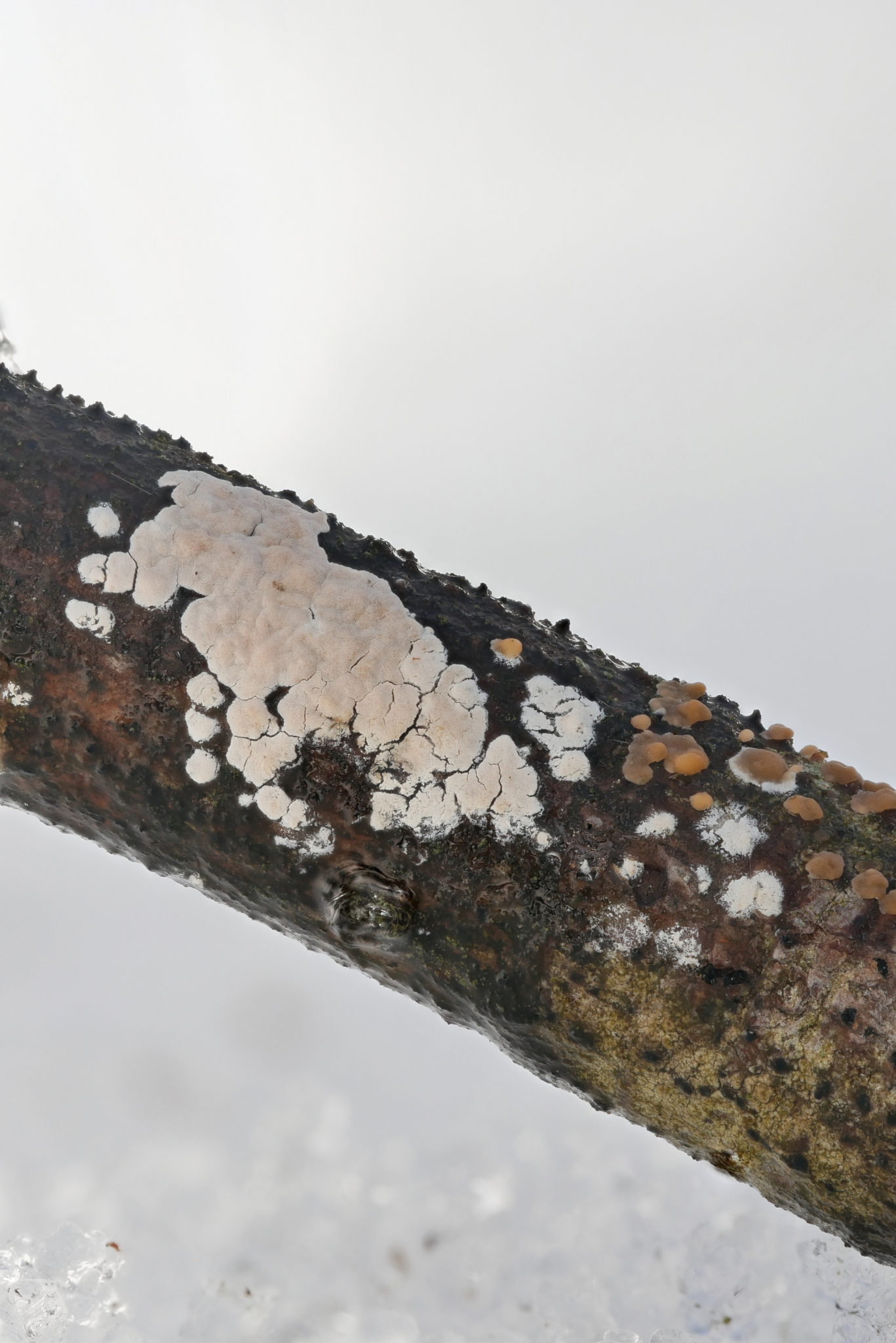
- Corticium roseum

Scientific classification
- Kingdom: Fungi
- Division: Basidiomycota
- Class: Agaricomycetes
- Order: Corticiales
- Family: Corticiaceae
- Genus: Corticium; Pers. (1794)

Type species
- Corticium roseum Pers. (1794)

Species
- Corticium appalachiense; Corticium boreoroseum; Corticium canfieldii; Corticium durangense; Corticium floridense; Corticium griseoeffusum; Corticium malagasoroseum; Corticium meridioroseum; Corticium minnsiae; Corticium mississippiense; Corticium pini; Corticium silviae; Corticium thailandicum

Synonyms
- Laeticorticium Donk (1956)

= Corticium (fungus) =

Genus of fungi

Corticium is a genus of fungi in the family Corticiaceae. Basidiocarps (fruit bodies) are effused, corticioid, smooth, and grow on dead wood. One species, C. silviae, is lichenicolous. The genus was formerly used in a very wide sense for almost any effused corticioid fungi.

== Taxonomy ==
=== History ===
The genus Corticium was established by Persoon in 1794 for fungi having smooth, effused fruit bodies. Corticium roseum was later selected as the type species. Subsequent authors described over 1000 species in the genus which continued to be used in its wide sense up until the 1950s. Though a number of genera had been recognized as distinct from Corticium from the late nineteenth century onwards, it was not until Swedish mycologist John Eriksson reviewed the corticioid fungi in a series of publications starting in 1950 that modern concepts were formed.

The genus Corticium was still retained, but restricted to a few species considered to be related to the type species.

=== Current status ===
Molecular research, based on cladistic analysis of DNA sequences, has shown that Corticium is a natural (monophyletic) taxon, but that not all species previously considered to belong within the genus (in its strict sense) are closely related. Several have been moved to other genera within the Corticiaceae.
