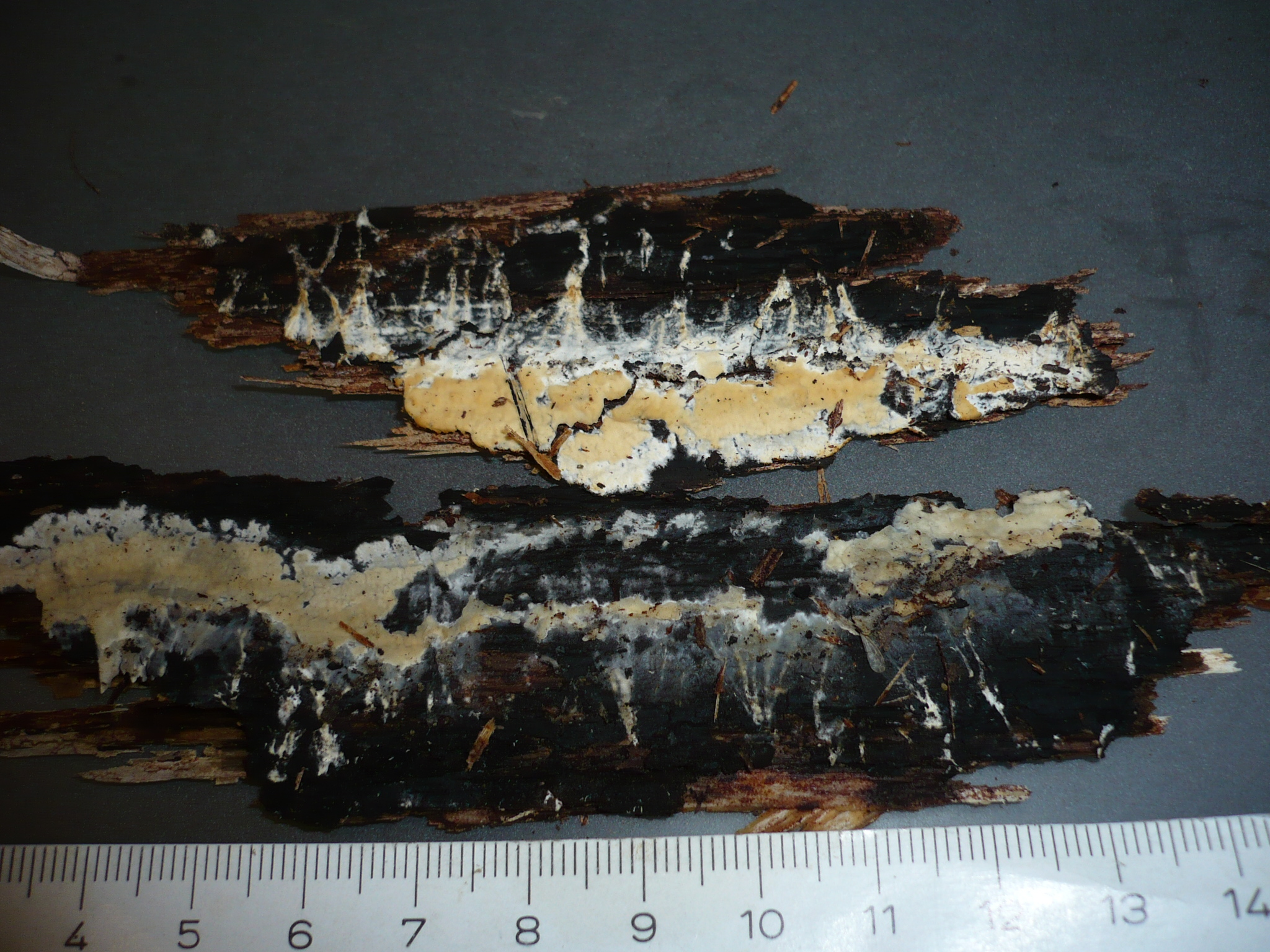
- Mutatoderma mutatum

Scientific classification
- Kingdom: Fungi
- Division: Basidiomycota
- Class: Agaricomycetes
- Order: Corticiales
- Family: Corticiaceae
- Genus: Mutatoderma (Parmasto) C.E. Gómez

Type species
- Mutatoderma mutatum (Peck) C.E. Gómez

Species
- M. brunneocontextum M. heterocystidium M. mutatum M. populneum

= Mutatoderma =

Genus of fungi

Mutatoderma is a genus of fungi in the family Corticiaceae. The widespread genus contains four species.
