= Pink disease =

Pink disease can refer to:

- Acrodynia, a condition caused by mercury poisoning, also known as pink disease
- Erythricium salmonicolor, a fungal plant pathogen causing pink disease in many commercial fruit trees
