= Disporotrichum =

Scientific classification
- Kingdom: Fungi
- Division: Basidiomycota
- Class: Agaricomycetes
- Order: Corticiales
- Family: Corticiaceae
- Genus: Disporotrichum; Stalpers (1984)

Type species
- Disporotrichum dimorphosporum

Genus of fungi

Disporotrichum is a genus of anamorphic fungi in the family Corticiaceae. The genus is monotypic, containing the single species Disporotrichum dimorphosporum which is used in the food industry as an enzyme to produce non-alcoholic beverages, soft drinks, and bakery ingredients.
