= C14H18N4O3 =

The molecular formula C_{14}H_{18}N_{4}O_{3} (molar mass: 290.318 g/mol, exact mass: 290.1379 u) may refer to:

- Benomyl
- Trimethoprim (TMP)
