= Waitea =

Scientific classification
- Kingdom: Fungi
- Division: Basidiomycota
- Class: Agaricomycetes
- Order: Corticiales
- Family: Corticiaceae
- Genus: Waitea; Warcup & P.H.B. Talbot (1962)

Type species
- Waitea circinata Warcup & P.H.B. Talbot (1962)

Species
- Waitea agrostidis J.A. Crouch & Cubeta (2021); Waitea arvalis (Burds.) Ghobad-Nejhad (2020); Waitea guianensis G. Gruhn & Ghobad-Nejhad (2020); Waitea oryzae J.A. Crouch & Cubeta (2021); Waitea prodiga J.A. Crouch & Cubeta (2021); Waitea zeae (Voorhees) J.A. Crouch & Cubeta (2021)

Synonyms
- Chrysorhiza T.F. Andersen & Stalpers (1996)

Genus of fungi

Waitea is a genus of fungi in the family Corticiaceae. Basidiocarps (fruit bodies) are corticioid, thin, effused, and web-like, but species are more frequently encountered in their similar but sterile anamorphic states. Several species are plant pathogens, causing commercially significant damage to cereal crops and amenity turf grass.
