= Tretopileus =

Scientific classification
- Kingdom: Fungi
- Division: Basidiomycota
- Class: Agaricomycetes
- Order: Corticiales
- Family: Corticiaceae
- Genus: Tretopileus; B.O. Dodge

Type species
- Tretopileus opuntiae B.O. Dodge

Species
- T. indicus T. opuntiae T. sphaerophorus

Genus of fungi

Tretopileus is a genus of fungi in the family Corticiaceae. The genus contains three species found in the US and Africa.
