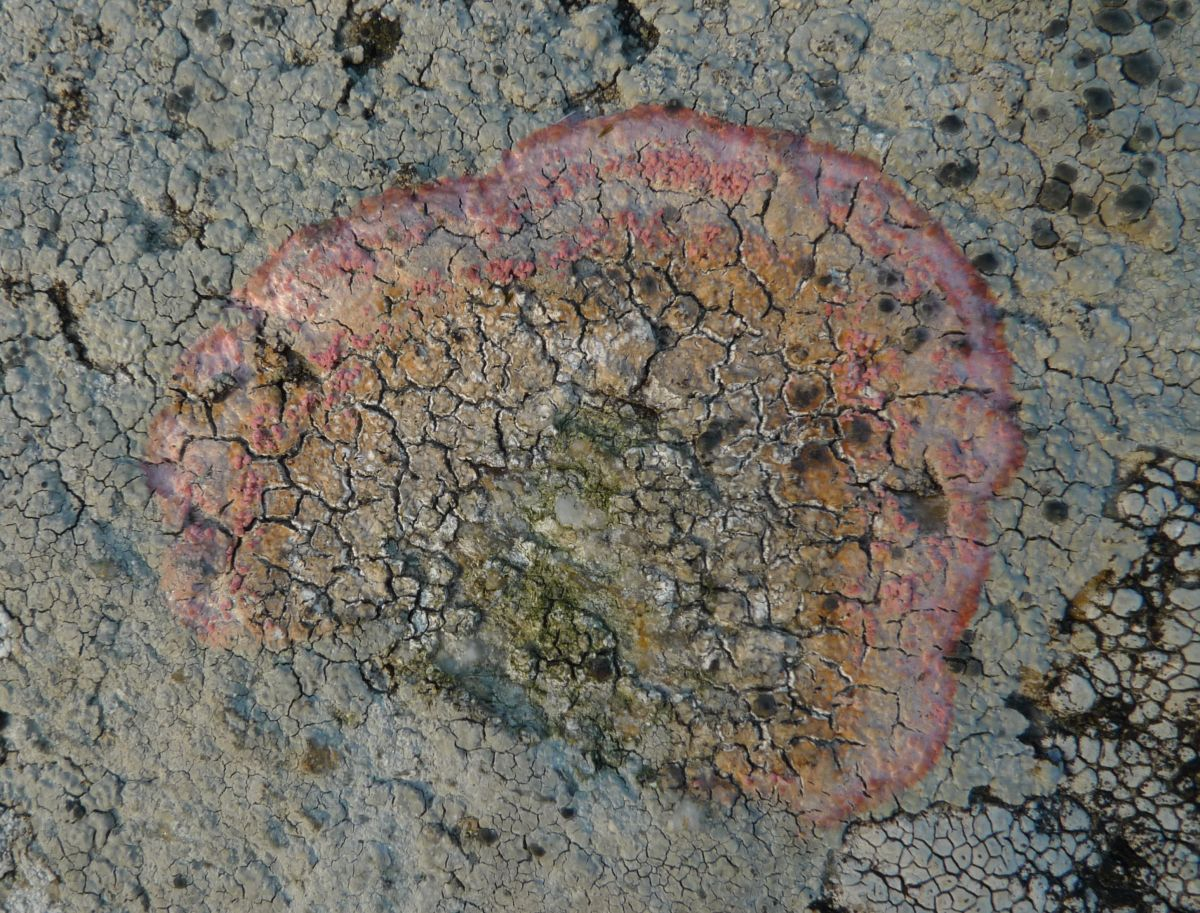

Scientific classification
- Domain: Eukaryota
- Kingdom: Fungi
- Division: Basidiomycota
- Class: Agaricomycetes
- Order: Corticiales
- Family: Corticiaceae
- Genus: Marchandiomyces
- Species: M. corallinus

Binomial name
- Marchandiomyces corallinus (Roberge) Diederich & D.Hawksw. (1990)

Synonyms
- Illosporium corallinum Roberge (1847)

= Marchandiomyces corallinus =

Species of fungus

Marchandiomyces corallinus is a lichenicolous fungus that parasitizes lichens, particularly those in the genera Physcia, Parmelia, Flavoparmelia, Lepraria, Pertusaria, Lasallia, and Lecanora. It is commonly found in eastern North America and Europe.

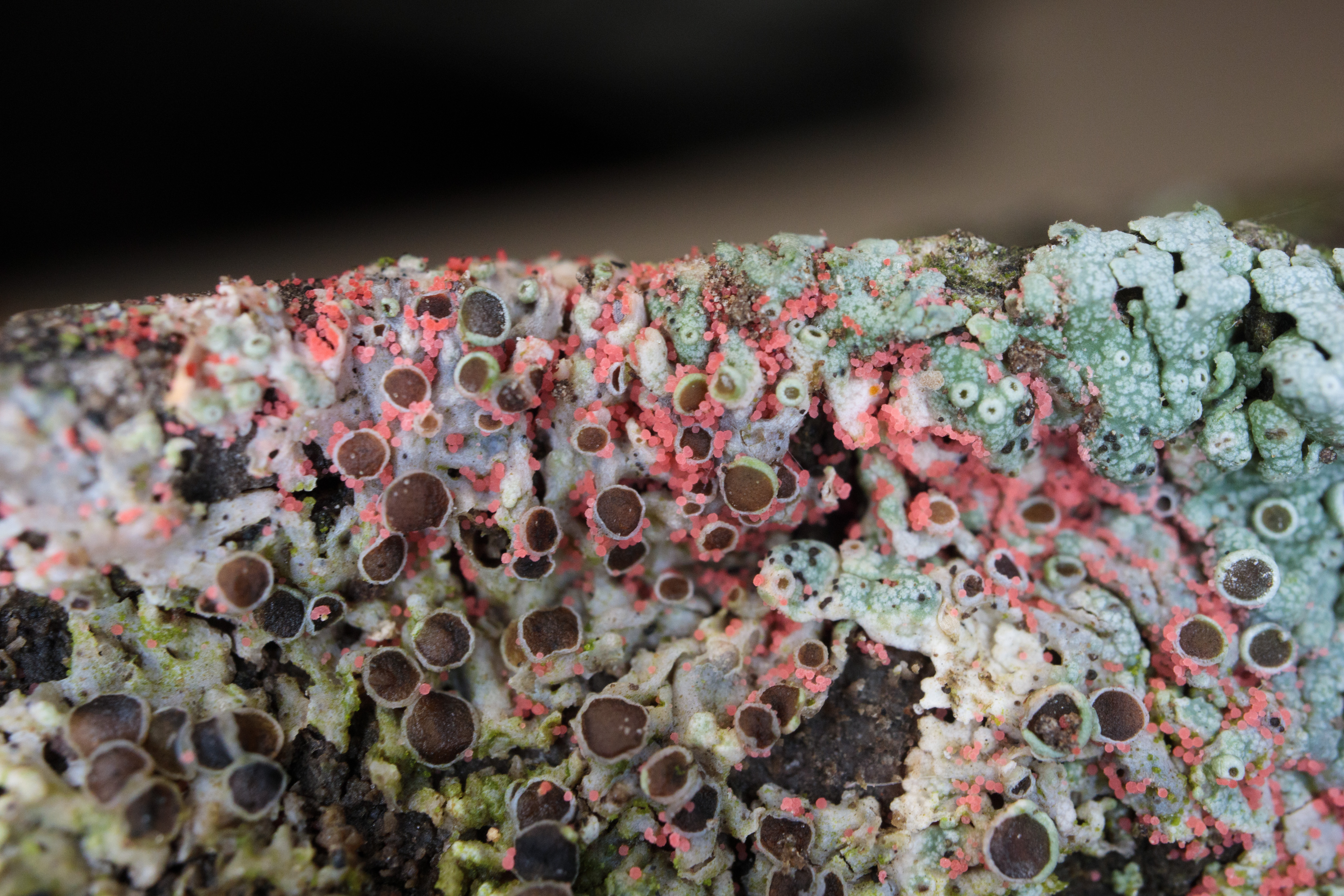
Marchandiomyces corallinus growing on Physcia sp.

== Parasitism ==
Despite most lichen parasites belonging to the phylum Ascomycota (95%), M. corallinus is in the phylum Basidiomycota.
