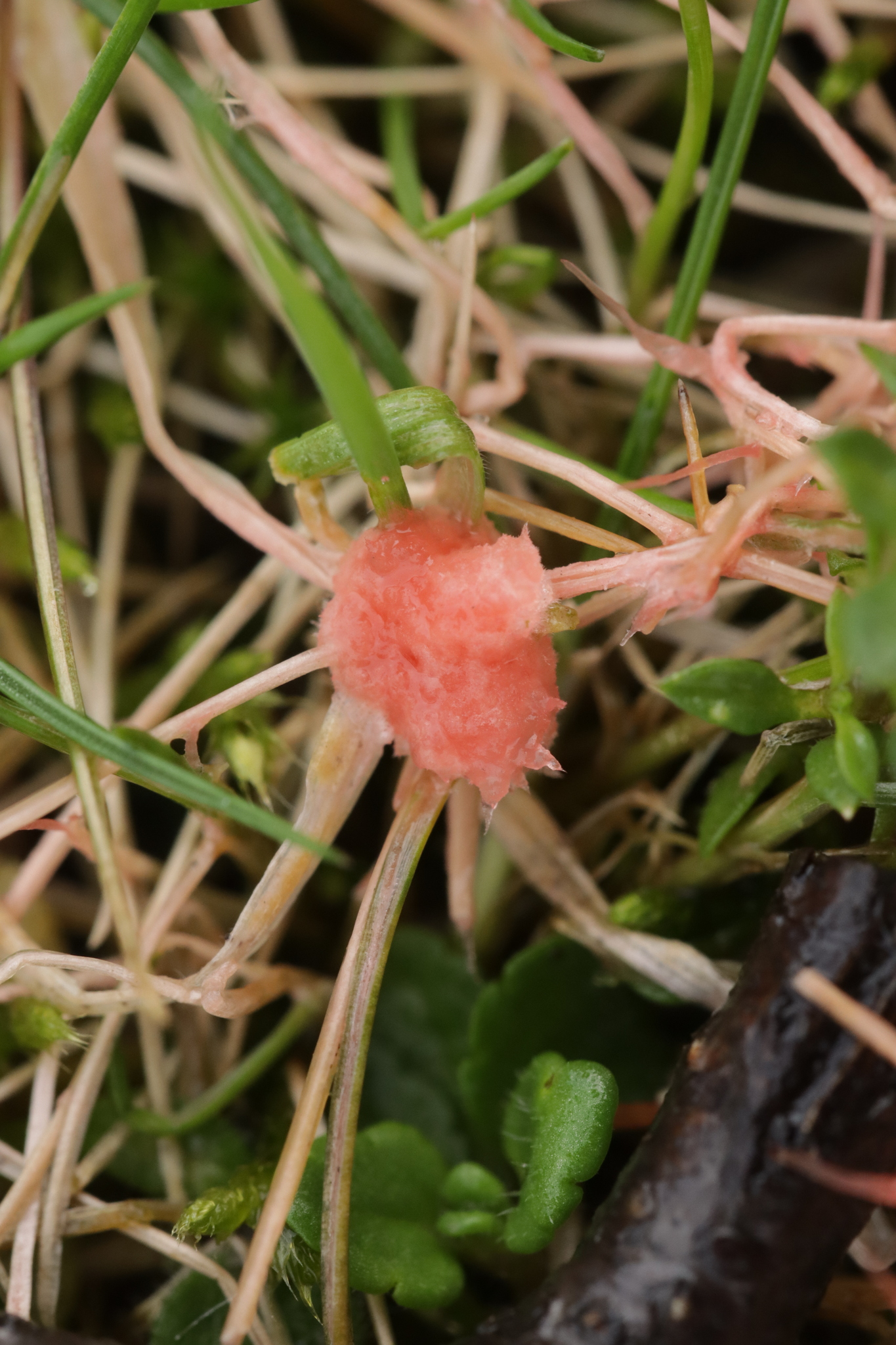
- Laetisaria fuciformis

Scientific classification
- Kingdom: Fungi
- Division: Basidiomycota
- Class: Agaricomycetes
- Order: Corticiales
- Family: Corticiaceae
- Genus: Laetisaria; Burds. (1979)

Type species
- Laetisaria fuciformis (McAlpine) Burds. (1979)

Species
- Laetisaria agaves; Laetisaria buckii; Laetisaria culmigena; Laetisaria endoxylon; Laetisaria lichenicola; Laetisaria lignigena; Laetisaria marsonii; Laetisaria nothofagicola; Laetisaria roseipellis

Synonyms
- Limonomyces Stalpers & Loer (1982)

= Laetisaria =

Genus of fungi

Laetisaria is a genus of fungi in the family Corticiaceae. Basidiocarps (fruit bodies) are effused, corticioid, smooth, and grow as plant pathogens on grasses or agave leaves, or as lichenicolous fungi on lichens, or on dead wood. Laetisaria fuciformis is of economic importance as the cause of "red thread disease" in turfgrass.
