= Dendrominiaceae =

Scientific classification
- Kingdom: Fungi
- Division: Basidiomycota
- Class: Agaricomycetes
- Order: Corticiales
- Family: Dendrominiaceae; Ghobad-Nejhad (2015)

Type genus
- Dendrominia Ghobad-Nejhad & Duhem (2013)

Family of fungi

The Dendrominiaceae are a family of fungi in the order Corticiales.

The family contains the single genus Dendrominia comprising four species of effused, corticioid fungi:

- Dendrominia burdsallii
- Dendrominia dryina
- Dendrominia ericae
- Dendrominia maculata
