= Waitea circinata =

Scientific classification
- Kingdom: Fungi
- Division: Basidiomycota
- Class: Agaricomycetes
- Order: Corticiales
- Family: Corticiaceae
- Genus: Waitea
- Species: W. circinata

Binomial name
- Waitea circinata Warcup & P.H.B. Talbot (1962)

Species of fungus

Waitea circinata is a species of fungus in the family Corticiaceae. Basidiocarps (fruit bodies) are corticioid, thin, effused, and web-like, but the fungus is more frequently encountered in its similar but sterile anamorphic state. Waitea circinata is best known as a plant pathogen, causing commercially significant damage (brown ring patch) to amenity turf grass.

== Taxonomy ==
Waitea circinata was originally described from Australia in 1962, where it was found growing on the undersides of clods of earth in a wheat field. The new genus Waitea, named after the Waite Agricultural Research Institute in Adelaide, was created to accommodate the species. Because of its morphological similarity to species of Rhizoctonia, Waitea circinata was presumed to belong within the Ceratobasidiaceae, but phylogenetic analysis of DNA sequences has shown that it actually belongs in the Corticiaceae and is close to species of Laetisaria (which are also grass pathogens).

Molecular research has also shown that Waitea circinata is part of a complex of at least four genetically distinct taxa, each causing visibly different diseases. These taxa were initially treated as varieties of W. circinata, but have now been described as separate species. Older references to W. circinata may refer to any or all of these species.

== Description ==
Basidiocarps are effused, thin, web-like, smooth, white to pale ochre. Hyphae are multinucleate, colourless, often irregular, 2.5-11 μm wide, without clamp connections. Basidia are often constricted about the middle, with four short sterigmata. Basidiospores are smooth, oblong to cylindrical, 8-12 by 3.5-5 μm, colourless to pale ochre. Sclerotia are pinkish orange to brown, 0.5–3 mm wide.

== Habitat and distribution ==
The species appears to be a soil saprotroph, principally associated with grasses, possibly always as a pathogen. Though first described from Australia, it has a cosmopolitan distribution and has been recorded from Europe, North America, Asia, and New Zealand.

== Economic importance ==
Waitea circinata is the causal agent of brown ring patch (also called Waitea patch) of amenity turf grasses.
