= Erythricium salmonicolor =

Scientific classification
- Kingdom: Fungi
- Division: Basidiomycota
- Class: Agaricomycetes
- Order: Corticiales
- Family: Corticiaceae
- Genus: Erythricium
- Species: E. salmonicolor

Binomial name
- Erythricium salmonicolor (Berk. & Broome) Burds. (1985)

Synonyms
- Corticium salmonicolor Berk. & Broome (1875); Terana salmonicolor (Berk. & Broome) Kuntze (1891); Pellicularia salmonicolor (Berk. & Broome) Dastur (1946); Phanerochaete salmonicolor (Berk. & Broome) Jülich (1975); Necator decretus Massee (1891)

Species of fungus

Erythricium salmonicolor is a species of fungus in the family Corticiaceae. Basidiocarps are effused, corticioid, smooth, and pinkish and grow on wood. The fungus is a commercially significant plant pathogen which has become a serious problem, especially in Brazil. Erythricium salmonicolor causes Pink Disease, most commonly in Citrus, although E. salmonicolor has a wide host range including rubber and cacao trees. Pink Disease causes branch and stem die-back due to canker formation. The cankers are recognizable by gum exudation and longitudinal splitting of the bark.

== Hosts and symptoms ==
Erythricium salmonicolor has a very broad host range. The host plants of greatest importance include rubber, tea, coffee, cacao, grapefruit, orange, nutmeg, mango, apple, coca, and kola. In countries like Malaysia and New Guinea, Pink disease also impacts certain cover crops and shade trees such as pigeon pea, Crotalaria, Tephrosia, Leucaena, and Gliricidia. Pink Disease can cause heavy losses including individual branch death to the loss of the whole tree in cases where the main stem or several branches are affected. E. salmonicolor causes girdling cankers which prevent the normal function of some physiological processes, eventually leading to defoliation and die-back of outer branches. On rubber trees, initial stages of infection appear as drops of latex and silky-white mycelial growth on the bark surface. In black pepper plants, sterile pink to white pustules approximately 1 mm in diameter appear on young green stems. On Acacia, early stages of infection appear as silky-like white mycelial growth, known as the 'cobweb stage', which impact the branches and stems. In citrus trees, sterile pustules may appear first, and in some cases the trees may have oozing sap or gum. In cacao trees, first symptoms of infection usually present as a sparse white mycelium on the bark surface, which can be easily overlooked. Trees are most susceptible in areas with high levels of rainfall, such as tropical rainforests. Diagnosis of Pink Disease is typically achieved through the use of light microscopy and scanning electron microscopy to observe sporulation of the pathogen.

== Management and control ==
Management of E. salmonicolor and Pink Disease can be very difficult given its wide host range, making cross-infection a concern. Cultural control can be implemented by pruning frequently and burning any infected branches removed. This is effective when the disease can be recognized in the earliest stages, but it is most effective when performed concurrently with fungicide application. The encrustation and conidial pustules are able to remain functional for a period of time after the infected branches have been removed from the tree. Fungicide use varies among countries affected by the disease. In India, pre- and post-monsoon application of fungicides directly on the trunk and branches of cocoa or rubber trees effectively prevented the disease, while application of a sulphur-lime slurry to tea shrubs worked best in Kalimantan in Borneo, and Validamycin A was found to be the most effective means of control on rubber trees in Vietnam. The use of fungicides prevents the basidiospores from germinating and causing infection.

== Importance ==
Erythricium salmonicolor is of particular importance in areas such as Colombia, China, or Thailand, that rely on the export of globally important crops like coffee, tea, or rubber respectively. In cocoa, there have been reported losses of 80% or more in Western Samoa. In Ghana, E. salmonicolor is of significant importance, as the country is the second largest producer of cocoa worldwide, as well as where cocoa was introduced as a crop in 1878. Young trees are particularly affected by the disease, as Pink Disease typically does not kill mature trees it infects. in citrus trees in Brazil, E. salmonicolor has been shown to be responsible for reduction of citrus production by up to 10%.

== See also ==
- List of cacao diseases
- List of citrus diseases
- List of coffee diseases
- List of mango diseases
- List of tea diseases
