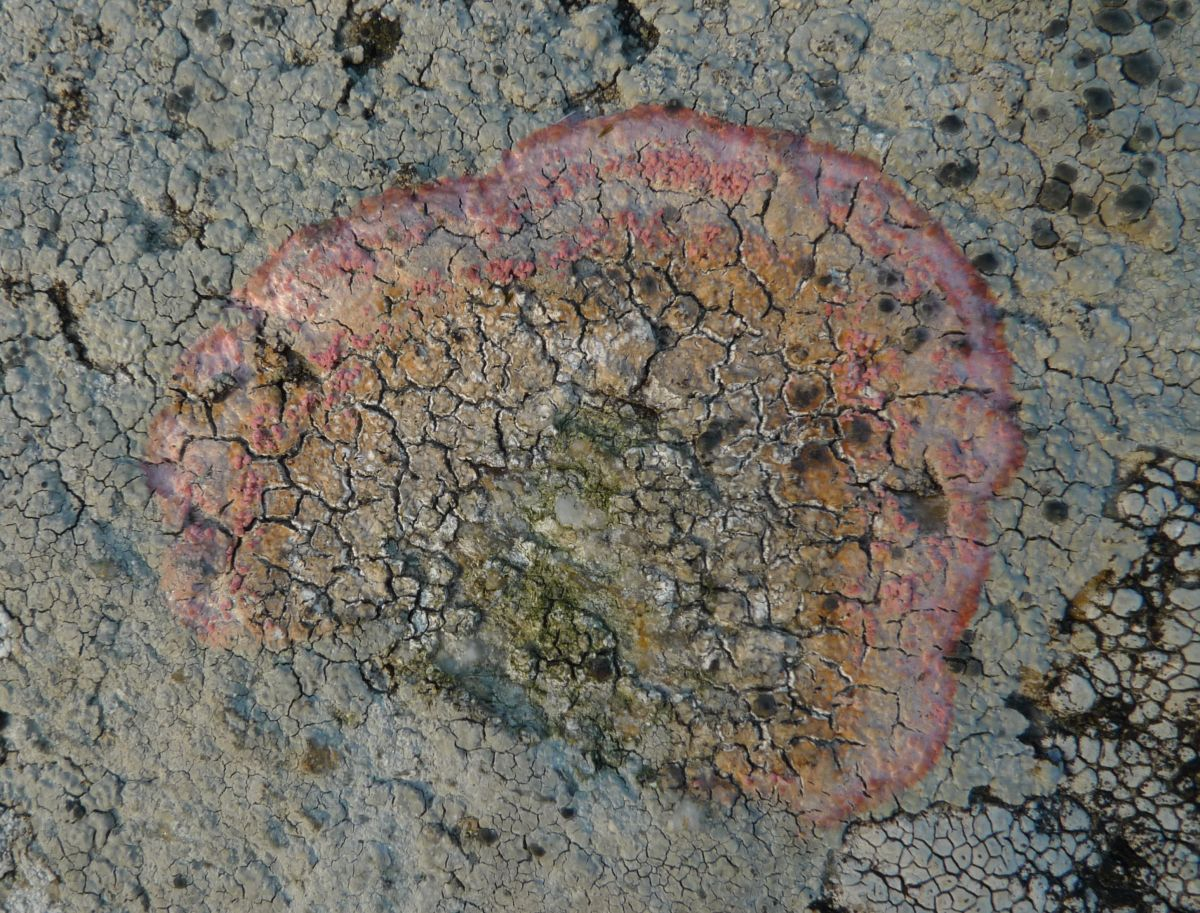
- Marchandiomyces corallinus

Scientific classification
- Kingdom: Fungi
- Division: Basidiomycota
- Class: Agaricomycetes
- Order: Corticiales
- Family: Corticiaceae
- Genus: Marchandiomyces; Diederich & D.Hawksw. (1990)

Type species
- Marchandiomyces corallinus

Species
- M. allantosporus M. aurantioroseus M. corallinus M. lignicola M. quercinus

Synonyms
- Marchandiopsis Ghobad-Nejhad & Hallenb. (2010)

= Marchandiomyces =

Family of fungi

Marchandiomyces is a genus of fungi in the family Corticiaceae.

Marchandiomyces is named in honour of Louis (Ludwig) Marchand (1807-1843), who was a Luxembourger veterinarian, mycologist, lichenologist, and author.

Marchandiomyces corallinus is a lichenicolous species especially found on lichens of the genus Parmelia. Other species are lignicolous, forming inconspicuous, effused basidiocarps (fruit bodies) on wood.
