= Carbendazim =

Names
- Preferred IUPAC name Methyl (1H-1,3-benzimidazol-2-yl)carbamate
- Other names Mercarzole; Carbendazole

Identifiers
CAS Number	10605-21-7
3D model (JSmol)	Interactive image
ChEBI	CHEBI:3392
ChEMBL	ChEMBL70971
ChemSpider	23741
ECHA InfoCard	100.031.108
KEGG	C10897
PubChem CID	25429
RTECS number	DD6500000
UNII	H75J14AA89
CompTox Dashboard (EPA)	DTXSID4024729
- InChI: InChI=1S/C9H9N3O2/c1-14-9(13)12-8-10-6-4-2-3-5-7(6)11-8/h2-5H,1H3,(H2,10,11,12,13) Key: TWFZGCMQGLPBSX-UHFFFAOYSA-N; InChI=1/C9H9N3O2/c1-14-9(13)12-8-10-6-4-2-3-5-7(6)11-8/h2-5H,1H3,(H2,10,11,12,13) Key: TWFZGCMQGLPBSX-UHFFFAOYAS
- SMILES: COC(=O)Nc2nc1ccccc1[nH]2

Properties
Chemical formula	C_{9}H_{9}N_{3}O_{2}
Molar mass	191.187 g/mol
Appearance	White to light gray powder
Density	1.45 g/cm^{3}
Melting point	302 to 307 °C (576 to 585 °F; 575 to 580 K) (decomposes)
Solubility in water	8 mg/L Disintegration = 302 -305 degree Temperature of disintegration = 1.5 - 2 hrs
Acidity (pK_{a})	4.48

Hazards
- NIOSH (US health exposure limits)
PEL (Permissible)	Disintegration temp = 302 - 305 degree Disintegration temp = 1.5 - 2 hrs
- Except where otherwise noted, data are given for materials in their standard state (at 25 °C [77 °F], 100 kPa). verify (what is ?) Infobox references

Carbendazim is a systematic benzimidazole fungicide of the carbamate class and a metabolite of the fungicide benomyl. It is used to control fungal diseases in cereals and fruits, including citrus, bananas, strawberries, macadamia nuts, pineapples, and pomes. A 4.7% solution of carbendazim hydrochloride, sold as Eertavas, is marketed as a treatment for Dutch elm disease.

== Other uses ==
It is also employed as a casting worm control agent in amenity turf situations such as golf greens, tennis courts etc. and in some countries is licensed for that use only.

== Safety, regulation, controversy ==
High doses of carbendazim destroy the testicles of laboratory animals.

Maximum pesticide residue limits (MRLs) for fresh produce in the EU are between 0.1 and 0.7 mg/kg with the exception of loquat fruits, which is set at 2 mg/kg. The limits for more commonly consumed citrus and pome fruits are between 0.1 and 0.2 mg/kg.

Use of this fungicide on macadamia plantations has proven controversial in Queensland.

It is used in Australia, Uganda, and the USA.
