= Thiophanate-methyl =

Names
- Preferred IUPAC name Dimethyl N,N′-[1,2-phenylenebis(azanediylcarbonothioyl)]dicarbamate
- Other names Dimethyl 4,4′-(o-phenylene)bis(3-thioallophanate)

Identifiers
CAS Number	23564-05-8
3D model (JSmol)	Interactive image
ChemSpider	2297683
ECHA InfoCard	100.041.567
PubChem CID	3032791
UNII	K4N81R84L8
CompTox Dashboard (EPA)	DTXSID1024338
- InChI: InChI=1S/C12H14N4O4S2/c1-19-11(17)15-9(21)13-7-5-3-4-6-8(7)14-10(22)16-12(18)20-2/h3-6H,1-2H3,(H2,13,15,17,21)(H2,14,16,18,22) Key: QGHREAKMXXNCOA-UHFFFAOYSA-N
- SMILES: COC(=O)NC(=S)NC1=CC=CC=C1NC(=S)NC(=O)OC

Properties
Chemical formula	C_{12}H_{14}N_{4}O_{4}S_{2}
Molar mass	342.39 g·mol^{−1}
Appearance	white powder
Melting point	172 °C (342 °F; 445 K)
Solubility in water	26.6 mg/L
- Except where otherwise noted, data are given for materials in their standard state (at 25 °C [77 °F], 100 kPa). Infobox references

Thiophanate-methyl is an organic compound with the formula C_{6}H_{4}(NHC(S)NH(CO)OCH_{3})_{2}. The compound is a colorless or white solid, although commercial samples are generally tan-colored. It is prepared from o-phenylenediamine. It is a widely used fungicide used on tree, vine, and root crops. In Europe it is applied to tomato, wine grapes, beans, wheat, and aubergine.

Methods for its analysis have received considerable attention. It is commonly used to treat botrytis bunch rot and gray mold caused by Botrytis cinerea strawberry in California. Thiophanate-methyl acts as a fungicide via its primary metabolite carbendazim.
