= Brown ring patch =

Fungal disease of turf grass

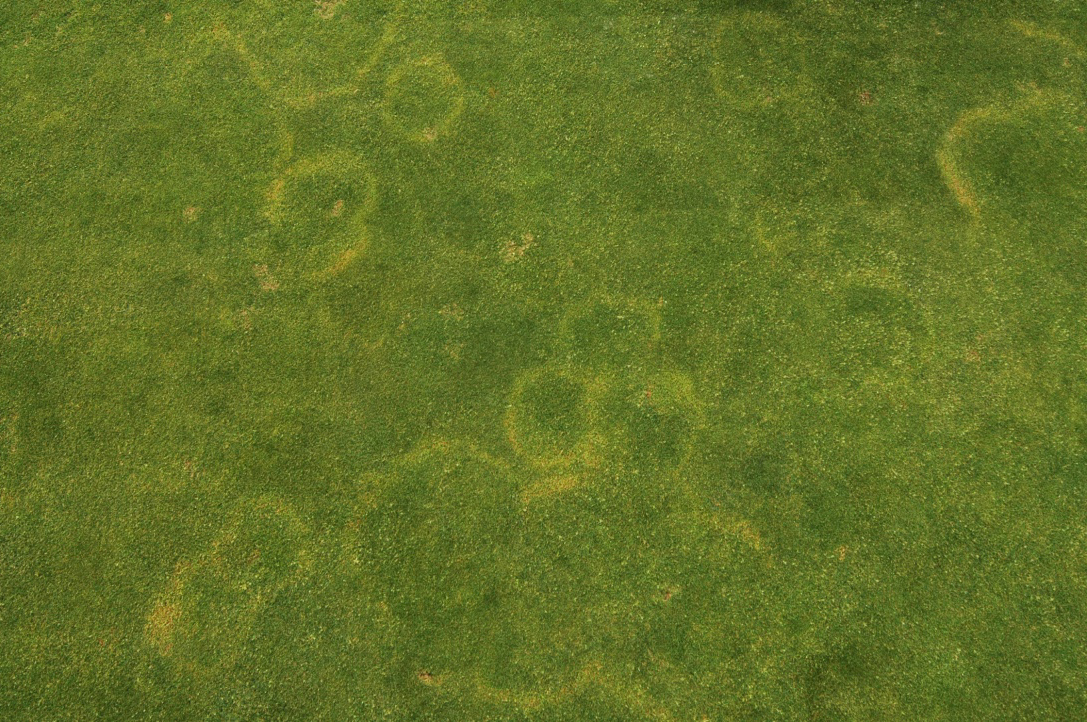

Brown ring patch is a recently described Rhizoctonia-like disease of turf grass caused by the fungus Waitea circinata var. circinata. The disease primarily affects putting greens and causes yellow or brown rings up to 1 metre (3.3 ft) in diameter. Brown ring patch was first observed in Japan and has since spread to the United States (approximately 2005) and China (2011).

== Hosts and symptoms ==
The fungus causing brown ring patch, Waitea circinata var. circinata, was first identified in Japan in 2005 damaging creeping bentgrass. The disease was thought to be restricted to Japan until its first report in the United States in 2007 infecting annual bluegrass.

There is typically a period of six weeks or more between first infection of the roots and the presentation of symptoms. The disease causes circular or scalloped rings in the turf up to 1 metre (3.3 ft) in diameter, with the width of the ring itself being up to 3 centimetres (1.2 in). The rings turn from yellow to light or reddish brown as the disease progresses. The disease is most noticeable on putting greens and commonly occurs in the spring with rising temperatures. Brown ring patch is similar to other Rhizoctonia species, but appears to infect upper roots, crowns, and stems as well as foliage of individual plants. It also degrades thatch, gives rise to sunken rings, and acts somewhat like superficial fairy ring.

== Environment ==
Brown ring patch is most destructive when the weather is humid and temperatures are stressful to the grass. Thus, in cool-season grasses such as tall fescue and perennial ryegrass, the disease is most severe under high temperatures (highs above 85 °F (29 °C), lows above 60 °F (16 °C)). Conversely, in warm-season grasses such as zoysia, Brown ring patch is most severe in humid weather with moderate temperatures (45–70 °F or 7–21 °C). This disease is limited to putting greens on golf courses and thrives in temperatures of 77–86 °F (25–30 °C). Brown ring patch can be found on annual bluegrass, creeping bentgrass, and rough bluegrass; it is diagnosed predominately during periods of high humidity or periods of extended leaf wetness. Soil temperatures of 55–60 °F (13–16 °C) are associated with initial disease development. The disease is more severe on greens which have low nitrogen fertility and often develops first on areas that are dry or have other environmental stresses.

== Management ==
Most fungicides labeled for control of Rhizoctonia spp. are active against brown ring patch. Research in 2008 demonstrated that 1 pound of nitrogen per 1,000 sq ft (nitrate, ammonium or urea) could reduce disease by 50 percent or more. Greens need to be maintained with adequate nitrogen. Cultural skills include reducing thatch aggressively by verticutting and/or aerifying in the spring and fall when the turf is actively growing, and raise the mowing height prior to and during summer stress periods. Verticutting uses a machine to cut straight lines into a lawn. The depth of these lines is variable and a by-product of the slicing action is known as de-thatching. A verticut machine, like the aerator, has several blades attached to a drum. These blades slice the ground producing a proper seed bed, or corn-row, while removing thatch along the way. Following these cultural practices that promote healthy turf will promote turf recovery. Preventive fungicide applications are recommended when soil temperatures are between 55–60 °F (13–16 °C). Brown ring patch is not controlled by thiophante-methyl or other benzimidazole fungicides. Fungicides can be applied in a water volume of 2 gal./1,000 sq. ft. and lightly watered in following application. Generally, curative applications are less effective, and repeated applications are often needed for complete control. Curative applications are best made as soon as symptoms are visible. The best treatment is to apply Medallion, polyoxin-D (e.g., Affirm and Endorse), ProStar, one of the QoI fungicides (e.g., Heritage or Insignia), Trinity, Triton Flo, and Torque now and repeat in two to three weeks to limit disease development later in the spring. Unlike yellow patch, brown ring patch can degrade the thatch in infested areas so fungicide applications are typically required to prevent significant damage.
