= Fuberidazole =

Names
- Preferred IUPAC name 2-(Furan-2-yl)-1H-1,3-benzimidazole

Identifiers
| CAS Number | 3878-19-1 |
| 3D model (JSmol) | Interactive image |
| ChEBI | CHEBI:81926 |
| ChemSpider | 18609 |
| ECHA InfoCard | 100.021.277 |
| PubChem CID | 19756 |
| UNII | RXD450F6C7 |
| CompTox Dashboard (EPA) | DTXSID4041995 |
- InChI: InChI=1S/C11H8N2O/c1-2-5-9-8(4-1)12-11(13-9)10-6-3-7-14-10/h1-7H,(H,12,13) Key: UYJUZNLFJAWNEZ-UHFFFAOYSA-N; InChI=1/C11H8N2O/c1-2-5-9-8(4-1)12-11(13-9)10-6-3-7-14-10/h1-7H,(H,12,13) Key: UYJUZNLFJAWNEZ-UHFFFAOYAP
- SMILES: n2c1c(cccc1)[nH]c2c3occc3

Properties
| Chemical formula | C_{11}H_{8}N_{2}O |
| Molar mass | 184.198 g·mol^{−1} |
- Except where otherwise noted, data are given for materials in their standard state (at 25 °C [77 °F], 100 kPa). Infobox references

Fuberidazole (chemical formula: C_{11}H_{8}N_{2}O) is a chemical compound used in fungicides.
