= John Eriksson (mycologist) =

Swedish mycologist (1921–1995)

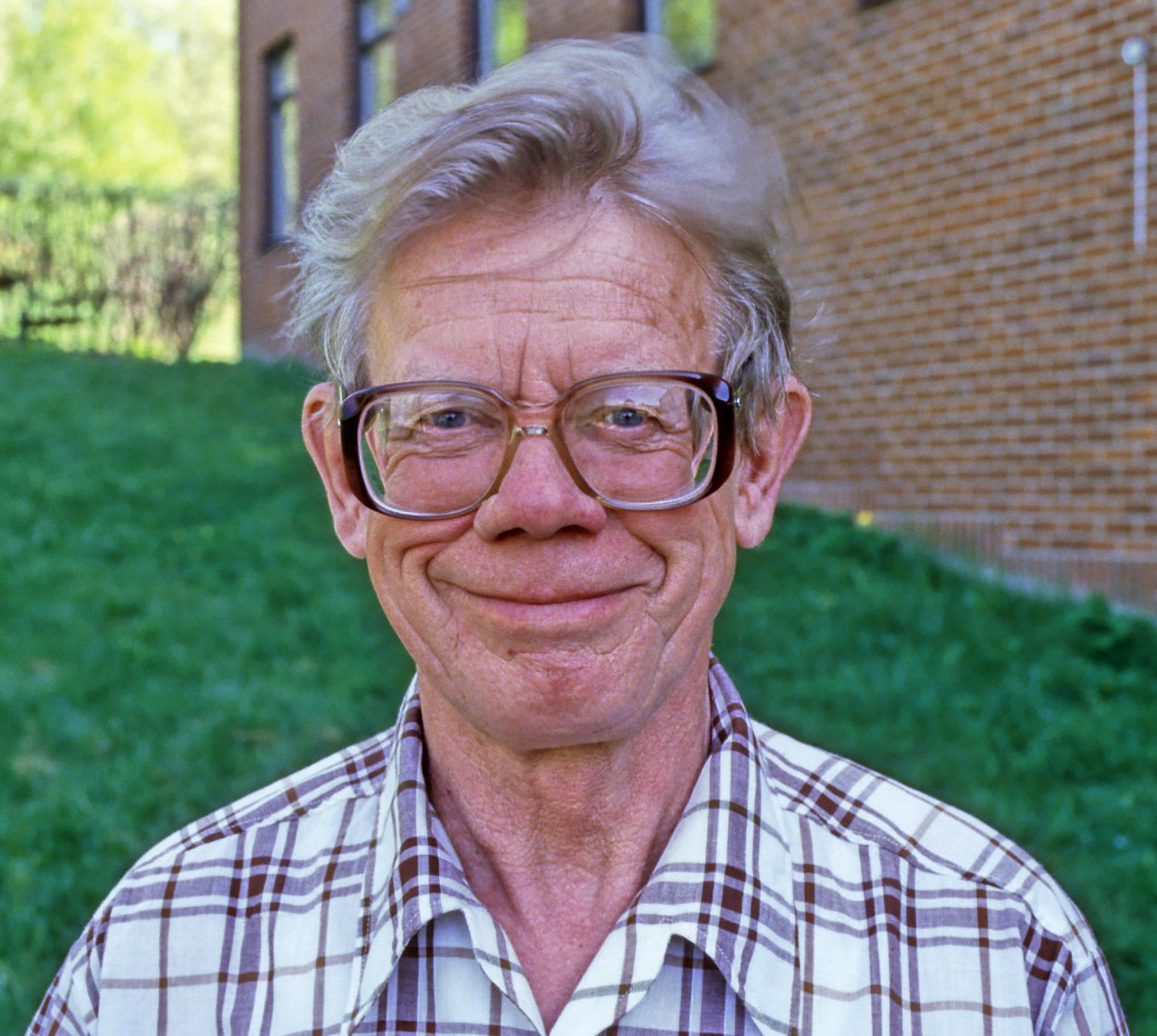
John Eriksson at the University of Gothenburg in 1985

John Leonard Eriksson (26 March 1921 in Hagfors – 1 June 1995) was a Swedish mycologist. He specialized in crust fungi of the basidiomycetes, collecting in Sweden (especially in Muddus National Park, the Gothenburg region and Värnamo), Finland and Canada.

Eriksson was a student of John Axel Nannfeldt and Seth Lundell, and defended his doctoral dissertation Studies in the Heterobasidiomycetes and Homobasidiomycetes-Aphyllophorales of Muddus National Park in Northern Sweden[3] on the wood-associated fungal flora in Muddus National Park at Uppsala University in 1958. The opponent (similar to an external examiner) was the Dutch mycologist Marinus Donk.

Eriksson was employed as a senior lecturer at the University of Gothenburg in 1961. He received a personal doctorate in 1967 which was transformed into a professorship in 1977. Eriksson retired in 1986.

Eriksson supervised several students who would later carry on the crust fungus tradition, including Nils Hallenberg and Karl-Henrik Larsson. Eriksson also had extensive scientific collaborations with Kurt Hjortstam and Leif Ryvarden.

Eriksson was the main author and illustrator of the book series The Corticiaceae of North Europe (1973–1988, Fungiflora publishing house). Eriksson was known for his accurate and clear illustrations of micromorphological characters, a characteristic of this book series.

Eriksson described 16 genera (eg. Paullicorticium) and 55 species (eg. Phlebia firma), and he carried out 119 nomenclature recombinations. Nearly 10 species have been named after Eriksson, e.g. Xylodon erikssonii and Hypochnicium erikssonii.
