= Benomyl =

Names
- Preferred IUPAC name 1-(Butylcarbamoyl)-1H-1,3-benzimidazol-2-yl methylcarbamate
- Other names Benomyl

Identifiers
CAS Number	17804-35-2
3D model (JSmol)	Interactive image
Beilstein Reference	825455
ChEBI	CHEBI:3015
ChEMBL	ChEMBL327919
ChemSpider	26771
ECHA InfoCard	100.037.962
EC Number	241-775-7
KEGG	C10896
PubChem CID	28780
RTECS number	DD6475000
UNII	TLW21058F5
UN number	3077 2757
CompTox Dashboard (EPA)	DTXSID5023900
- InChI: InChI=1S/C14H18N4O3/c1-3-4-9-15-13(19)18-11-8-6-5-7-10(11)16-12(18)17-14(20)21-2/h5-8H,3-4,9H2,1-2H3,(H,15,19)(H,16,17,20) Key: RIOXQFHNBCKOKP-UHFFFAOYSA-N; InChI=1/C14H18N4O3/c1-3-4-9-15-13(19)18-11-8-6-5-7-10(11)16-12(18)17-14(20)21-2/h5-8H,3-4,9H2,1-2H3,(H,15,19)(H,16,17,20) Key: RIOXQFHNBCKOKP-UHFFFAOYAA
- SMILES: O=C(n1c2ccccc2nc1NC(=O)OC)NCCCC

Properties
Chemical formula	C_{14}H_{18}N_{4}O_{3}
Molar mass	290.323 g·mol^{−1}
Appearance	white crystalline solid
Odor	acrid
Melting point	290 °C (554 °F; 563 K) decomposes
Solubility in water	0.0004% (20 °C)

Hazards
- GHS labelling
Pictograms	(GHS06: Toxic) (GHS07: Exclamation mark) (GHS08: Health hazard) (GHS09: Environmental hazard)
Signal word	Danger
Hazard statements	H315, H317, H335, H340, H360, H410
Precautionary statements	P203, P261, P264, P271, P272, P273, P280, P302+P352, P304+P340, P316, P317, P318, P319, P321, P333+P317, P362+P364, P391, P403+P233, P405, P501
Flash point	noncombustible
- NIOSH (US health exposure limits)
PEL (Permissible)	TWA 15 mg/m^{3} (total) TWA 5 mg/m^{3} (resp)
REL (Recommended)	none
IDLH (Immediate danger)	N.D.
- Except where otherwise noted, data are given for materials in their standard state (at 25 °C [77 °F], 100 kPa). verify (what is ?) Infobox references

Benomyl (also marketed as Benlate) is a fungicide introduced in 1968 by DuPont. It is a systemic benzimidazole fungicide that is selectively toxic to microorganisms and invertebrates (especially earthworms), but relatively nontoxic toward mammals.

Due to the prevalence of resistance of parasitic fungi to benomyl, it and similar pesticides are of diminished effectiveness. Nonetheless, it is widely used.

== Toxicity ==
Benomyl is of low toxicity to mammals. It has an arbitrary LD_{50} of "greater than 10,000 mg/kg/day for rats". Skin irritation may occur through industrial exposure, and florists, mushroom pickers and floriculturists have reported allergic reactions to benomyl.

In a laboratory study, dogs fed benomyl in their diets for three months developed no major toxic effects, but did show evidence of altered liver function at the highest dose (150 mg/kg). With longer exposure, more severe liver damage occurred, including cirrhosis.

The US Environmental Protection Agency classified benomyl as a possible carcinogen. Carcinogenic studies have produced conflicting results. A two-year experimental study on mice has shown it "probably" causes an increase in liver tumours. The British Ministry of Agriculture Fisheries and Food took the view this was brought about by the hepatotoxic effect of benomyl.

In regards to occupational exposures to benomyl, the Occupational Safety and Health Administration has set a permissible exposure limit of 15 mg/m^{3} for total exposure over an eight-hour time-weighted average, and 5 mg/m^{3} for respiratory exposures.

=== Birth defects ===
In 1996, a Miami jury awarded US$4 million to a child whose mother was exposed in pregnancy to Benlate. The child was born with severe eye defects (clinical anophthalmia). The mother had been exposed to an unusually high dose of this compound through her exposure from a nearby farm, during pregnancy. An important issue in the case was the timing and magnitude of exposure.

In October 2008, DuPont paid confidential settlements to two New Zealand families whose children were born with various birth defects. The mother of one of the children had been exposed to Benlate while working as a Christchurch parks worker before his birth.

== Environmental effects ==
Benomyl binds strongly to soil and does not dissolve in water to any great extent. It has a half-life in turf of three to six months, and in bare soil, a half-life of six months to one year.

In 1991, DuPont issued a recall of its Benlate 50DF formula due to suspected contamination with the herbicide atrazine. In the wake of the recall, many US growers blamed Benlate 50DF for destroying millions of dollars' worth of crops. Growers filed over 1,900 damage claims against DuPont, mostly involving ornamental crops in Florida. Subsequent testing by DuPont determined the recalled product was not contaminated with atrazine. The reason for the alleged crop damage is unclear. The Florida Department of Agriculture and Consumer Services suggested Benlate was contaminated with dibutylurea and sulfonylurea herbicides.

After several years of legal argument, DuPont paid out about US$750 million in damages and out-of-court settlements. By 1993, a coalition of farm worker and environmental groups came together to form "Benlate Victims Against DuPont", a group which called for a nationwide boycott of DuPont products.

After carrying out tests, DuPont denied Benlate was contaminated with dibutylurea and sulfonylureas and stopped compensation pay-outs. In 1995, a Florida judge rejected a complaint from the Florida Department of Agriculture that had alleged such a link.

== Cellular biology ==
Benomyl is used in molecular biology to study the cell cycle in yeast; in fact, the name of the protein class "Bub" (Bub1, etc.) comes from their mutant in which budding was uninhibited by benomyl. Benomyl acts by depolymerizing microtubules. Benomyl is also useful in the laboratory because it is selectively toxic to most members of the Ascomycota, whereas members of the Basidiomycota are largely resistant.
