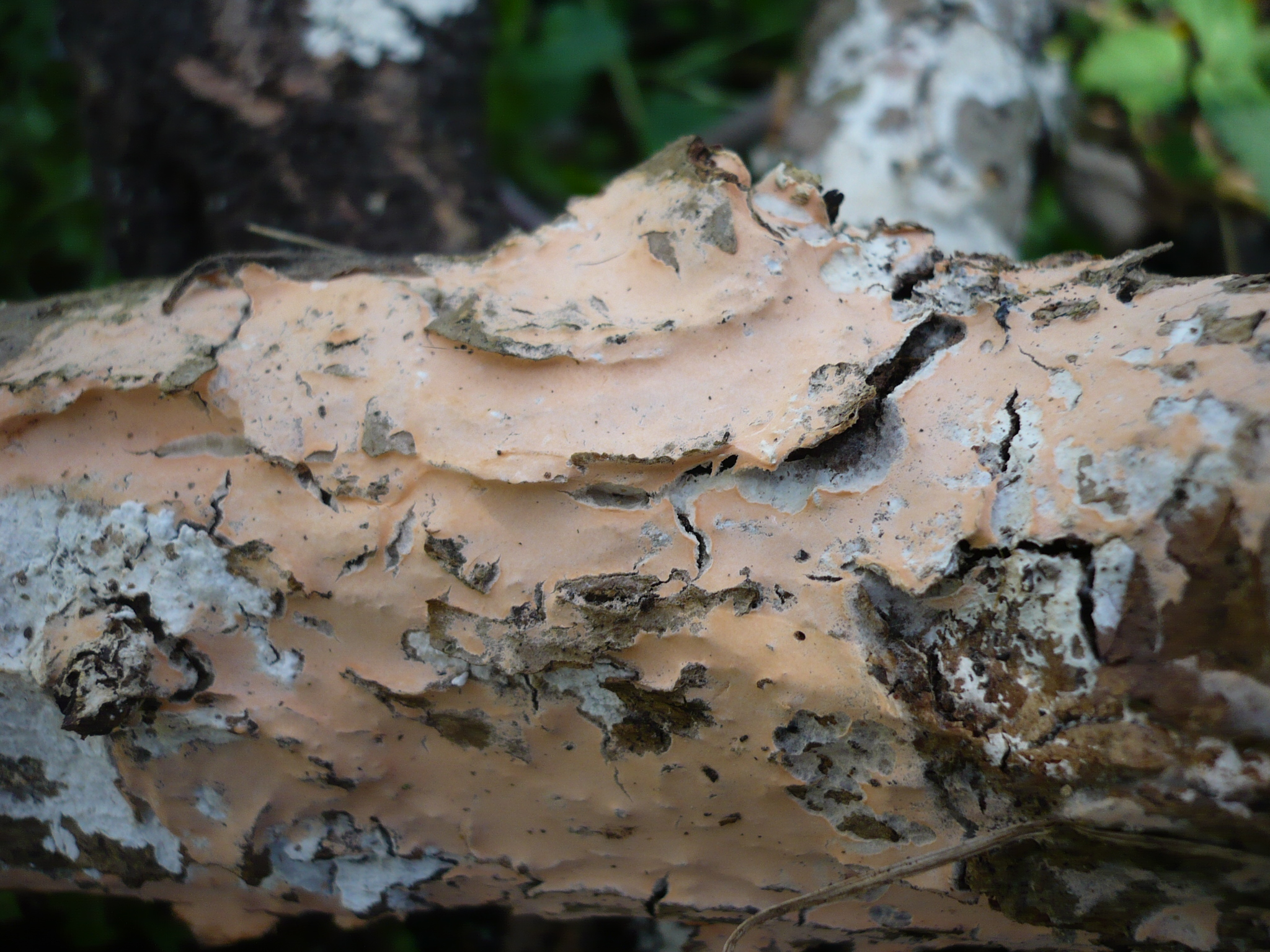
- Erythricium laetum

Scientific classification
- Kingdom: Fungi
- Division: Basidiomycota
- Class: Agaricomycetes
- Order: Corticiales
- Family: Corticiaceae; Herter (1910)

Type genus
- Corticium Pers.

Genera
- Basidiodesertica; Corticium; Disporotrichum; Erythricium; Giulia; Laetisaria; Marchandiomyces; Mycobernardia; Tretopileus; Waitea

= Corticiaceae =

Family of fungi

The Corticiaceae are a family of fungi in the order Corticiales. The family formerly included almost all the corticioid (patch- or crust-forming) fungi, whether they were related or not, and as such was highly artificial. In its current sense, however, the name Corticiaceae is restricted to a comparatively small group of corticioid genera within the Corticiales.

== Taxonomy ==
=== History ===
The German mycologist Wilhelm Gustav Franz Herter first published the Corticiaceae in 1910 to accommodate species of hymenomycetes that produced basidiocarps (fruit bodies) which were effused (spread out and patch-like) and had a more or less smooth hymenophore (spore-bearing surface). Since this definition was vague, superficial, and covered a large range of unrelated fungi, the Corticiaceae, though widely adopted, were also widely recognized as an unnatural grouping. Indeed, in a 1964 survey of families, Donk considered the Corticiaceae to be "a nice example of how extremely artificial taxa can be".

In this wide sense, the boundaries of the Corticiaceae were never clearly defined. It was sometimes separated from the Stereaceae, a family in which fruitbodies had a tendency to form pilei (caps or brackets), but often these two artificial families were united. In this united sense, the Corticiaceae certainly included the genera and species treated in the standard, 8-volume reference work The Corticiaceae of North Europe (1972-1987), where it was acknowledged that the family was "not a natural taxon but an assemblage of species with similar habitat." With the addition of non-European species, this meant that the Corticiaceae eventually expanded to include over 200 genera worldwide. The name "Corticiaceae" is still occasionally used in this wide sense (sensu lato), but it has generally been replaced by the term "corticioid fungi".

=== Current status ===
Molecular research, based on cladistic analysis of DNA sequences, has limited the Corticiaceae in its strict sense (sensu stricto) to a comparatively small group of ten genera within the Corticiales.

== Description ==
Though now based on molecular phylogenetics, the Corticiaceae s.s. have certain features partly in common. Basidiocarps, for example, are effused (corticioid) and have a tendency to be pink or orange, as in the type species of Corticium, (C. roseum), and species in genera such as Erythricium, Marchandiomyces, and Laetisaria. Several of the Corticiaceae also produce sclerotia, bulbils, or other anamorphic (asexual) propagules, including species in the genera Corticium, Laetisaria, Marchandiomyces, and Waitea. Finally, many of the Corticiaceae s.s. are obligate or facultative pathogens, such as Erythricium aurantiacum and Marchandiomyces corallinus on lichens and Erythricium salmonicolor, Laetisaria spp, and some Waitea spp on grasses and other plants.

== Habitat and distribution ==
Several species in the Corticiaceae are wood-rotting saprotrophs, typically forming corticioid basidiocarps on the undersides of dead, attached branches, less commonly on fallen wood. Several are parasites of lichens, grasses, or other plants. Giulia tenuis produces a pycnidial anamorph growing on bamboo. Collectively, they have a cosmopolitan distribution.

== Economic importance ==
A number of species within the Corticiaceae are commercially important pathogens of crops or turf grass. Erythricium salmonicolor attacks woody commercial crops (citrus, coffee, rubber, etc.) in the tropics, causing "pink disease". Waitea oryzae and Waitea zeae cause diseases of cereal crops, including "sheath spot" of rice. Waitea circinata causes "brown ring patch" in turf grasses. Laetisaria fuciformis is the cause of "red thread" disease in turf grass.
