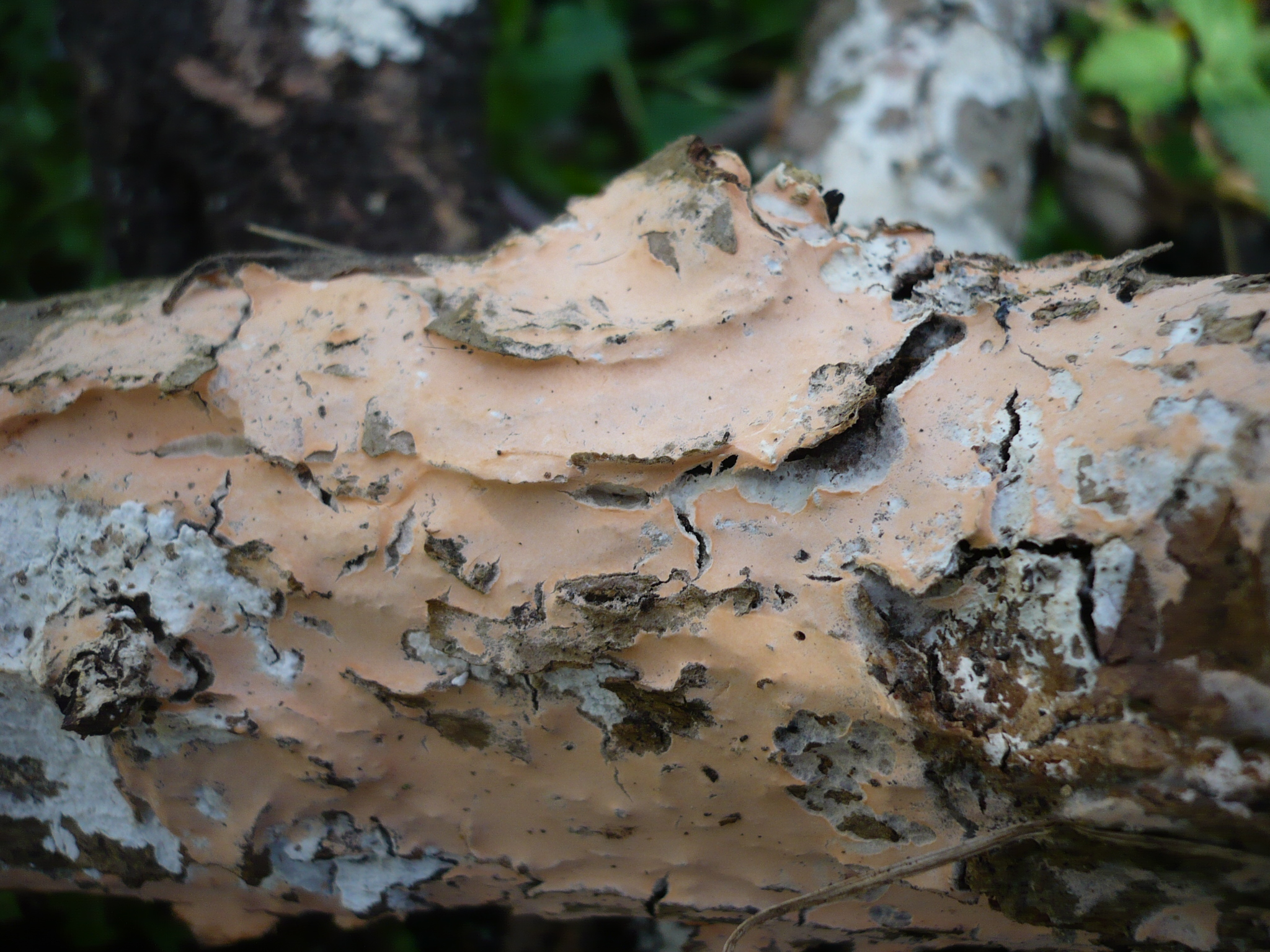
- Erythricium laetum

Scientific classification
- Kingdom: Fungi
- Division: Basidiomycota
- Class: Agaricomycetes
- Order: Corticiales; K.-H. Larsson (2007)

Families
- Corticiaceae; Dendrominiaceae; Punctulariaceae; Vuilleminiaceae

Synonyms
- 1907 Protohymeniales Lotsy; 1998 Vuilleminiales Boidin, Mugnier & Canales

= Corticiales =

Order of fungi

The Corticiales are an order of fungi in the class Agaricomycetes. The order is composed of corticioid fungi. Species within the order are generally saprotrophic, most of them wood-rotters, but several are parasitic on grasses or lichens. Plant pathogens of economic importance include Erythricium salmonicolor, Laetisaria fuciformis, Waitea circinata, Waitea oryzae, and Waitea zeae.

== Taxonomy ==
The order was established in 2007 by Swedish mycologist Karl-Henrik Larsson, based on molecular phylogenetic research. It includes the Corticiaceae (the type family) as well as the Dendrominiaceae, Punctulariaceae, and Vuilleminiaceae.

== Habitat and distribution ==
The order is cosmopolitan and contains around 150 species of fungi worldwide. The majority of species in the Corticiales are saprotrophs, most of them wood-rotters, typically found on dead attached branches. Some species of Laetisaria are facultative or obligate parasites of grasses; some species of Erythricium and Waitea are also facultative plant parasites; and some species of Erythricium. Some species of Laetisaria, and Marchandiomyces are parasites of lichens.

== Economic importance ==
Erythricium salmonicolor is an important plant pathogen causing "pink disease" of Citrus and other trees. Waitea oryzae and Waitea zeae are pathogens of commercial cereal crops, causing a number of diseases including sheath spot of rice. Waitea circinata causes brown ring patch in turf grasses. Laetisaria fuciformis is the cause of red thread disease in turf grass.
