= Corticioid fungi =

Group of fungi

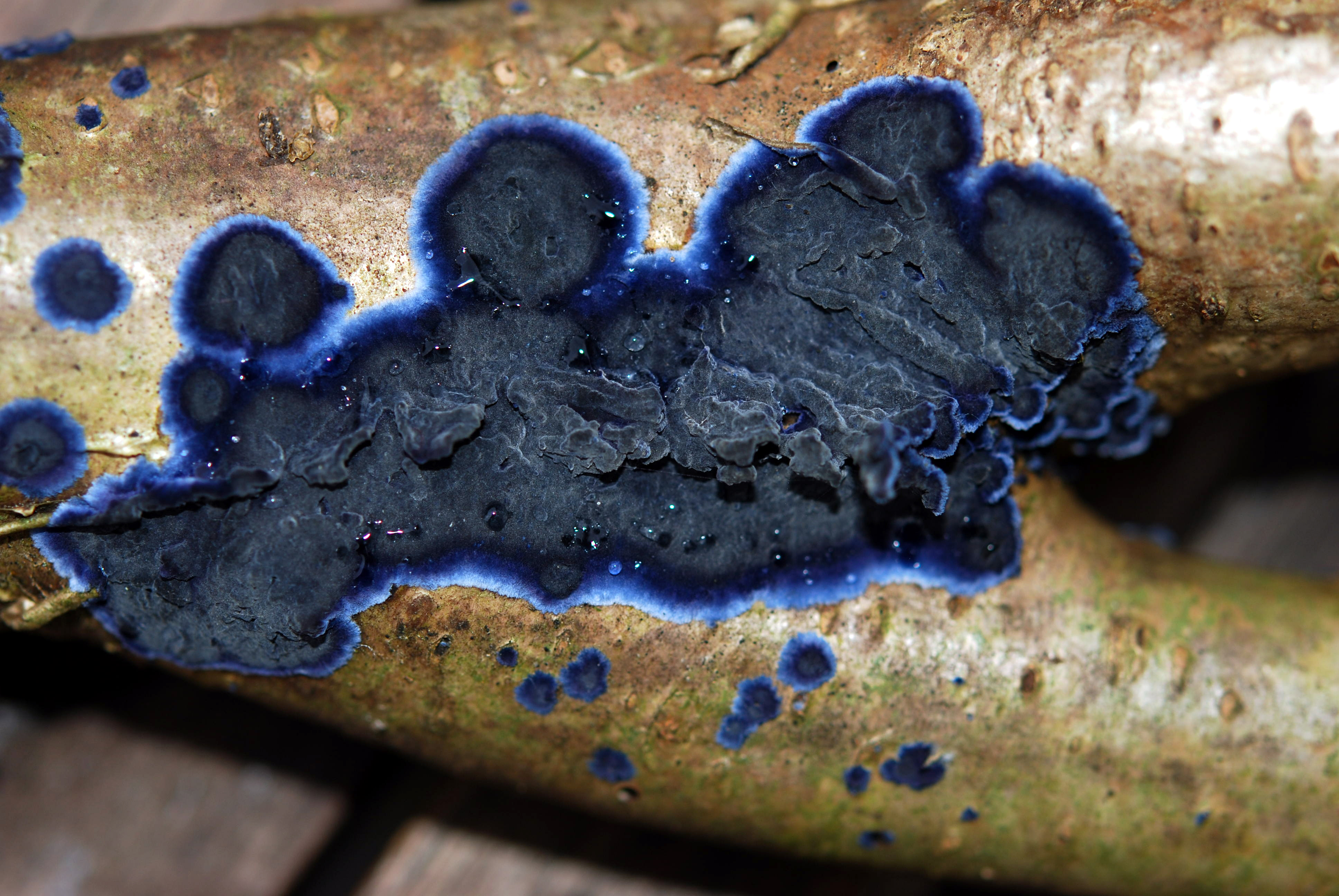
The corticioid fungus Terana caerulea, growing on the undersurface of dead branches

The corticioid fungi are a group of fungi in the Basidiomycota typically having effused, smooth basidiocarps (fruit bodies) that are formed on the undersides of dead tree trunks or branches. They are sometimes colloquially called crust fungi or patch fungi. Originally such fungi were referred to the genus Corticium ("corticioid" means Corticium-like) and subsequently to the family Corticiaceae, but it is now known that all corticioid species are not necessarily closely related. The fact that they look similar is an example of convergent evolution. Since they are often studied as a group, it is convenient to retain the informal (non-taxonomic) name of "corticioid fungi" and this term is frequently used in research papers and other texts.

== History ==
The genus Corticium was established by Persoon in 1794 for fungi having smooth, effused fruit bodies. Corticium roseum Pers. was later selected as the type species. Subsequent authors described over 1000 species in the genus which continued to be used in its wide sense up until the 1950s. Though a number of genera had been recognized as distinct from Corticium from the late nineteenth century onwards, it was not until Swedish mycologist Prof. John Eriksson reviewed the corticioid fungi in a series of publications starting in 1950 that modern concepts were formed. The eight-volume work that he initiated, Corticiaceae of North Europe (1973-1987), effectively established the current circumscription of the corticioid fungi.

Eriksson and his co-authors, however, still placed all or most of these fungi within the Corticiaceae, though stating that this was "not a natural taxon but an assemblage of species with similar habitat." It was not until the advent of DNA sequencing that the full diversity of these fungi was realized. The genus Corticium is still retained, but is now restricted to a few species closely related to the type. The Corticiaceae is now equally restricted to a few genera close to (and including) Corticium. Crust-like species are found in no less than 18 of the 24 currently recognized orders of higher basidiomycetes (Agaricomycotina).

== Description and diversity ==
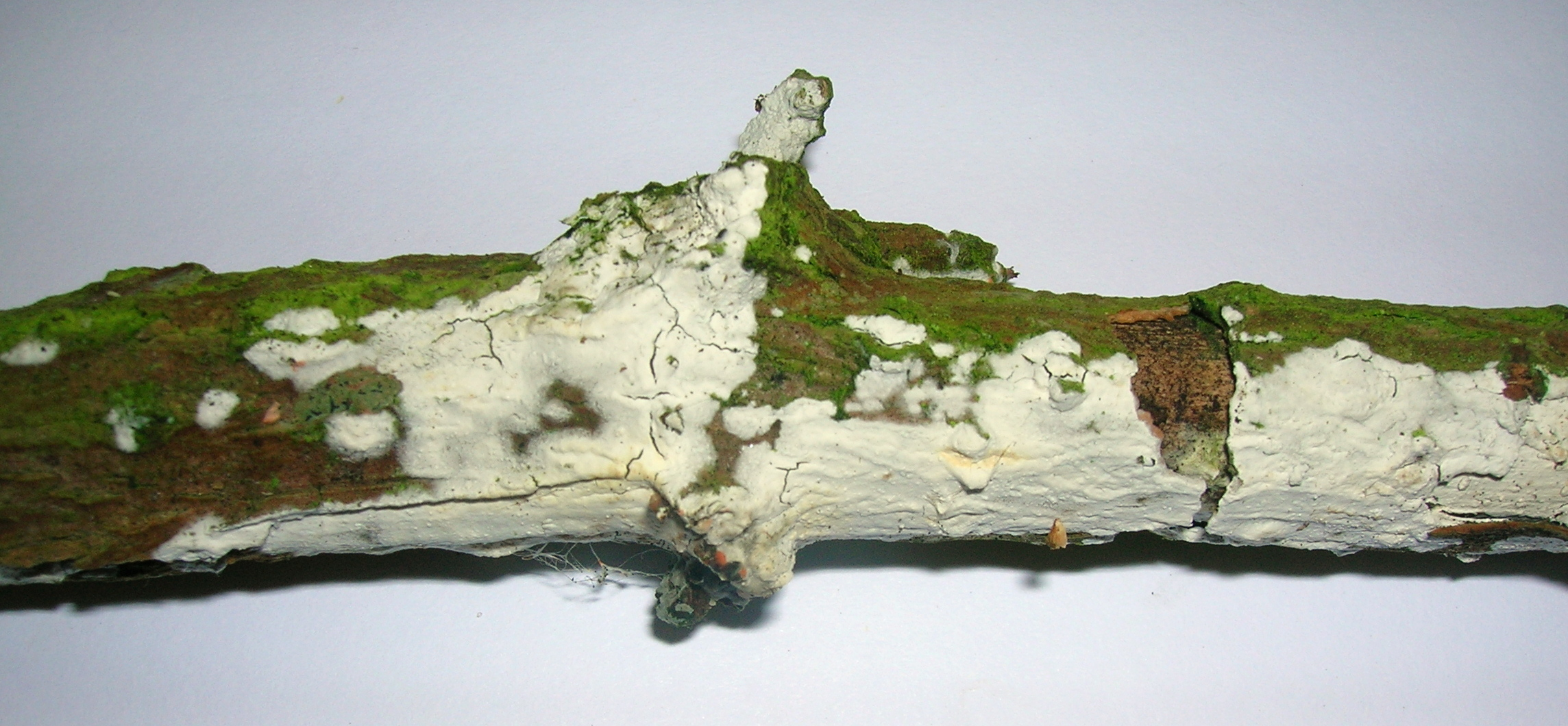
The corticioid fungus Lyomyces sambuci, common on dead elder branches

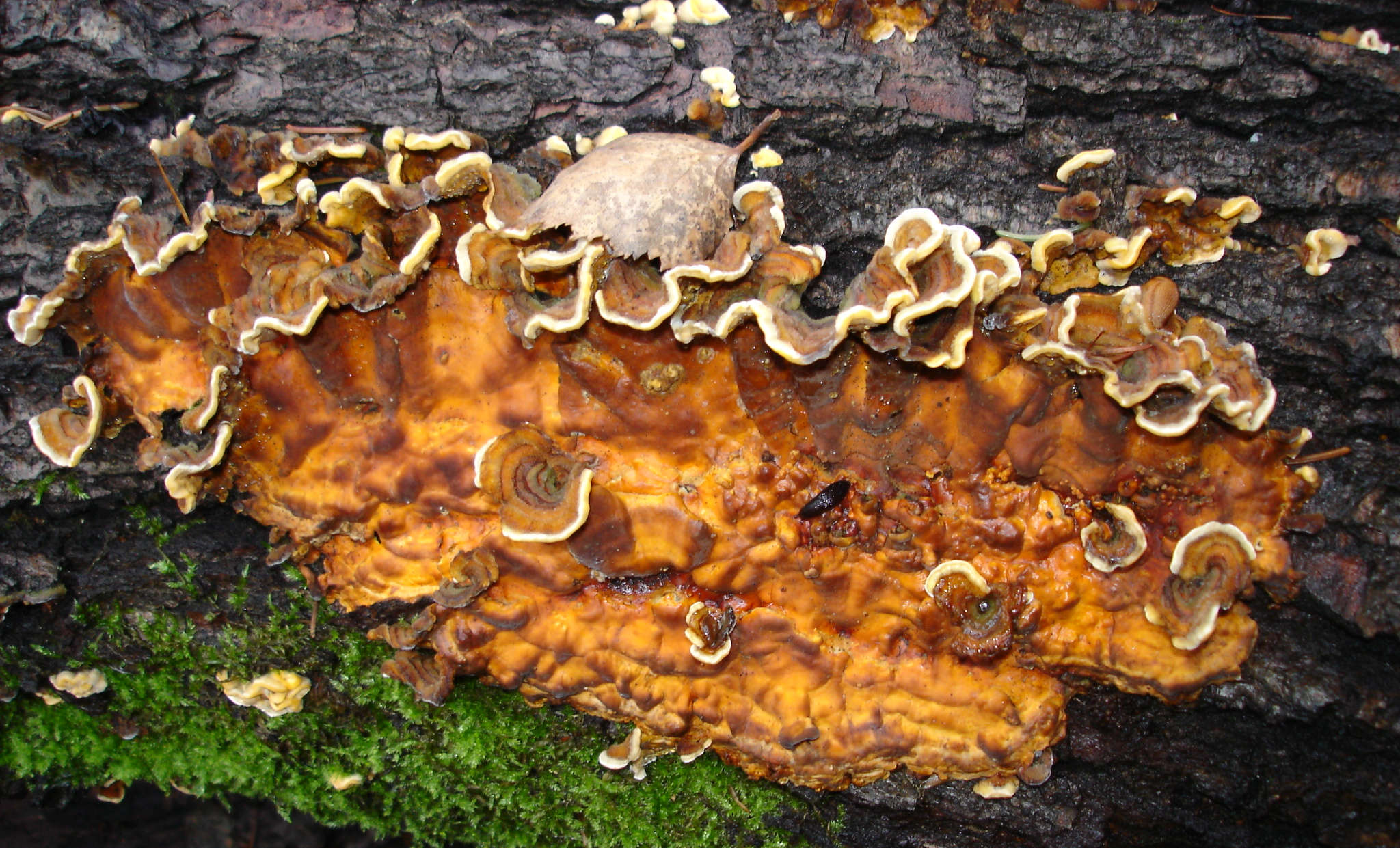
The corticioid fungus Stereum hirsutum, showing an effused fruit body with bracket-like outgrowths

Corticioid fungi are rather loosely defined, but most have effused fruit bodies, the spore bearing surface typically being smooth to granular or spiny. Some species (in the genera Stereum and Steccherinum, for example) may form fruit bodies that are partly bracket- or shelf-like with a smooth to spiny undersurface.

The corticioid fungi currently comprise around 1700 species worldwide, distributed amongst some 250 genera. They constitute around 13% of the homobasidiomycetes known to date.

== Habitat and distribution ==
Most corticioid fungi are wood-rotting species and rely on wood degradation as their primary means of nutrition. Although the fruiting bodies are formed on the underside of dead branches or logs, the fungus resides within the wood. A number of species are litter-rotting and produce fruitbodies underneath fallen leaves and compacted litter as well as on fallen wood. Some of these species are known to be ectomycorrhizal (forming a beneficial association with the roots of living trees). A few specialist species grow on dead herbaceous stems and leaves or on dead grass, rush, and sedge stems, especially in marshes. Parasites of plants and other fungi are also found in the group.

Corticioid fungi have a worldwide distribution, but are commonest in forest communities.
