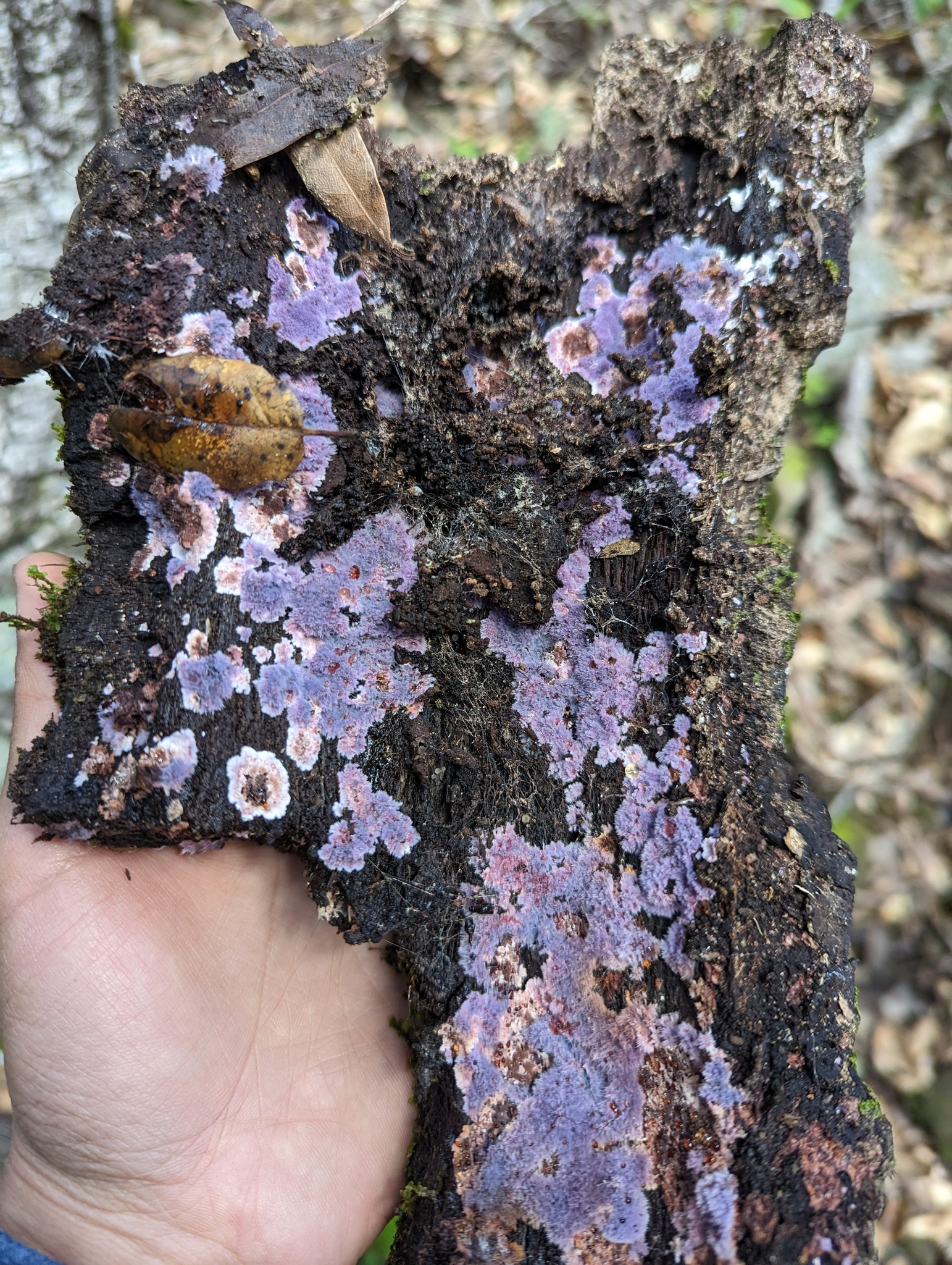
- San Luis Obispo County, 2023

Scientific classification
- Kingdom: Fungi
- Division: Basidiomycota
- Class: Agaricomycetes
- Order: Corticiales
- Family: Punctulariaceae
- Genus: Punctularia
- Species: P. atropurpurascens

Binomial name
- Punctularia atropurpurascens (Berk. & Broome) Petch (1916)

Synonyms
- Corticium tuberculosum Punctularia subhepatica Punctularia tuberculosa Thelephora atropurpurascens Thelephora subhepatica

= Punctularia atropurpurascens =

Fungus species

Punctularia atropurpurascens, also known as violet crust or purple fuzz, is a species of fungus. Purple fuzz is a saprotrophic crust fungus. The preferred nutrient source of purple fuzz is the wood of deciduous trees. Purple fuzz is prone to guttation and weeps red. Purple fuzz appears to be a fairly widespread fungus capable of adapting to a variety of climates.

== See also ==
- Corticioid fungi
