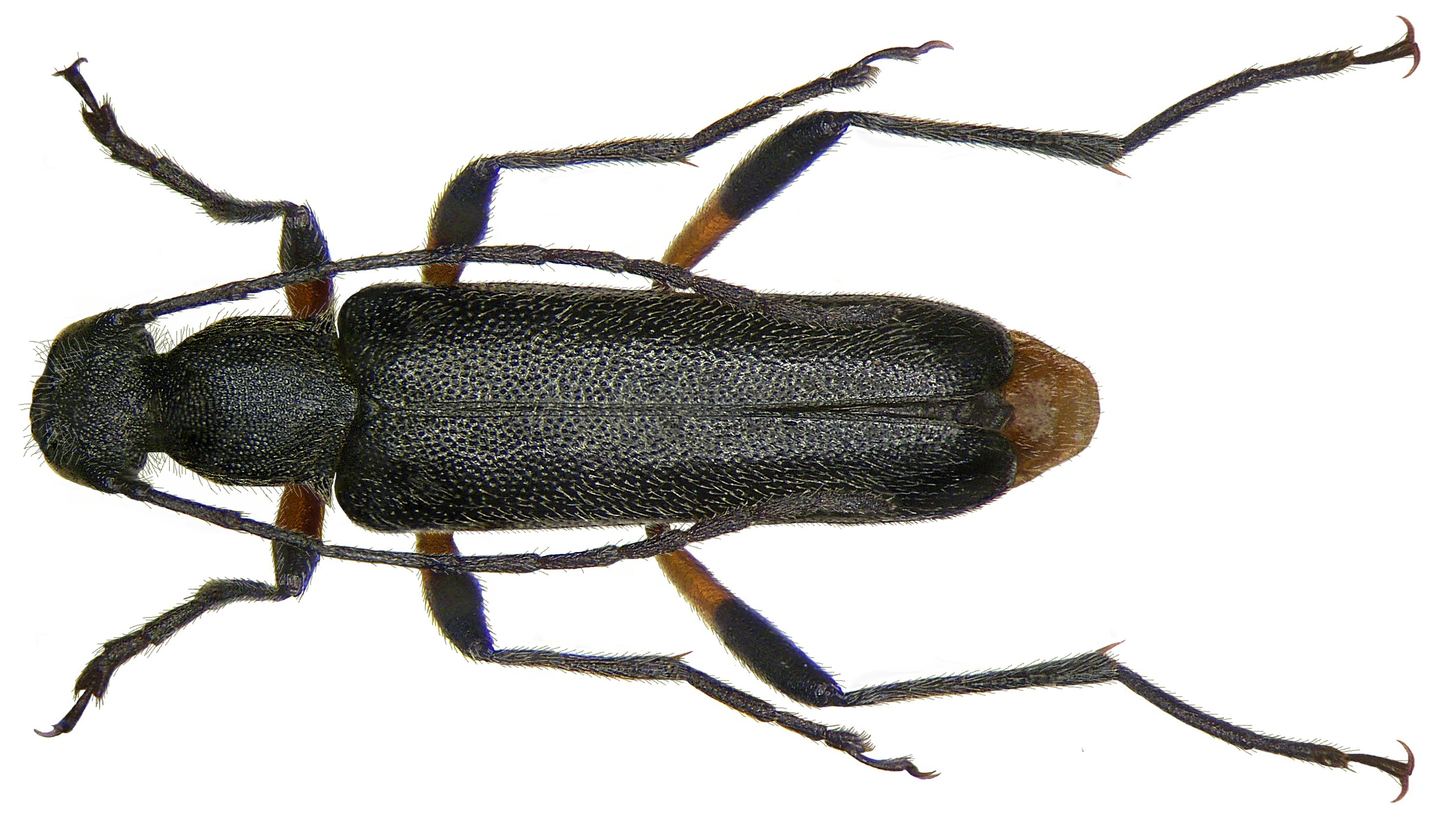
- Grammoptera abdominalis length 6-9 mm.

Scientific classification
- Kingdom: Animalia
- Phylum: Arthropoda
- Class: Insecta
- Order: Coleoptera
- Suborder: Polyphaga
- Infraorder: Cucujiformia
- Family: Cerambycidae
- Genus: Grammoptera
- Species: G. abdominalis

Binomial name
- Grammoptera abdominalis (Stephens, 1831)

= Grammoptera abdominalis =

Species of beetle

Grammoptera abdominalis is a species of beetle in family Cerambycidae. It is found in the Palearctic The species is widespread in Europe eastward to the Caucasus. In the Nordic region, the species is very rare. The larvae develop in dead branches of oak that have been attacked by fungi, especially the species Vuilleminia comedens, but it is possible that it is not specifically related to this species. Larvae development probably takes two years. The adults can be found in May–June, preferably on flowers.
