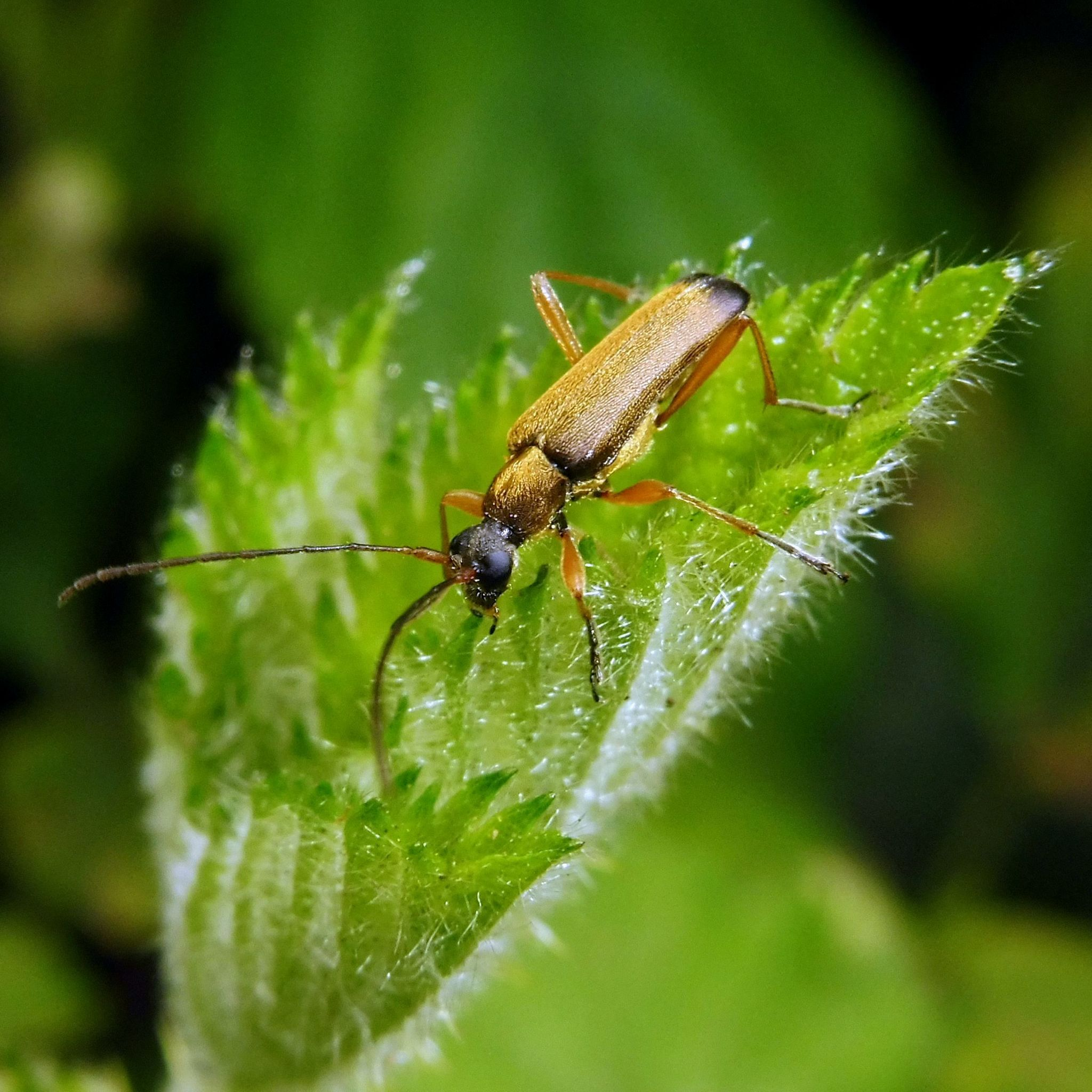

Scientific classification
- Kingdom: Animalia
- Phylum: Arthropoda
- Class: Insecta
- Order: Coleoptera
- Suborder: Polyphaga
- Infraorder: Cucujiformia
- Family: Cerambycidae
- Genus: Grammoptera
- Species: G. ustulat

Binomial name
- Grammoptera ustulat (Schaller, 1783)

= Grammoptera ustulata =

Species of beetle

Grammoptera ustulata is a species of beetle in family Cerambycidae. It is found in the Palearctic (Europe, Caucasus, Transcaucasia, Turkey )

It is a small longicorn 5 – 9 mm.long. Adults are found feeding at Crataegus and other flowers in Spring and Summer. The larvae develop in fungi infested (especially Vuilleminia comedens branches of deciduous trees .
