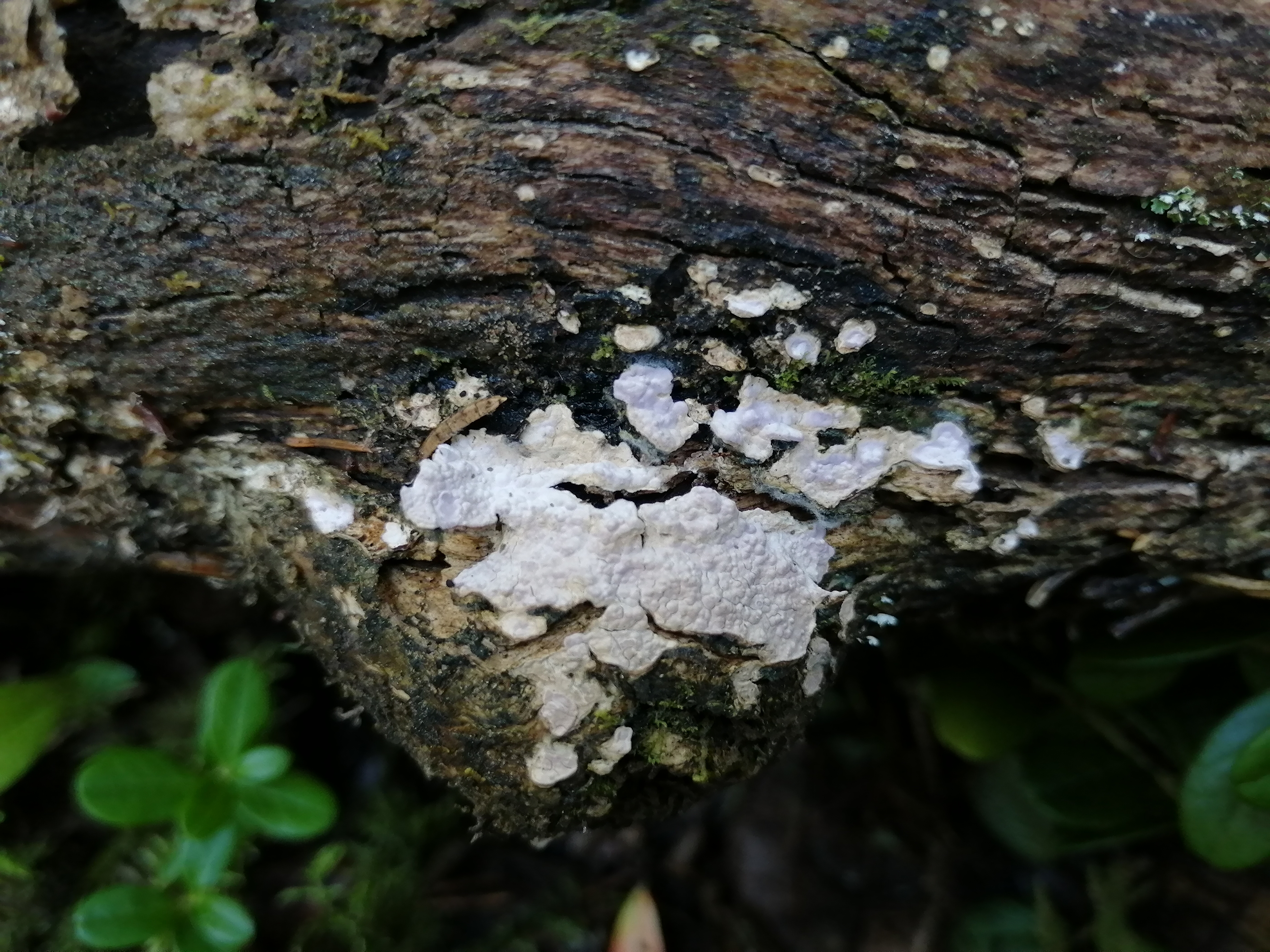

Scientific classification
- Domain: Eukaryota
- Kingdom: Fungi
- Division: Basidiomycota
- Class: Agaricomycetes
- Order: Corticiales
- Family: Punctulariaceae
- Genus: Dendrocorticium
- Species: D. polygonioides

Binomial name
- Dendrocorticium polygonioides (P. Karst.) M.J. Larsen & Gilb.

= Dendrocorticium polygonioides =

Species of fungus

Dendrocorticium polygonioides is a species of corticoid fungus in the family Punctulariaceae, first described by Petter Adolf Karsten and given the current name by Michael J. Larsen & Robert Lee Gilbertson

== Distribution and habitat ==
It appears mostly in Europe. It grows in forests, on dead branches of Corylus and Salix.
