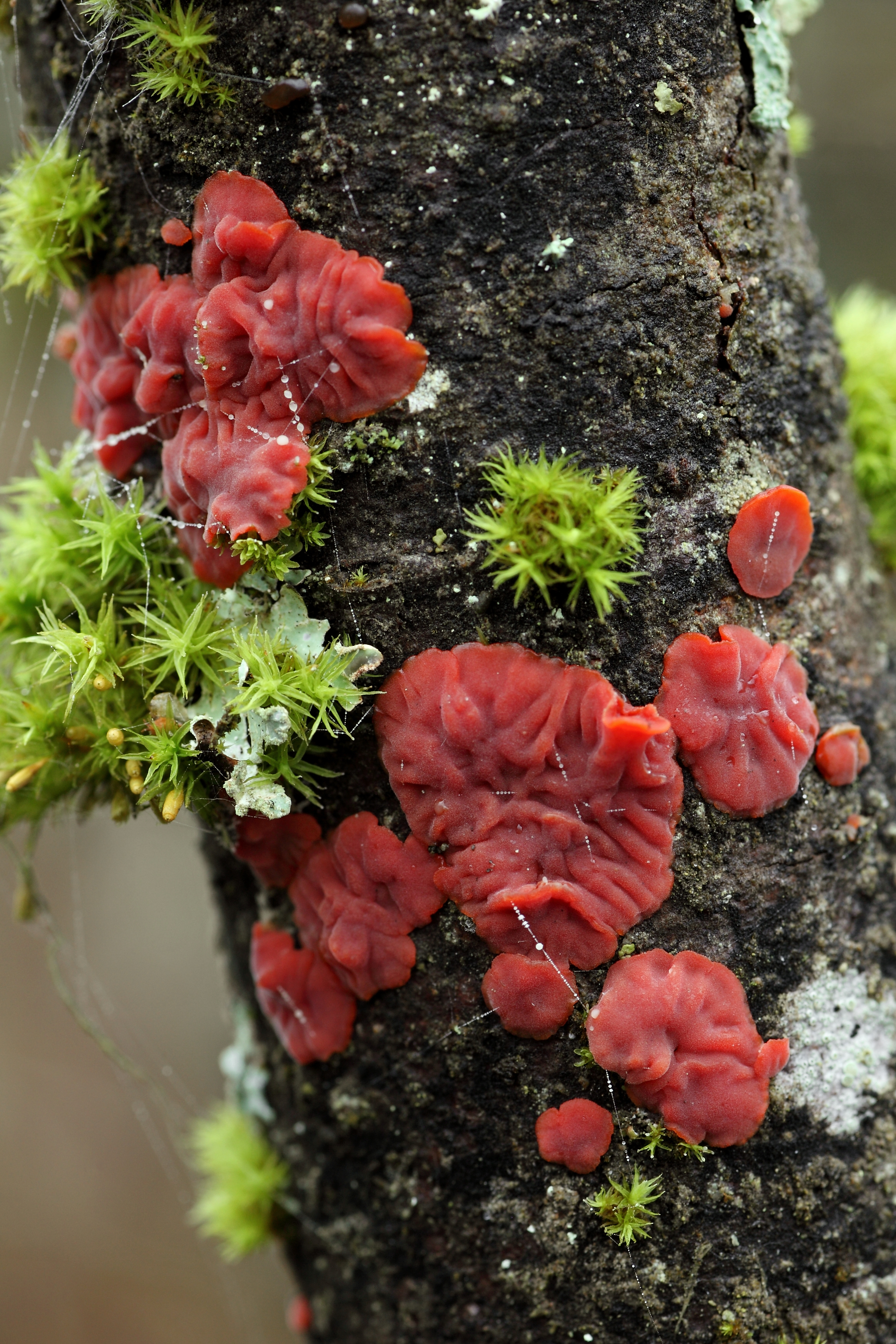

Scientific classification
- Kingdom: Fungi
- Division: Basidiomycota
- Class: Agaricomycetes
- Order: Corticiales
- Family: Vuilleminiaceae
- Genus: Cytidia
- Species: C. salicina

Binomial name
- Cytidia salicina (Fr.) Burt 1924

Synonyms
- Stereum salicinum (Fr.) E.H.L. Krause 1931; Terana salicina (Fr.) Kuntze 1891; Lomatia salicina (Fr.) P. Karst. 1889; Lomatina salicina (Fr.) P. Karst. 1889; Cytidia rutilans Pers. ex Quél. 1888; Auricularia salicina (Fr.) Quél. 1886; Corticium salicinum (Fr.) Fr. 1838; Thelephora salicina Fr. 1821

= Cytidia salicina =

Species of fungus

Cytidia salicina, commonly known as scarlet splash, is a species of fungus that is found growing on willows and other deciduous woody plants in Europe. The spores are 12-18x4-5 um.
