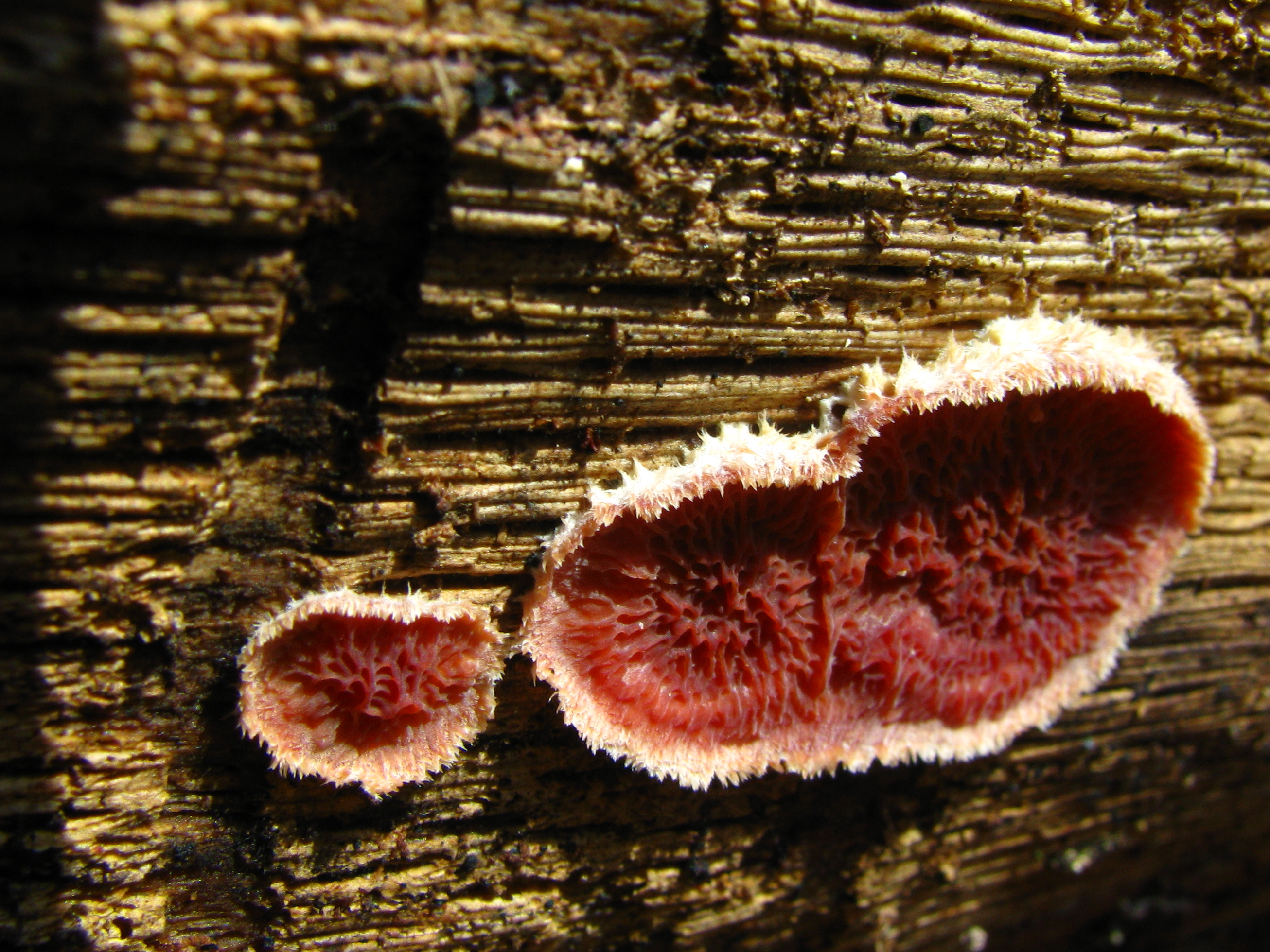
- In Strouds Run State Park, Ohio

Scientific classification
- Domain: Eukaryota
- Kingdom: Fungi
- Division: Basidiomycota
- Class: Agaricomycetes
- Order: Corticiales
- Family: Punctulariaceae
- Genus: Punctularia
- Species: P. strigosozonata

Binomial name
- Punctularia strigosozonata (Schwein.) P.H.B.Talbot (1958)

Synonyms
- Merulius strigosozonatus; Phlebia strigosozonata; Stereum strigosozonatum

= Punctularia strigosozonata =

Species of fungus

Punctularia strigosozonata is a fungus species of the genus Punctularia. It was originally described in 1832 by Lewis David de Schweinitz as a member of genus Merulius. Patrick Talbot transferred it to genus Punctularia in 1958. Punctularia strigosozonata produces the antibiotic phlebiarubrone.
