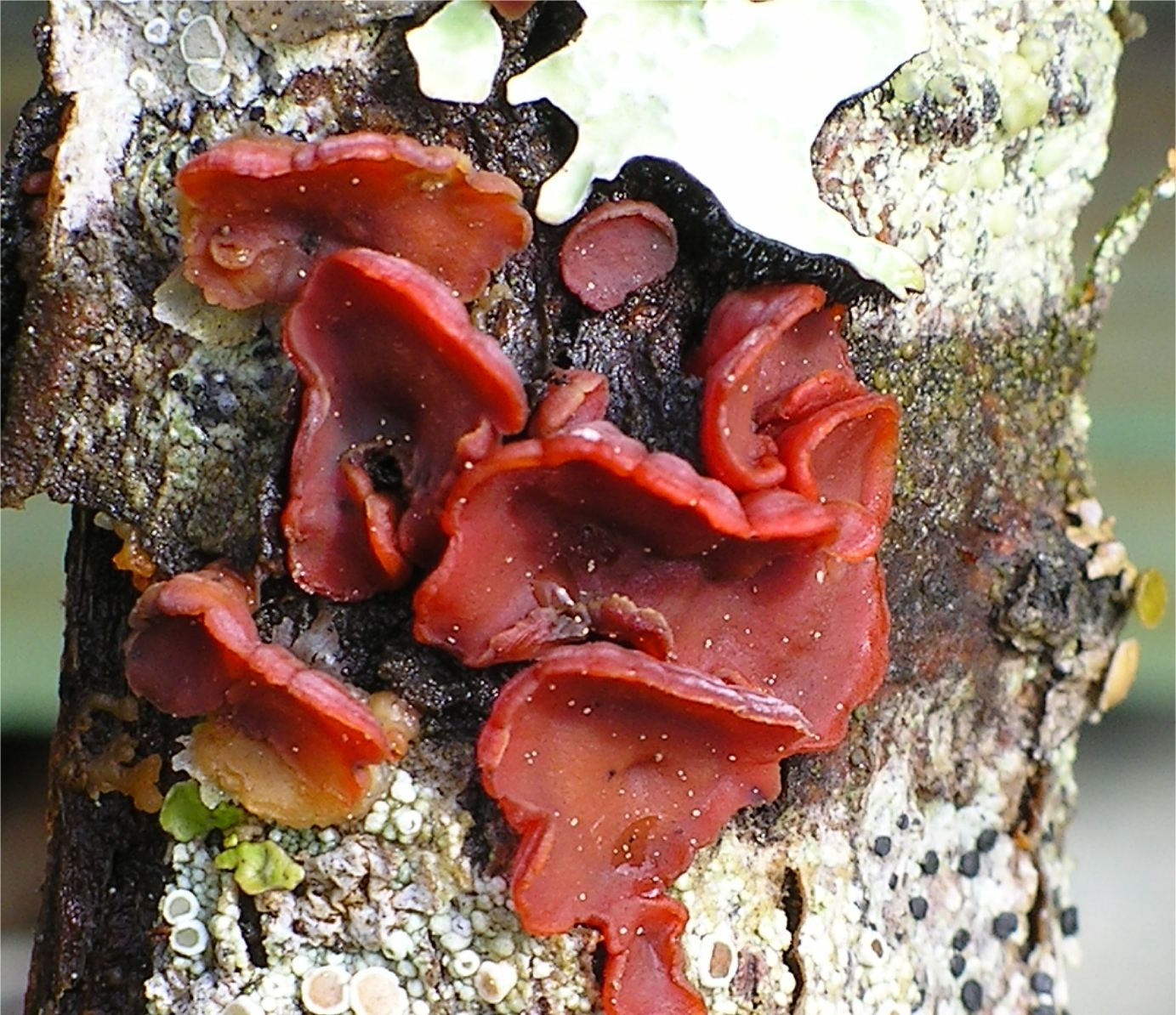
- Cytidia salicina

Scientific classification
- Kingdom: Fungi
- Division: Basidiomycota
- Class: Agaricomycetes
- Order: Corticiales
- Family: Vuilleminiaceae
- Genus: Cytidia; Quél. (1888)

Type species
- Cytidia rutilans Pers. ex Quél. (1888)

Species
- C. cristallifera C. patelliformis C. pezizoides C. salicina C. sarcoides C. stereoides

= Cytidia =

Genus of fungi

Cytidia is a genus of fungi in the family Vuilleminiaceae. The genus contains five widely distributed species. Cytidia was circumscribed by French mycologist Lucien Quélet in 1888.

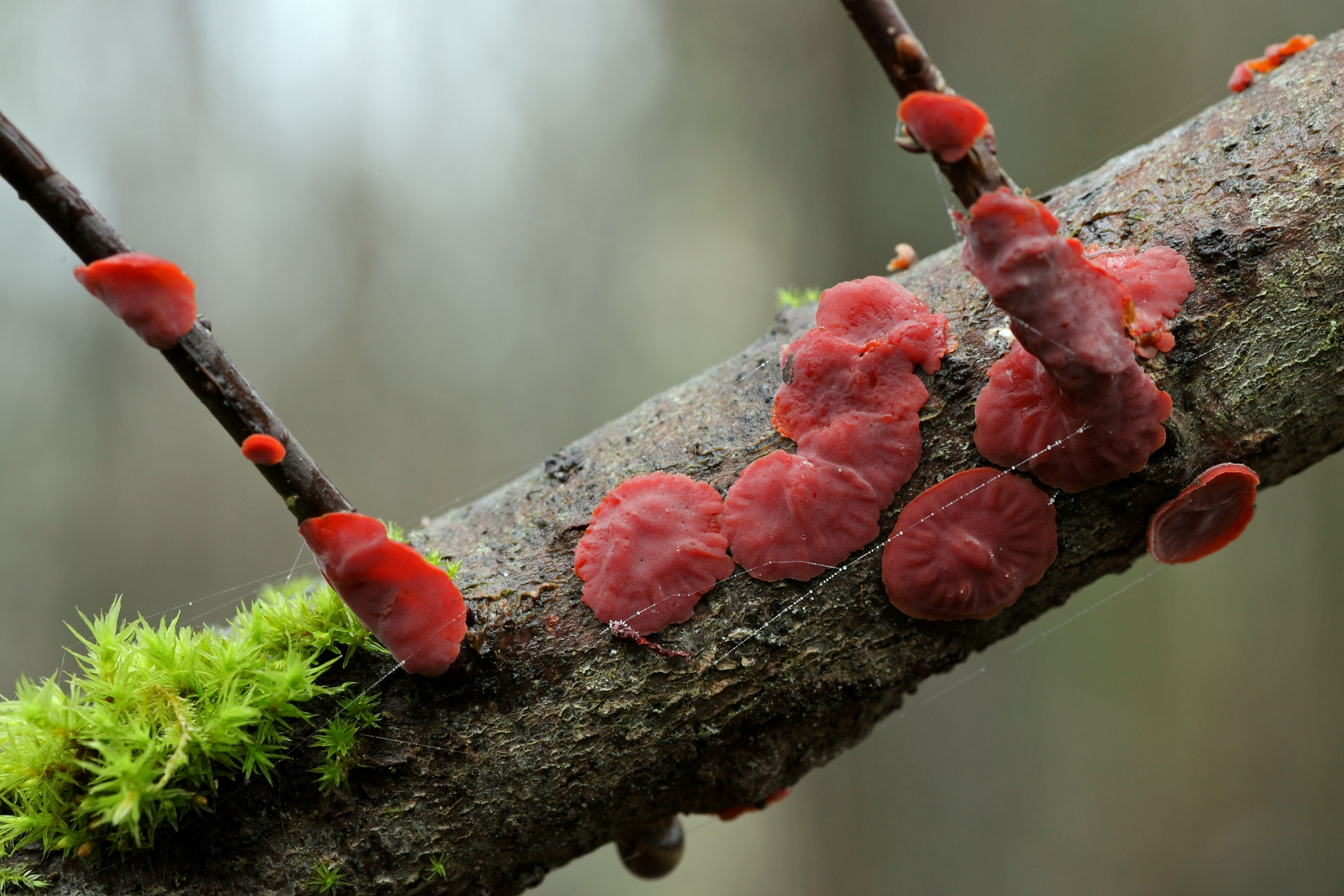
C. salicina, Estonia
