= Grammoptera militaris =

Scientific classification
- Kingdom: Animalia
- Phylum: Arthropoda
- Class: Insecta
- Order: Coleoptera
- Suborder: Polyphaga
- Infraorder: Cucujiformia
- Family: Cerambycidae
- Genus: Grammoptera
- Species: G. militaris

Binomial name
- Grammoptera militaris (Chevrolat, 1855)

Species of beetle

Grammoptera militaris is a species of beetle in the family Cerambycidae. It was described by Chevrolat in 1855.
