= Grammoptera exigua =

Scientific classification
- Kingdom: Animalia
- Phylum: Arthropoda
- Class: Insecta
- Order: Coleoptera
- Suborder: Polyphaga
- Infraorder: Cucujiformia
- Family: Cerambycidae
- Genus: Grammoptera
- Species: G. exigua

Binomial name
- Grammoptera exigua (Newman, 1841)

Species of beetle

Grammoptera exigua is a species of beetle in the family Cerambycidae. It was described by Newman in 1841.
