= Grammoptera rhodopus =

Scientific classification
- Kingdom: Animalia
- Phylum: Arthropoda
- Class: Insecta
- Order: Coleoptera
- Suborder: Polyphaga
- Infraorder: Cucujiformia
- Family: Cerambycidae
- Genus: Grammoptera
- Species: G. rhodopus

Binomial name
- Grammoptera rhodopus (LeConte, 1874)

Species of beetle

Grammoptera rhodopus is a species of beetle in the family Cerambycidae. It was described by John Lawrence LeConte in 1874.
