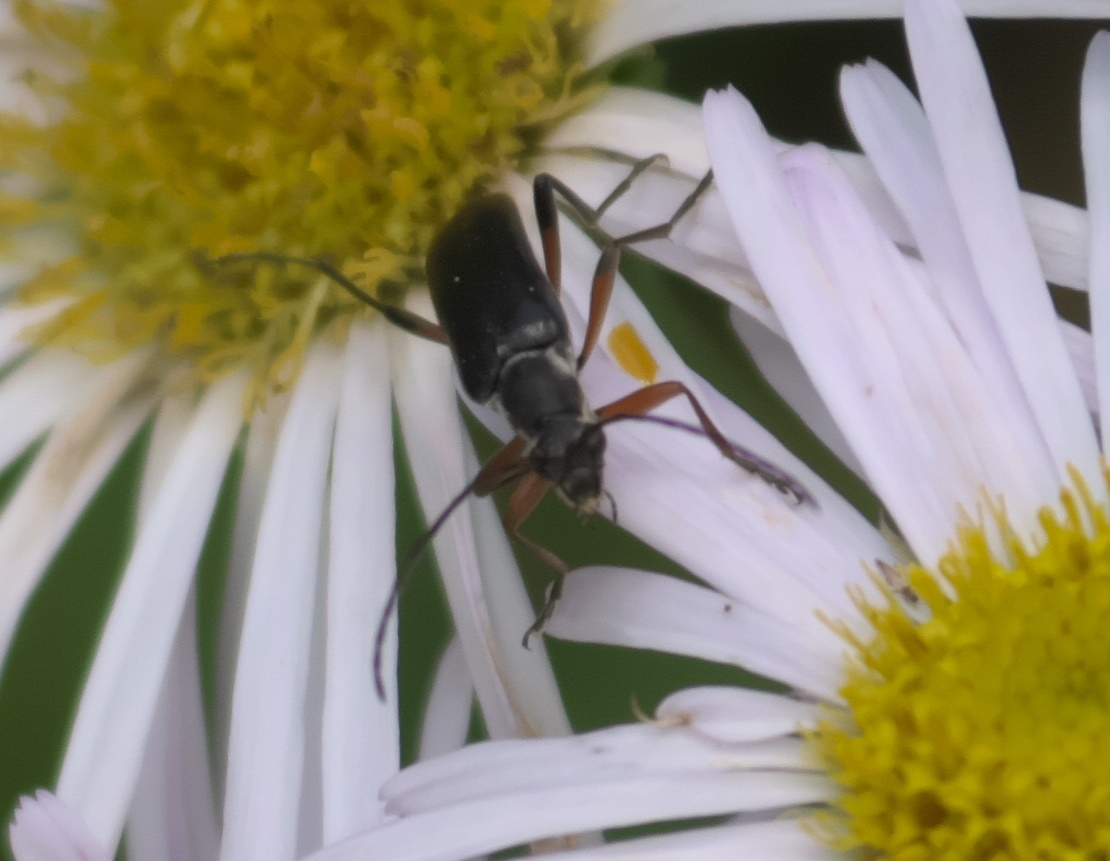
- Grammoptera subargentata

Scientific classification
- Kingdom: Animalia
- Phylum: Arthropoda
- Clade: Pancrustacea
- Class: Insecta
- Order: Coleoptera
- Suborder: Polyphaga
- Infraorder: Cucujiformia
- Family: Cerambycidae
- Genus: Grammoptera
- Species: G. subargentata

Binomial name
- Grammoptera subargentata (Kirby in Richardson, 1837)

= Grammoptera subargentata =

Species of beetle

Grammoptera subargentata is a species of beetle in the family Cerambycidae. It was described by William Kirby in 1837.
