= Phlebiarubrone =

Names
- IUPAC name 4,7-diphenyl-1,3-benzodioxole-5,6-dione

Identifiers
CAS Number	7204-23-1
3D model (JSmol)	Interactive image
ChemSpider	26538261
PubChem CID	12314165
CompTox Dashboard (EPA)	DTXSID20487435
- InChI: InChI=1S/C19H12O4/c20-16-14(12-7-3-1-4-8-12)18-19(23-11-22-18)15(17(16)21)13-9-5-2-6-10-13/h1-10H,11H2 Key: XYMMGDPUFCLMOA-UHFFFAOYSA-N
- SMILES: C1OC2=C(C(=O)C(=O)C(=C2O1)C3=CC=CC=C3)C4=CC=CC=C4

Properties
Chemical formula	C_{19}H_{12}O_{4}
Molar mass	304.301 g·mol^{−1}
- Except where otherwise noted, data are given for materials in their standard state (at 25 °C [77 °F], 100 kPa). Infobox references

Phlebiarubrone is an antibiotic with the molecular formula C_{19}H_{12}O_{4} which is produced by the fungi Punctularia strigosozonata.
