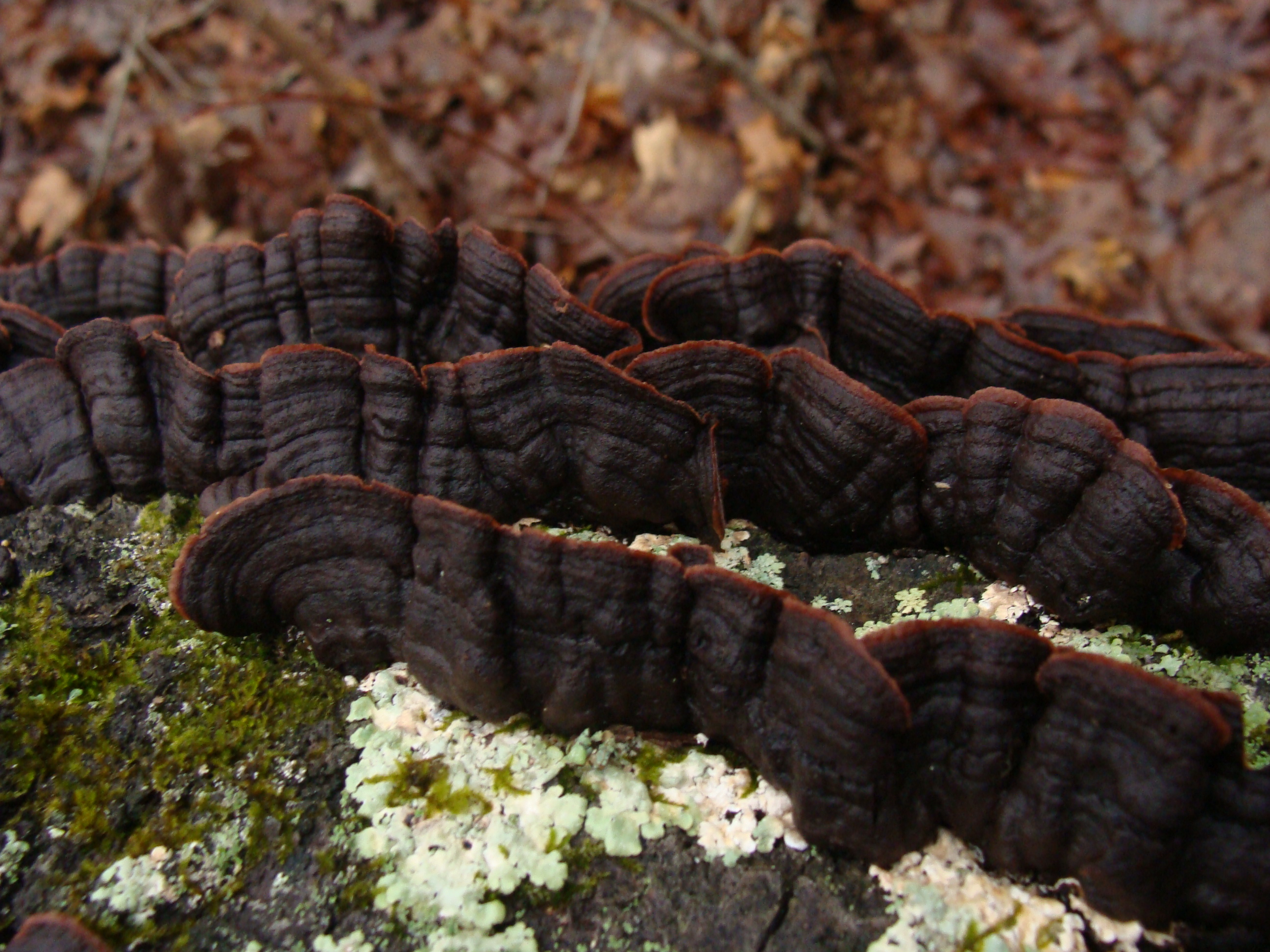
- Punctularia strigosozonata

Scientific classification
- Kingdom: Fungi
- Division: Basidiomycota
- Class: Agaricomycetes
- Order: Corticiales
- Family: Punctulariaceae
- Genus: Punctularia; Pat. (1895)

Type species
- Punctularia atropurpurascens (Berk. & Broome) Petch (1916)

Species
- P. atropurpurascens P. strigosozonata

= Punctularia =

Genus of fungi

Punctularia is a genus of fungi in the family Punctulariaceae. The genus contains two widely distributed species.
