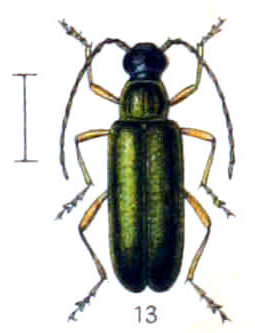
- Grammoptera ustulata

Scientific classification
- Kingdom: Animalia
- Phylum: Arthropoda
- Class: Insecta
- Order: Coleoptera
- Suborder: Polyphaga
- Infraorder: Cucujiformia
- Family: Cerambycidae
- Subfamily: Lepturinae
- Tribe: Lepturini
- Genus: Grammoptera; Audinet-Serville, 1835

Species
- 30 species

= Grammoptera =

Genus of beetles

Grammoptera is a genus of beetles in the family Cerambycidae, distributed primarily in the Northern Hemisphere.

== List of species ==
- Grammoptera abdominalis (Stephens, 1831)
- Grammoptera andrei Holzschuh, 1999
- Grammoptera angustata Pic, 1892
- Grammoptera auricollis Mulsant & Rey, 1863
- Grammoptera baudii Sama, 1992
- Grammoptera bipustulata Steiner, 1975
- Grammoptera brezinai (Holzschuh, 1998)
- Grammoptera cyanea Tamanuki, 1933
- Grammoptera coerulea Jureček, 1933
- Grammoptera debilipes (Holzschuh, 1991)
- Grammoptera elongata Pic, 1941
- Grammoptera exigua (Newman, 1841)
- Grammoptera fulgidipennis Holzschuh, 1991
- Grammoptera gracilis Brancsik, 1914
- Grammoptera grammopteroides (Pic, 1892)
- Grammoptera haematites (Newman, 1841)
- Grammoptera lenis (Holzschuh, 1999)
- Grammoptera matsudai Hayashi, 1974
- Grammoptera merkli Frivaldszky, 1884
- Grammoptera militaris (Chevrolat, 1855)
- Grammoptera molybdica (LeConte, 1850)
- Grammoptera nanella (Wickham, 1914)
- Grammoptera paucula (Holzschuh, 1999)
- Grammoptera querula Danilevsky, 1993
- Grammoptera rhodopus (LeConte, 1874)
- Grammoptera ruficornis (Fabricius, 1781)
- Grammoptera semimetallica Pic, 1939
- Grammoptera subargentata (Kirby in Richardson, 1837)
- Grammoptera ustulata (Schaller, 1783)
- Grammoptera viridipennis Pic, 1893
