= Dendrocorticium =

Scientific classification
- Kingdom: Fungi
- Division: Basidiomycota
- Class: Agaricomycetes
- Order: Corticiales
- Family: Punctulariaceae
- Genus: Dendrocorticium; M.J.Larsen & Gilb. (1974)

Type species
- Dendrocorticium polygonioides (P.Karst.) M.J.Larsen & Gilb. (1974)

Genus of fungi

Dendrocorticium is a genus of fungi in the family Punctulariaceae. According to the Dictionary of the Fungi (10th edition, 2008), the widespread genus contains seven species.

== Species ==
As of April 2018, Index Fungorum accepts 10 species of Dendrocorticium:

- Dendrocorticium ancistrophylli Boidin & Gilles (1998)
- Dendrocorticium crystalliferum Boidin & Gilles (1998)
- Dendrocorticium ionides (Bres.) M.J.Larsen & Gilb. (1974)
- Dendrocorticium nasti Boidin & Gilles (1998)
- Dendrocorticium ovalisporum Boidin & Gilles (1998)
- Dendrocorticium piceinum P.A.Lemke (1977)
- Dendrocorticium pinsapineum (G.Moreno, Manjón & Hjortstam) Gorjón & Bernicchia (2010)
- Dendrocorticium polygonioides (P.Karst.) M.J.Larsen & Gilb. (1974)
- Dendrocorticium roseolum (Bres. ex Rick) Baltazar & Rajchenb. (2013)
- Dendrocorticium violaceum H.S. Jacks. (1977)
