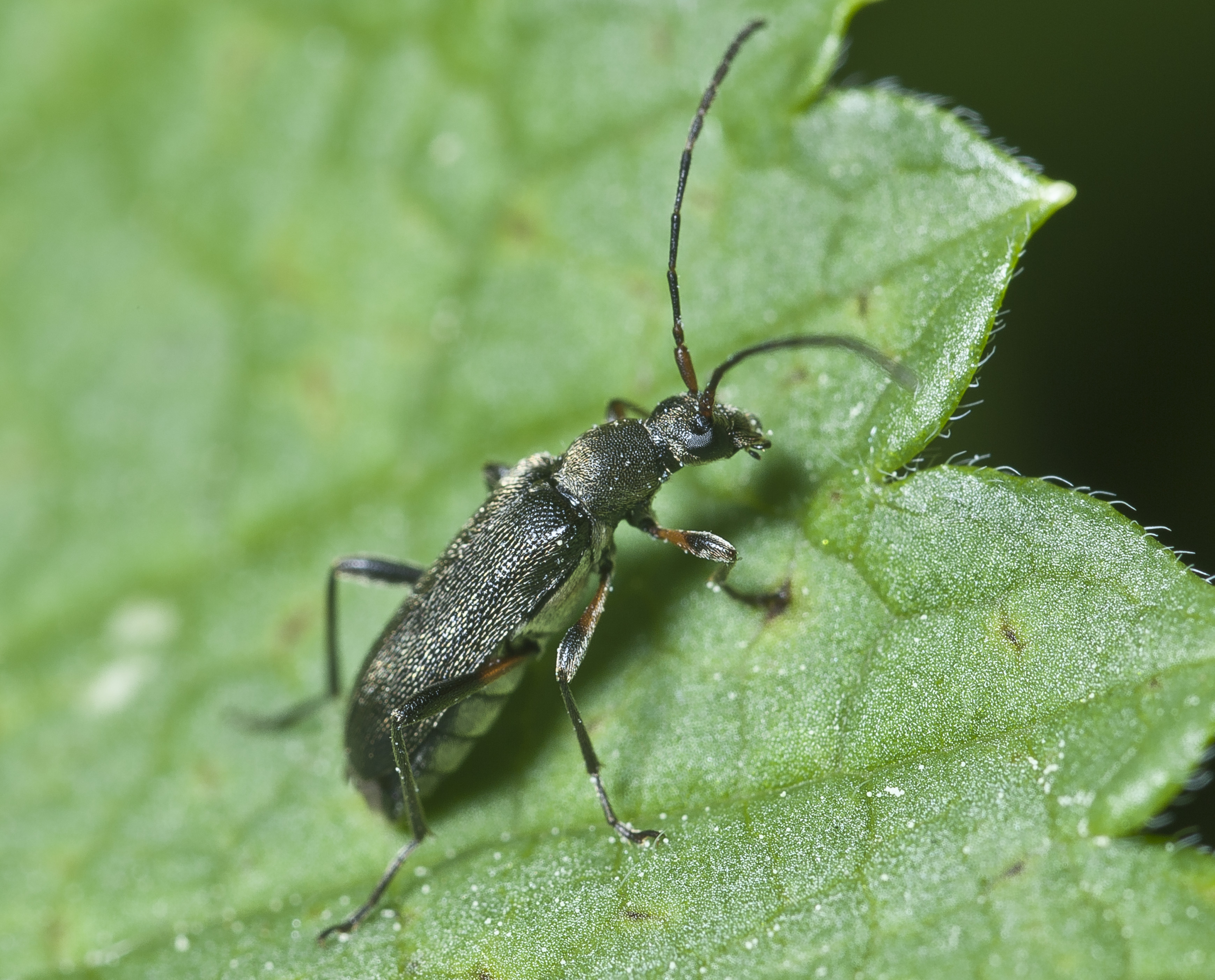
- Male
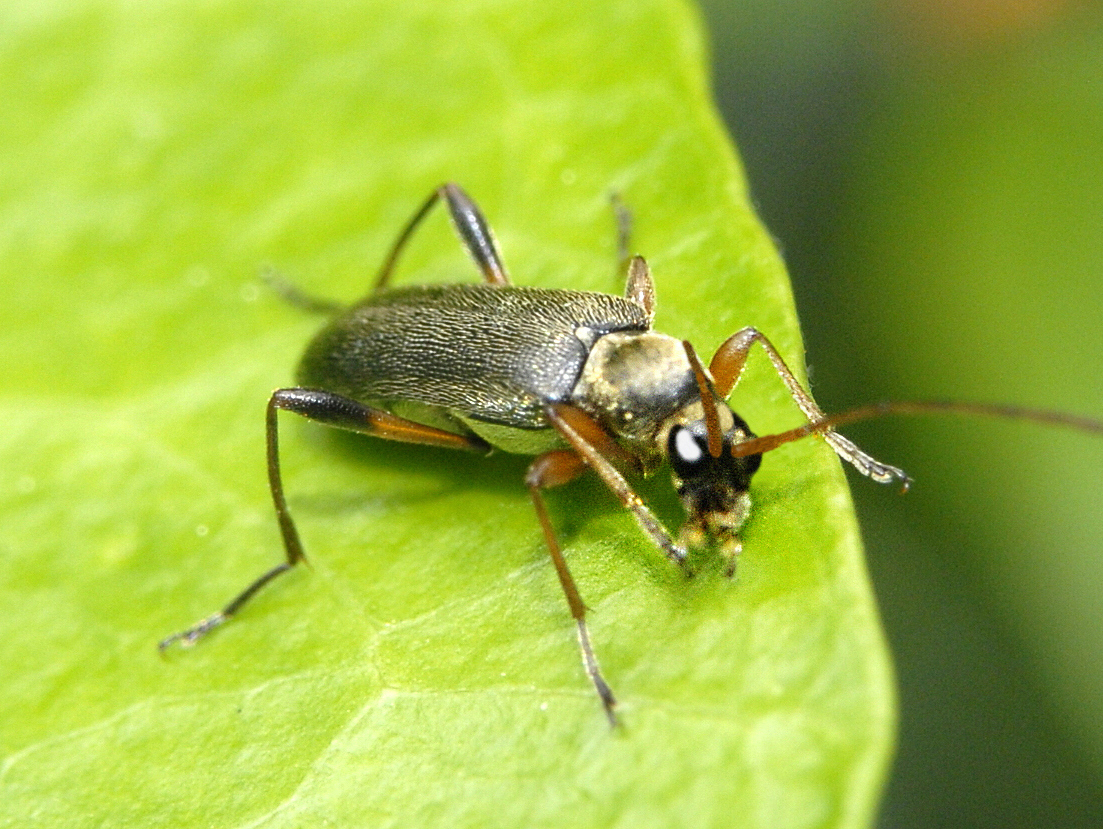
- Female

Scientific classification
- Kingdom: Animalia
- Phylum: Arthropoda
- Clade: Pancrustacea
- Class: Insecta
- Order: Coleoptera
- Suborder: Polyphaga
- Infraorder: Cucujiformia
- Family: Cerambycidae
- Genus: Grammoptera
- Species: G. ruficornis

Binomial name
- Grammoptera ruficornis (Fabricius, 1781)

Synonyms
- List: Leptura ruficornis Fabricius, 1781; Leptura atra Fabricius, 1775 nec Scopolii, 1772; Grammoptera atra (Fabricius) Vives, 2001; Leptura clavipes Geoffroy, 1785; Leptura femorata Olivier, 1795 nec Fabricius, 1787; Leptura laevis Herbst, 1784; Leptura parasina Thunberg, 1784; Leptura pumila Schaller, 1783; Leptura rufipes Goeze, 1777

= Grammoptera ruficornis =

Species of beetle

Grammoptera ruficornis is a species of beetle in family Cerambycidae.

== Etymology ==
The Latin scientific name ruficornis of this species means "with red antennae".

== Subspecies ==
Subspecies include:

- Grammoptera ruficornis flavipes Pic, 1892
- Grammoptera ruficornis ruficornis (Fabricius, 1781)

== Distribution ==
This species can be found in the Palearctic realm. It is present in most of Europe (Albania, Austria, Belarus, Belgium, Bosnia and Herzegovina, Bulgaria, Croatia, Czech Republic, Denmark, Estonia, France, Germany, Greece, Hungary, Ireland, Italy, Latvia, Lithuania, Luxembourg, Moldova, Montenegro, Netherlands, Norway, Poland, Portugal, Romania, Russia, Serbia, Slovakia, Slovenia, Spain, Sweden, Switzerland, Ukraine and United Kingdom), in Caucasus, Transcaucasia, Turkey, Azerbaijan and Iran.

== Habitat ==
These longhorns are linked to deciduous forest and they occur in forests, glades, pastures and old deciduous trees. In the Alps they rarely exceed an elevation of 1,000 metres (3,300 ft) above sea level.

== Description ==
Grammoptera ruficornis can reach a body length of about 3–7 mm (0.12–0.28 in). Females are longer and wider than males. These small longicorns have a stretched and densely punctate body (pronotum and elytra), not very narrow at the back, with silky hairs on the elytra. Eyes are rather close to the jaw base. The color is dark brown or black, with long yellow-red antennae that are almost as long as the body and show an elongate 2nd segment. Also the legs are partly yellowish red, with bulbous bicoloured femora, but hind femora sometimes are entirely black.

== Biology ==
Adults are found feeding on Carolina buckthorn (Rhamnus cathartica), European beech (Fagus sylvatica), Alder buckthorn (Frangula alnus), Pedunculate oak (Quercus robur) and Manna Ash (Fraxinus ornus), Buck's-beard (Aruncus dioicus), Ground-elder (Aegopodium podagraria), hawthorn (Crataegus monogyna), Anthriscus and Rosa canina in Spring and Summer. The larvae develop in fungi infested dead branches of deciduous trees. The larval development is annual and the adult hatches from the end of May to the middle of June. The adults are usually seen in flowers of hawthorn Crataegus monogyna, rowan (Sorbus aucuparia), whitebeam (Sorbus intermedia), cow parsley (Anthriscus sylvestris) and Apiaceae.

Some parasitoid's (Dolichomitus agnoscendus, Ichneumonidae and Cenocoelius aartseni, Braconidae) live in close association with these longhorns.

== Gallery ==
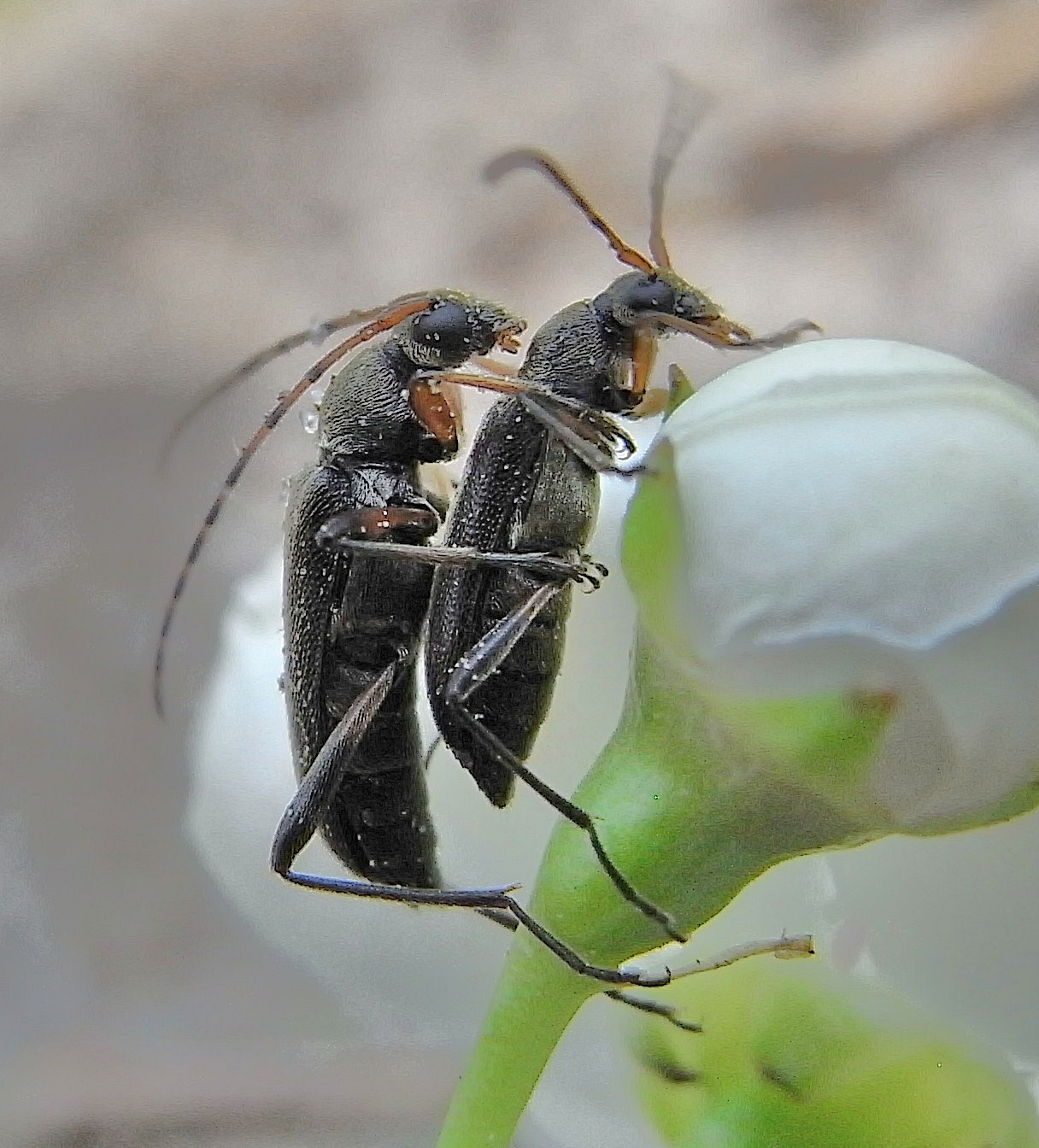
Mating couple

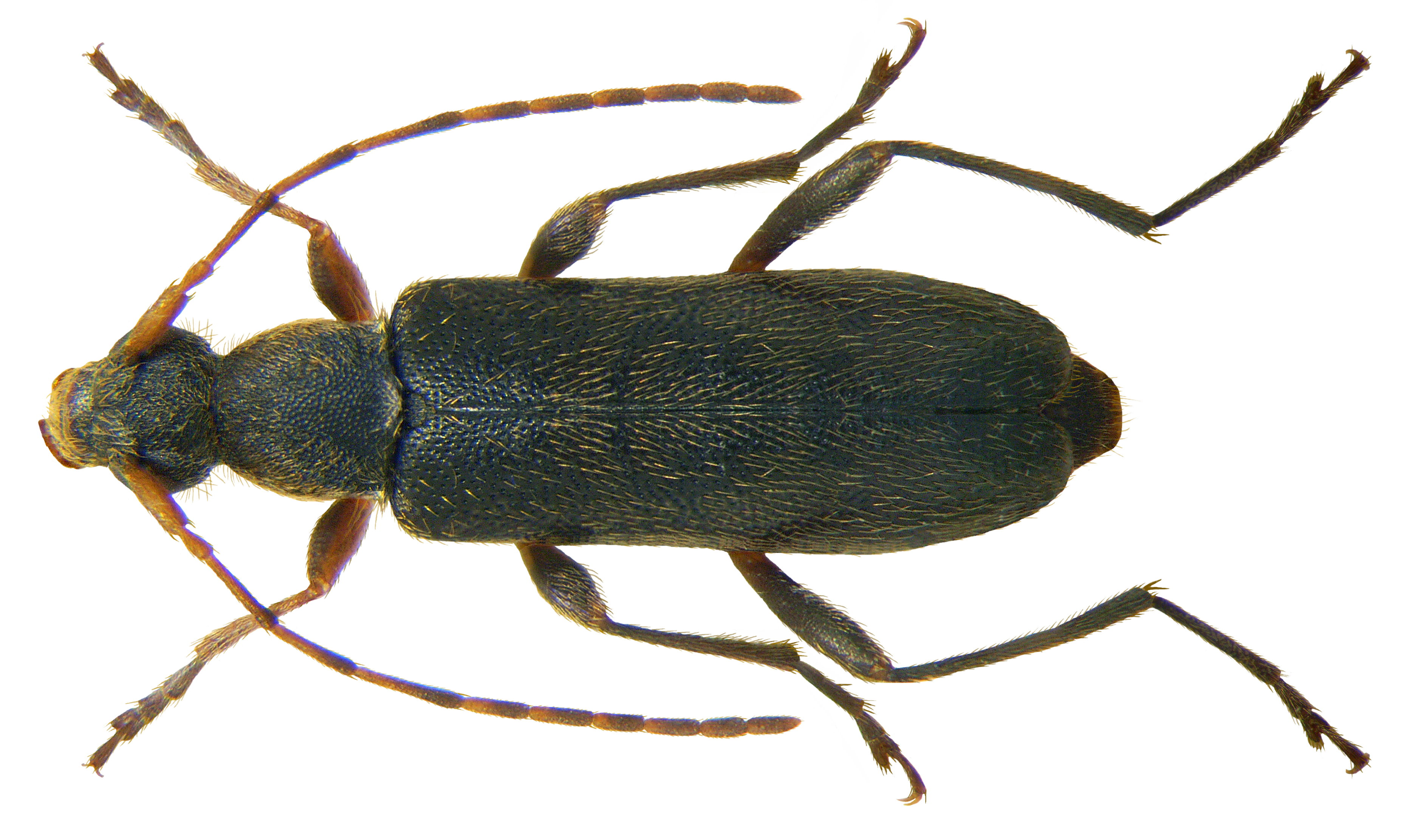
Mounted specimen
