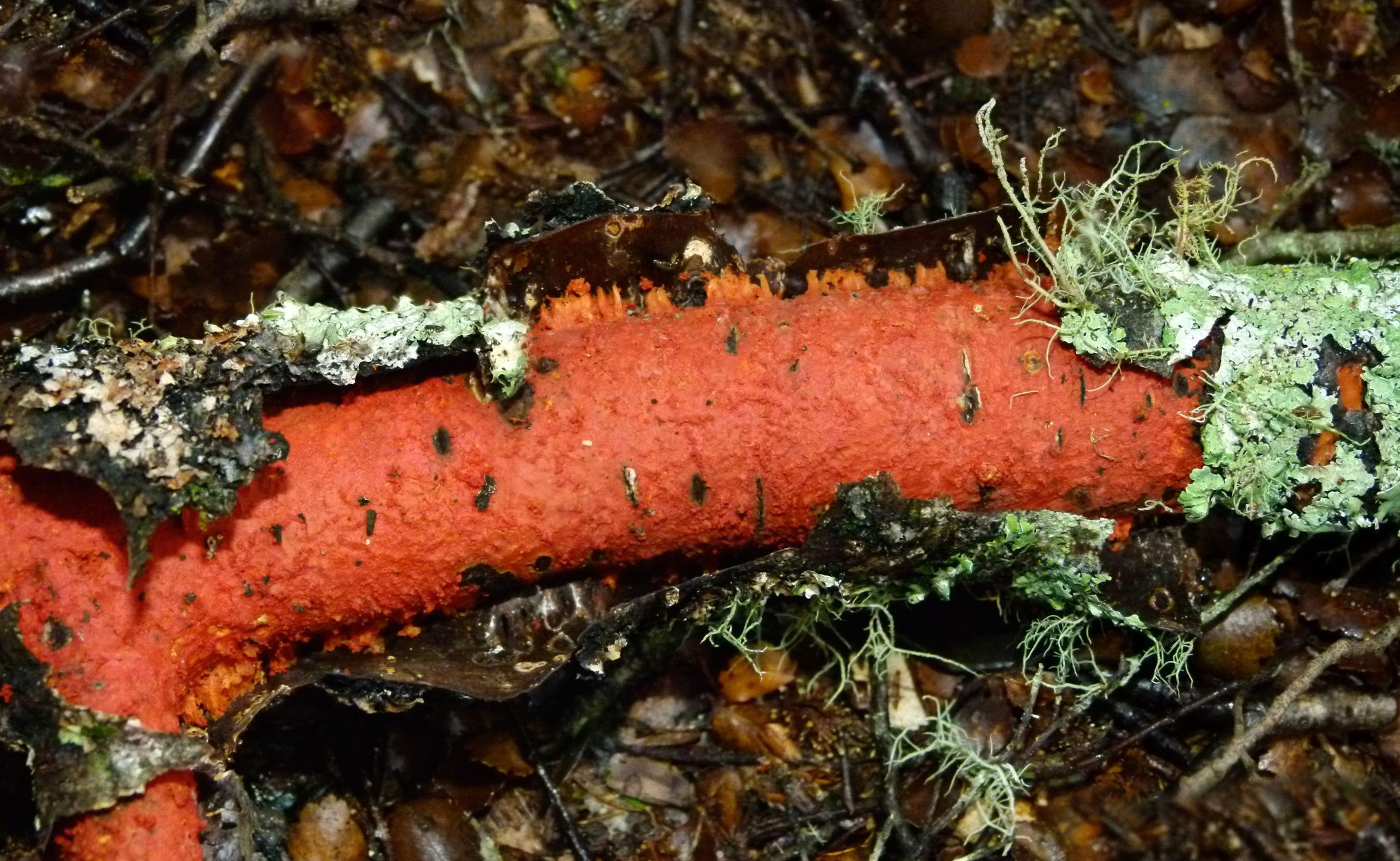

Scientific classification
- Domain: Eukaryota
- Kingdom: Fungi
- Division: Basidiomycota
- Class: Agaricomycetes
- Order: Corticiales
- Family: Vuilleminiaceae
- Genus: Australovuilleminia; Ghobad-Nejhad & Hallenb.
- Species: A. coccinea

Binomial name
- Australovuilleminia coccinea Ghobad-Nejhad & Hallenb.

= Australovuilleminia =

Australovuilleminia coccinea

Genus of fungi

Australovuilleminia is a genus of fungus in the family Vuilleminiaceae. The monotypic genus was described in 2010 to contain the corticioid species Australovuilleminia coccinea from New Zealand, formerly misdetermined as Vuilleminia comedens.
