= Grammoptera molybdica =

Scientific classification
- Kingdom: Animalia
- Phylum: Arthropoda
- Class: Insecta
- Order: Coleoptera
- Suborder: Polyphaga
- Infraorder: Cucujiformia
- Family: Cerambycidae
- Genus: Grammoptera
- Species: G. molybdica

Binomial name
- Grammoptera molybdica (LeConte, 1850)

Species of beetle

Grammoptera molybdica is a species of beetle in the family Cerambycidae. It was described by John Lawrence LeConte in 1850.
