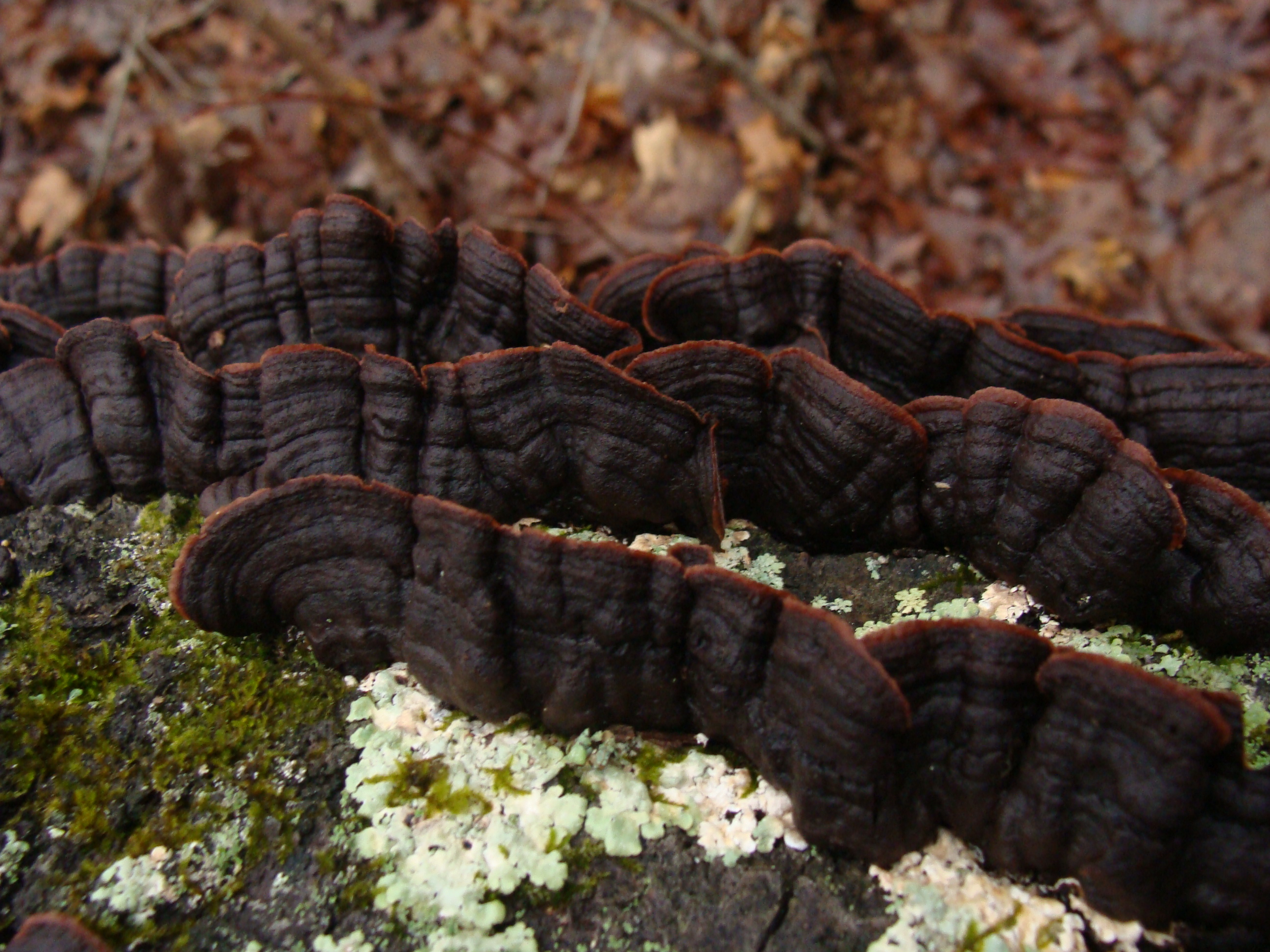
- Punctularia strigoso-zonata

Scientific classification
- Kingdom: Fungi
- Division: Basidiomycota
- Class: Agaricomycetes
- Order: Corticiales
- Family: Punctulariaceae; Donk (1964)

Type genus
- Punctularia Pat. (1895)

Genera
- Dendrocorticium; Punctularia; Punctulariopsis

= Punctulariaceae =

Family of fungi

The Punctulariaceae are a family of fungi in the order Corticiales. The family in its current sense is based on molecular research and contains just three genera of corticioid fungi.

== Taxonomy ==
=== History ===
The family was introduced by Dutch mycologist Marinus Anton Donk in 1964 to accommodate Punctularia, a genus of corticioid fungi whose species are distinguished by forming effused basidiocarps (fruit bodies) with the hymenium (spore-bearing surface) in patches, rather than evenly distributed over the surface. Donk placed the family within the Aphyllophorales. The family was not, however, widely adopted, most mycological texts preferring to place all corticioid fungi (including Punctularia species) in the Corticiaceae.

=== Current status ===
Molecular research, based on cladistic analysis of DNA sequences, has resurrected and redefined the Punctulariaceae for a small clade of corticioid fungi distinct from the Corticiaceae and Vuilleminiaceae. At present, the family only contains a dozen or so species of the genera Dendrocorticium, Punctularia, and Punctulariopsis.

== Distribution and habitat ==
All fungi within the family are wood-rotting saprotrophs, growing on dead attached branches of trees and shrubs. Distribution is cosmopolitan.
