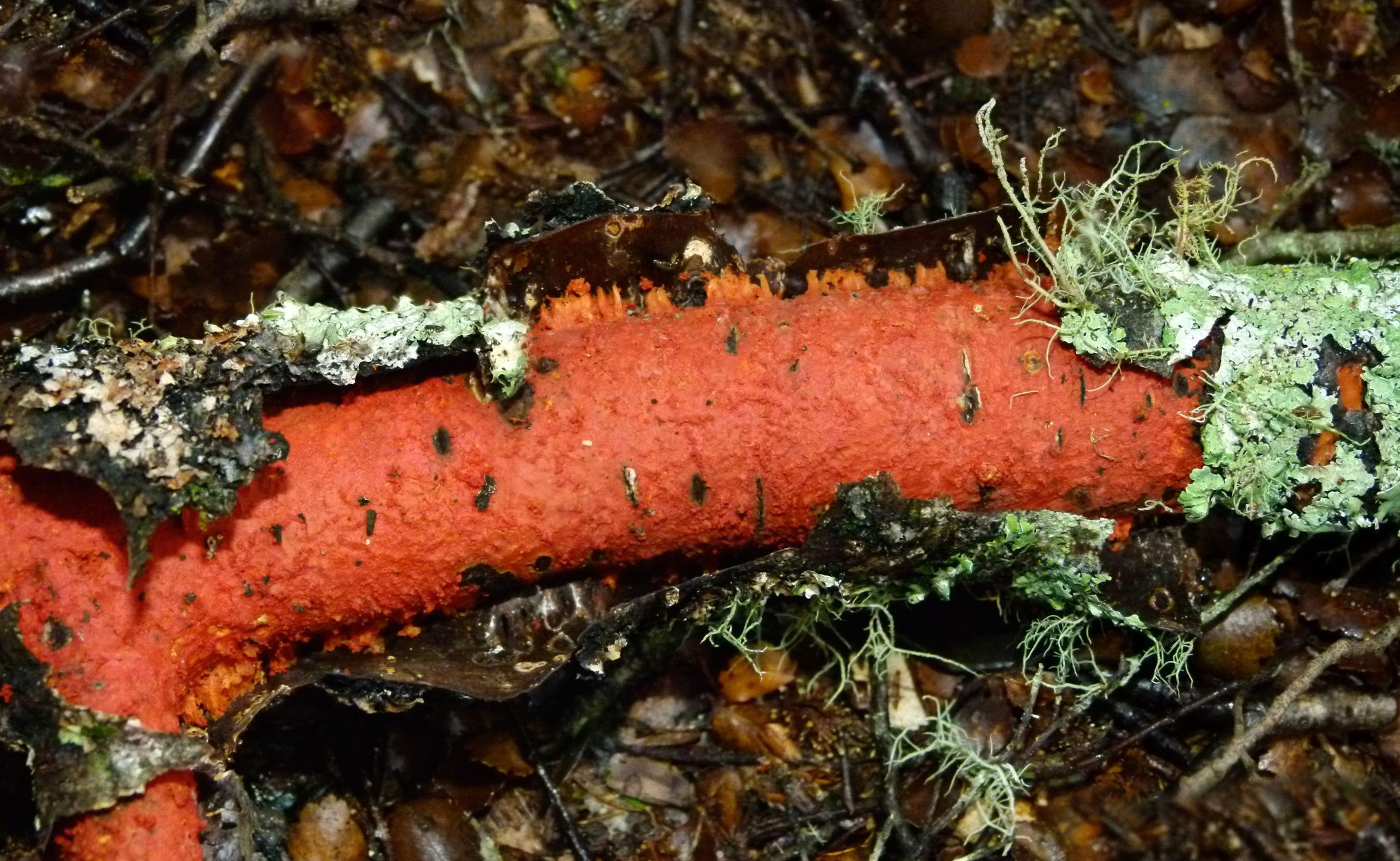
- Australovuilleminia coccinea

Scientific classification
- Kingdom: Fungi
- Division: Basidiomycota
- Class: Agaricomycetes
- Order: Corticiales
- Family: Vuilleminiaceae; Maire ex Lotsy (1907)

Type genus
- Vuilleminia Maire

Genera
- Australovuilleminia Ghobad-Nejhad & Hallenb. Cytidia Quél. Vuilleminia Maire

= Vuilleminiaceae =

Family of fungi

The Vuilleminiaceae are a family of fungi in the order Corticiales. The family in its current sense is based on molecular research and contains just three genera of temperate corticioid fungi.

== Taxonomy ==
=== History ===
The concept of the family was introduced by French mycologist René Maire in 1902, but the name "Vuilleminiacaeae" was not published till 1907 when Johannes Paulus Lotsy adopted Maire's concepts for his work on fungal systematics. As originally conceived, the family accommodated species within the corticioid fungi having "chiastic" basidia (basidia with nuclear spindles arranged transversely), thought to be a primitive character linking the Vuilleminiaceae with the Tulasnellaceae and the Tremellales. The family was not, however, widely adopted, most mycological texts preferring to place all corticioid fungi (including Vuilleminia species) in the Corticiaceae.

The latter name was, however, not published till 1910, making the Vuilleminiaceae an earlier name for the group, as noted by Jülich in 1981. As a result, the Corticiaceae was conserved against the Vuilleminiaceae under the International Code of Botanical Nomenclature, but this suppression of the name only applies if the two families are considered identical.

=== Current status ===
Molecular research, based on cladistic analysis of DNA sequences, has resurrected and redefined the Vuilleminiaceae for a small clade of corticioid fungi distinct from the Corticiaceae. At present, the family only contains species of the genera Australovuilleminia, Cytidia, and Vuilleminia.

== Habitat and distribution ==
All fungi within the family are wood-rotting saprotrophs, growing on dead attached branches of trees and shrubs. Distribution is exclusively temperate, Cytidia and Vuilleminia species being found in the northern hemisphere and Australovuilleminia species in the southern. Only 12 species are currently included within the family.
