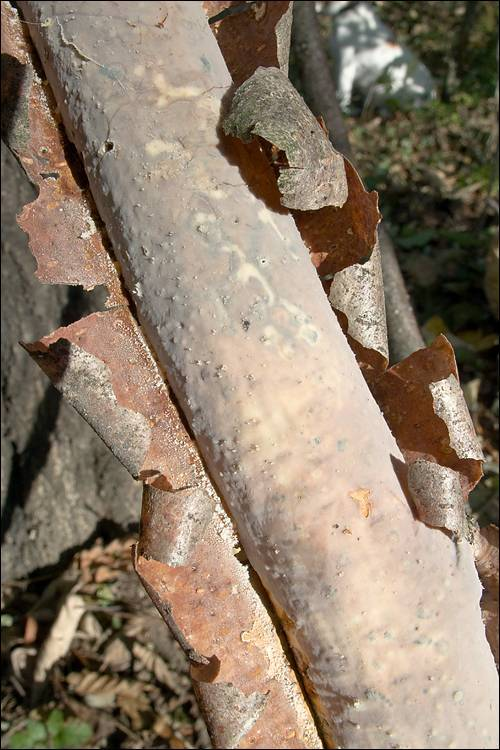
- Vuilleminia comedens

Scientific classification
- Kingdom: Fungi
- Division: Basidiomycota
- Class: Agaricomycetes
- Order: Corticiales
- Family: Vuilleminiaceae
- Genus: Vuilleminia; Maire (1902)

Type species
- Vuilleminia comedens (Nees) Maire (1902)

Species
- 10, see text

= Vuilleminia =

Genus of fungi

Vuilleminia is a genus of corticioid fungi in the family Vuilleminiaceae. It is named after the French mycologist Paul Vuillemin. According to a 2008 estimate, the genus contains 10 species which collectively have a widespread distribution.

== Species ==
- Vuilleminia alni
- Vuilleminia comedens
- Vuilleminia corticola
- Vuilleminia coryli
- Vuilleminia cystidiata
- Vuilleminia macrospora
- Vuilleminia maculata
- Vuilleminia megalospora
- Vuilleminia obducens
- Vuilleminia pseudocystidiata
- Vuilleminia subglobispora
