= Quadrangularis =

Quadrangularis means "quadrangular" (having four angles) in Latin. Quadrangularis is the species name in the binomial nomenclature of several species:The name generally describes a four-angled or four-sided feature of the organism, such as a stem or other morphological structure.

== Plantae ==
- Cactus quadrangularis, the mistletoe cactus, a synonym name of Rhipsalis baccifera
- Cassia quadrangularis, the arsenic bush, a synonym name of Senna septemtrionalis (previously included in the genus Cassia)
- Cicendia, quadrangularis, a species of plants in the gentian family
- Corryocactus quadrangularis, s species of plants in the cactus family
- Critonia quadrangularis, a species of plants in the sunflower family
- Cissus quadrangularis, a species of the grape family
- Dorstenia quadrangularis, a synonym name of Dorstenia contrajerva, a species of the mulberry family
- Erithalis quadrangularis, a species of the family Rubiaceae
- Euphorbia quadrangularis, a succulent species of the spurge family
- Gladiolus quadrangularis, a species of the iris family
- Melicope quadrangularis, four angle melicope or four-angled pelea, a species of the citrus family
- Miconia quadrangularis, a species of the glory bush family
- Microstylis quadrangularis, a synonym name of Malaxis excavata, a species of orchid
- Montanoa quadrangularis, a species of the sunflower tribe
- Myrtus quadrangularis, a synonym name of Syzygium antisepticum
- Passiflora quadrangularis, giant granadilla, a species of the genus Passiflora
- Peperomia quadrangularis, a species of the pepper family
- Phyllostachys quadrangularis, squares-stemmed bamboo, a species of bamboo
- Rhigospira quadrangularis, the sole species of the genus Rhigospira, in the dogbane family
- Sauropus quadrangularis, a species of the family Phyllanthaceae
- Smilax quadrangularis, a synonym name of Smilax rotundifolia, roundleaf greenbrier
- Syngonanthus quadrangularis, a species of the pipewort family
- Tarenna quadrangularis, a species of the family Rubiaceae
- Tillandsia quadrangularis, a synonym name of Tillandsia juncea, a species of the pineapple family
- Tithymalus quadrangularis, a synonym name of Euphorbia canariensis, Canary Island spurge

== Animalia ==
- Alona quadrangularis, a species of water fleas, the type species of its genus
- Ancistrocrania quadrangularis, a species in the extinct genus Ancistrocrania of the lamp shell family
- Bagworm moth, species that build a box-shaped bag:
  - Oiketicus quadrangularis
  - Psyche quadrangularis, a moth of the family Psychidae
- Brasilodon quadrangularis, a species of the extinct genus Brasilodon
- Colochirus quadrangularis, thorny sea cucumber, a species of sea cucumber
- Crotalus triseriatus quadrangularis, a synonym name of Crotalus aquilus, a species of venomous pit vipers
- Dicyrtoma quadrangularis, a species of the globular springtails in the family Dicyrtomidae
- Funiculina quadrangularis, a species of sea pen
- Holothuria quadrangularis, a synonym name of Stichopus chloronotus, a species of sea cucumber
- Hoploscaphites quadrangularis, a species of the extinct ammonite genus Hoploscaphites
- Lepyronia quadrangularis, a species of spittle bug
- Neilonella quadrangularis, a species of saltwater clams in the family Neilonellidae
- Orthonychia quadrangularis, a sea snail species of the extinct family Orthonychiidae
- Pseudotritonia quadrangularis, a species of the sea slug family Charcotiidae
- Styela quadrangularis, a synonym name of Polycarpa pomaria, a species of sea squirt
- Trigonia quadrangularis, a species in the extinct genus Trigonia of the saltwater clam family Trigoniidae
- Vermiculus spiratus var. quadrangularis, a synonym name of Vermicularia spirata, West Indian worm-shell sea snail

== See also ==
- Membrana quadrangularis, the scientific name of the quadrangular membrane, part of the human larynx
- Quadrangularis Reversum, a musical instrument built by Harry Partch
