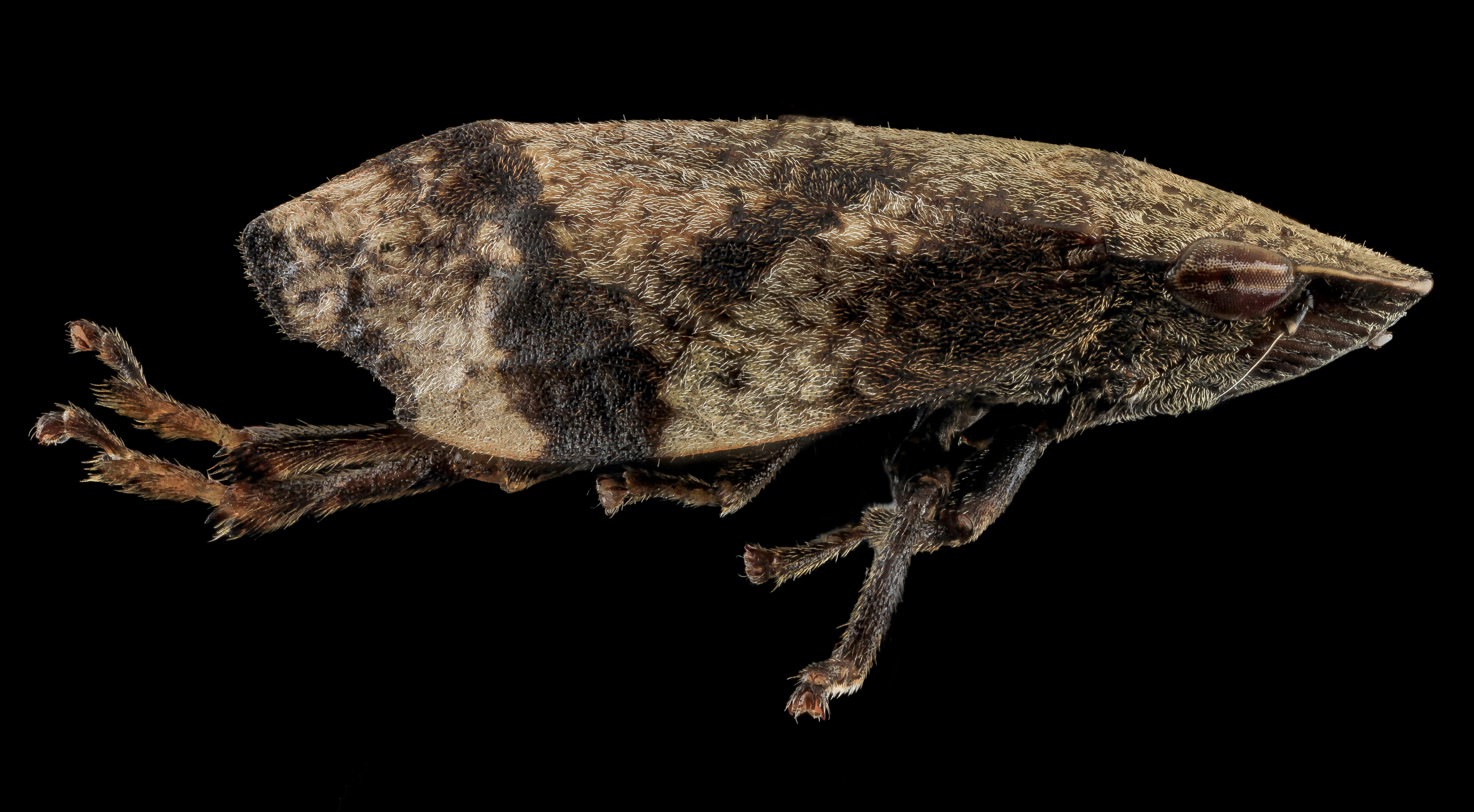

Scientific classification
- Domain: Eukaryota
- Kingdom: Animalia
- Phylum: Arthropoda
- Class: Insecta
- Order: Hemiptera
- Suborder: Auchenorrhyncha
- Family: Aphrophoridae
- Genus: Lepyronia
- Species: L. angulifera

Binomial name
- Lepyronia angulifera Uhler, 1876

= Lepyronia angulifera =

Species of true bug

Lepyronia angulifera, the angular spittlebug, is a species of spittlebug in the family Aphrophoridae. It is found in the Caribbean Sea and North America. Host plants for nymphs include Sporobolus indicus and Cyperus swartzii. They prefer fen habitat.

== Subspecies ==
These two subspecies belong to the species Lepyronia angulifera:

- Lepyronia angulifera angulifera
- Lepyronia angulifera robusta Metcalf & Bruner
