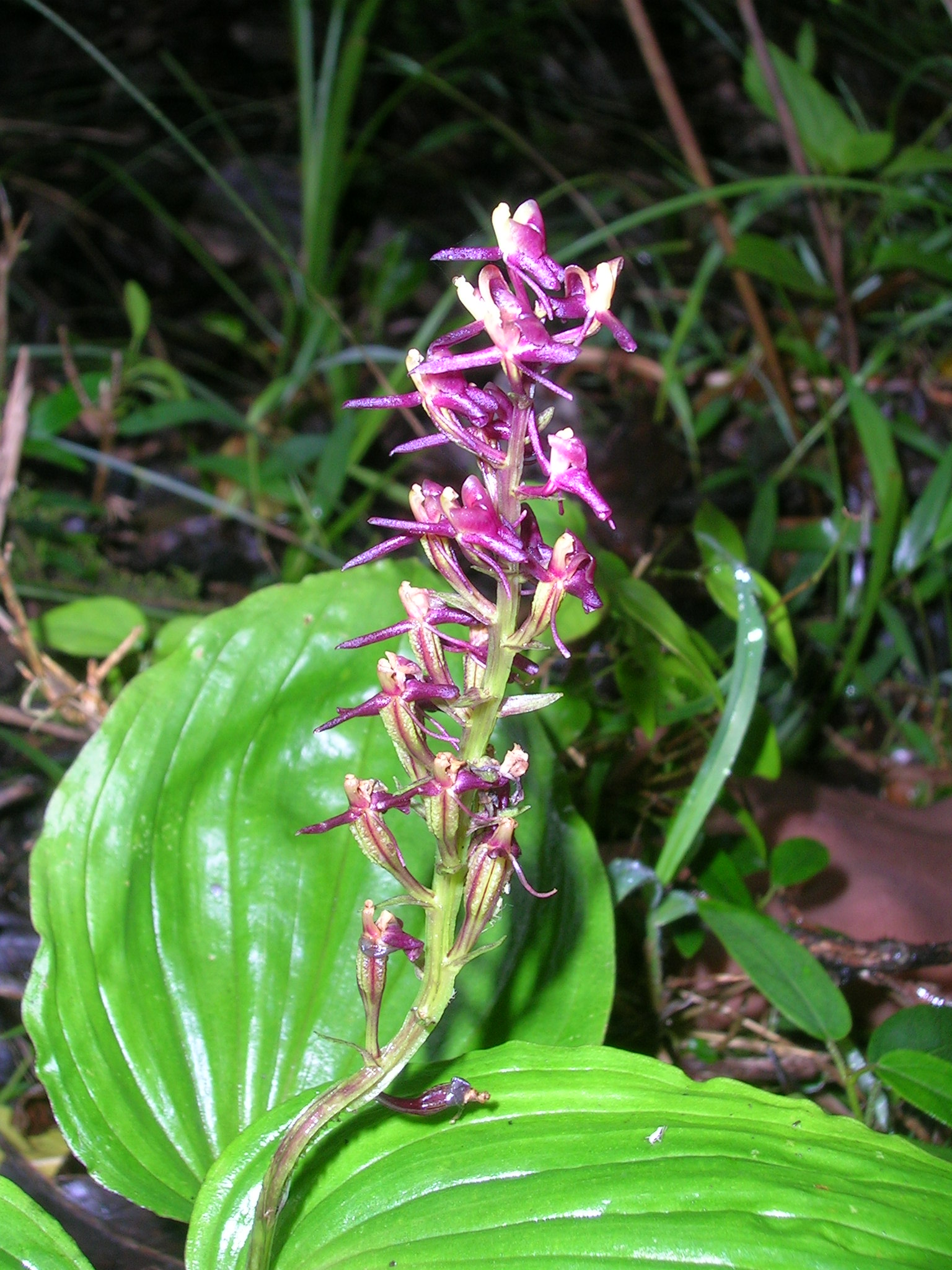
- Manjur, Nilgiris, India

Scientific classification
- Kingdom: Plantae
- Clade: Tracheophytes
- Clade: Angiosperms
- Clade: Monocots
- Order: Asparagales
- Family: Orchidaceae
- Subfamily: Epidendroideae
- Genus: Malaxis
- Species: M. densiflora

Binomial name
- Malaxis densiflora (A.Rich.) Kuntze 1891

Synonyms
- Malaxis densiflora A. Rich. & Galeotti ex Ridl. 1888, not validly published; Corymborkis densiflora]] (A.Rich.) M.R.Almeida; Liparis densiflora]] A.Rich. 1841; Malaxis densiflora var. luteola (Wight) P.K.Sarkar; Microstylis densiflora]] (A.Rich.) Alston; Microstylis luteola]] Wight; Microstylis pratensis]] Ridl.; Microstylis versicolor Wight 1851 not Lindl. 1830; Microstylis versicolor var. luteola (Wight) Hook.f.; Seidenfia densiflora]] (A.Rich.) Szlach.

= Malaxis densiflora =

Species of orchid

Malaxis densiflora is a species of orchid native to southern India. It generally has two leaves and purple flowers.
