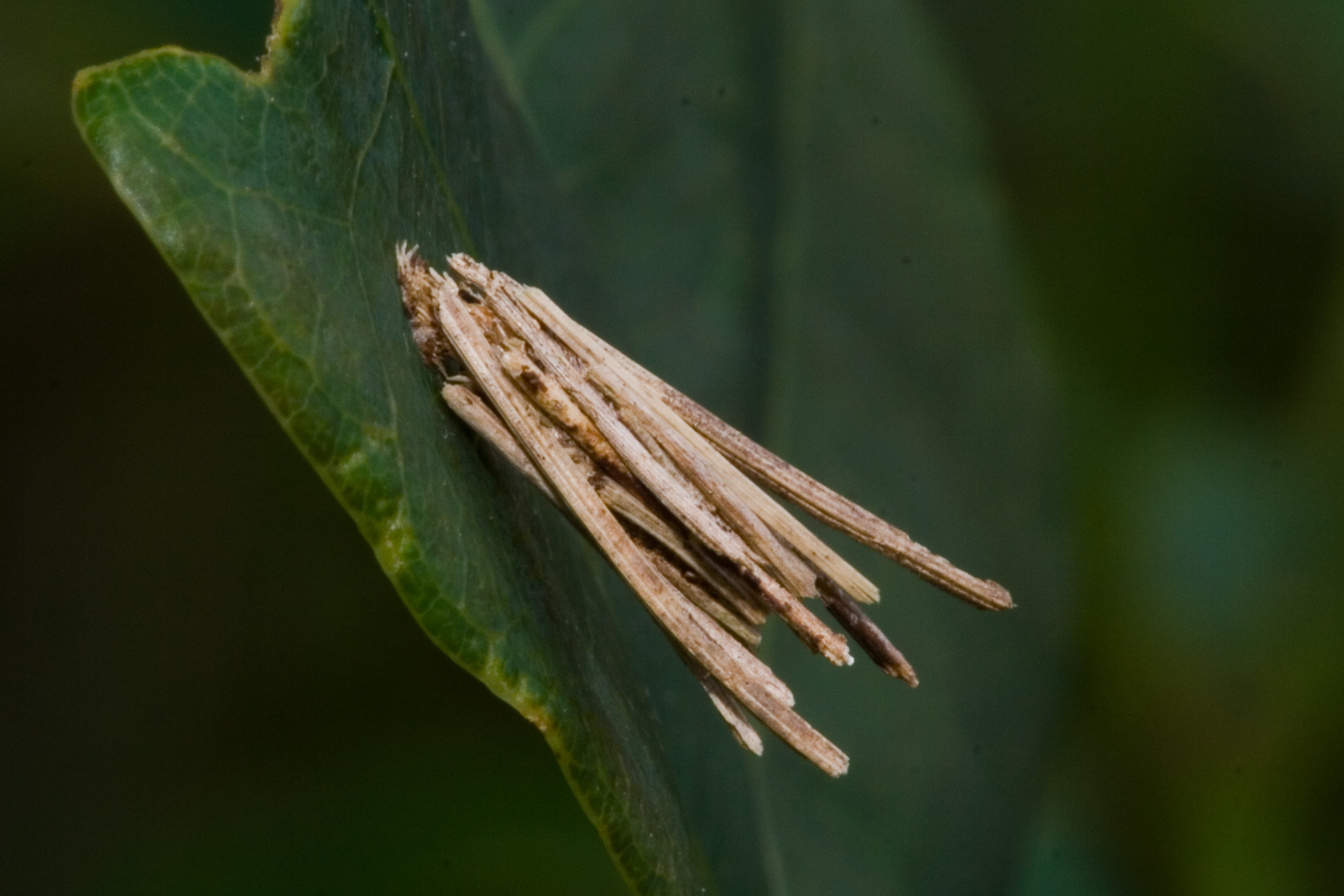
- Psyche casta case

Scientific classification
- Domain: Eukaryota
- Kingdom: Animalia
- Phylum: Arthropoda
- Class: Insecta
- Order: Lepidoptera
- Family: Psychidae
- Genus: Psyche; Schrank, 1801

Type species
- Psyche carpini Schrank, 1802

Synonyms
- Fumaria Haworth, 1811; Fumea Haworth, 1812; Saccofera Sodoffsky, 1837; Masonia Tutt, 1900

= Psyche (moth) =

Genus of moths

Psyche is a genus of moths in the family Psychidae (bagworm moths).

== Species ==
- Psyche baikalensis (Raigorodskaia, 1965)
- Psyche brachycornis Kozhanchikov, 1956
- Psyche bundeli (Solyanikov, 1995)
- Psyche burmeisteri Weyenbergh, 1884
- Psyche casta (Pallas, 1767)
- Psyche crassiorella Bruand, 1851
- Psyche dyaulensis Sobczyk, 2011
- Psyche edwardsiella (Tutt, 1900)
- Psyche elongatella (Kozhanchikov, 1956)
- Psyche fatalis (Meyrick, 1926)
- Psyche flavicapitella (Romieux, 1937)
- Psyche ghilarovi (Solanikov, 1991)
- Psyche hedini (Caradja, 1934)
- Psyche hissarica (Solyanikov, 1993)
- Psyche kunashirica Solyanikov, 2000
- Psyche libanotica (Zerny, 1933)
- Psyche limulus (Rogenhofer, 1889)
- Psyche luticoma (Meyrick, 1918)
- Psyche minutella Fourcroy, 1785
- Psyche nebulella Maassen, 1890
- Psyche obscurata (Meyrick, 1917)
- Psyche ominosa (Meyrick, 1918)
- Psyche pinicola (Meyrick, 1937)
- Psyche psycodella Costa, [1836]
- Psyche pyrenaea (Bourgogne, 1961)
- Psyche quadrangularis (Christoph, 1873)
- Psyche rassei (Sieder, 1975)
- Psyche rouasti (Heylaerts, 1879)
- Psyche samoana (Tams, 1935)
- Psyche saxicolella Bruand, 1851
- Psyche semnodryas (Meyrick, 1922)
- Psyche servicula (Meyrick, 1917)
- Psyche sichotealinica (Solyanikov, 1981)
- Psyche syriaca (Rebel, 1917)
- Psyche taiwana (Wileman & South, 1917)
- Psyche trimenii (Heylaerts, 1891)
- Psyche tubifer
- Psyche yeongwolensis Byun & Roh, 2016

== Former species ==
- Psyche assamica Watt, 1898
- Psyche breviserrata (Sieder, 1963)
- Psyche careyi Macalister, 1870
- Psyche chilensis Philippi, 1860
- Psyche danieli (Sieder, 1958)
- Psyche luteipalpis Walker, 1870
- Psyche nigrimanus (Walker, 1870)
- Psyche niphonica (Hori, 1926)
- Psyche norvegica (Heylaerts, 1882)
- Psyche plumifera Ochsenheimer, 1810
- Psyche takahashii Sonan, 1935
- Psyche ussuriensis (Kozhanchikov, 1956)
