= Malaxis ehrenbergii =

Scientific classification
- Kingdom: Plantae
- Clade: Tracheophytes
- Clade: Angiosperms
- Clade: Monocots
- Order: Asparagales
- Family: Orchidaceae
- Subfamily: Epidendroideae
- Genus: Malaxis
- Species: M. ehrenbergii

Binomial name
- Malaxis ehrenbergii (Rchb.f.) Kuntze 1891

Synonyms
- List: Malaxis arachnifera (Ridl.) Kuntze; Malaxis ehrenbergii var. platyglossa (B.L.Rob. & Greenm.) L.O.Williams; Malaxis minutiflora (Schltr.) Ames; Malaxis platyglossa (B.L.Rob. & Greenm.) Ames; Microstylis arachnifera Ridl.; Microstylis ehrenbergii Rchb.f. 1850; Microstylis minutiflora Schltr.; Microstylis platyglossa B.L.Rob. & Greenm.; Tamayorkis ehrenbergii (Rchb.f.) R.González & Szlach.; Tamayorkis platyglossa (B.L.Rob. & Greenm.) Szlach.

Species of orchid

Malaxis ehrenbergii, the Ehrenberg's adder's-mouth orchid, is a Mesoamerican species of orchid native to northwestern Mexico. It has been found in Mexico, Guatemala, and El Salvador.
