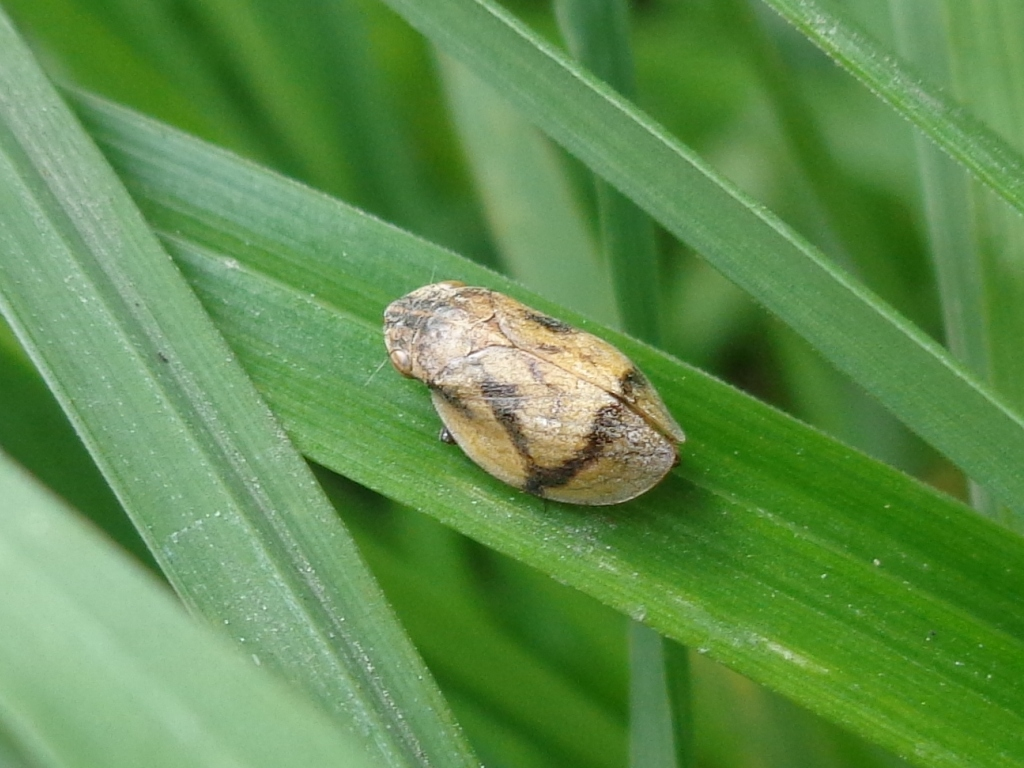
- Lepyronia coleoptrata in Latvia

Scientific classification
- Domain: Eukaryota
- Kingdom: Animalia
- Phylum: Arthropoda
- Class: Insecta
- Order: Hemiptera
- Suborder: Auchenorrhyncha
- Family: Aphrophoridae
- Genus: Lepyronia; Amyot & Serville, 1843

species
- see text

= Lepyronia =

Genus of true bugs

Lepyronia is a genus of froghoppers in the family Aphrophoridae.

== Species ==
The genus includes the following species:

- Lepyronia angulata Lalleman & Synave, 1955
- Lepyronia angulifera Uhler, 1876
- Lepyronia batrachoides Haupt, 1917
- Lepyronia bifasciata Liu, 1942
- Lepyronia coleoptrata (Linnaeus, 1758)
- Lepyronia daedalia Distant, 1916
- Lepyronia geminata Jacobi, 1921
- Lepyronia gibbosa Ball, 1899
- Lepyronia gracilior Lindberg, 1923
- Lepyronia koreana Matsumura, 1915
- Lepyronia limbata Kato, 1933
- Lepyronia obliqua Jacobi, 1921
- Lepyronia okadae (Matsumura, 1903)
- Lepyronia picta Melichar, 1903
- Lepyronia quadrangularis (Say, 1825)
- Lepyronia sordida Stål, 1864
- Lepyronia v-nigrum Jacobi, 1921
