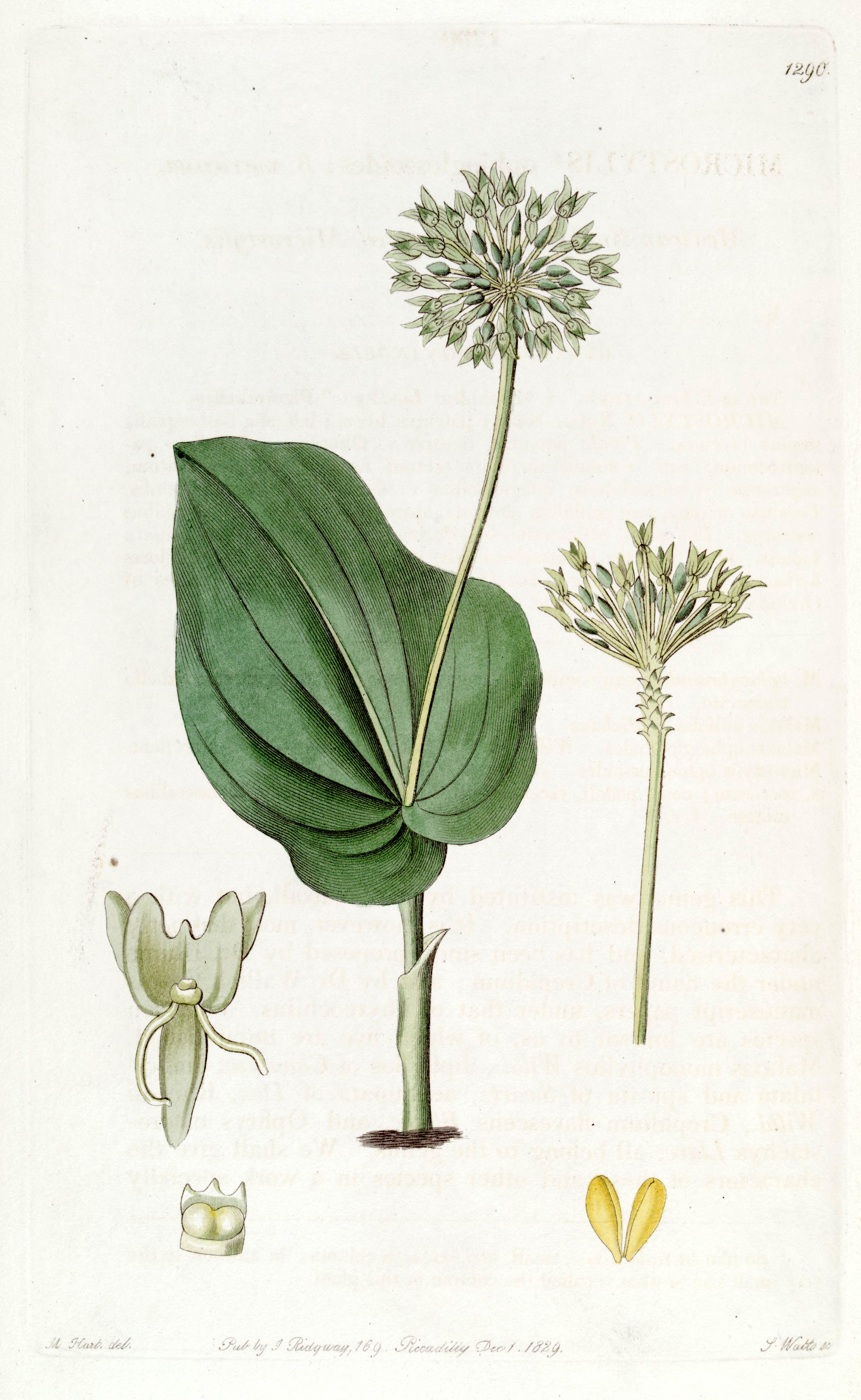
- 1829 illustration

Conservation status
- Secure (NatureServe)

Scientific classification
- Kingdom: Plantae
- Clade: Tracheophytes
- Clade: Angiosperms
- Clade: Monocots
- Order: Asparagales
- Family: Orchidaceae
- Subfamily: Epidendroideae
- Genus: Malaxis
- Species: M. unifolia

Binomial name
- Malaxis unifolia Michx. 1803

Synonyms
- Orchis ophioglossoides Walter; Malaxis ophioglossoides Muhl. ex Willd.; Achroanthes unifolia (Michx.) Raf.; Microstylis ophioglossoides (Muhl. ex Willd.) Nutt. ex Eaton; Prescottia ophioglossoides (Muhl. ex Willd.) Spreng.; Microstylis ophioglossoides var. mexicana Lindl.; Achroanthes laxiflora Raf.; Achroanthes obtusifolia Raf.; Malaxis thlaspiformis A.Rich. & Galeotti; Microstylis unifolia (Michx.) Britton, Sterns & Poggenb.; Microstylis grisebachiana Fawc. & Rendle; Malaxis grisebachiana (Fawc. & Rendle) Fawc. & Rendle; Malaxis unifolia f. bifolia Mousley; Malaxis unifolia f. variegata Mousley; Malaxis amplexicolumna E.W.Greenw. & R.Gonzál

= Malaxis unifolia =

Species of orchid

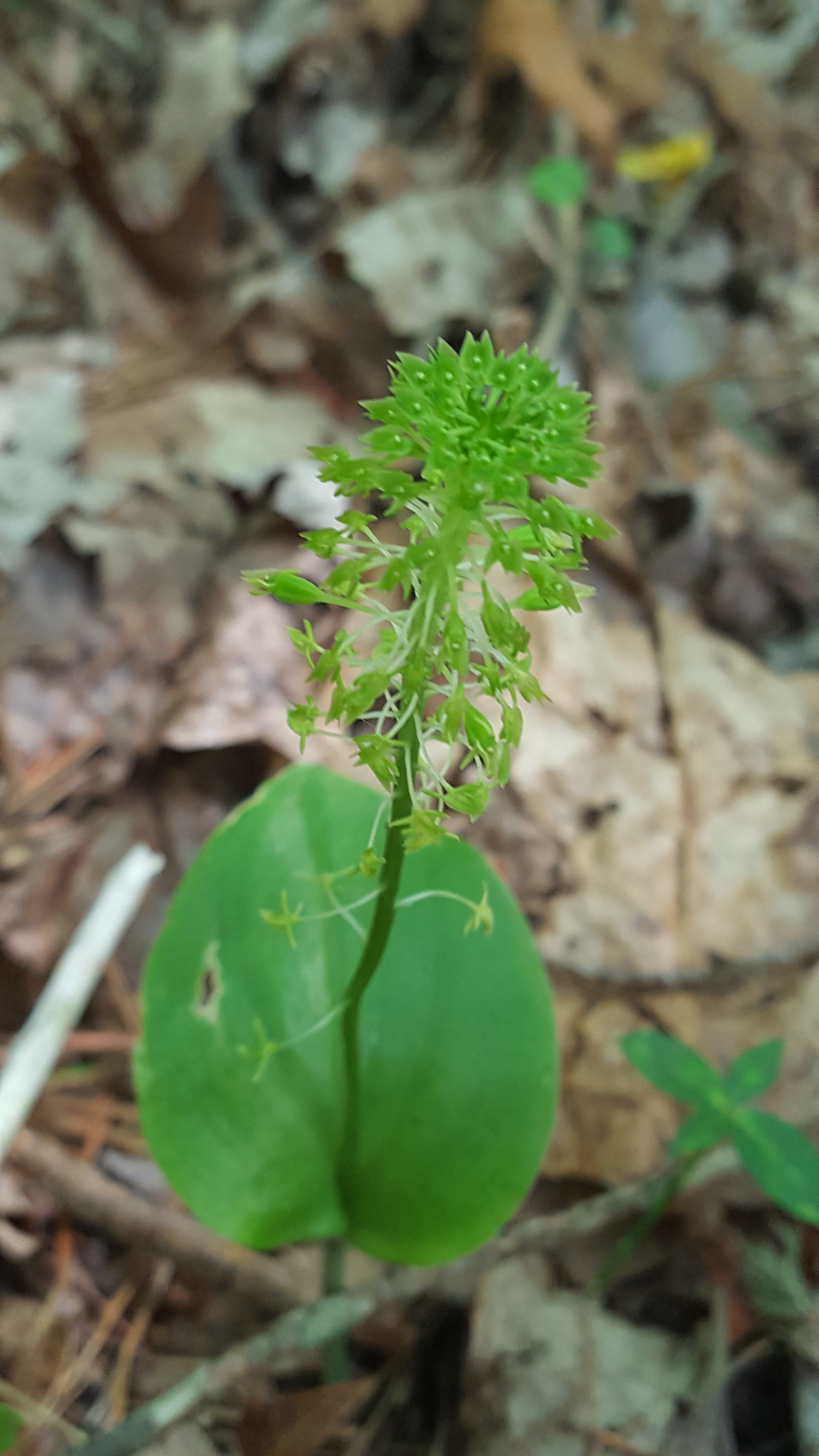
Malaxis unifolia in southern Cumberlands

Malaxis unifolia, or the green adder's-mouth orchid, is a species of orchid occurring from eastern and central Canada (Newfoundland to Manitoba), the central and eastern United States (Maine to Florida, west as far as Minnesota, eastern Kansas, and eastern Texas), Mexico, Central America and the Greater Antilles (Cuba, Jamaica, Dominican Republic).

Malaxis unifolia generally has only one leaf and rarely two. Flowers have a green colour, in a raceme. It often resemble an umbel at first before it elongates.

Malaxis unifolia is a small orchid, no more than 50 cm tall. It produces up to 160 small green flowers, with a three-lobed labellum and strongly recurved lateral petals. It flowers in spring and early summer in the northern part of its range, while in the south it blooms later into the fall.
