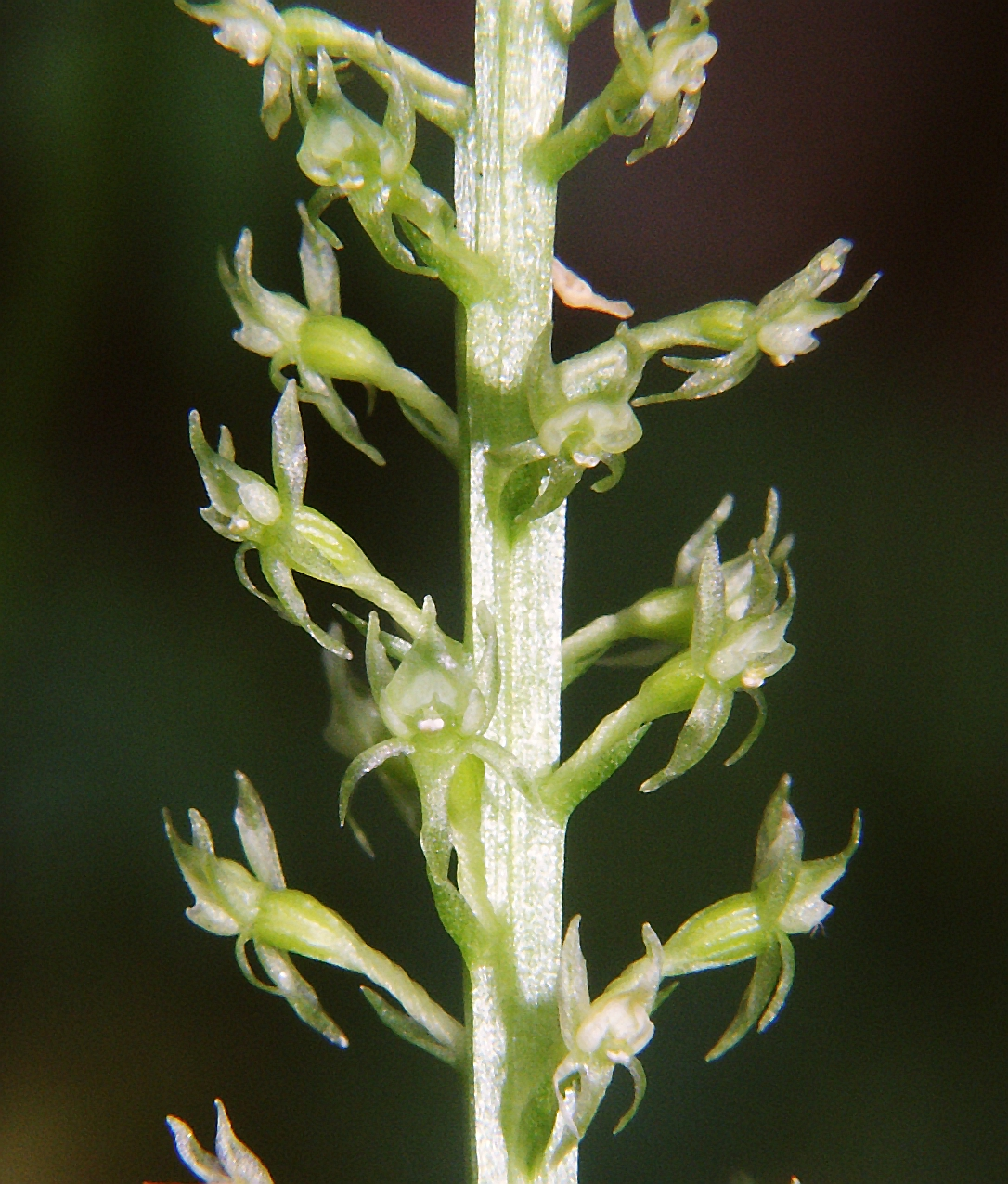

Scientific classification
- Kingdom: Plantae
- Clade: Tracheophytes
- Clade: Angiosperms
- Clade: Monocots
- Order: Asparagales
- Family: Orchidaceae
- Subfamily: Epidendroideae
- Genus: Malaxis
- Species: M. monophyllos

Binomial name
- Malaxis monophyllos (L.) Sw.

Varieties
- M. m. var. brachypoda; M. m. var. monophyllos; M. m. var. obtusa

Synonyms
- List: Achroanthes monophyllos; Epipactis monophylla; Microstylis monophyllos; Ophrys monophyllos

= Malaxis monophyllos =

White adder's mouth

Species of orchid

Malaxis monophyllos, the white adder's mouth, is a terrestrial species of orchid. It is widespread across much of Europe (Germany, Italy, Poland, Scandinavia, Ukraine, etc.), Asia (China, Japan, Russia, Nepal, Philippines, etc.), and much of southern Canada. In the United States, it grows mostly in southern Alaska, New England and the Great Lakes region, with isolated populations reported from Colorado and California.

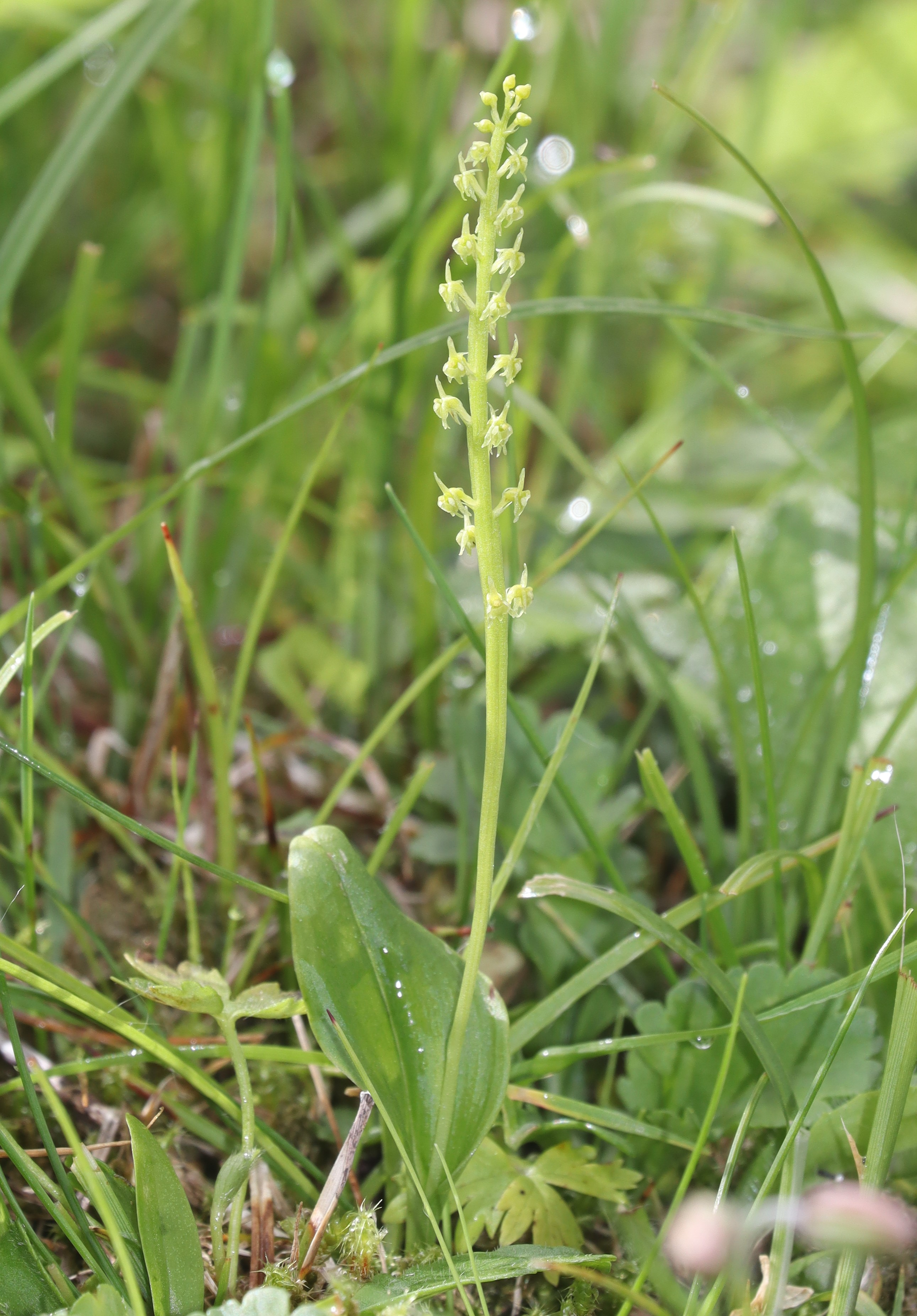
Malaxis monophyllos var. monophyllos growing in the Akaishi Mountains of Japan

== Taxonomy ==
Malaxis monophyllos was given the scientific name Ophrys monophyllos by Carl Linnaeus in 1753. The botanist Olof Swartz moved it to the genus Malaxis in 1800 giving the species its accepted name. Along with its genus it is part of the Orchidaceae family. It has three accepted varieties according to Plants of the World Online.

- Malaxis monophyllos var. brachypoda (A.Gray) P.Morris & Eames
- Malaxis monophyllos var. monophyllos
- Malaxis monophyllos var. obtusa Tsukaya & H.Okada

Malaxis monophyllos and its varieties together have 37 synonyms.

Table of Synonyms
Name	Year	Rank	Synonym of:	Notes
Achroanthes acuminata Raf.	1836	species	subsp. brachypoda	= het., nom. nud.
Achroanthes cilifolia Raf.	1836	species	subsp. monophyllos	= het., nom. nud.
Achroanthes monophyllos (L.) Greene	1891	species	M. monophyllos	≡ hom.
Achroanthes monophyllos f. diphyllos (Cham.) Koidz. ex Masam.	1916	form	subsp. monophyllos	= het.
Dienia gmelinii Lindl.	1830	species	subsp. monophyllos	= het.
Epipactis monophylla (L.) F.W.Schmidt	1795	species	M. monophyllos	≡ hom.
Leptorkis japonica (Miq.) Kuntze	1891	species	subsp. monophyllos	= het.
Liparis inconspicua Makino	1892	species	subsp. monophyllos	= het., nom. nud.
Liparis japonica (Miq.) Maxim.	1886	species	subsp. monophyllos	= het.
Malaxis arisanensis (Hayata) S.Y.Hu	1974	species	subsp. monophyllos	= het.
Malaxis brachypoda (A.Gray) Fernald	1926	species	subsp. brachypoda	≡ hom.
Malaxis brachypoda f. bifolia (Mousley) Fernald	1950	form	subsp. brachypoda	= het.
Malaxis diphyllos Cham.	1828	species	subsp. monophyllos	= het.
Malaxis monophyllos f. bifolia Mousley	1927	form	subsp. brachypoda	= het.
Malaxis monophyllos subsp. brachypoda (A.Gray) Á.Löve & D.Löve	1969	subspecies	subsp. brachypoda	≡ hom.
Malaxis monophyllos var. diphyllos (Cham.) Luer	1975	variety	subsp. monophyllos	= het.
Malaxis monophyllos f. diphyllos (Cham.) Soó	1969	form	subsp. monophyllos	= het.
Malaxis monophyllos f. triphyllos Soó	1938	form	subsp. monophyllos	= het.
Malaxis muscifera var. stelostachya Tang & F.T.Wang	1951	variety	subsp. monophyllos	= het.
Malaxis taiwaniana S.S.Ying	1975	species	subsp. monophyllos	= het.
Malaxis yunnanensis (Schltr.) Tang & F.T.Wang	1951	species	subsp. monophyllos	= het.
Malaxis yunnanensis var. nematophylla Tang & F.T.Wang	1951	variety	subsp. monophyllos	= het.
Microstylis arisanensis Hayata	1916	species	subsp. monophyllos	= het.
Microstylis brachypoda A.Gray	1836	species	subsp. brachypoda	≡ hom.
Microstylis diphylla (Cham.) Lindl.	1830	species	subsp. monophyllos	= het.
Microstylis japonica Miq.	1866	species	subsp. monophyllos	= het.
Microstylis monophyllos (L.) Lindl.	1830	species	M. monophyllos	≡ hom.
Microstylis monophyllos var. bifolia (Mousley) Marg.	2007	variety	subsp. brachypoda	= het.
Microstylis monophyllos subsp. brachypoda (A.Gray) Szlach. & Marg.	2006	subspecies	subsp. brachypoda	≡ hom.
Microstylis monophyllos var. diphyllos (Cham.) Nakai	1952	variety	subsp. monophyllos	= het.
Microstylis monophyllos var. obtusa (Tsukaya & H.Okada) Marg.	2007	variety	subsp. obtusa	≡ hom.
Microstylis muscifera var. nematophylla (Tang & F.T.Wang) Marg.	2012	variety	subsp. monophyllos	= het.
Microstylis muscifera subsp. stelostachya (Tang & F.T.Wang) Marg.	2012	subspecies	subsp. monophyllos	= het.
Microstylis muscifera var. stelostachya (Tang & F.T.Wang) Marg.	2007	variety	subsp. monophyllos	= het.
Microstylis yunnanensis Schltr.	1912	species	subsp. monophyllos	= het.
Microstylis yunnanensis var. nematophylla (Tang & F.T.Wang) Marg.	2007	variety	subsp. monophyllos	= het.
Ophrys monophyllos L.	1753	species	M. monophyllos	≡ hom.
Notes: ≡ homotypic synonym; = heterotypic synonym
