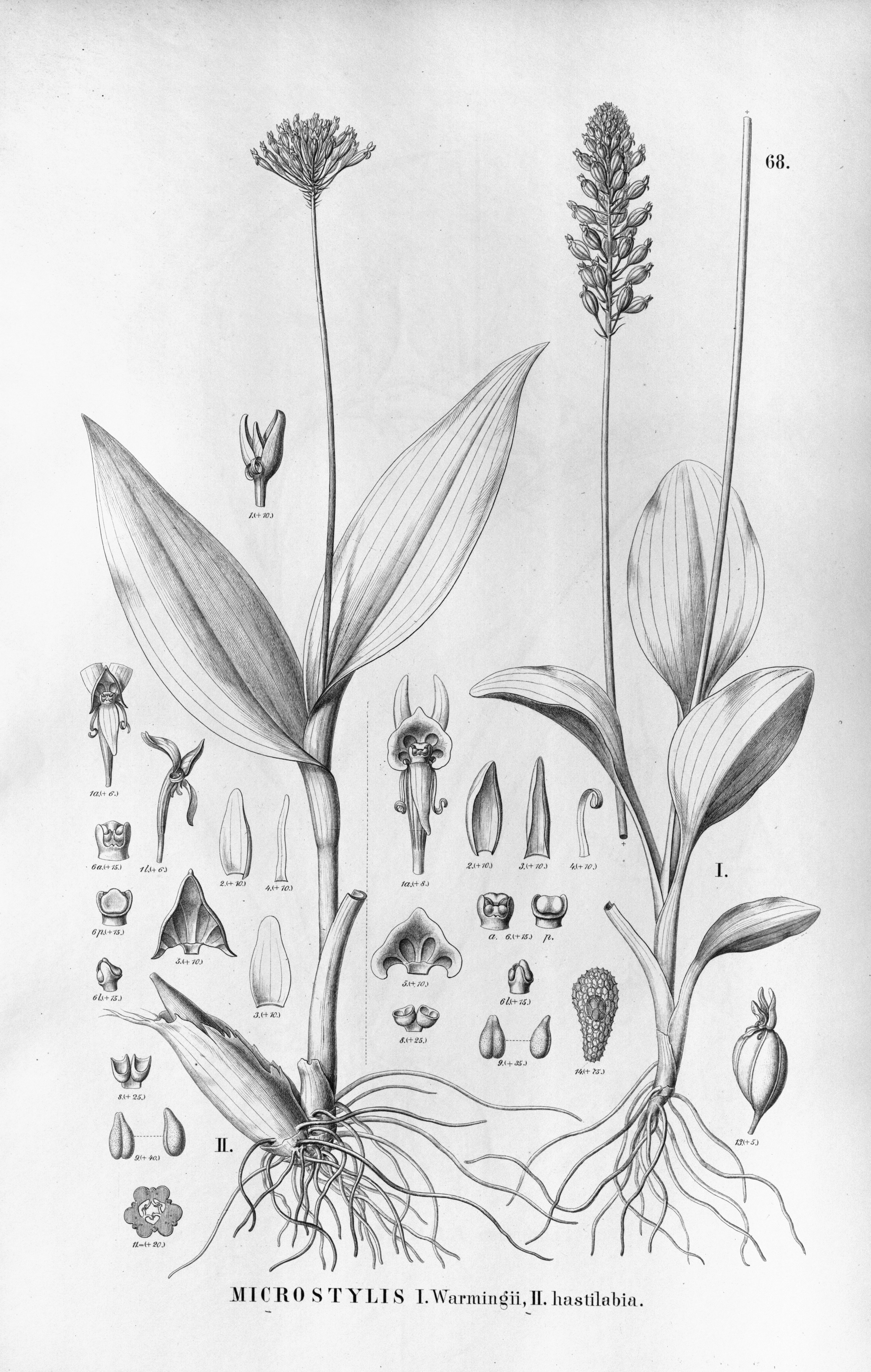
- 1895 drawing Malaxis warmingii is at right as Microstylis warmingii

Scientific classification
- Kingdom: Plantae
- Clade: Tracheophytes
- Clade: Angiosperms
- Clade: Monocots
- Order: Asparagales
- Family: Orchidaceae
- Subfamily: Epidendroideae
- Genus: Malaxis
- Species: M. warmingii

Binomial name
- Malaxis warmingii (Rchb. f.) Kuntze 1891

Synonyms
- Microstylis warmingii Rchb.f. 1878

= Malaxis warmingii =

Species of orchid

Malaxis warmingii is a species of orchid native to Brazil.
