= Malaxis magniauriculata =

- Malaxis magniauriculata inflorescence with the first open flowers

Scientific classification
- Kingdom: Plantae
- Clade: Tracheophytes
- Clade: Angiosperms
- Clade: Monocots
- Order: Asparagales
- Family: Orchidaceae
- Subfamily: Epidendroideae
- Genus: Malaxis
- Species: M. magniauriculata

Binomial name
- Malaxis magniauriculata Salazar, R.Jiménez & Castañeda-Zárate

Species of flowering plant

Flat-topped inflorescence from above

Peduncle arising from leaf base

Petiole base square in cross-section arising from cataphyll top

Plant on mosssy roadcut wall

Malaxis magniauriculata, with no English name other than adder's mouth, which is applied to all species of Malaxis, is an orchid native only to Mexico. It belongs to the family Orchidaceae.

== Description ==
Malaxis magniauriculata is similar to several of the 172 or so species of the genus Malaxis, plus it was recognized as a distinct species only in 2024, so older literature does not include it. Nonetheless, the following combination of key features enables its identification:

- It is a terrestrial plant growing up to 33 cm (13 in) tall, including its inflorescence. The visible part of the orchid arises from an underground corm, which is white, egg-shaped, and measuring up to 20 mm × 15 mm (3/4 in × 1/2 in). When young, the corm is completely covered by the leaf's petiole base, which itself is surrounded by a "corm scale" or cataphyll.
- There is only one leaf, the petiole of which is tubular and squarish in cross-section, with each corner bearing a translucent ridge, or keel. The petiole arises from within the cataphyll. The pale green leaf's blade is somewhat fleshy, ascends upward, has 3 veins and grows up to 68 mm × 37 mm (2 1/2 in × 1 1/2 in). The blade's base varies from rounded to having 2 short, backward directed lobes.
- The single corymb-type inflorescence, with the first flowers to open appearing at the edges, has a peduncle up to 15 cm (6 in) long.
- Flowers are small for the genus, becoming only about 6.5 mm (1/4 in) across, with the flower's "faces" directed upward. The sepals are fused for about ¼ of their length, curved egg-shape, and up to about 3.3 mm (1/8 in) long. Slender petals curve backwards and are up to 2.4 mm (3/32 in) long. The lip, or labellum, has no stalk, is more or less arrowhead-shaped , and has at its base two conspicuous, backward-directed "ears", or "basal auricles", which in their natural position approach each other and often overlap behind the column (fused male and female parts). Between the ears' bases there are 2 "pollinaria", each composed of 2 fused pollinia and a shiny, wet-looking, sticky "apical droplet", called a "viscidium", which glues the pollinia to visiting pollinators.
- The capsular-type fruits are ellipsoid, up to 9 mm × 4 mm (3/8 in × 3/16 in) in size, and are held on a very slender pedicel up to 7 mm (1/4 in) long.

== Distribution ==
Malaxis magniauriculata is endemic just to the three Mexican states of Hidalgo, Puebla and Oaxaca.

== Habitat ==
Malaxis magniauriculata inhabits oak forests, forests of mixed oak and pine, and forests of mixed pine and juniper, at elevations of 2,350–2,630 m (7,710–8,630 ft). Images on this page show a flowering individual growing on the mossy wall of a roadcut in a forest of pine and junipers, on limestone bedrock, at an elevation of about 2,300 meters (~7,550 feet).

== Phenology ==
Malaxis magniauriculata flowers and fruits from July to September.

== Conservation status ==
Having been recognized only in 2024, as of 2026 Malaxis magniauriculata was not listed on the IUCN Red List. However, in Mexico a study listed it as threatened, "amenazada", because of its limited area of distribution. This was in agreement with the designation as defined in the Mexican Goverment's Norma Oficial Mexicana NOM-059-SEMARNAT-2010.

== Symbiotic relationship ==
All orchid species produce large numbers of dust-like seeds containing only very small amounts of stored nutrients. These seeds must be colonized by mycorrhizal fungi which enter into a symbiotic relationship between the orchid and the fungus, called myco-heterotrophy. The fungi provide the seeds nutrients needed to provision the formation of non-photosynthetic structures known as "protocorms", from which later the regular corms and above-ground parts emerge.

With regard to the flower's shiny, wet-looking, sticky "apical droplet" or viscidium, which glues the pollinia to visiting pollinators, in another Malaxis species with very small, greenish flowers, the wet-looking droplets have been found to attract small Diptera such as mosquitoes and gnats, and to contain chemical compounds creating scent bouquets smelling of flowers and mushrooms. Certain of these compounds displayed molecular structures similar to pheromones involved in reproductive behavior. These observations suggest that the shiny droplets may have been attracting pollinators by signaling the possibility of food and/or mating opportunities, while possibly offering nothing in return -- attraction of pollinators by deception.

== Taxonomy ==
In 2024, the Mexicans Gerardo A. Salazar, Rolando Jiménez-Machorro and Miguel Castañeda-Zárate formally described and named Malaxis magniauriculata. They noted that the new species was most similar to Malaxis realdelmontensis, except for features of its labellum's basal auricles.

In earlier literature and some databases today, plants of Malaxis magniauriculata and Malaxis realdelmontensis have gone unnoticed among what often was considered to be Malaxis brachystachys, said to be distributed from southern Arizona through Mexico. In 2026, Malaxis brachystachys was treated as a synonym of Malaxis realdelmontensis, which has a small distribution area in Mexico. Earlier documentation of Malaxis brachystachys in Arizona and northwestern Mexico apparently was what in 2026 was Malaxis corymbosa.

=== Phylogeny ===
Malaxis magniauriculata is part of a distinctive group of species distributed from the southern USA to El Salvador in Central America, with its center of diversity in Mexico. These species are characterized by their single leaves, inflorescences which are flat-topped or slightly rounded with the lower flower stalks longer than the upper ones, and labella which are somewhat triangular. This group includes Malaxis realdelmontensis, Malaxis corymbosa and several other species published in the last three decades, such as Malaxis alvaroi, Malaxis chica, Malaxis espejoi, Malaxis rositae, Malaxis tequilensis and Malaxis triangularis.

=== Etymology ===
The genus name Malaxis derives from the Greek malaxis, meaning "softening", referring to the soft and tender texture of leaves of the species.

The species name magniauriculata is constructed of magni-, a combining form appearing in loanwords from Latin, meaning "large, great", and the Latin auriculatus, meaning "shaped like an ear". Thus "big ears", referring to the prominent lobes or "ears" at the labellum's base, which is the most distinctive feature of this species.
