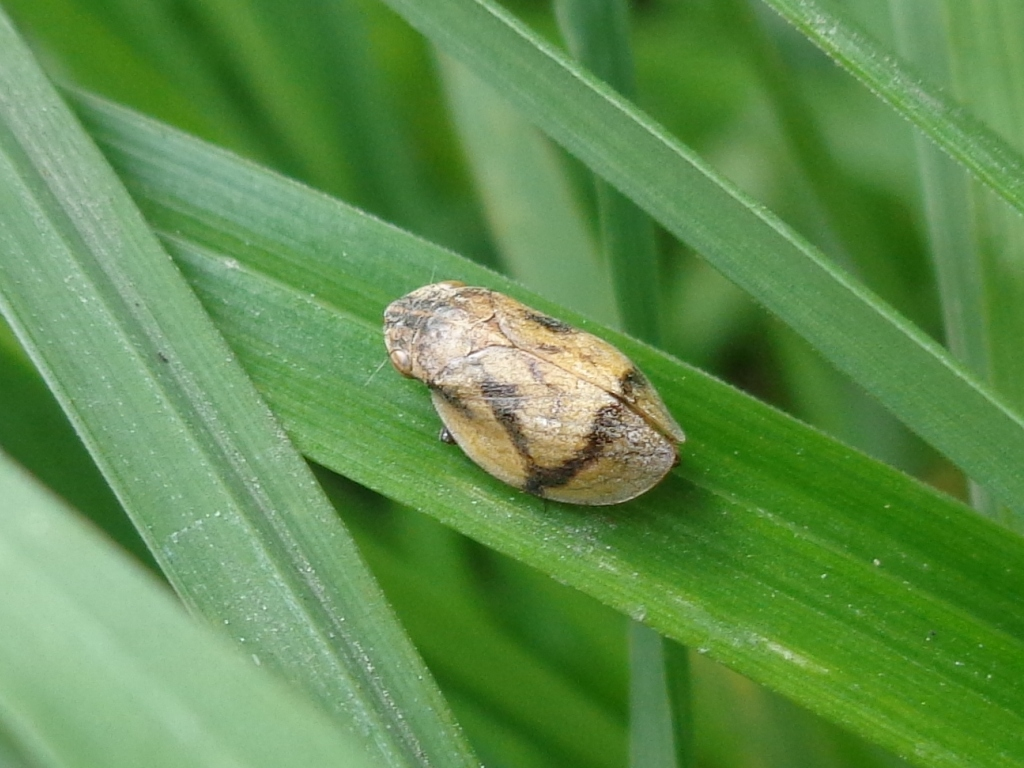

Scientific classification
- Kingdom: Animalia
- Phylum: Arthropoda
- Class: Insecta
- Order: Hemiptera
- Suborder: Auchenorrhyncha
- Family: Aphrophoridae
- Genus: Lepyronia
- Species: L. coleoptrata

Binomial name
- Lepyronia coleoptrata (Linnaeus, 1758)

= Lepyronia coleoptrata =

Species of true bug

Lepyronia coleoptrata is a species of spittlebug in the Aphrophoridae family. Native to Europe and Asia, this species has been introduced to northeast North America.

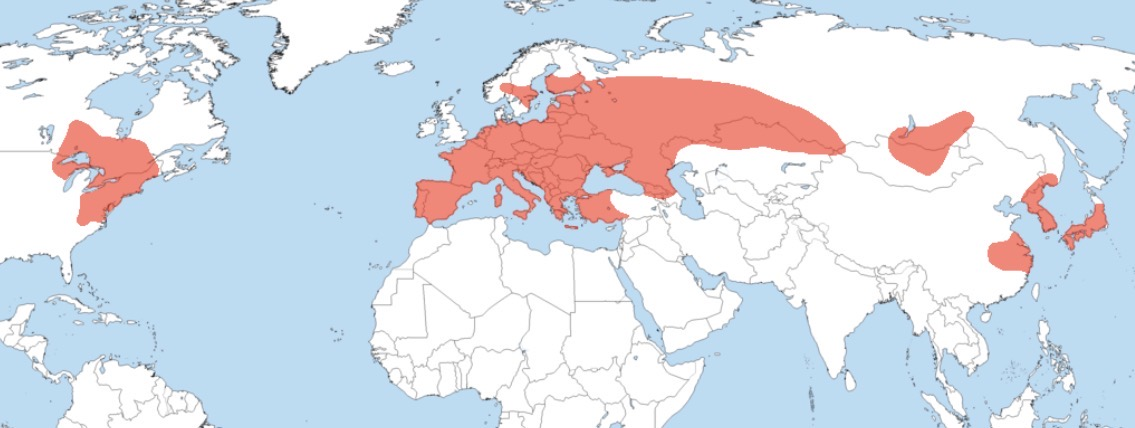
Lepyronia coleoptrata Habitat Map

== Description and ecology ==
Imago measuring 5.1-7.8 mm, pale brown with dark membranes on the front wings. Egg 1.6-0.4 mm, oblong, somewhat curved, flattened from dorsal and convex on ventral sides. The larva is 5.7-6.7 mm, at the older age there are distinct dark spots on the body. Hibernate eggs under the bark of perennial shoots. Larvae revive late April - first half of May. Populate annual (55-96%) and perennial (40-45%) lavender shoots, concentrated mainly at a height of up to 20 cm from the soil surface. They feed by forming a foam around themselves, which is a secretory fluid. In places of damage, the shoot tissue dries up and cracks, which prevents water and nutrients from accessing the plant parts above. Strongly damaged shoots lag behind in growth and development, thin out, acquire a light coloration, the part wavily bends and does not dissolve. The mass of the inflorescences decreases by 12-67%.

== Reproduction ==
The wingworms spread in the second half of June. After the flight, they are found not only on lavender, but also on crops of other crops, in forest belts, along the edges of fields, in wastelands with various grass vegetation. They feed on leaves, which causes the formation of spots, yellowish spots. Full sexual maturity is reached in August - September. Females lay eggs that remain for the winter. One generation per year develops.
