= Malaxis novogaliciana =

Scientific classification
- Kingdom: Plantae
- Clade: Embryophytes
- Clade: Tracheophytes
- Clade: Spermatophytes
- Clade: Angiosperms
- Clade: Monocots
- Order: Asparagales
- Family: Orchidaceae
- Subfamily: Epidendroideae
- Genus: Malaxis
- Species: M. novogaliciana

Binomial name
- Malaxis novogaliciana R.González ex McVaugh 1985

Species of orchid

Malaxis novogaliciana is a species of orchid native to northwestern Mexico. It has been found in Chihuahua, Durango, Sinaloa, Jalisco, Zacatecas, Aguascalientes, and Nayarit.
