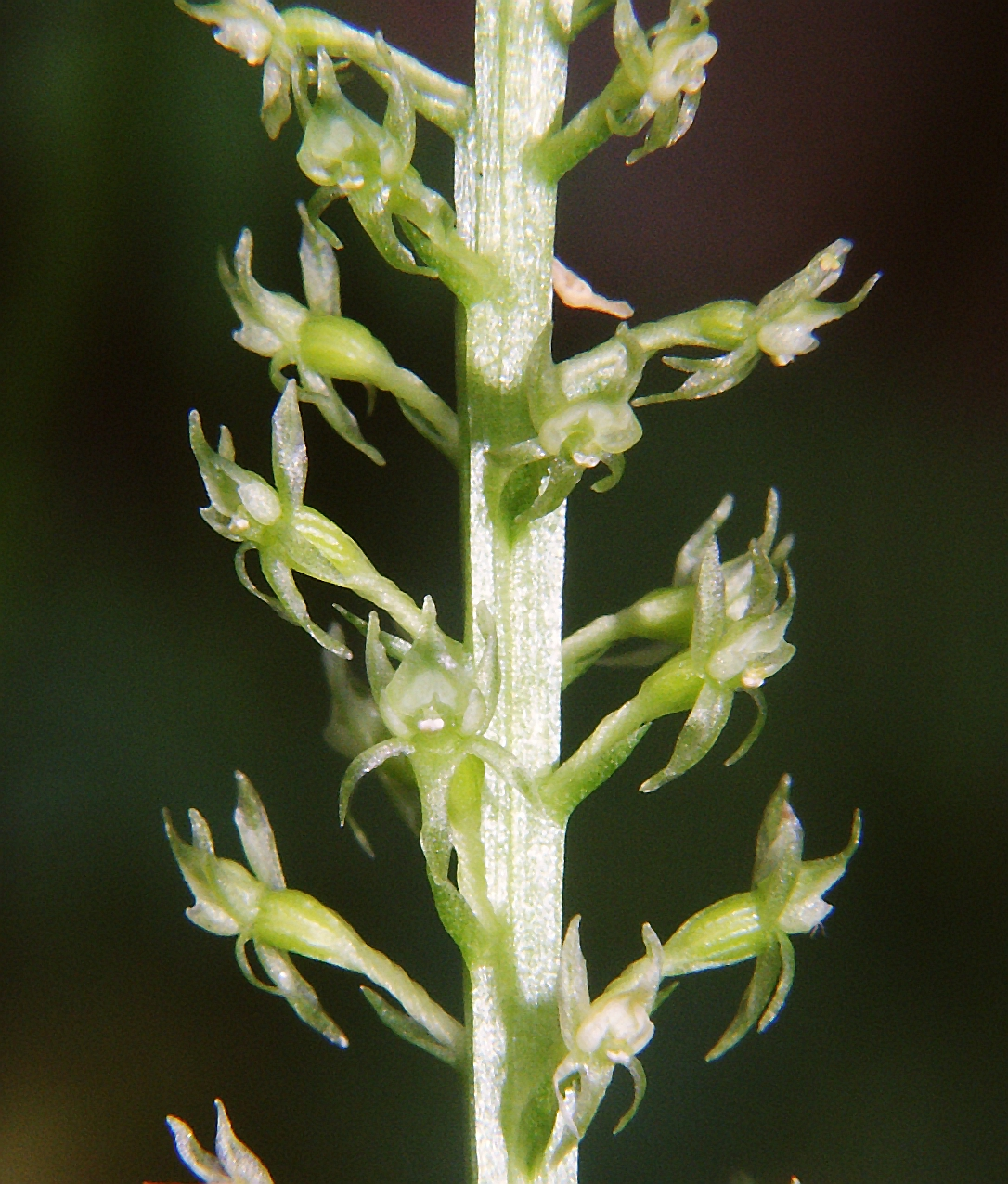
- Malaxis monophyllos

Scientific classification
- Kingdom: Plantae
- Clade: Tracheophytes
- Clade: Angiosperms
- Clade: Monocots
- Order: Asparagales
- Family: Orchidaceae
- Subfamily: Epidendroideae
- Tribe: Malaxideae
- Subtribe: Malaxidinae
- Genus: Malaxis; Sol. ex Sw. 1788

Synonyms
- Achroanthes Raf.; Acroanthes Raf.; Cheiropterocephalus Barb. Rodr.; Dienia Lindl.; Hammarbya Kuntze; Microstylis (Nutt.) Eaton; Pedilea Lindl.; Pseudoliparis Finet

= Malaxis =

Genus of orchids

Malaxis, commonly called adder's mouth, is a genus of terrestrial and semiepiphytic orchids. The generic name signifies "smooth" and alludes to the tender texture of the leaves. There are approximately 182 species, found mostly in tropics but with some species in temperate regions.

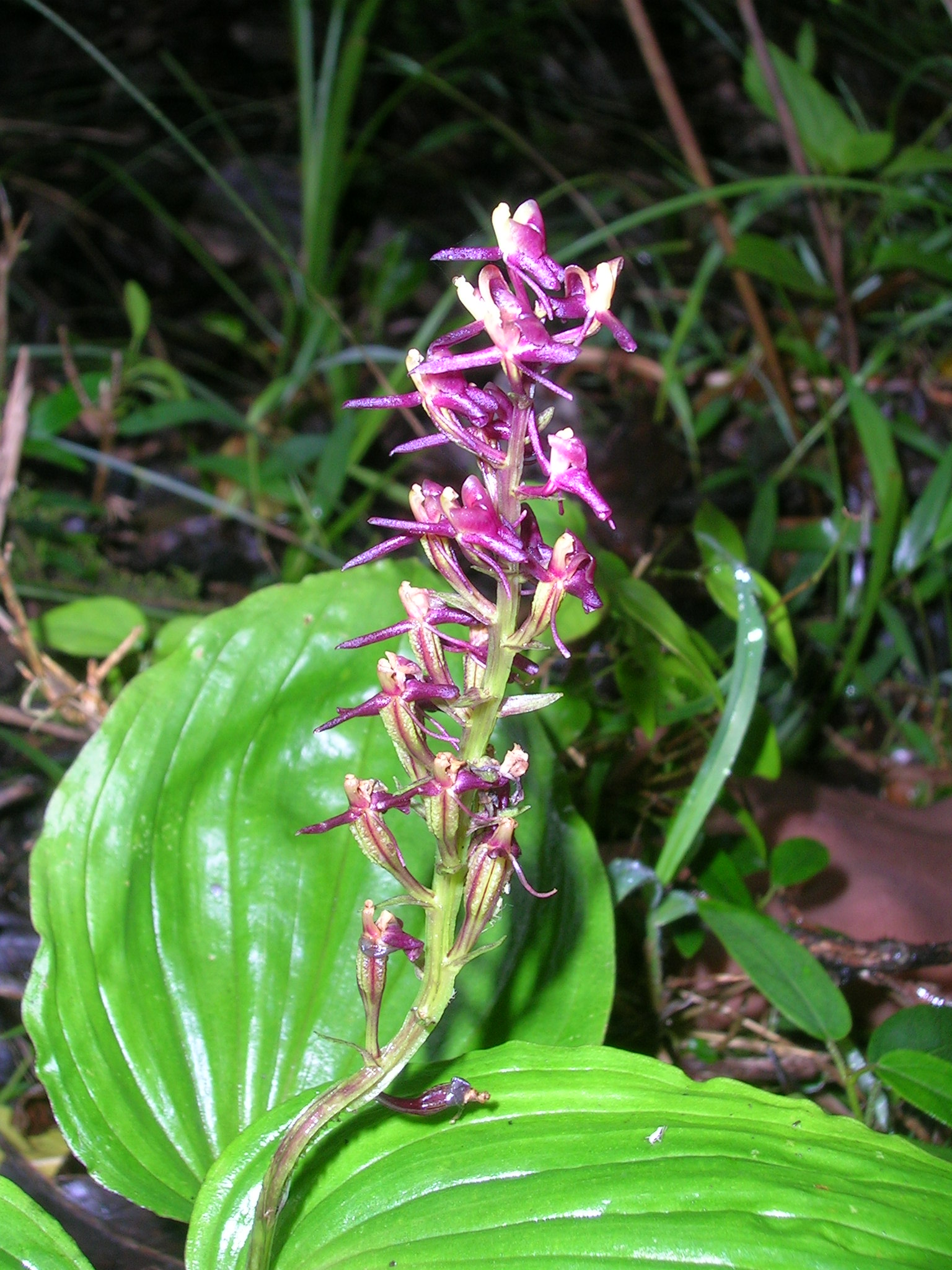
Malaxis densiflora from India

Species

- Malaxis abieticola
- Malaxis acianthoides
- Malaxis adenotropa
- Malaxis adolphii
- Malaxis alamaganensis
- Malaxis alvaroi
- Malaxis amabilis
- Malaxis andersoniana
- Malaxis andersonii
- Malaxis andicola
- Malaxis apiculata
- Malaxis arboricola
- Malaxis aurea
- Malaxis auriculata
- Malaxis bayardii
- Malaxis boliviana
- Malaxis boninensis
- Malaxis brachyrrhynchos
- Malaxis brachystachys
- Malaxis brevis
- Malaxis buchtienii
- Malaxis bulusanensis
- Malaxis calcicola
- Malaxis cardiophylla
- Malaxis carnosa
- Malaxis casillasii
- Malaxis chamaeorchis
- Malaxis chevalieri
- Malaxis chiarae
- Malaxis chica
- Malaxis cipoensis
- Malaxis cogniauxiana
- Malaxis contrerasii
- Malaxis crassidens
- Malaxis crassilabris
- Malaxis crispata
- Malaxis crispifolia
- Malaxis cumbensis
- Malaxis densiflora
- Malaxis discolor
- Malaxis domingensis
- Malaxis ehrenbergii
- Malaxis elegans
- Malaxis elviae
- Malaxis espejoi
- Malaxis excavata
- Malaxis fastigiata
- Malaxis greenwoodiana
- Malaxis hagsateri
- Malaxis hahajimensis
- Malaxis hieronymi
- Malaxis hintonii
- Malaxis hispaniolae
- Malaxis histionantha
- Malaxis hoi
- Malaxis hoppii
- Malaxis horielensis
- Malaxis incurviforceps
- Malaxis insperata
- Malaxis intermedia
- Malaxis iwashinae
- Malaxis jaraguae
- Malaxis javesiae
- Malaxis johniana
- Malaxis katangensis
- Malaxis keysseri
- Malaxis labrosa
- Malaxis laciniosa
- Malaxis lagotis
- Malaxis leonardii
- Malaxis lepanthiflora
- Malaxis lepidota
- Malaxis licatae
- Malaxis lizbethiae
- Malaxis lobulata
- Malaxis lombasangensis
- Malaxis longipedunculata
- Malaxis loxia
- Malaxis luceroana
- Malaxis lyonnetii
- Malaxis maclaudii
- Malaxis macrostachya
- Malaxis maculata
- Malaxis macvaughiana
- Malaxis madagascariensis
- Malaxis magniauriculata
- Malaxis maianthemifolia
- Malaxis major
- Malaxis mambulilingensis
- Malaxis marthaleidae
- Malaxis martinezii
- Malaxis massonii
- Malaxis maxonii
- Malaxis medinae
- Malaxis melanotoessa
- Malaxis micheliana
- Malaxis micholitziana
- Malaxis mixta
- Malaxis molotensis
- Malaxis moluccana
- Malaxis monophyllos
- Malaxis monsviridis
- Malaxis moritzii
- Malaxis mucronulata
- Malaxis muscifera
- Malaxis myurus
- Malaxis nana
- Malaxis nelsonii
- Malaxis nidiae
- Malaxis novogaliciana
- Malaxis ochreata
- Malaxis pabstii
- Malaxis padilliana
- Malaxis pandurata
- Malaxis parthoni
- Malaxis perezii
- Malaxis physuroides
- Malaxis pittieri
- Malaxis pollardii
- Malaxis porphyrea
- Malaxis pringlei
- Malaxis prorepens
- Malaxis pubescens
- Malaxis purpureoviridis
- Malaxis pusilla
- Malaxis quadrata
- Malaxis ramirezii
- Malaxis reichei
- Malaxis reichenbachiana
- Malaxis ribana
- Malaxis robinsonii
- Malaxis roblesgiliana
- Malaxis rodrigueziana
- Malaxis rosei
- Malaxis rosilloi
- Malaxis rositae
- Malaxis rostratula
- Malaxis ruizii
- Malaxis rupestris
- Malaxis rzedowskiana
- Malaxis salazarii
- Malaxis sampoae
- Malaxis schliebenii
- Malaxis seramica
- Malaxis seychellarum
- Malaxis simillima
- Malaxis slamatensis
- Malaxis sneidernii
- Malaxis sodiroi
- Malaxis spicata
- Malaxis steyermarkii
- Malaxis streptopetala
- Malaxis sulamadahensis
- Malaxis talamancana
- Malaxis talaudensis
- Malaxis tamayoana
- Malaxis tamurensis
- Malaxis tepicana
- Malaxis tequilensis
- Malaxis termensis
- Malaxis ternatensis
- Malaxis thienii
- Malaxis thwaitesii
- Malaxis tonduzii
- Malaxis toxopei
- Malaxis triangularis
- Malaxis tridentula
- Malaxis trigonopetala
- Malaxis triphylla
- Malaxis trukensis
- Malaxis umbelliflora
- Malaxis unifolia
- Malaxis urbana
- Malaxis ventilabrum
- Malaxis ventricosa
- Malaxis versicolor
- Malaxis warmingii
- Malaxis weddellii
- Malaxis wendlandii
- Malaxis wendtii
- Malaxis wercklei
- Malaxis woodsonii
- Malaxis xerophila
- Malaxis yanganensis
- Malaxis zempoalensis
