= Psyche rassei =

Scientific classification
- Kingdom: Animalia
- Phylum: Arthropoda
- Class: Insecta
- Order: Lepidoptera
- Family: Psychidae
- Genus: Psyche
- Species: P. rassei

Binomial name
- Psyche rassei (Sieder, 1975)

Synonyms
- Masonia rassei Sieder, 1975

Species of moth

Psyche rassei is a moth of the Psychidae family. It was described by Sieder in 1975. It is found in Turkey.
