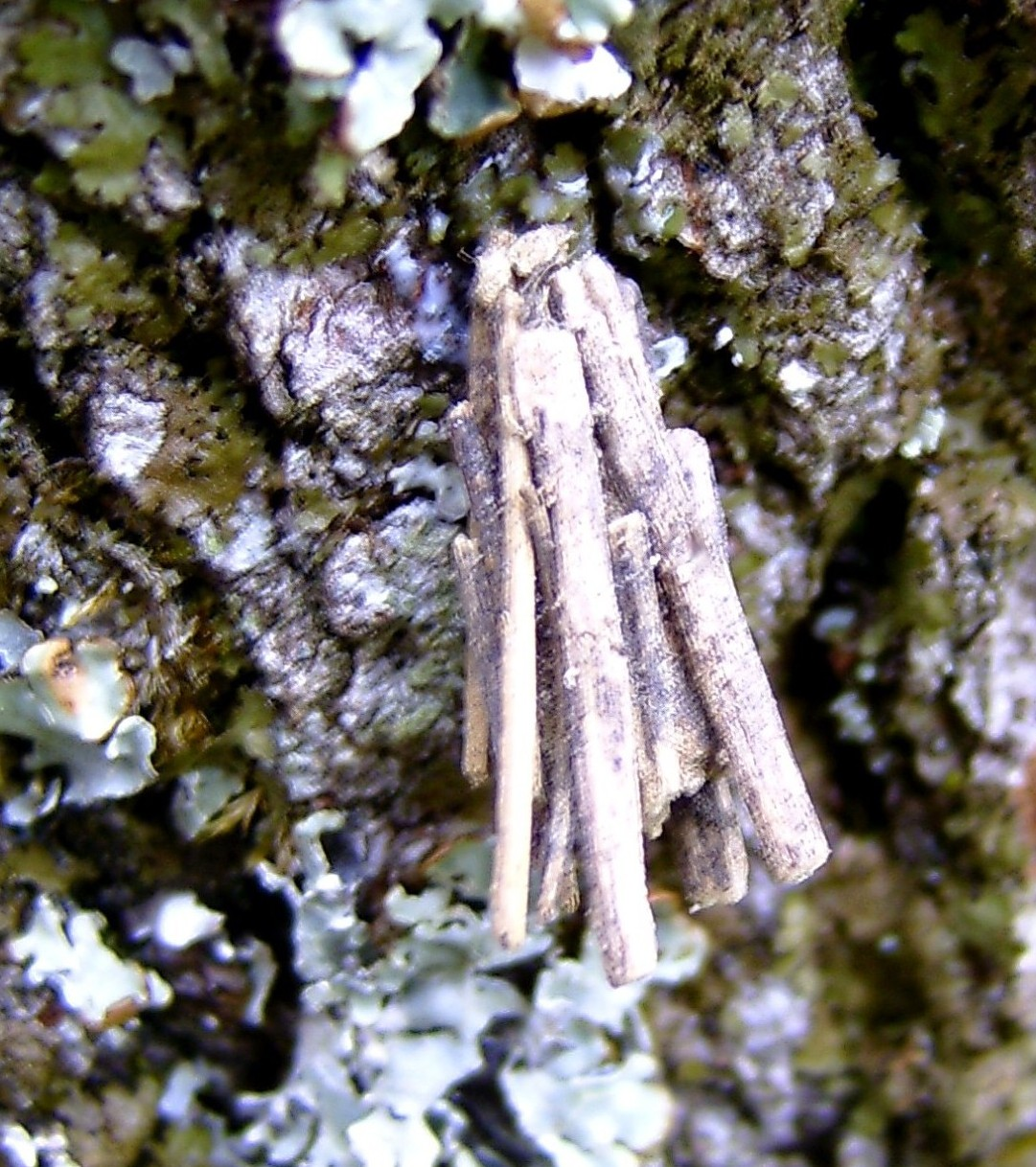
- Psyche crassiorella case

Scientific classification
- Kingdom: Animalia
- Phylum: Arthropoda
- Clade: Pancrustacea
- Class: Insecta
- Order: Lepidoptera
- Family: Psychidae
- Genus: Psyche
- Species: P. crassiorella

Binomial name
- Psyche crassiorella (Bruand, 1851)

Synonyms
- Fumea crassiorella Bruand, 1851

= Psyche crassiorella =

Species of moth

Psyche crassiorella is a moth of the Psychidae family. It is found from the coasts of the Mediterranean Sea, through the temperate areas of Europe, to England and north to central Fennoscandia. In the Alps it is found up to heights of 1,200 meters.

== Description ==
There is strong sexual dimorphism in the adults. Males have wings with a wingspan of 14–16 mm, but females are wingless. In the male the forewings are rather broad, the apex tolerably obtuse; dark fuscous, purplish-tinged. Hindwings rather dark fuscous. Female with anal tuft grey-whitish. Larva light purplish-brown; subdorsal and spiracular lines on 2-4 reddish, head light brown, blackish-marked : case covered with longitudinally placed fragments of grass; on grass, etc.

== Biology ==
Adults are on wing from May to July. There is one generation per year.

The larvae feed on various grasses, Bryophyte and Chlorophyta species and lichen as well as Geranium sanguineum.

The female moth rests with the body strongly bent under, so that the ovipositor is directed forwards.
