= Malaxis macrostachya =

Scientific classification
- Kingdom: Plantae
- Clade: Tracheophytes
- Clade: Angiosperms
- Clade: Monocots
- Order: Asparagales
- Family: Orchidaceae
- Subfamily: Epidendroideae
- Genus: Malaxis
- Species: M. macrostachya

Binomial name
- Malaxis macrostachya (La Llave & Lex.) Kuntze 1891

Synonyms
- List: Ophrys macrostachya La Llave & Lex. 1825; Microstylis macrostachya (La Llave & Lex.) Lindl.; Achroanthes montana (Engelm. ex Rothr.) Greene; Malaxis densiflora A.Rich. & Galeotti ex Ridl. 1888, not validly published, not (A. Rich.) Kuntze 1891; Malaxis montana (Engelm. ex Rothr.) Kuntze 1891 not Blume 1826; Malaxis soulei L.O.Williams; Microstylis montana Engelm. ex Rothr.

Species of orchid

Malaxis macrostachya is a species of orchid widespread across much Mexico, Central America, and the southwestern United States (Arizona, New Mexico, western Texas). It has only one leaf per plant, along with a tall flower stalk with as many as 160 tiny, green flowers.
