= Malaxis porphyrea =

Scientific classification
- Kingdom: Plantae
- Clade: Tracheophytes
- Clade: Angiosperms
- Clade: Monocots
- Order: Asparagales
- Family: Orchidaceae
- Subfamily: Epidendroideae
- Genus: Malaxis
- Species: M. porphyrea

Binomial name
- Malaxis porphyrea (Ridl.) Kuntze 1891

Synonyms
- List: Microstylis purpurea S.Watson 1883, illegitimate homonym not Lindl. 1830; Microstylis porphyrea Ridl. 1888; Achroanthes porphyrea (Ridl.) Wooton & Standl.; Achroanthes purpurea Greene

Species of orchid

Malaxis porphyrea, the Cochise adder's-mouth orchid, is a species of orchid native to northern Mexico (Sonora, Chihuahua) and the southwestern United States (Arizona, New Mexico). It is an herb up to 45 cm (18 in) tall with only one leaf below tiny purple flowers in an elongated cluster.
