= Malaxis wendtii =

Conservation status
- Near Threatened (IUCN 3.1)

Scientific classification
- Kingdom: Plantae
- Clade: Embryophytes
- Clade: Tracheophytes
- Clade: Spermatophytes
- Clade: Angiosperms
- Clade: Monocots
- Order: Asparagales
- Family: Orchidaceae
- Subfamily: Epidendroideae
- Genus: Malaxis
- Species: M. wendtii

Binomial name
- Malaxis wendtii Salazar 1993

Synonyms
- Tamayorkis wendtii (Salazar) R.González & Szlach. 1998

Species of orchid

Malaxis wendtii, the Wendt's adder's-mouth orchid, is a North American species of orchids native to northern Mexico (Querétaro, Nuevo León, Coahuila) and the US State of Texas.

Malaxis wendtii is an herb up to 45 cm (18 in) tall. It generally has only one leaf, and above it a long vertical array of small purple flowers.
