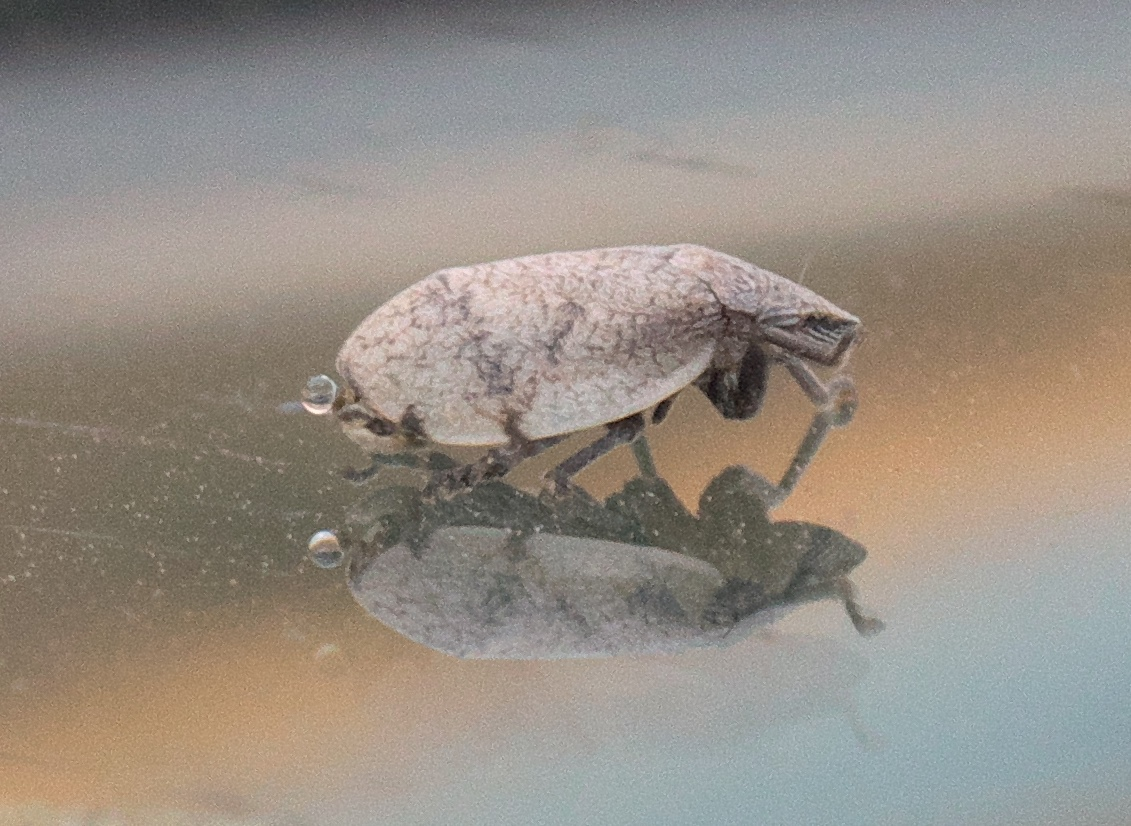

Scientific classification
- Domain: Eukaryota
- Kingdom: Animalia
- Phylum: Arthropoda
- Class: Insecta
- Order: Hemiptera
- Suborder: Auchenorrhyncha
- Family: Aphrophoridae
- Genus: Lepyronia
- Species: L. gibbosa

Binomial name
- Lepyronia gibbosa Ball, 1899

= Lepyronia gibbosa =

Species of insect

Lepyronia gibbosa, known generally as the hill-prairie spittlebug or great plains spittlebug, is a species of spittlebug in the family Aphrophoridae. It is found in North America.

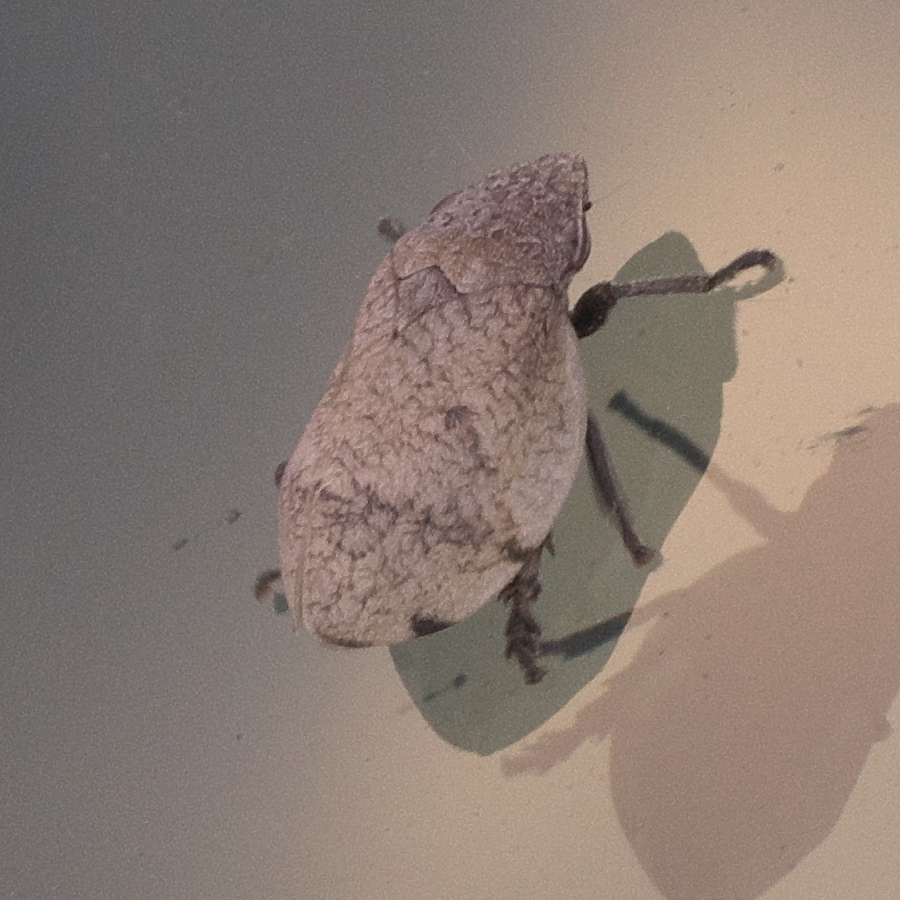
Hill-prairie spittlebug, Lepyronia gibbosa

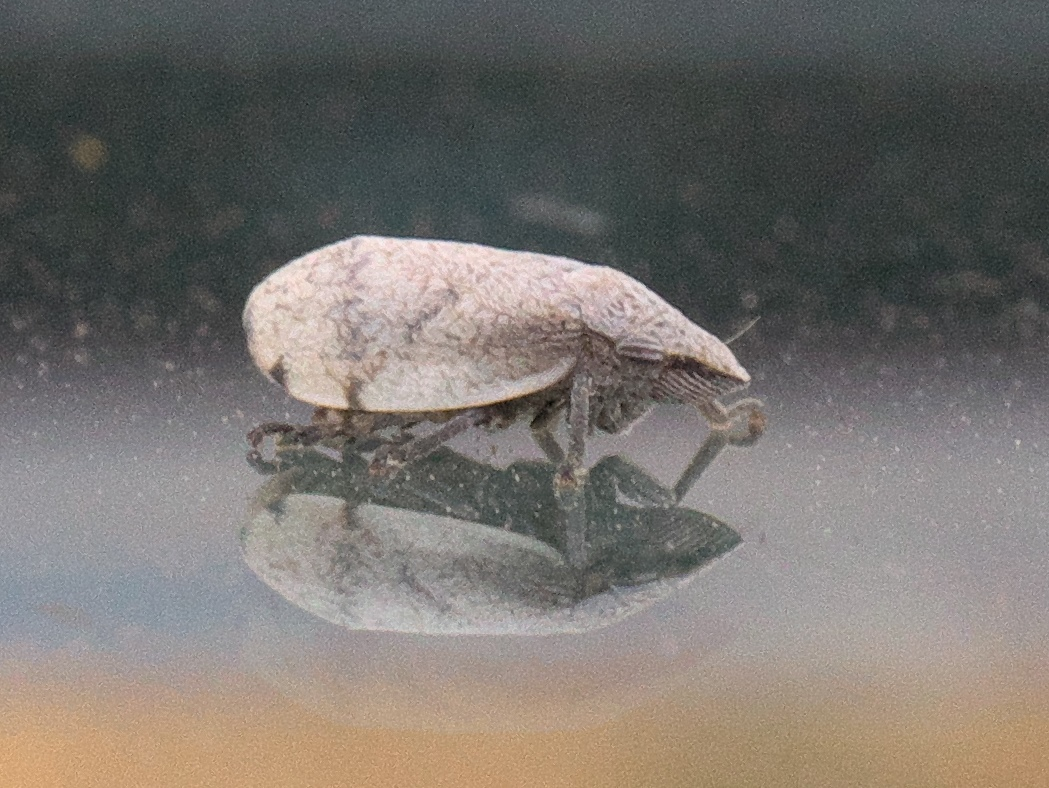
Hill-prairie spittlebug, Lepyronia gibbosa
