= Malaxis sampoae =

Scientific classification
- Kingdom: Plantae
- Clade: Tracheophytes
- Clade: Angiosperms
- Clade: Monocots
- Order: Asparagales
- Family: Orchidaceae
- Subfamily: Epidendroideae
- Genus: Malaxis
- Species: M. sampoae

Binomial name
- Malaxis sampoae T.P. Lin & W.M. Lin 2011

Species of orchid

Malaxis sampoae is an Asian species of orchids. It has been found only in Taiwan.
