= Malaxis abieticola =

Scientific classification
- Kingdom: Plantae
- Clade: Tracheophytes
- Clade: Angiosperms
- Clade: Monocots
- Order: Asparagales
- Family: Orchidaceae
- Subfamily: Epidendroideae
- Genus: Malaxis
- Species: M. abieticola

Binomial name
- Malaxis abieticola Salazar & Soto Arenas 2001

Synonyms
- Microstylis tenuis S. Watson 1891; Malaxis tenuis (S.Watson) Ames 1922, illegitimate homonym not Rchb. f. 1861

Species of orchid

Malaxis abieticola is a species of orchid native to Mexico and to the southwestern United States (Arizona, New Mexico). It has only one leaf underneath several small green flowers growing in an elongated array.
