= Malaxis boninensis =

Scientific classification
- Kingdom: Plantae
- Clade: Tracheophytes
- Clade: Angiosperms
- Clade: Monocots
- Order: Asparagales
- Family: Orchidaceae
- Subfamily: Epidendroideae
- Genus: Malaxis
- Species: M. boninensis

Binomial name
- Malaxis boninensis (Koidz.) K.Nakaj.

Species of orchid

Malaxis boninensis is a species of flowering plants in the family Orchidaceae, native to the Bonin Islands and the Volcano Islands, both belonging to Japan. It grows on the ground from pseudobulbs. It was first described by Gen-ichi Koidzumi in 1918, as Microstylis boninensis, and transferred to Malaxis by Kunio Nakajima in 1975.
