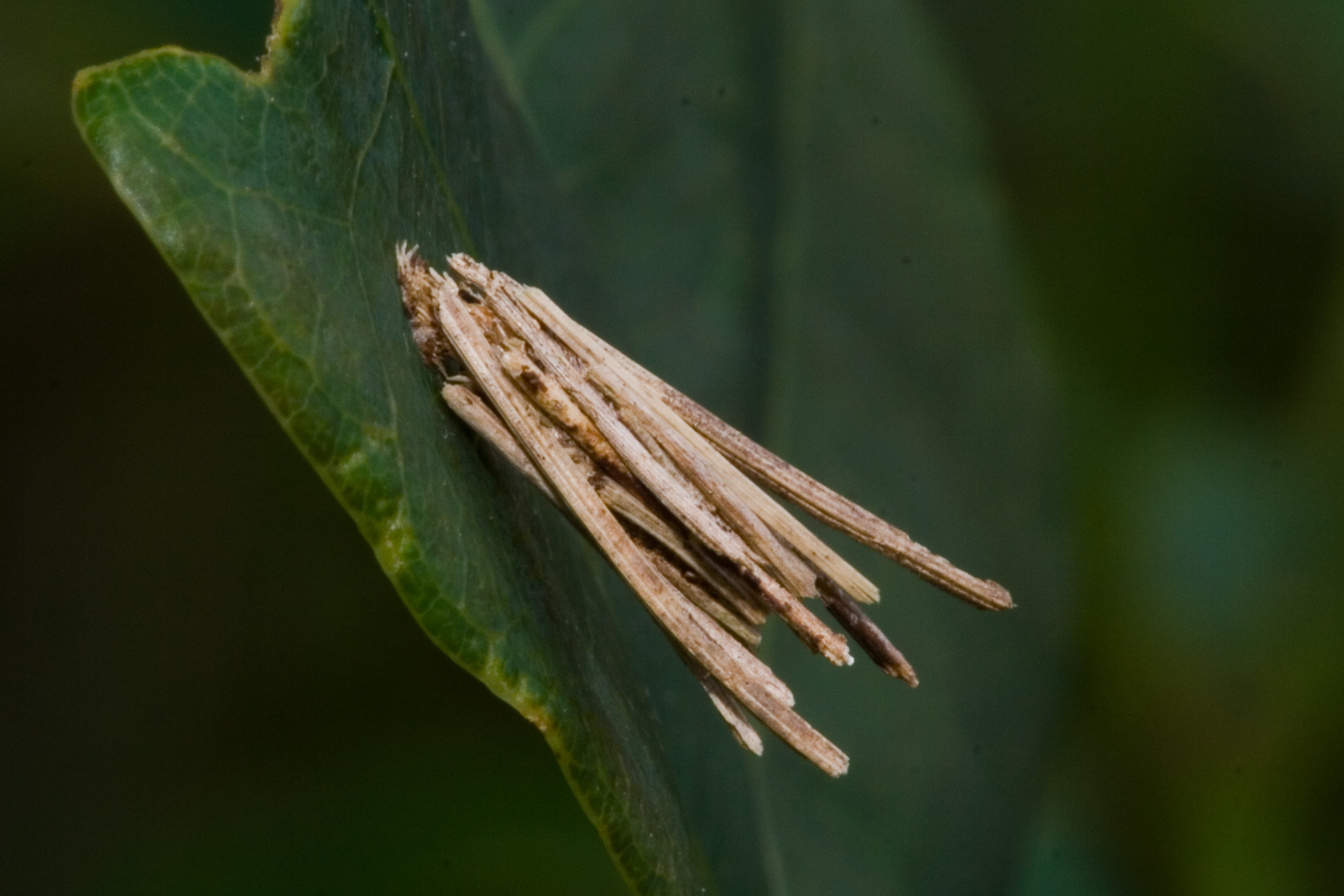

Scientific classification
- Kingdom: Animalia
- Phylum: Arthropoda
- Class: Insecta
- Order: Lepidoptera
- Family: Psychidae
- Genus: Psyche
- Species: P. casta

Binomial name
- Psyche casta (Pallas, 1767)

= Psyche casta =

Species of nocturnal moth

Psyche casta is a nocturnal moth from the family Psychidae, the bagworm moths. The wingspan of the males ranges from 12 to 15 millimeters. They have hairy, brown-metallic shiny wings. The grub-like females have legs but do not have wings and are yellowish or light brown, except for some dark brown back plates.

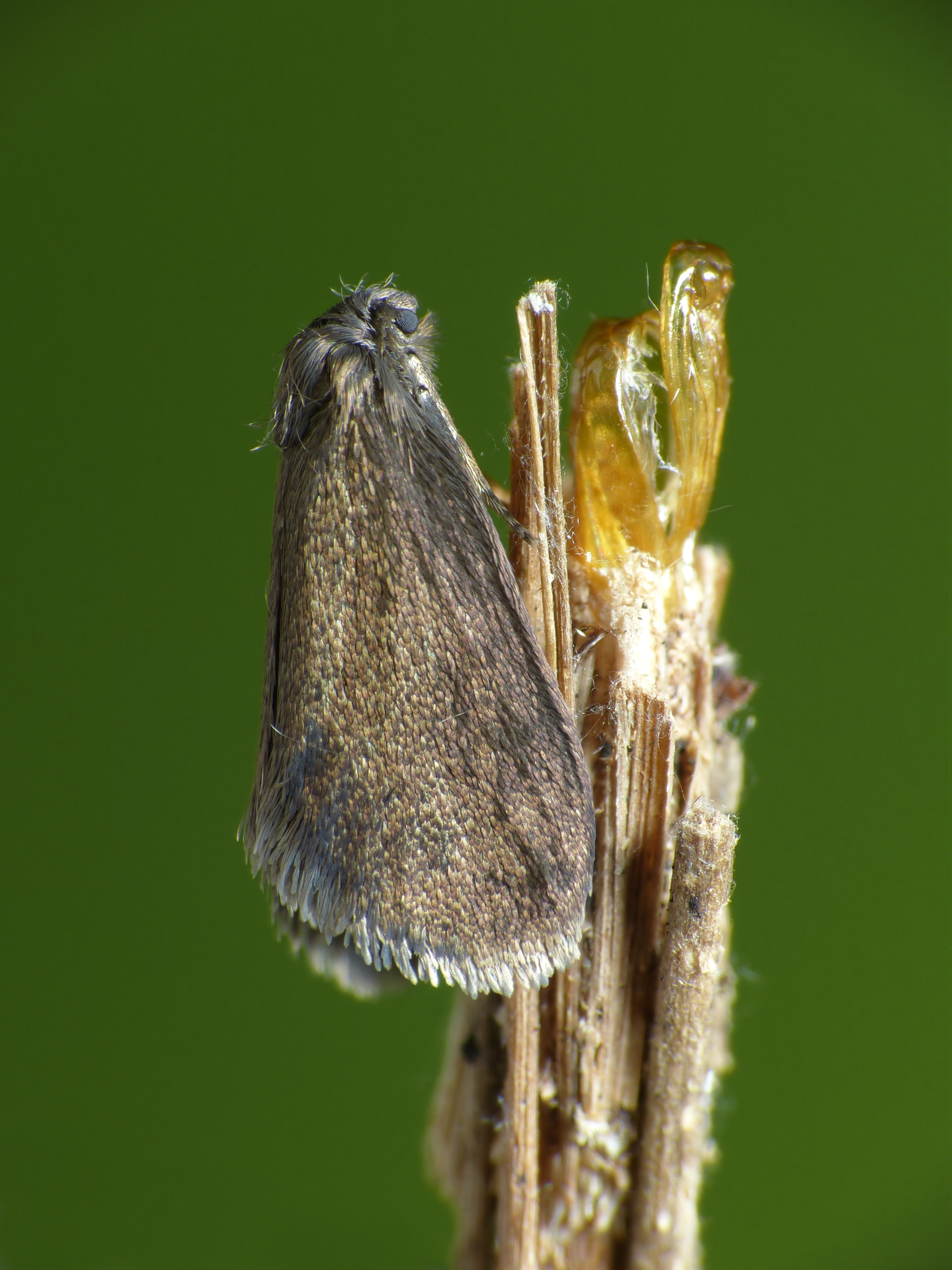
newly emerged male

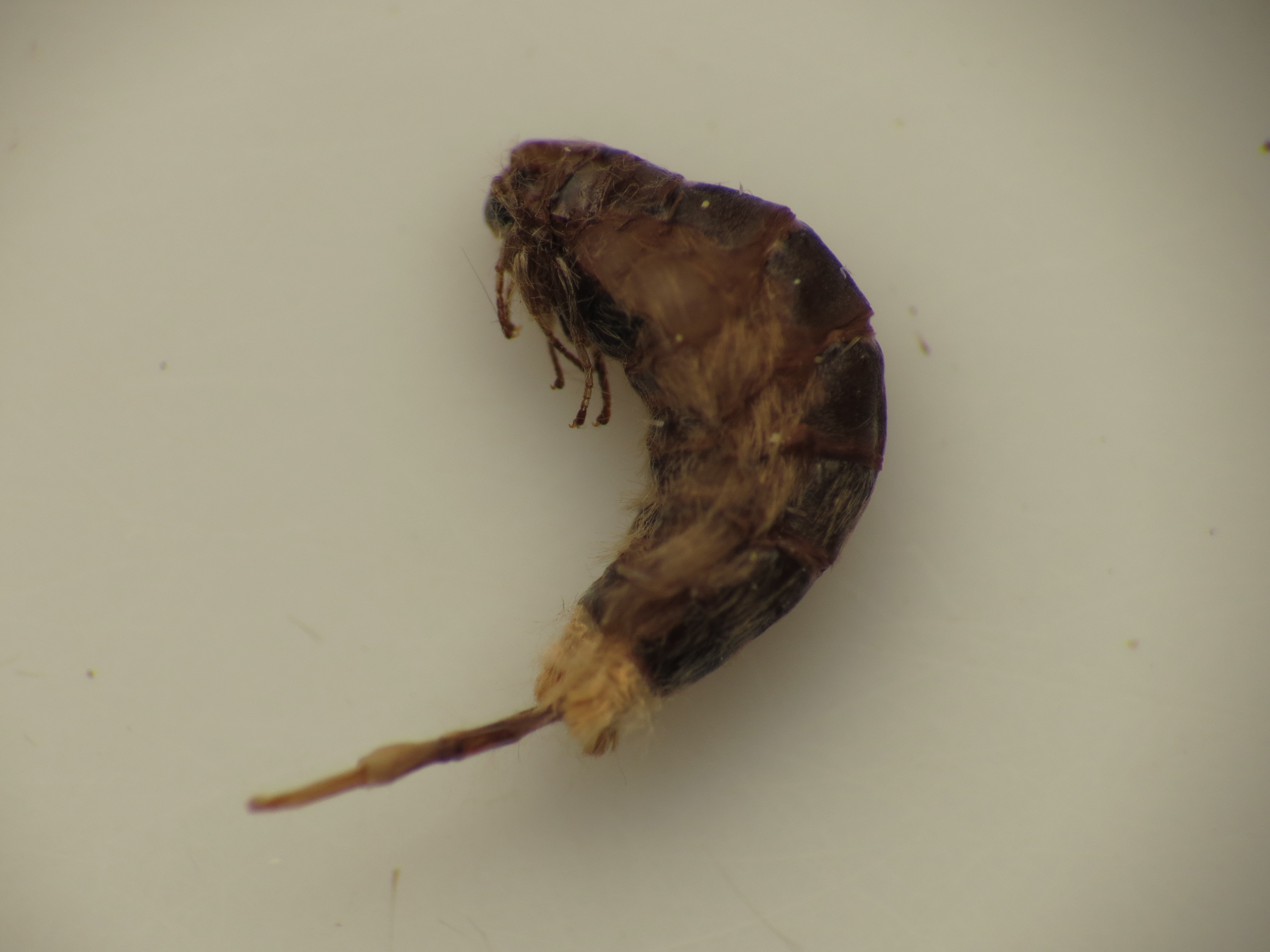
Female

The host plants are from the groups: Poaceae, birch, willow, poplar and Vaccinium. The caterpillars make a protective hull from grass.

The flight time ranges from May to July.

Originally from the Old World, they have been introduced in North America.
