= Malaxis myurus =

Scientific classification
- Kingdom: Plantae
- Clade: Tracheophytes
- Clade: Angiosperms
- Clade: Monocots
- Order: Asparagales
- Family: Orchidaceae
- Subfamily: Epidendroideae
- Genus: Malaxis
- Species: M. myurus

Binomial name
- Malaxis myurus (Lindl.) Kuntze 1891

Synonyms
- Dienia myurus Lindl. 1830; Microstylis myurus (Lindl.) Rchb.f. 1861; Pedilea myurus (Lindl.) Ridl.

Species of orchid

Malaxis myurus is a Mexican species of orchids. It generally has two lance-shaped leaves and an elongated raceme of tiny flowers.
