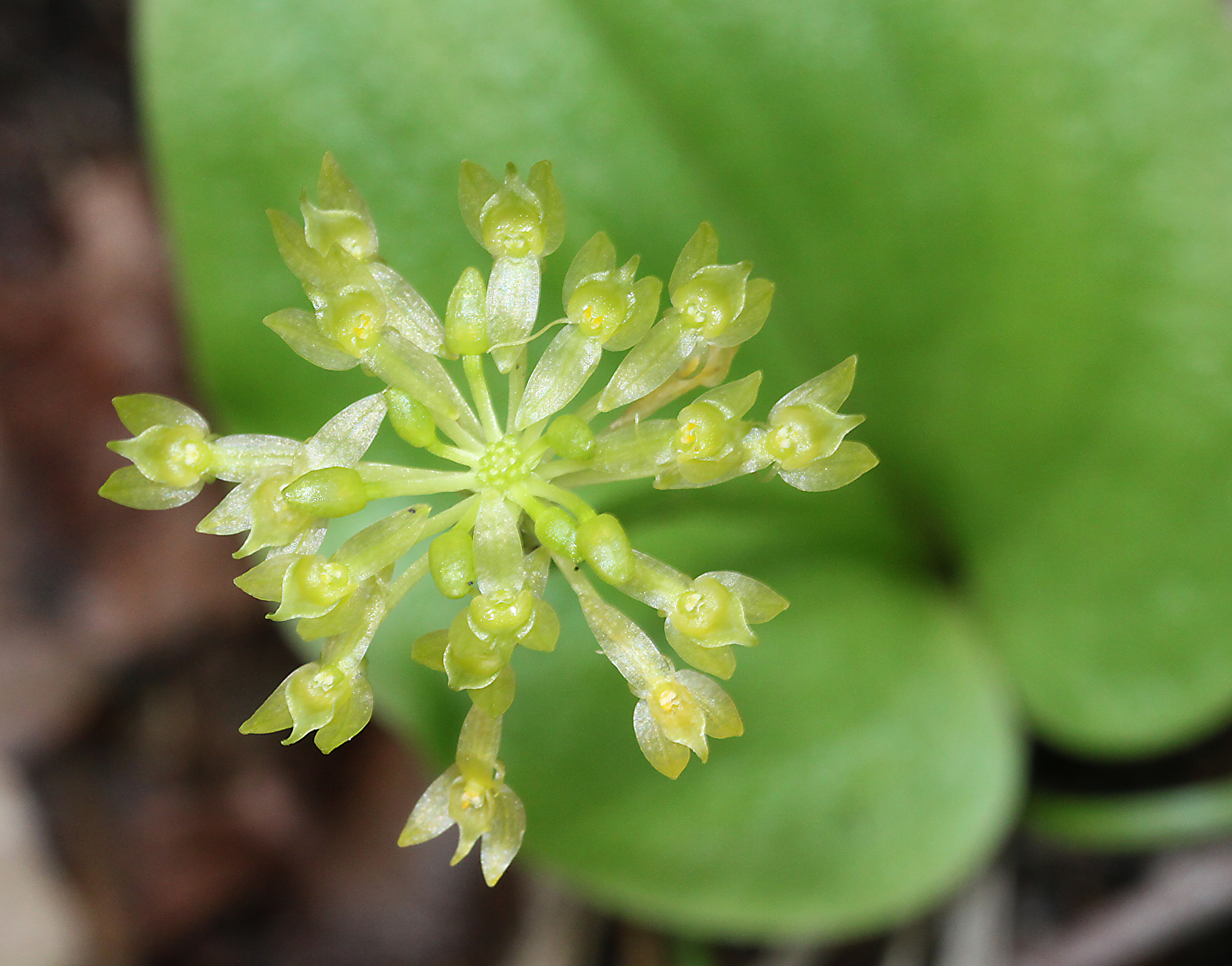

Conservation status
- Least Concern (IUCN 3.1)

Scientific classification
- Kingdom: Plantae
- Clade: Tracheophytes
- Clade: Angiosperms
- Clade: Monocots
- Order: Asparagales
- Family: Orchidaceae
- Subfamily: Epidendroideae
- Genus: Malaxis
- Species: M. brachystachys

Binomial name
- Malaxis brachystachys (Rchb.f.) Kuntze 1891

Synonyms
- List: Microstylis brachystachys Rchb.f. 1849; Microstylis brachystachya Rchb.f.; Malaxis brachystachya (Rchb.f.) Kuntze; Achroanthes corymbosa (S.Watson) Greene; Malaxis corymbosa (S.Watson) Kuntze; Microstylis corymbosa S.Watson 1883

= Malaxis brachystachys =

Species of orchid

Malaxis brachystachys is a North American species of orchid native to Mexico, Central America, and the southwestern United States (Arizona). It usually has only one leaf, though occasionally two. Flowers are small and green, in a flat-topped array.
