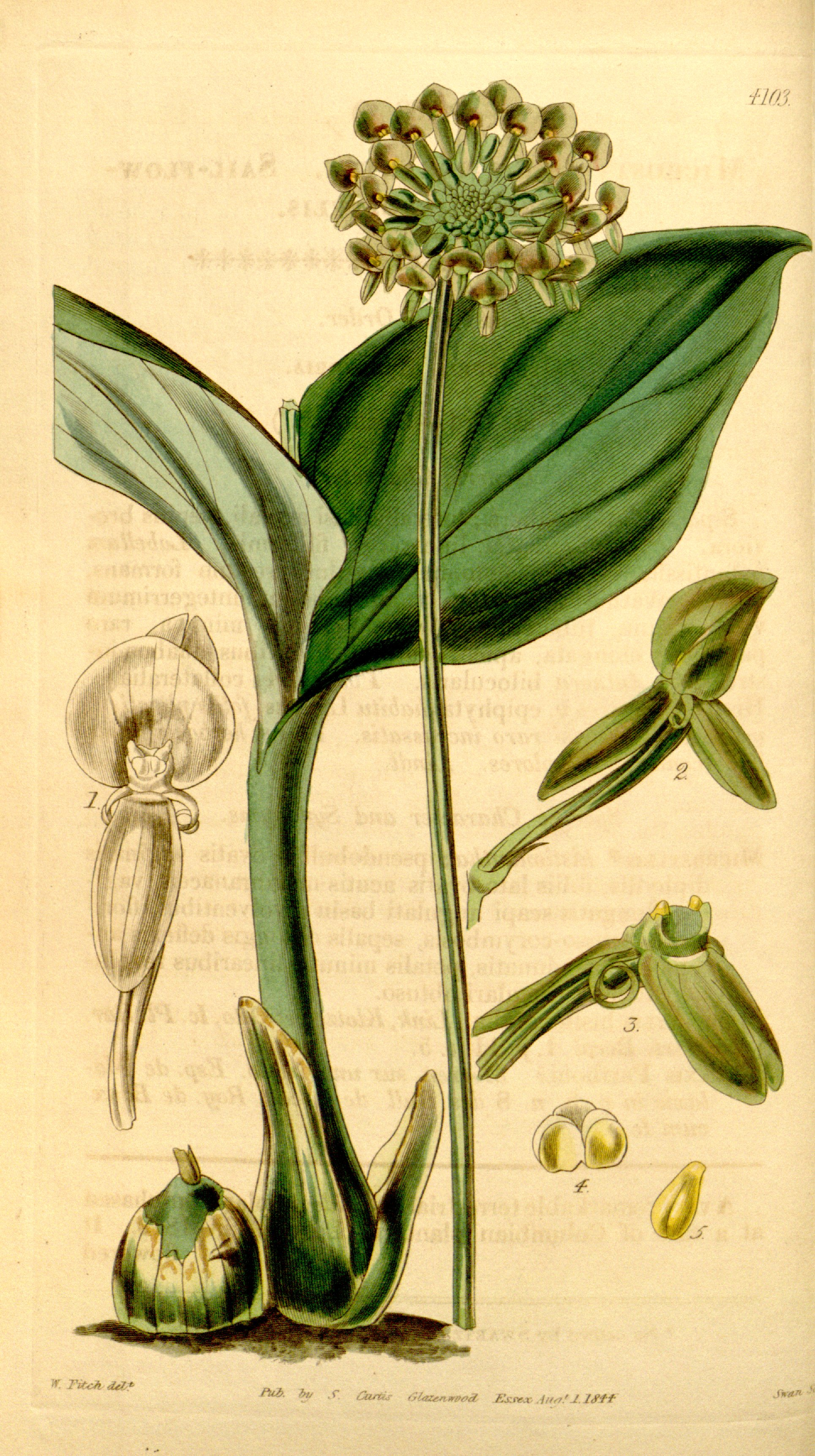
- 1844 illustration

Scientific classification
- Kingdom: Plantae
- Clade: Tracheophytes
- Clade: Angiosperms
- Clade: Monocots
- Order: Asparagales
- Family: Orchidaceae
- Subfamily: Epidendroideae
- Genus: Malaxis
- Species: M. histionantha

Binomial name
- Malaxis histionantha (Link, Klotzsch & Otto) Garay & Dunst. 1976

Synonyms
- Microstylis histionantha Link, Klotzsch & Otto 1840; Microstylis brenesii Schltr.

= Malaxis histionantha =

Species of orchid

Malaxis histionantha is a species of orchid native to Latin America. It is widespread from Mexico to Argentina. It generally has two leaves and a more or less spherical cluster of small green flowers.
