= Malaxis bayardii =

Conservation status
- Critically Endangered (IUCN 3.1)

Scientific classification
- Kingdom: Plantae
- Clade: Tracheophytes
- Clade: Angiosperms
- Clade: Monocots
- Order: Asparagales
- Family: Orchidaceae
- Subfamily: Epidendroideae
- Genus: Malaxis
- Species: M. bayardii

Binomial name
- Malaxis bayardii Fernald

Synonyms
- Malaxis bayardii fo. kelloggiae P.M. Br.

Species of orchid

Malaxis bayardii, or Bayard's adder's-mouth orchid, is a species of orchid native to northeastern North America. It is found from Massachusetts to North Carolina, with isolated populations in Ohio and Nova Scotia. There are historical reports of the plant formerly growing in Vermont and New Jersey, but it seems to have been extirpated in those two states It grows in dry, open woods and pine barrens at elevations of less than 600 m (2000 feet).

Malaxis bayardii is a terrestrial herb up to 26 cm (10.4 inches) tall. It produces a pseudobulb up to 20 mm in diameter. It generally has only one leaf, occasionally two, about halfway up the stem. Flowers are small and green, borne in a raceme of up to 70 flowers.

== Conservation status ==
It is listed as a special concern species and believed extirpated in Connecticut, as rare Massachusetts, and as endangered in New Jersey and in New York (state).
