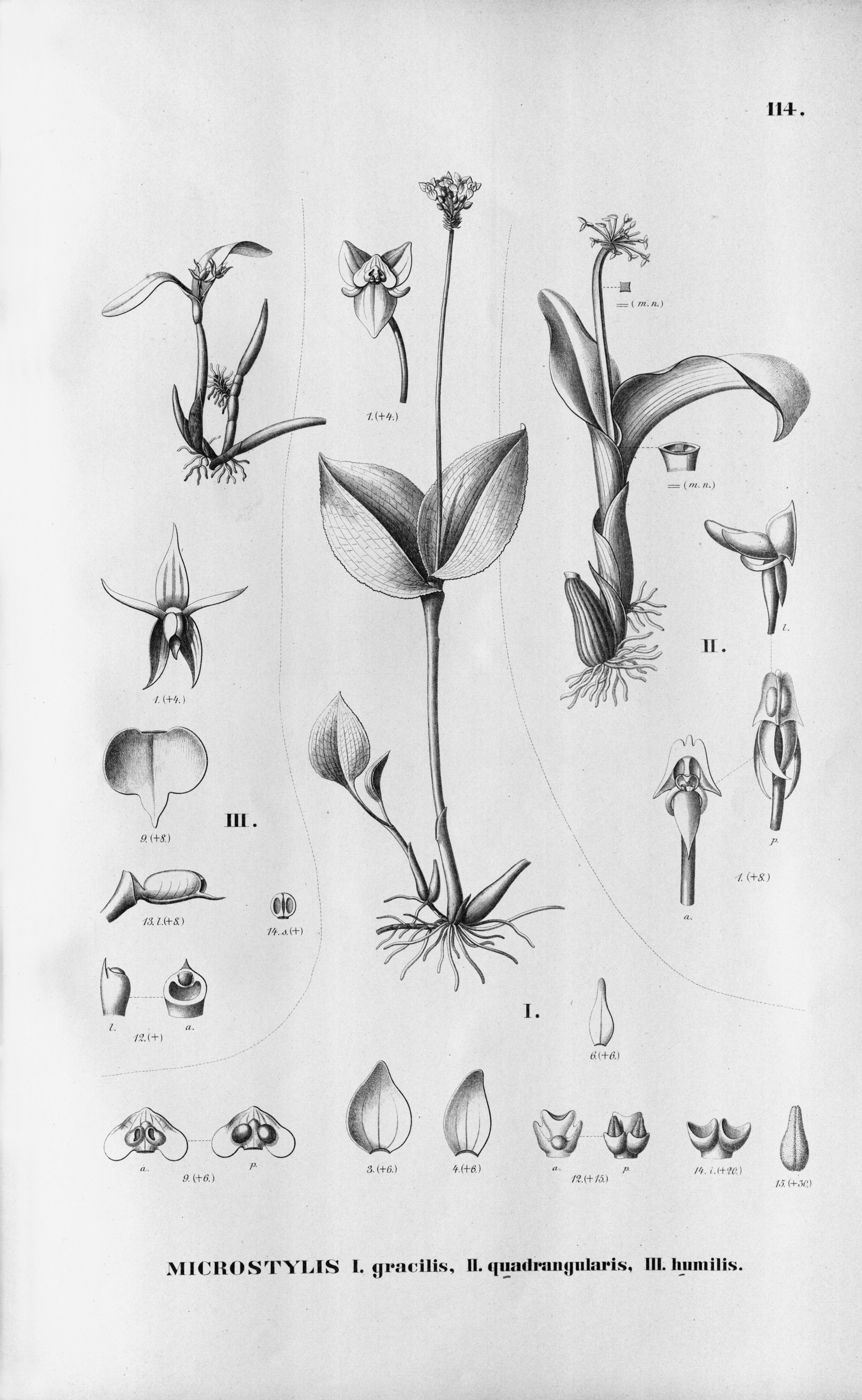
- 1906 illustration

Scientific classification
- Kingdom: Plantae
- Clade: Tracheophytes
- Clade: Angiosperms
- Clade: Monocots
- Order: Asparagales
- Family: Orchidaceae
- Subfamily: Epidendroideae
- Genus: Malaxis
- Species: M. cogniauxiana

Binomial name
- Malaxis cogniauxiana (Schltr.) Pabst 1967

Synonyms
- Microstylis cogniauxiana 1920 Schltr.; Microstylis gracilis Cogn. 1906, illegitimate homonym not Ridl. 1888

= Malaxis cogniauxiana =

Species of orchid

Malaxis cogniauxiana is a species of orchid native to Brazil.
