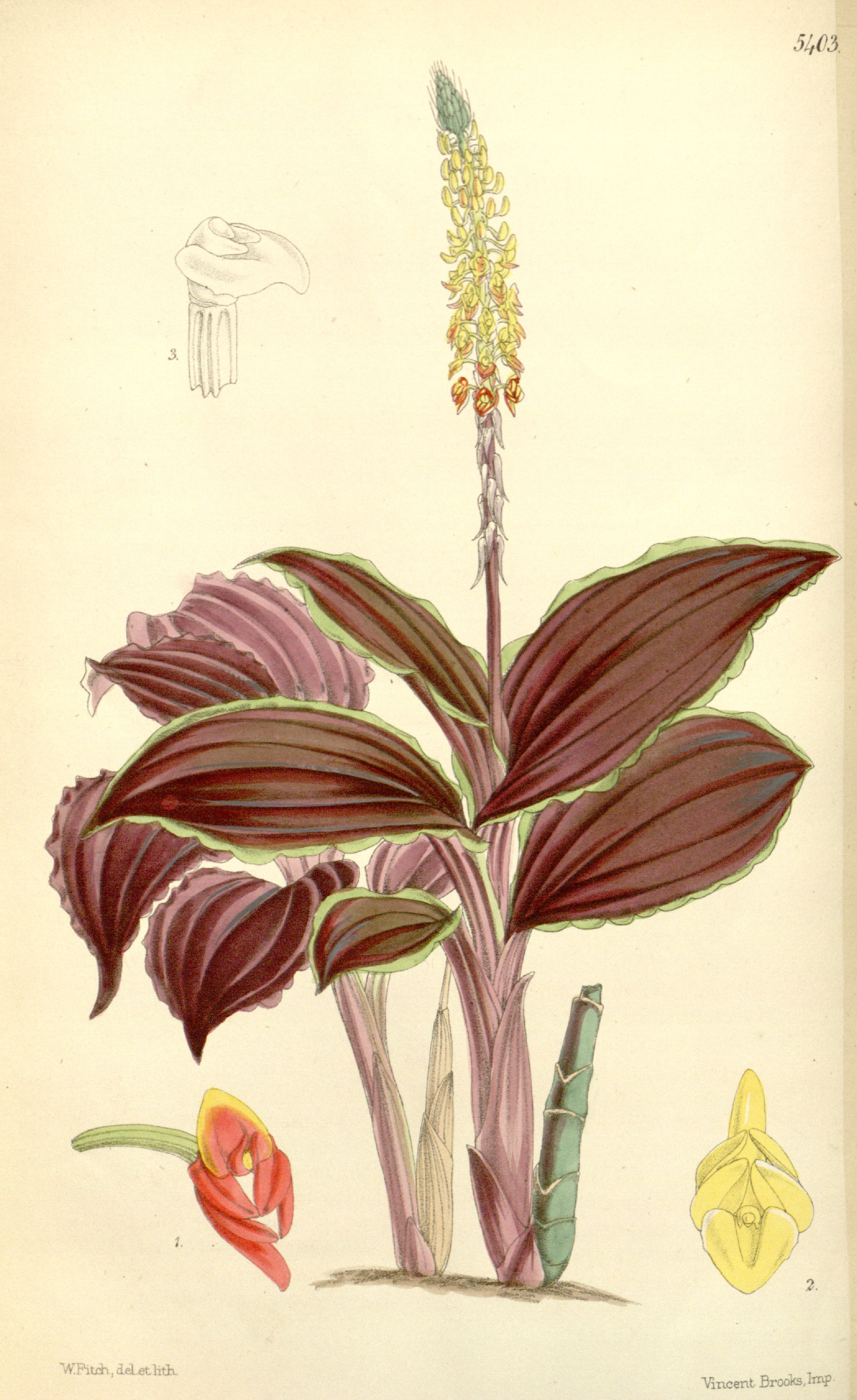
- 1863 lithograph

Scientific classification
- Kingdom: Plantae
- Clade: Tracheophytes
- Clade: Angiosperms
- Clade: Monocots
- Order: Asparagales
- Family: Orchidaceae
- Subfamily: Epidendroideae
- Genus: Malaxis
- Species: M. discolor

Binomial name
- Malaxis discolor (Lindl.) Kuntze 1891

Synonyms
- Microstylis discolor Lindl. 1830; Seidenfia discolor (Lindl.) Szlach. 1995

= Malaxis discolor =

Species of orchid

Malaxis discolor is a species of orchid that is endemic to Sri Lanka.

It generally has purple leaves and yellow flowers.
