= Cyperus swartzii =

Scientific classification
- Kingdom: Plantae
- Clade: Tracheophytes
- Clade: Angiosperms
- Clade: Monocots
- Clade: Commelinids
- Order: Poales
- Family: Cyperaceae
- Genus: Cyperus
- Species: C. swartzii

Binomial name
- Cyperus swartzii (A.Dietr.) Boeckeler ex Kük., 1926

Species of sedge

Cyperus swartzii, commonly known as Swartz's flatsedge, is a species of sedge that is native to southern parts of North America, northern parts of South America, Central America, and the Caribbean.

== See also ==
- List of Cyperus species
