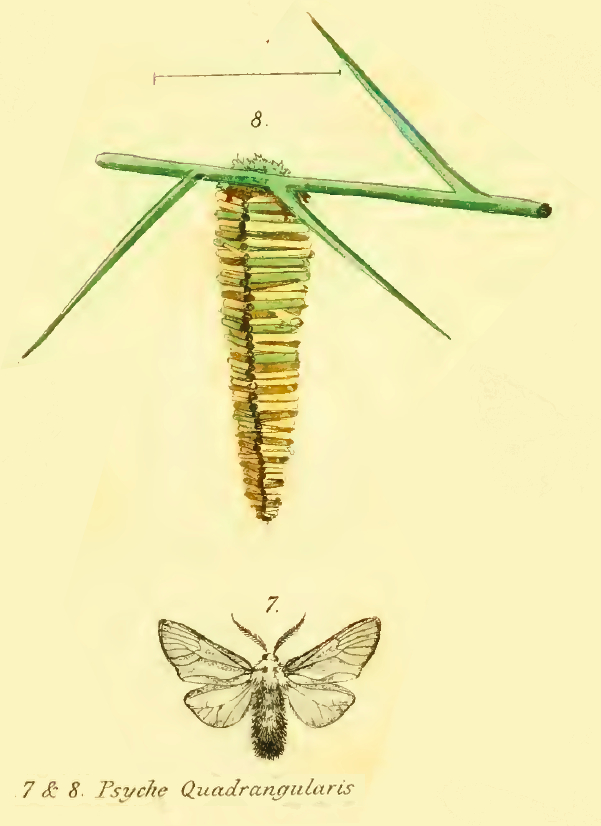
- Psyche quadrangularis case and adult

Scientific classification
- Domain: Eukaryota
- Kingdom: Animalia
- Phylum: Arthropoda
- Class: Insecta
- Order: Lepidoptera
- Family: Psychidae
- Genus: Psyche
- Species: P. quadrangularis

Binomial name
- Psyche quadrangularis (Christoph, 1873)

Synonyms
- Amicta quadrangularis Christoph, 1873; Psyche quadrangularis Staudinger, 1874; Psyche quadrangularis var. nigrescens Staudinger, 1900

= Psyche quadrangularis =

Species of moth

Psyche quadrangularis is a moth of the Psychidae family. It is found in the grasslands and deserts of Southwestern and Central Asia.

The larvae build a typical square-shaped case made of small twigs they cut to size and join at almost perfect right angles.
