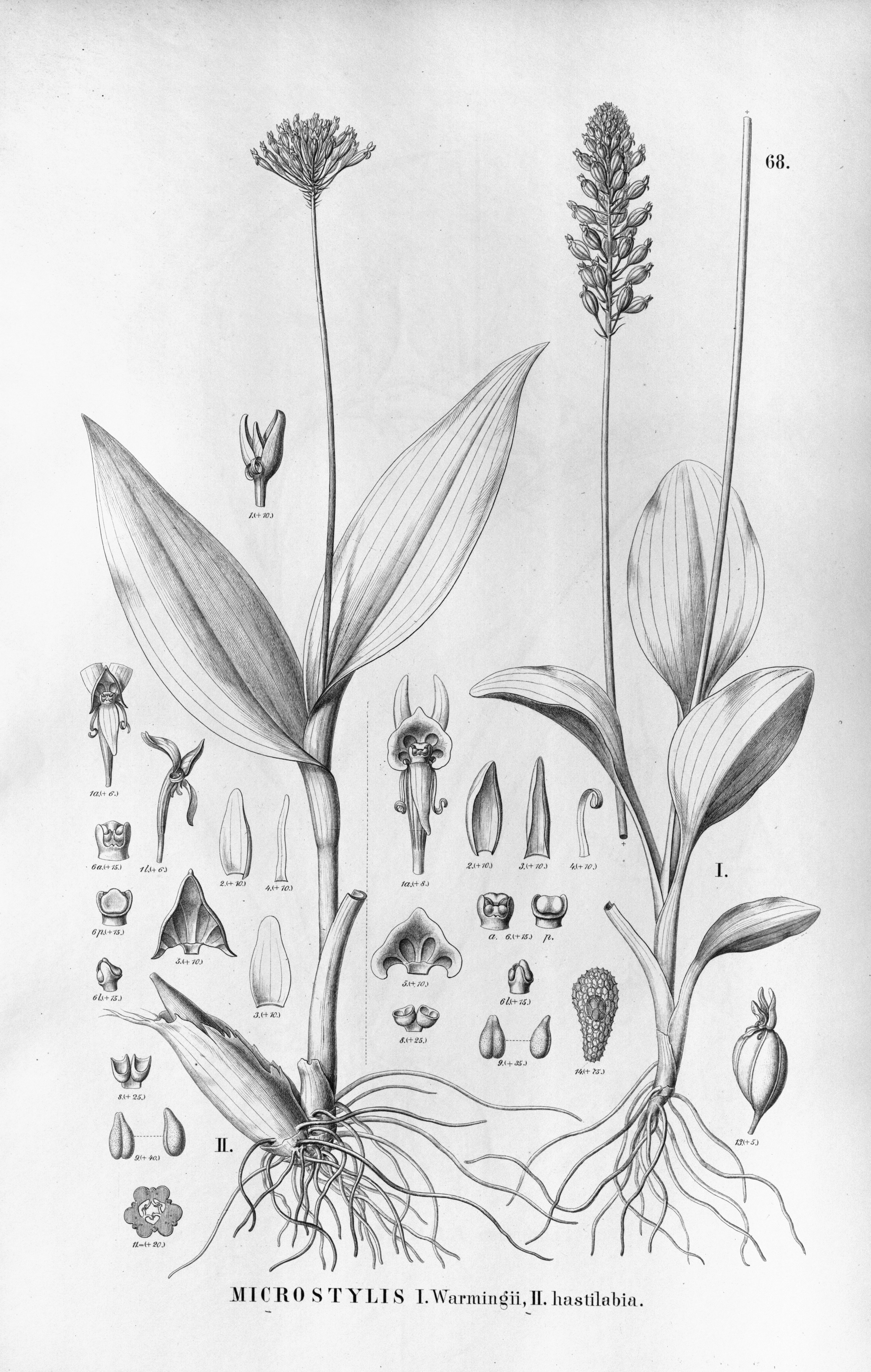
- 1895 drawing Malaxis excavata is at left as Microstylis hastilabia

Scientific classification
- Kingdom: Plantae
- Clade: Tracheophytes
- Clade: Angiosperms
- Clade: Monocots
- Order: Asparagales
- Family: Orchidaceae
- Subfamily: Epidendroideae
- Genus: Malaxis
- Species: M. excavata

Binomial name
- Malaxis excavata (Lindl.) Kuntze 1891

Synonyms
- List: Microstylis excavata Lindl. 1838; Cheiropterocephalus sertuliferus Barb.Rodr.; Epidendrum umbellatum Vell. 1827 not G. Forst. 1786; Malaxis caracasana (Klotzsch ex Ridl.) Kuntze; Malaxis carpinterae (Schltr.) Ames; Malaxis hastilabia (Rchb.f.) Kuntze; Malaxis maguirei C.Schweinf.; Malaxis ottonis (Schltr.) Carnevali & I.Ramírez; Malaxis sertulifera (Barb.Rodr.) Pabst; Malaxis uncinata Ames & C.Schweinf.; Microstylis caracasana Klotzsch ex Ridl.; Microstylis carpinterae Schltr.; Microstylis hastilabia Rchb.f.; Microstylis hastilabia var. major Porsch; Microstylis muelleri Schltr.; Microstylis ottonis Schltr.; Microstylis paranaensis Schltr.; Microstylis quadrangularis Cogn.; Microstylis sertulifera (Barb.Rodr.) Schltr.; Microstylis spiralipetala Cogn.

= Malaxis excavata =

Species of orchid

Malaxis excavata is a species of orchid widespread across much of Mesoamerica and South America from Mexico to Argentina. It has green flowers in a flat-topped array.
