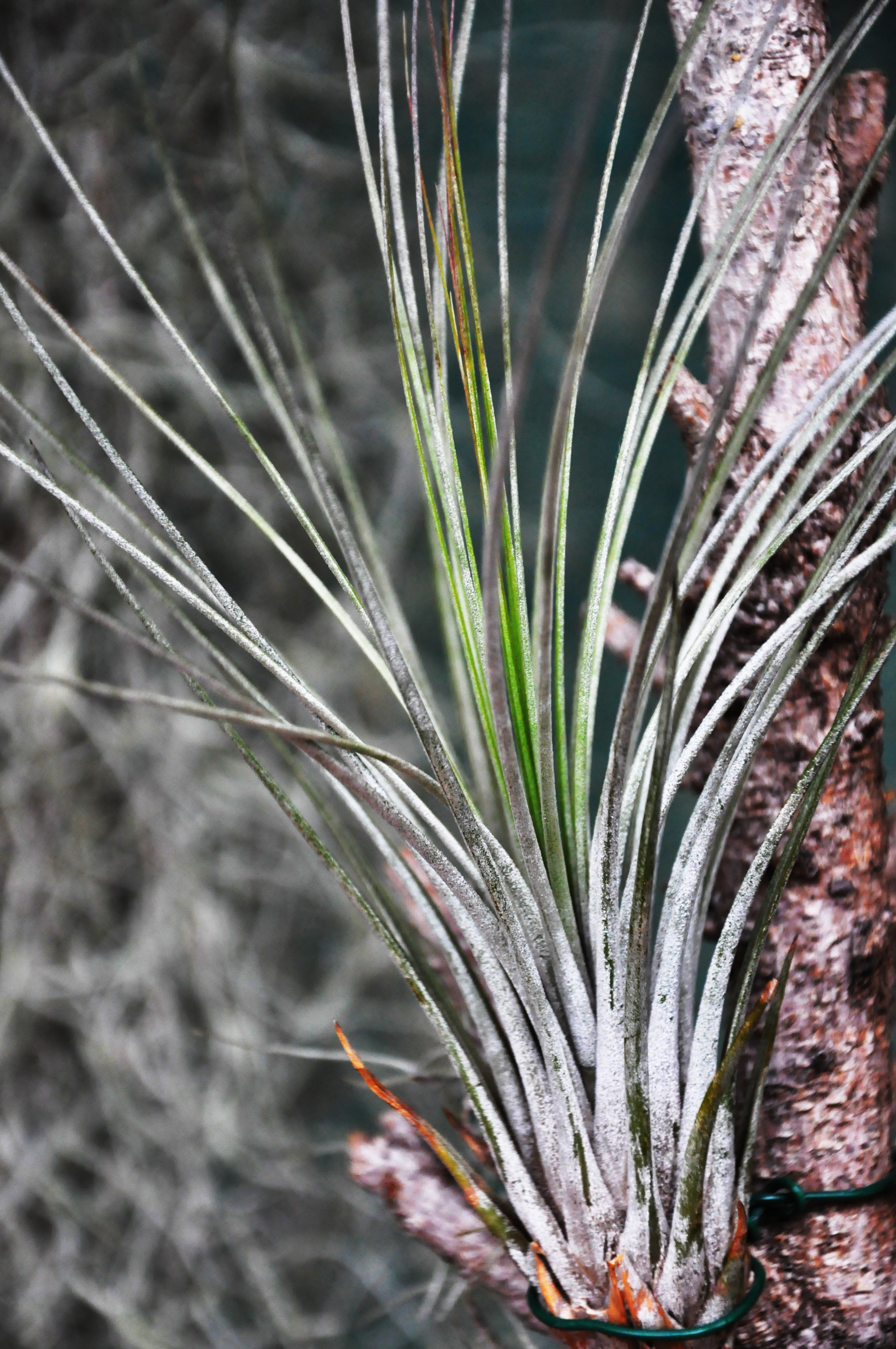

Scientific classification
- Kingdom: Plantae
- Clade: Tracheophytes
- Clade: Angiosperms
- Clade: Monocots
- Clade: Commelinids
- Order: Poales
- Family: Bromeliaceae
- Genus: Tillandsia
- Subgenus: Tillandsia subg. Tillandsia
- Species: T. juncea

Binomial name
- Tillandsia juncea (Ruiz & Pav.) Poir.

Synonyms
- Bonapartea juncea Ruiz & Pav.; Misandra juncea (Ruiz & Pav.) F.Dietr.; Acanthospora juncea (Ruiz & Pav.) Spreng.; Platystachys juncea (Ruiz & Pav.) Beer; Tillandsia quadrangularis M.Martens & Galeotti; Tillandsia juncifolia Regel

= Tillandsia juncea =

Species of plant

Tillandsia juncea is a species of flowering plant in the family Bromeliaceae. This species is native to northern South America (Colombia, Venezuela, Ecuador, Peru, Bolivia, eastern Brazil), Central America, Mexico and the West Indies (Cuba, Hispaniola, Jamaica, Trinidad).

== Cultivars ==
- Tillandsia 'But'
- Tillandsia 'Cataco'
- Tillandsia 'Little Star'
- Tillandsia 'Sea Urchin'
