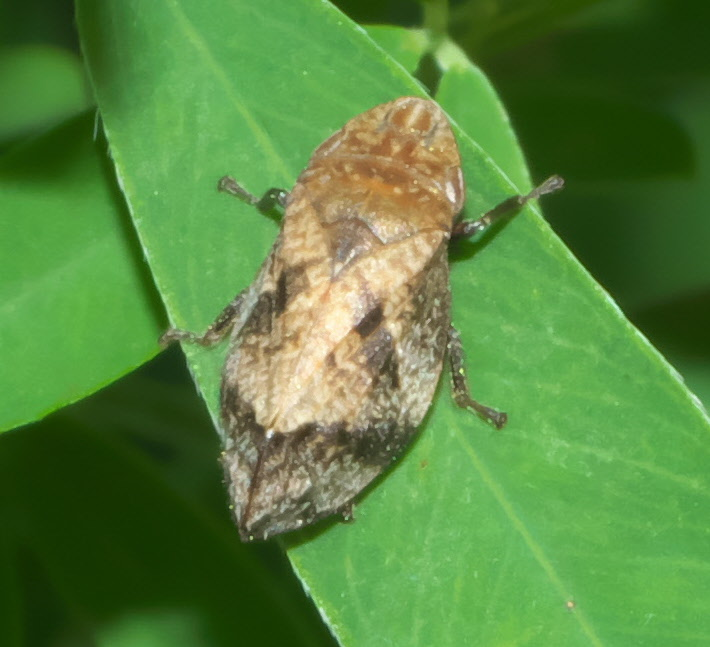

Scientific classification
- Domain: Eukaryota
- Kingdom: Animalia
- Phylum: Arthropoda
- Class: Insecta
- Order: Hemiptera
- Suborder: Auchenorrhyncha
- Family: Aphrophoridae
- Genus: Lepyronia
- Species: L. quadrangularis

Binomial name
- Lepyronia quadrangularis Say, 1825

= Lepyronia quadrangularis =

Species of true bug

Lepyronia quadrangularis is a species of spittle bug that can be found in many places in the world. The adults are brownish with two oblique darker brown bands that strike across their fore wings (hemelytra). The fore wings are also marked with a small blackish curve at their tips. The eggs are laid between the leaf and the main stem of grasses from midsummer to late fall. The nymphs feed and molt under spittle and hibernate in the egg stage. Lepyronia quadrangularis is polyphagous, feeding upon a variety of grasses, shrubs, and herbs. Its common name is diamond-backed spittle bug.
