= Manjur, India =

Manjur
- village
- Location in Tamil Nadu, India Manjur (India)
- Coordinates: 9.4622°N 78.6502°E
- Country: India
- State: Tamil Nadu

Languages
  - Official: Tamil
- Time zone: UTC+5:30 (IST)

Manjur is a village in Bogalur block, Paramakudi Taluk, Ramanathapuram district, Tamil Nadu.

There is a District Institute of Teacher Education. The village is situated on NH 49, Madurai Mandapam Highway.

Agriculture is the predominant occupation. Every year, the Rice, Chilli and Cotton are cultivated by the farmers. There are several brick kilns and rice Mills.

It has primary & Higher Secondary school, District Teacher Training School, Veterinary hospital, Primary Health Center, Library, Canara Bank, Post Office, Panchayat Office, VAO Guest House, good water facilities, well maintained pond,

This village has a Lord Shiva temple, Ayyanar Temple, Karuppannaswamy Temple, .
