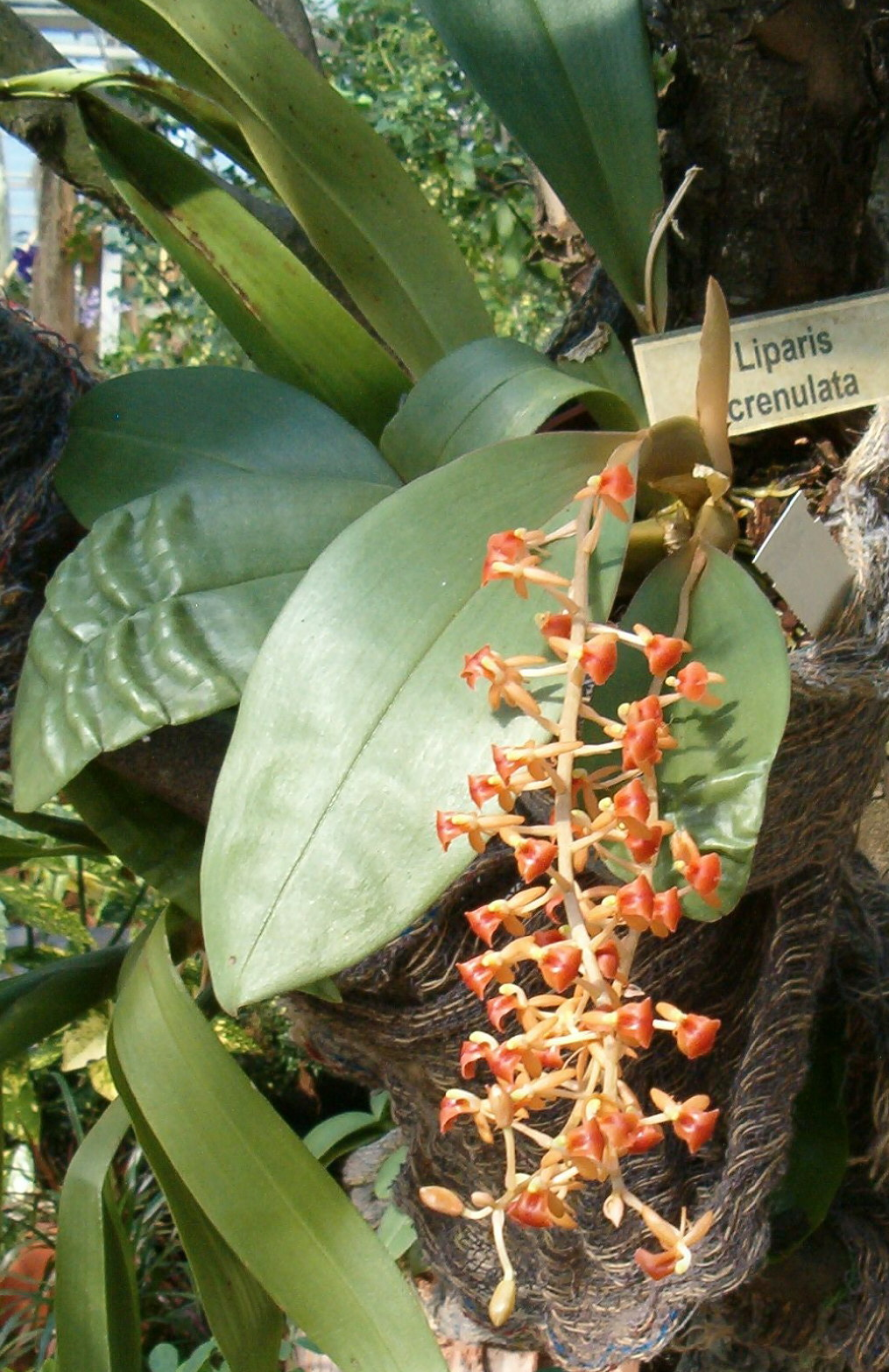
- Liparis crenulata in the Berlin Botanical Garden

Scientific classification
- Kingdom: Plantae
- Clade: Tracheophytes
- Clade: Angiosperms
- Clade: Monocots
- Order: Asparagales
- Family: Orchidaceae
- Subfamily: Epidendroideae
- Tribe: Malaxideae
- Subtribe: Malaxidinae
- Genus: Liparis; Rich.

Type species
- Liparis loeselii (L.) Rich.

Species
- See text

Synonyms
- Leptorkis Thouars; Pseudorchis Gray nom. illeg.; Empusa Lindl.; Anistylis Raf.; Sturmia Rchb. nom. illeg.; Paliris Dumort.; Empusaria Rchb.; Platystylis Lindl. nom. illeg.; Diteilis Raf.; Mesoptera Raf.nom. rej.; Dituilis Raf.; Iebine Raf.; Alipsa Hoffmanns.; Cestichis Thouars ex Pfitzer; Platystyliparis Marg.; Ypsilorchis Z.J.Liu, S.C.Chen & L.J.Chen

= Liparis (plant) =

Genus of plants

Liparis, commonly known as widelip orchids, sphinx orchids or 羊耳蒜属 (yáng'ěrsuàn shǔ) is a cosmopolitan genus of more than 350 species of orchids in the family Orchidaceae. Plants in this genus are terrestrial, lithophytic or epiphytic herbs with a wide range of forms. The flowers are usually resupinate and small to medium sized, yellow, yellow-green or purplish with spreading sepals and petals. The labellum is usually larger than the sepals and petals and is lobed, sometimes with a toothed or wavy margin and one or two calli at its base.

== Description ==
Orchids in the genus Liparis are terrestrial, lithophytic or epiphytic herbs, usually with one to a few leaves which may be linear to egg-shaped, thin or leathery and sometimes pleated. The flowers are small to medium sized, resupinate and arranged on a flowering stem with small bracts. The flowers are usually dull yellow, yellow-green or purplish and often have an unpleasant odour. The sepals and petals turn downwards and the dorsal sepal is free but the lateral sepals are sometimes fused for at least part of their length. The petals are free from each other and often different in size and shape from the sepals. The labellum is usually larger than both the sepals and petals, often lobed with a toothed or wavy edge and one or two calli at its base. There are two pairs of waxy, oval pollinia, each with a viscidium.

== Taxonomy and naming ==
The genus Liparis was first formally described in 1817 by Louis Claude Richard and the description was published in Die Orchideis Europaeis Annotationes. The name Liparis is from the Ancient Greek word liparos meaning "oily", "greasy", "sleek" or "shiny", referring to the smooth leaves.

== Distribution ==
Species of Liparis occur on every continent except Antarctica. They are found in tropical Asia, subtropical and tropical parts of the Americas, Africa, New Guinea and Australia. There are sixty three species in China, twenty of which are endemic to that country, two in North America and one in Europe.

== Selected species ==
- Liparis angustilabris (F.Muell.) Blaxell – Queensland
- Liparis bautingensis Tang & F.T.Wang – China
- Liparis bracteata T.E.Hunt – Queensland
- Liparis coelogynoides (F.Muell.) Benth. – N.S.W., Qld.
- Liparis condylobulbon Rchb.f. – Taiwan, Indochina to south-west Pacific
- Liparis crenulata (Blume) Lindl. – Indonesia
- Liparis elegans Lindl. – Indonesia, New Guinea
- Liparis fissipetala Finet – China
- Liparis fleckeri Nicholls – Qld.
- Liparis goodyeroides Schltr. – Africa
- Liparis grossa Schltr. – Taiwan, Orchid Island, Philippines
- Liparis habenarina (F.Muell.) F.Muell. ex Benth. – Australia
- Liparis hawaiensis (Blume) Lindl. – Hawaiian Islands
- Liparis hostifolia (Koidz.) Koidz. ex Nakai – Japan
- Liparis latifolia Lindl. – China, Southeast Asia, the Philippines, New Guinea
- Liparis liliifolia (L.) Rich. ex Lindl. – North America
- Liparis loeselii (L.) Rich. – Europe, Asia, North America
- Liparis nervosa (Thunb.) Lindl. – Asia, Africa, America
- Liparis nugentiae F.M.Bailey – Qld.
- Liparis petricola (D.L.Jones & B.Gray) Bostock – Qld.
- Liparis pingxiangensis L.Li & H.F.Yan – China
- Liparis reflexa (R.Br.) Lindl. – N.S.W.
- Liparis sanamalabarica P.M.Salim – India
- Liparis simmondsii F.M.Bailey – Qld.
- Liparis swenssonii F.M.Bailey – N.S.W., Qld.
