= Liparis coelogynoides =

Fairy sphinx orchid

Scientific classification
- Kingdom: Plantae
- Clade: Tracheophytes
- Clade: Angiosperms
- Clade: Monocots
- Order: Asparagales
- Family: Orchidaceae
- Subfamily: Epidendroideae
- Subtribe: Malaxidinae
- Genus: Liparis
- Species: L. coelogynoides

Binomial name
- Liparis coelogynoides (F.Muell.) Benth.

Synonyms
- Sturmia coelogynoides F.Muell.; Leptorkis coelogynodes (F.Muell.) Kuntze; Cestichis coelogynoides (F.Muell.) M.A.Clem. & D.L.Jones; Stichorkis coelogynoides (F.Muell.) Marg., Szlach. & Kulak

Species of orchid

Liparis coelogynoides, commonly known as the fairy sphinx orchid, is a plant in the orchid family and is endemic to near-coastal eastern Australia. It is an epiphytic orchid with two leaves joined at the base and that grows in clumps. Greenish white or yellowish flowers are borne on an often hanging spike. It grows on trees and cliff faces usually on ranges near the coast of northern New South Wales and southern Queensland.

== Description ==
Liparis coelogynoides is an epiphytic herb with oval to almost spherical pseudobulbs 8–12 mm (0.3–0.5 in) and 12–16 mm (0.5–0.6 in) wide. There are usually two linear to narrow egg-shaped, pale green, stalkless leaves, 50–150 mm (2–6 in), 8–15 mm (0.3–0.6 in) wide and folded lengthwise. Between eight and twenty greenish white or yellowish flowers, 11–14 mm (0.4–0.6 in) long and 10–12 mm (0.39–0.47 in) wide are borne on an often hanging flowering stem 100–200 mm (4–8 in) long. The sepals are all free from each other, 7–10 mm (0.3–0.4 in) long, about 1.5 mm (0.06 in) wide and spread widely apart from each other. The petals are 6–9 mm (0.2–0.4 in) long and about 1 mm (0.04 in) wide. The labellum is wedge-shaped, bends downwards, 8–11 mm (0.3–0.4 in) long and 4–5 mm (0.16–0.20 in) wide with irregular teeth on the edge. Flowering occurs between November and March.

== Taxonomy and naming ==
The fairy sphinx orchid was first formally described in 1860 by Ferdinand von Mueller who gave it the name Sturmia coelogynoides and published the description in Fragmenta phytographiae Australiae. The description was based on a collection made by Ludwig Becker near the headwaters of the Clarence River. In 1873, George Bentham changed the name to Liparis coelogynoides and published the change in Flora Australiensis. The specific epithet (coelogynoides) refers to the similarity of this species to orchids in the genus Coelogyne - the ending -oides is a Latin suffix meaning "like", "resembling" or "having the form of".

== Distribution and habitat ==
Liparis coelogynoides is widespread and common, growing on trees and rocky escarpments in rainforest between the Bunya Mountains in Queensland and the Hunter River in New South Wales.
