= Gavilea australis =

Scientific classification
- Kingdom: Plantae
- Clade: Tracheophytes
- Clade: Angiosperms
- Clade: Monocots
- Order: Asparagales
- Family: Orchidaceae
- Subfamily: Orchidoideae
- Tribe: Cranichideae
- Genus: Gavilea
- Species: G. australis

Binomial name
- Gavilea australis (Skottsb.) M.N.Correa

Synonyms
- Asarca australis Skottsb.; Asarca enigmatica Hauman; Chloraea enigmatica (Hauman) Hoehne

Species of plant

Gavilea australis, the southern-most orchid, is a species of flowering plant in the family Orchidaceae. It is native to Tierra del Fuego and nearby parts of Chile and Argentina, and to the Falkland Islands. An erect terrestrial perennial typically 30 to 50 cm (12 to 20 in) tall, it was originally described by Carl Skottsberg in 1913 as Asarca australis.
