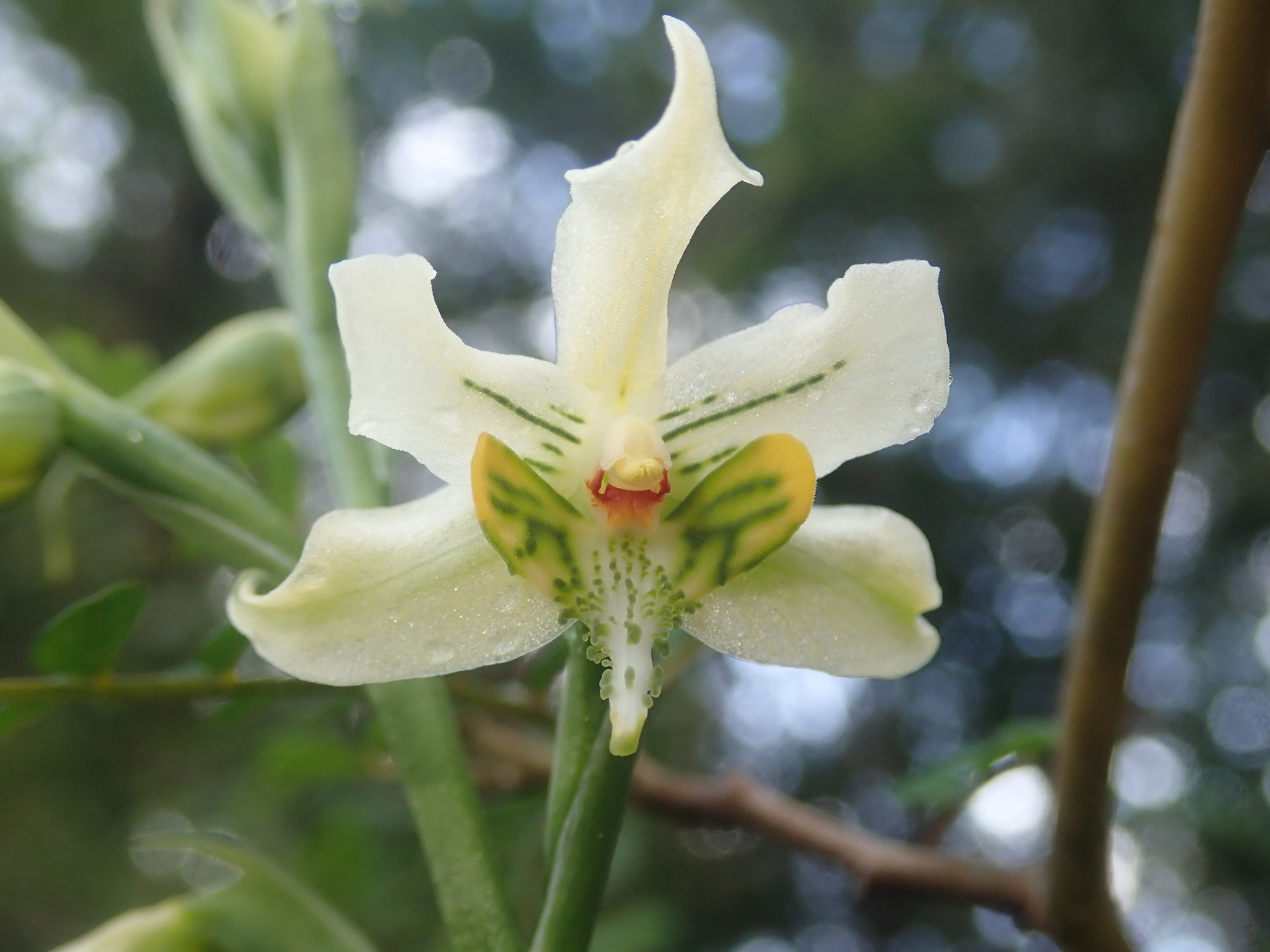

Scientific classification
- Kingdom: Plantae
- Clade: Tracheophytes
- Clade: Angiosperms
- Clade: Monocots
- Order: Asparagales
- Family: Orchidaceae
- Subfamily: Orchidoideae
- Tribe: Cranichideae
- Genus: Gavilea
- Species: G. araucana

Binomial name
- Gavilea araucana (Phil.) M.N.Correa

= Gavilea araucana =

Species of orchid

Gavilea araucana is a species of orchid. It is native to Chile (between Valparaíso and Magallanes regions) and Argentina.
