= Liparis nugentiae =

Large sphinx orchid

Scientific classification
- Kingdom: Plantae
- Clade: Tracheophytes
- Clade: Angiosperms
- Clade: Monocots
- Order: Asparagales
- Family: Orchidaceae
- Subfamily: Epidendroideae
- Subtribe: Malaxidinae
- Genus: Liparis
- Species: L. nugentiae

Binomial name
- Liparis nugentiae F.M.Bailey

Synonyms
- Cestichis nugentiae (F.M.Bailey) M.A.Clem. & D.L.Jones; Stichorkis nugentiae (F.M.Bailey) Marg., Szlach. & Kulak

Species of orchid

Liparis nugentiae, commonly known as the large sphinx orchid, is a plant in the orchid family and is endemic to Queensland. It is an epiphytic or lithophytic orchid which forms clumps with flattened pseudobulbs, two to four thin leaves and up to twenty greenish or pale yellow flowers. It grows in rainforest at altitudes above 600 m (2,000 ft) in tropical far North Queensland.

== Description ==
Liparis nugentiae is an epiphytic or lithophytic, clump-forming herb with crowded, dark green to yellowish, flattened overlapping pseudobulbs. There are two to four thin, dark green to yellowish, linear to lance-shaped leaves 120–300 mm (5–10 in) long and 20–30 mm (0.8–1 in) wide. Between eight and twenty greenish or pale yellow flowers, 13–17 mm (0.5–0.7 in) long and 8–11 mm (0.3–0.4 in) wide are borne on a sometimes arching flowering stem 150–250 mm (6–10 in) long. The sepals are 8–12 mm (0.3–0.5 in) long, 1.5–2 mm (0.06–0.08 in) wide and the petals are a similar length but only about 1 mm (0.04 in) wide. The sepals and petals curve downwards. The labellum is 13–16 mm (0.5–0.6 in) long and 7–9 mm (0.3–0.4 in) wide with a channelled base and two orange bands. Flowering occurs between September and January.

== Taxonomy and naming ==
Liparis nugentiae was first formally described in 1896 by Frederick Manson Bailey and the description was published in the Department of Agriculture Queensland, Botany Bulletin. The collection was based on a specimen collected by L.J. Nugent on a mountain range near Cairns.

== Distribution and habitat ==
The large sphinx orchid grows on trees and rocks in rainforest that is often in mist. It is widespread and common between Rossville and Eungella National Park.
