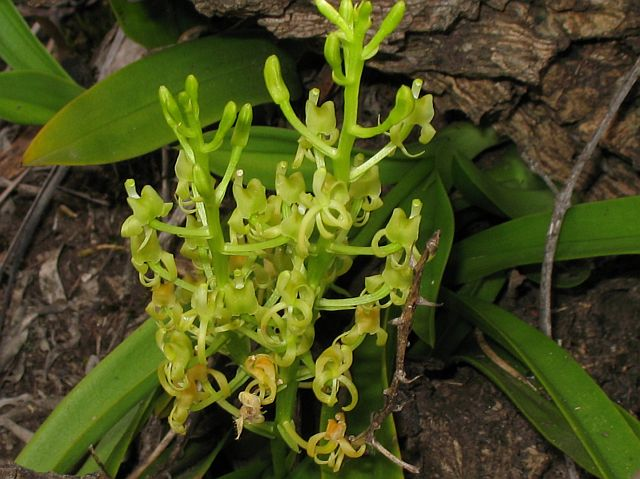

Scientific classification
- Kingdom: Plantae
- Clade: Tracheophytes
- Clade: Angiosperms
- Clade: Monocots
- Order: Asparagales
- Family: Orchidaceae
- Subfamily: Epidendroideae
- Subtribe: Malaxidinae
- Genus: Liparis
- Species: L. reflexa

Binomial name
- Liparis reflexa (R.Br.) Lindl.

Synonyms
- Cymbidium reflexum R.Br.; Sturmia reflexa (R.Br.) F.Muell.; Leptorkis reflexa (R.Br.) Kuntze; Cestichis reflexa (R.Br.) M.A.Clem. & D.L.Jones; Stichorkis reflexa (R.Br.) Marg., Szlach. & Kulak; Liparis foliosa Lindl.; Alipsa foliosa (Lindl.) Hoffmanns.; Sturmia cuneilabris Benth.; Liparis decursiva Rchb.f.; Stichorkis decursiva (Rchb.f.) Marg., Szlach. & Kulak

= Liparis reflexa =

Tom cats

Species of orchid

Liparis reflexa, commonly known as tom cats, onion orchid or dog orchid, is a plant in the orchid family and is endemic to New South Wales. It is a lithophytic orchid with up to four leaves and up to thirty or more yellowish green flowers which smell like urine. It grows on rocks, sometimes on the ground, in moist forests.

== Description ==
Liparis reflexa is a lithophytic, rarely a terrestrial herb with more or less oval pseudobulbs 20–40 mm (0.8–2 in) and 15–30 mm (0.6–1 in) wide. There are up to four linear to lance-shaped, dark to yellowish green leaves, 100–300 mm (4–10 in), 10–15 mm (0.4–0.6 in) wide and folded lengthwise. Between five and thirty or more yellowish green flowers, 10–15 mm (0.4–0.6 in) long and 8–10 mm (0.3–0.4 in) wide are borne on a flowering stem 100–300 mm (4–10 in) long. The flowers smell like urine or a wet dog. Each flower has a pedicel 6–16 mm (0.2–0.6 in) long, including the ovary. The sepals are 7–10 mm (0.3–0.4 in) long, about 2 mm (0.08 in) wide and the petals are a similar length but only about 1 mm (0.04 in) wide. The labellum is 7–10 mm (0.3–0.4 in) long, 3–4 mm (0.1–0.2 in) wide and turns downward and backward on itself. Flowering occurs between February and June.

== Taxonomy and naming ==
Tom cats was first formally described in 1810 by Robert Brown who gave it the name Cymbidium reflexum and published the description in Prodromus Florae Novae Hollandiae et Insulae Van Diemen. In 1825, John Lindley changed the name to Liparis reflexa. The specific epithet (reflexa) is a Latin word meaning "bent" or "turned back".

== Distribution and habitat ==
Liparis reflexa usually grows on rocks, including on escarpments and boulders in gorges and only rarely on trees. It is found between the Clyde River, Hastings River and Hunter River valleys.

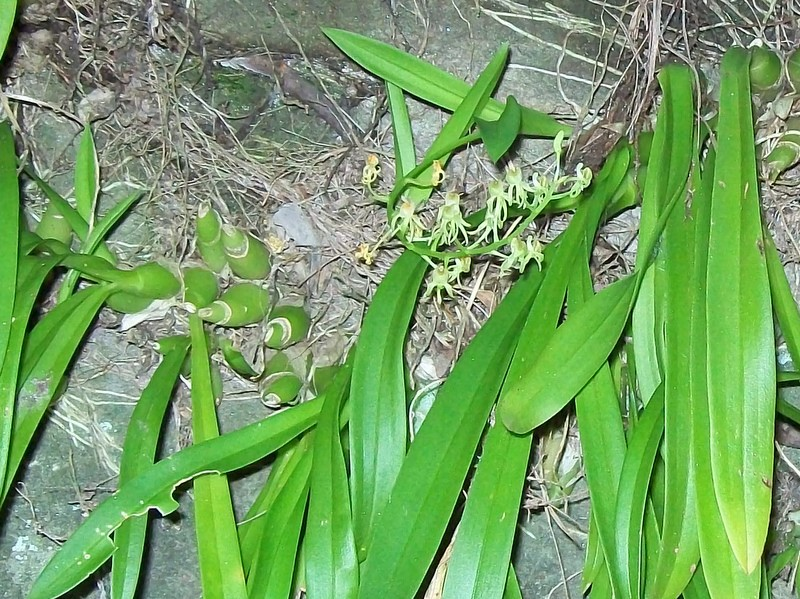
Liparis reflexa in Ku-ring-gai Chase National Park

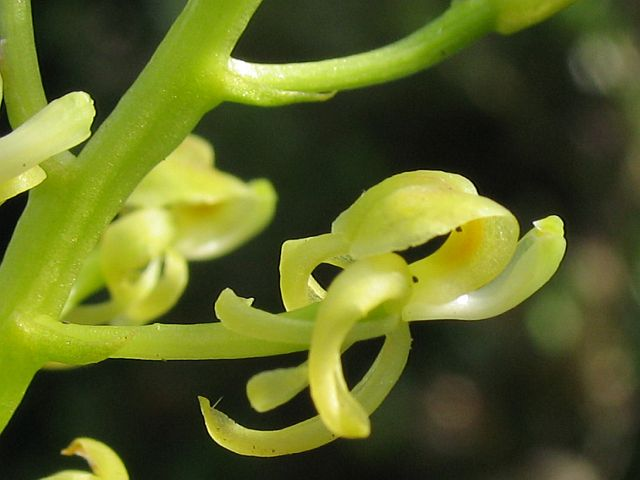
Close-up of L. reflexa flower
