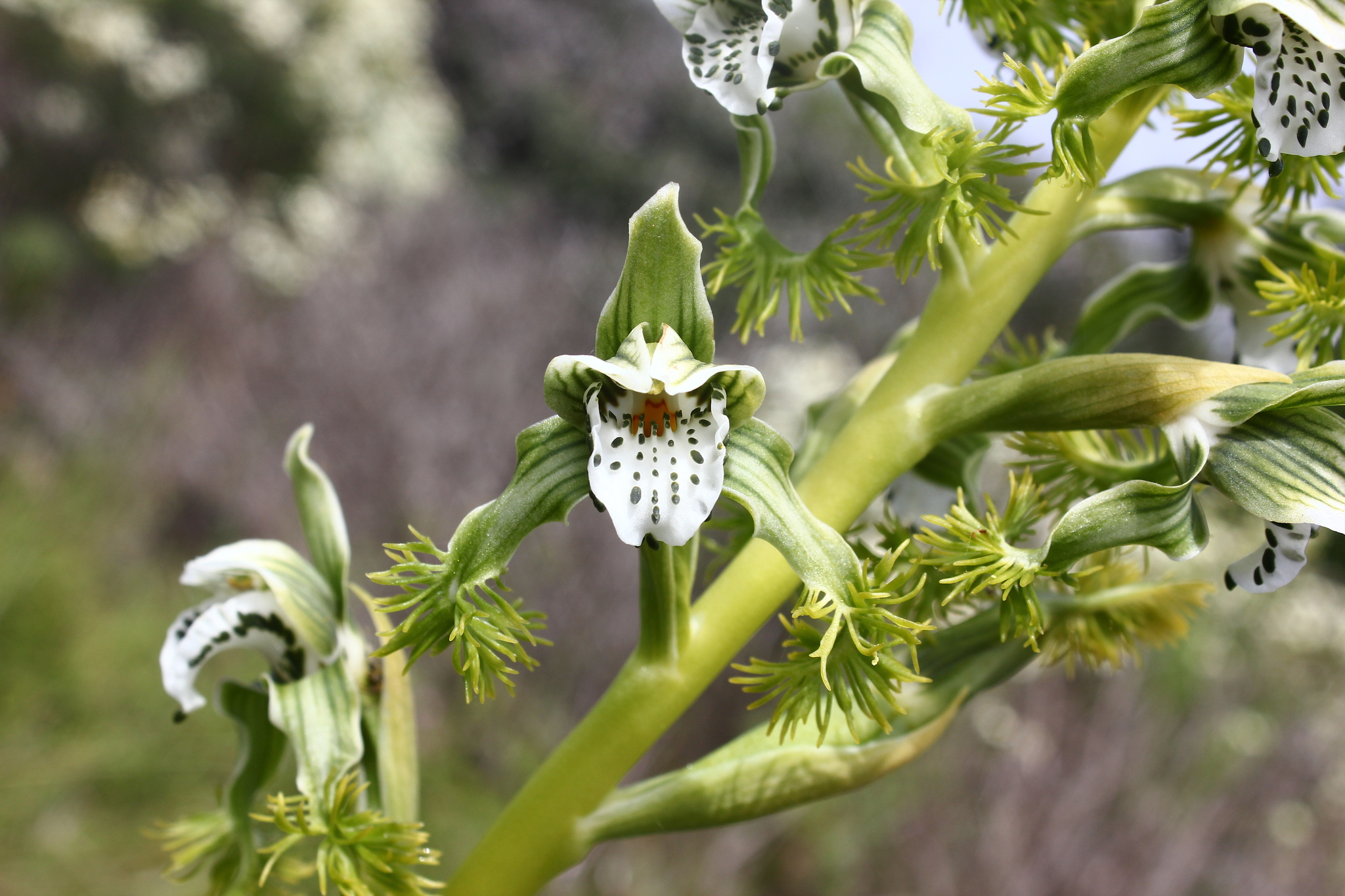

Conservation status
- CITES Appendix II

Scientific classification
- Kingdom: Plantae
- Clade: Tracheophytes
- Clade: Angiosperms
- Clade: Monocots
- Order: Asparagales
- Family: Orchidaceae
- Subfamily: Orchidoideae
- Tribe: Cranichideae
- Genus: Bipinnula
- Species: B. fimbriata

Binomial name
- Bipinnula fimbriata (Poepp.) I.M.Johnst.

Synonyms
- Chloraea fimbriata Poepp.; Bipinnula mystacina Lindl.; Jouyella fimbriata (Poepp.) Szlach. & Marg.

= Bipinnula fimbriata =

Species of flowering plant

Bipinnula fimbriata is a species of orchid endemic to central Chile.
