= Liparis bracteata =

Yellow sphinx orchid

Scientific classification
- Kingdom: Plantae
- Clade: Tracheophytes
- Clade: Angiosperms
- Clade: Monocots
- Order: Asparagales
- Family: Orchidaceae
- Subfamily: Epidendroideae
- Subtribe: Malaxidinae
- Genus: Liparis
- Species: L. bracteata

Binomial name
- Liparis bracteata T.E.Hunt

Synonyms
- Cestichis bracteata (T.E.Hunt) M.A.Clem. & D.L.Jones

Species of orchid

Liparis bracteata, commonly known as the yellow sphinx orchid, is a plant in the orchid family. It is an epiphytic or lithophytic orchid with cone-shaped pseudobulbs, each with two linear to lance-shaped leaves and between seven and twelve star-shaped pale green flowers that turn yellow as they age. This orchid grows on trees and rocks in rainforest in tropical North Queensland.

== Description ==
Liparis bracteata is an epiphytic or lithophytic, clump-forming herb with smooth, dark green, cone-shaped pseudobulbs 30–50 mm (1.2–2.0 in) long, 20–25 mm (0.8–1 in) wide and covered with leaf like bracts when young. Each pseudobulb has two linear to lance-shaped, dark green leaves 150–250 mm (5.9–9.8 in) and 10–15 mm (0.4–0.6 in) wide. Between seven and twelve pale green flowers, 8–13 mm (0.31–0.51 in) long and 7–10 mm (0.28–0.39 in) wide are borne on a flowering stem 100–200 mm (3.9–7.9 in) long. The flowering stem has up to fifteen bracts and the flowers turn yellow as they age. The sepals are 8–10 mm (0.31–0.39 in) long and about 2 mm (0.08 in) wide, the petals a similar length but narrower. The labellum is 7–9 mm (0.28–0.35 in) long and 3–4 mm (0.12–0.16 in) wide with two green calli near its base and two orange ridges along its midline. Flowering occurs between July and September.

== Taxonomy and naming ==
Liparis bracteata was first formally described in 1946 by Trevor Edgar Hunt who published the description in the North Queensland Naturalist. The type specimen was collected by John Henry Wilkie on Mount Bartle Frere. The specific epithet (bracteata) is derived from the Latin word bractea, meaning "small leaf".

== Distribution and habitat ==
The yellow sphinx orchid grows on trees and rocks in rainforest between the Cedar Bay and the Tully River in Queensland.
