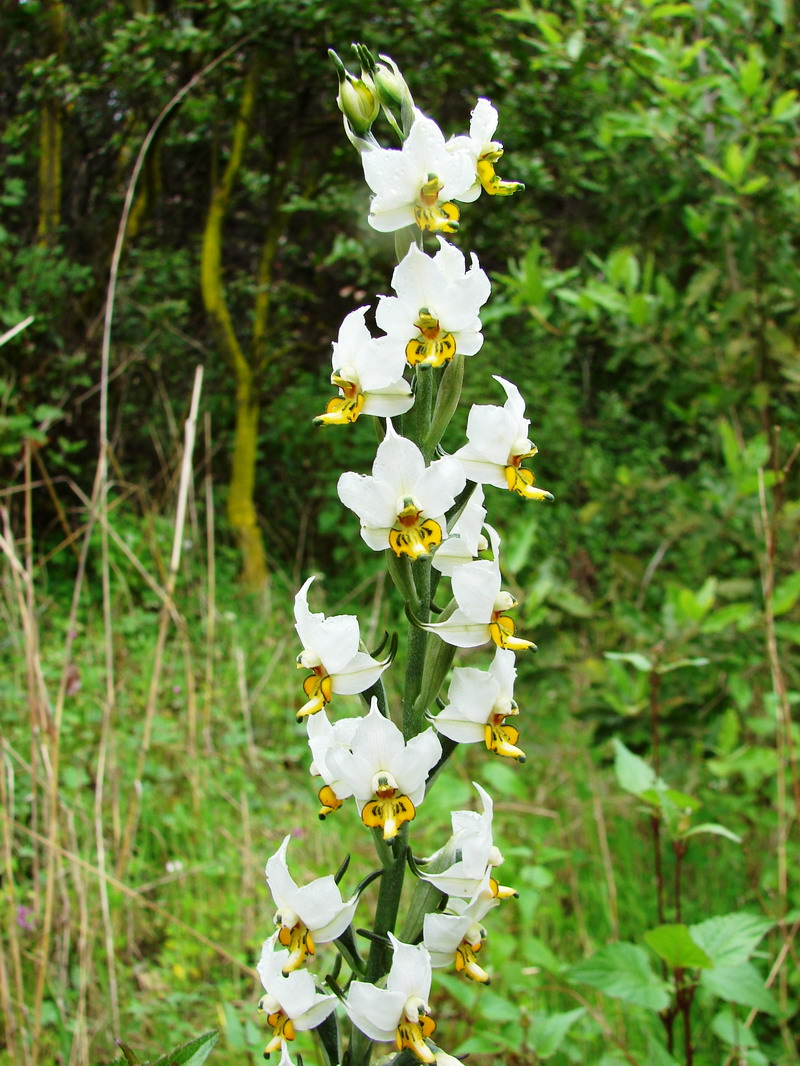
- Gavilea venosa (type species)

Scientific classification
- Kingdom: Plantae
- Clade: Tracheophytes
- Clade: Angiosperms
- Clade: Monocots
- Order: Asparagales
- Family: Orchidaceae
- Subfamily: Orchidoideae
- Tribe: Cranichideae
- Subtribe: Chloraeinae
- Genus: Gavilea; Poepp.

= Gavilea =

Genus of orchids

Gavilea is a genus of flowering plants from the orchid family, Orchidaceae. It is native to Chile (including the Juan Fernández Islands), Argentina and the Falkland Islands.

== Species ==
The genus Gavilea contains the following known species:

- Gavilea araucana (Phil.) M.N.Correa - Chile, Argentina
- Gavilea australis (Skottsb.) M.N.Correa - Falkland Islands, Tierra del Fuego
- Gavilea cardioglossa (Reiche) Martic. - Chile
- Gavilea gladysiae Chemisquy - Chile, Argentina
- Gavilea glandulifera (Poepp. & Endl.) M.N.Correa - Chile, Argentina
- Gavilea insularis M.N.Correa - Juan Fernández Islands
- Gavilea kingii (Hook.f.) M.N.Correa - southern Chile
- Gavilea litoralis (Phil.) M.N.Correa - southern Chile, southern Argentina, Falkland Islands
- Gavilea longibracteata (Lindl.) Sparre ex L.E.Navas - Chile
- Gavilea lutea (Comm. ex Pers.) M.N.Correa - Chile, Argentina
- Gavilea odoratissima Poepp. - Chile, Argentina
- Gavilea platyantha (Rchb.f.) Ormerod - Chile, Argentina
- Gavilea supralabellata M.N.Correa - Chile, Argentina
- Gavilea trullata Ormerod - Chile, Argentina
- Gavilea venosa (Lam.) Garay & Ormerod - Chile
- Gavilea wittei (Hicken) Ormerod - Chile, Argentina

== See also ==
- List of Orchidaceae genera
