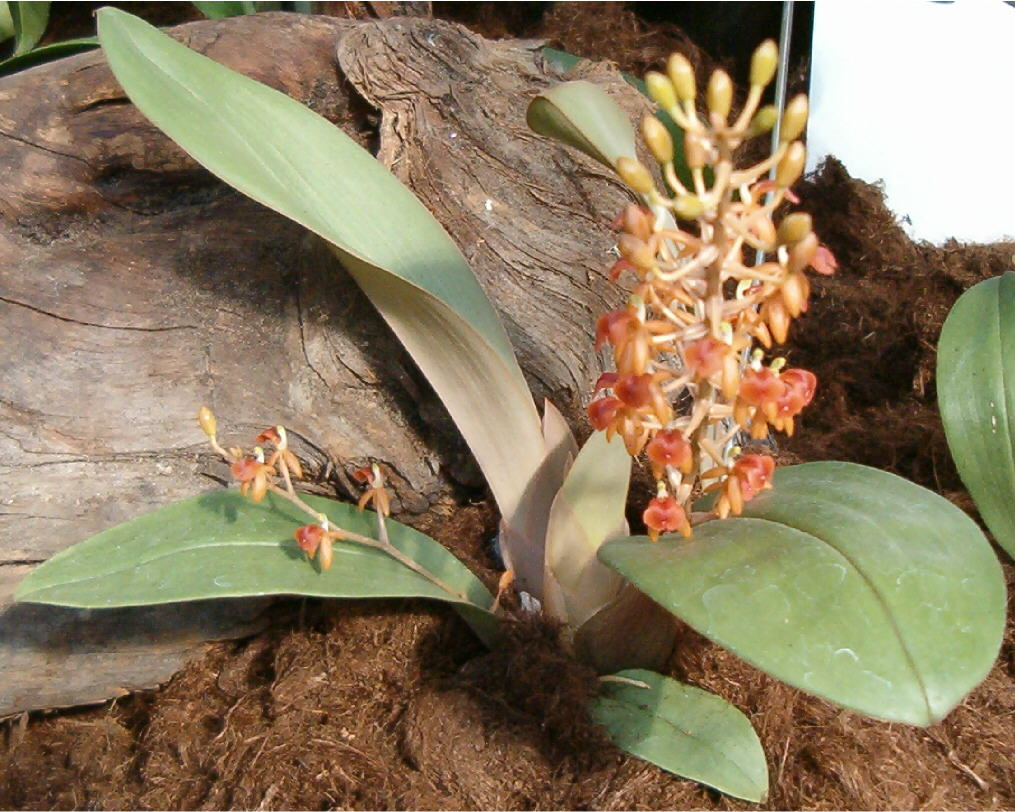

Scientific classification
- Kingdom: Plantae
- Clade: Tracheophytes
- Clade: Angiosperms
- Clade: Monocots
- Order: Asparagales
- Family: Orchidaceae
- Subfamily: Epidendroideae
- Subtribe: Malaxidinae
- Genus: Liparis
- Species: L. latifolia

Binomial name
- Liparis latifolia Lindl.

Synonyms
- Malaxis latifolia Blume 1825, illegitimate homonym, not Sm. 1812; Cestichis latifolia (Lindl.) Pfitzer; Leptorkis latifolia (Lindl.) Kuntze; Stichorkis latifolia (Lindl.) Pfitzer; Liparis fulgens Rolfe; Liparis robusta Hook.f.; Liparis scortechinii Hook.f.

= Liparis latifolia =

Species of orchid

Liparis latifolia is a species of orchid native to Hainan, Thailand, Indonesia, Malaysia, the Philippines and New Guinea.
