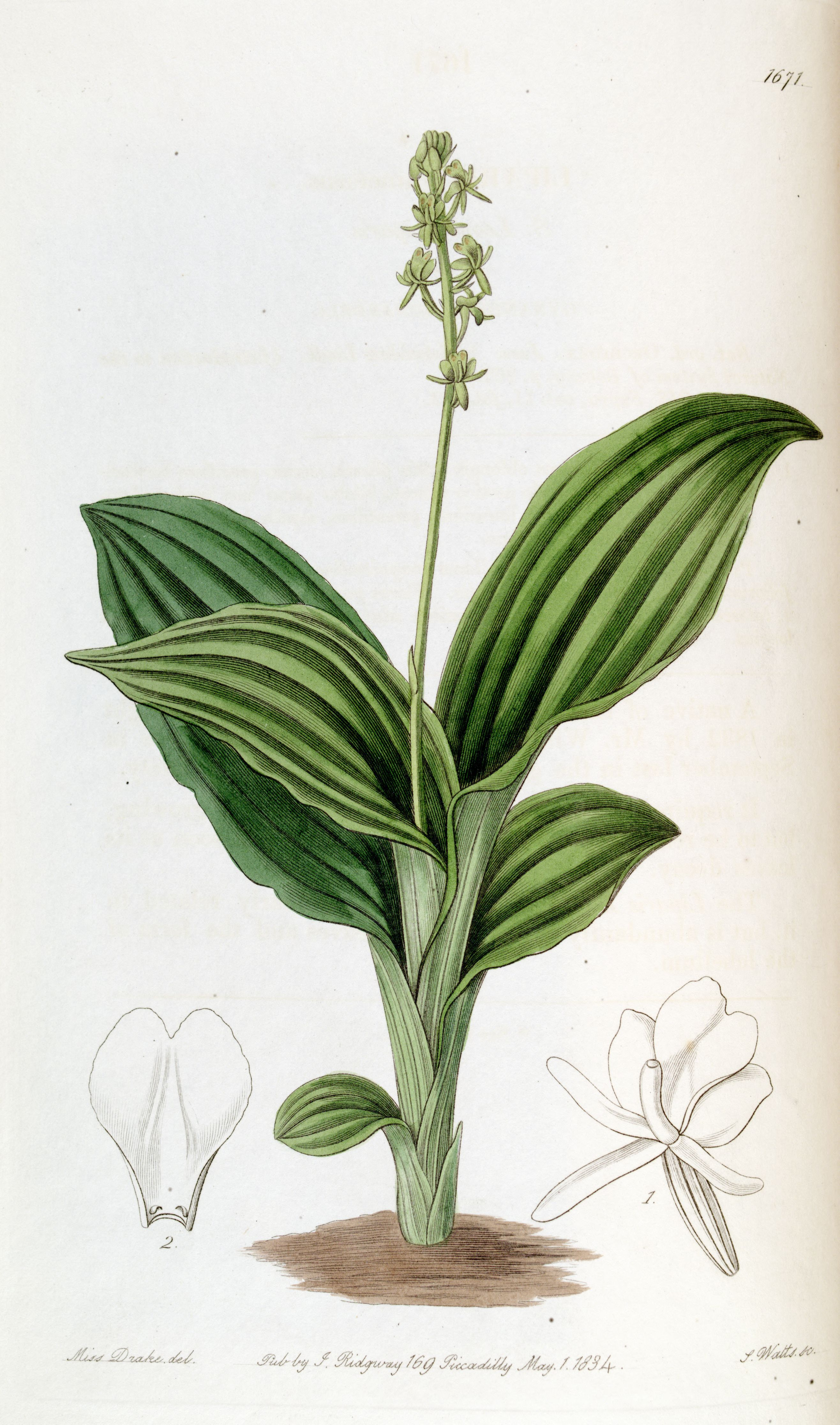

Scientific classification
- Kingdom: Plantae
- Clade: Tracheophytes
- Clade: Angiosperms
- Clade: Monocots
- Order: Asparagales
- Family: Orchidaceae
- Subfamily: Epidendroideae
- Subtribe: Malaxidinae
- Genus: Liparis
- Species: L. nervosa

Binomial name
- Liparis nervosa (Thunb.) Lindl.

Synonyms
- Ophrys nervosa Thunb. in J.A.Murray (basionym); Epidendrum nervosum (Thunb.) Thunb.; Cymbidium nervosum (Thunb.) Sw.; Malaxis nervosa (Thunb.) Sw.; Iebine nervosa (Thunb.) Raf.; Sturmia nervosa (Thunb.) Rchb.f.; Leptorkis nervosa (Thunb.) Kuntze; Diteilis nervosa (Thunb.) M.A.Clem. & D.L.Jones

= Liparis nervosa =

Species of orchid

Liparis nervosa is a species of orchid found in the Tropics of Asia, Africa and America. It is a terrestrial species that grows in woodlands and grasslands.

== Toxicity ==
Liparis nervosa contains tumorigenic pyrrolizidine alkaloids.
