= Liparis bautingensis =

Conservation status
- Endangered (IUCN 3.1)

Scientific classification
- Kingdom: Plantae
- Clade: Tracheophytes
- Clade: Angiosperms
- Clade: Monocots
- Order: Asparagales
- Family: Orchidaceae
- Subfamily: Epidendroideae
- Genus: Liparis
- Species: L. bautingensis

Binomial name
- Liparis bautingensis Tang & F.T.Wang

Species of orchid

Liparis bautingensis is a species of plant in the family Orchidaceae. It is endemic to the Hainan region of southern China.

Liparis bautingensis is listed as an endangered species.
