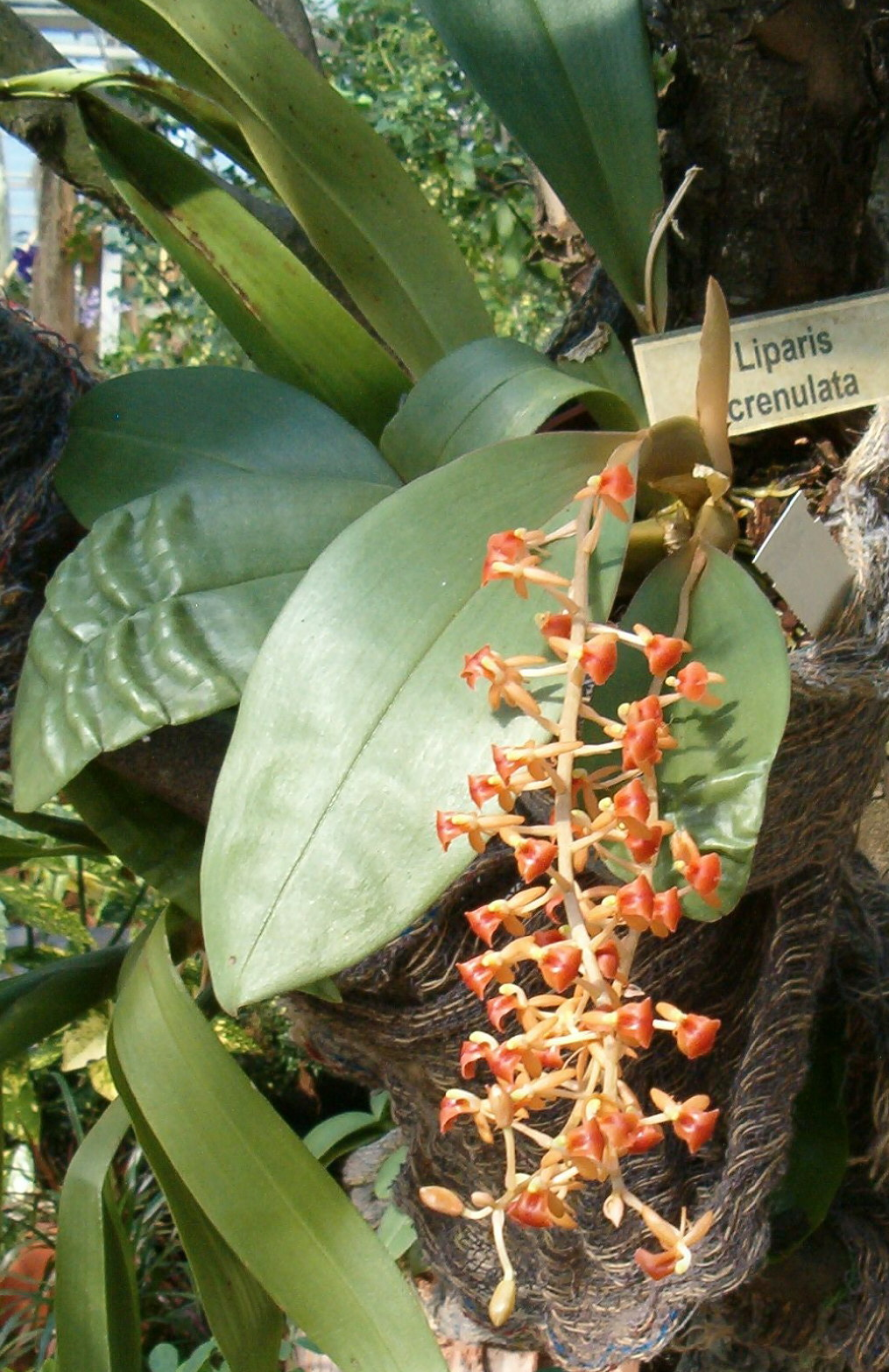

Scientific classification
- Kingdom: Plantae
- Clade: Tracheophytes
- Clade: Angiosperms
- Clade: Monocots
- Order: Asparagales
- Family: Orchidaceae
- Subfamily: Epidendroideae
- Subtribe: Malaxidinae
- Genus: Liparis
- Species: L. crenulata

Binomial name
- Liparis crenulata (Blume) Lindl.

Synonyms
- Malaxis crenulata Blume (basionym); Leptorkis crenulata (Blume) Kuntze

= Liparis crenulata =

Species of orchid

Liparis crenulata is a species of orchid endemic to Sumatra and Java.
