= Liparis hostifolia =

Scientific classification
- Kingdom: Plantae
- Clade: Tracheophytes
- Clade: Angiosperms
- Clade: Monocots
- Order: Asparagales
- Family: Orchidaceae
- Subfamily: Epidendroideae
- Genus: Liparis
- Species: L. hostifolia

Binomial name
- Liparis hostifolia (Koidz.) Koidz. ex Nakai

Species of orchid

Liparis hostifolia is a species of flowering plant in the family Orchidaceae, native to the Bonin Islands and the Volcano Islands, both belonging to Japan.
