= Liparis simmondsii =

Coastal sprite orchid

Scientific classification
- Kingdom: Plantae
- Clade: Tracheophytes
- Clade: Angiosperms
- Clade: Monocots
- Order: Asparagales
- Family: Orchidaceae
- Subfamily: Epidendroideae
- Subtribe: Malaxidinae
- Genus: Liparis
- Species: L. simmondsii

Binomial name
- Liparis simmondsii F.M.Bailey

Synonyms
- Diteilis simmondsii (F.M.Bailey) M.A.Clem. & D.L.Jones

Species of orchid

Liparis simmondsii, commonly known as coastal sprite orchid, is a plant in the orchid family and is endemic to Queensland. It is a terrestrial orchid with two or three egg-shaped leaves and between three and fifteen deep reddish purple flowers with a green column. It grows in near-coastal rainforest.

== Description ==
Liparis simmondsii is a terrestrial herb with between two and four curved, tapering stems, each 60–80 mm (2–3 in) and 7–10 mm (0.3–0.4 in) wide. Each stem has two or three egg-shaped, pleated leaves 80–120 mm (3–5 in) long and 40–60 mm (1.6–2.4 in) wide with wavy edges on a stalk up to 20 mm (0.8 in) long. Between three and fifteen deep reddish purple flowers, 8–12 mm (0.3–0.5 in) long and 10–15 mm (0.4–0.6 in) wide are borne on a flowering stem 150–250 mm (6–10 in) long. The dorsal sepal is 9–11 mm (0.35–0.43 in) long, about 3 mm (0.1 in) wide and the lateral sepals are a similar length, about 4 mm (0.2 in) wide with their tips twisted. The petals are also a similar length but only about 1 mm (0.04 in) wide. The labellum is 8–9 mm (0.31–0.35 in) long and 6–7 mm (0.2–0.3 in) wide with a square-cut or rounded tip and turns sharply downwards. The column is green. Flowering occurs between December and February.

== Taxonomy and naming ==
Liparis simmondsii was first formally described in 1891 by Frederick Manson Bailey and the description was published in the Department of Agriculture Queensland, Botany Bulletin. The specific epithet (simmondsii) honours John Howard Simmonds.

== Distribution and habitat ==
Coastal sprite orchid grows in coastal rainforest between Fraser Island and Maroochydore. There is a doubtful record from the upper Brunswick River in northern New South Wales.
