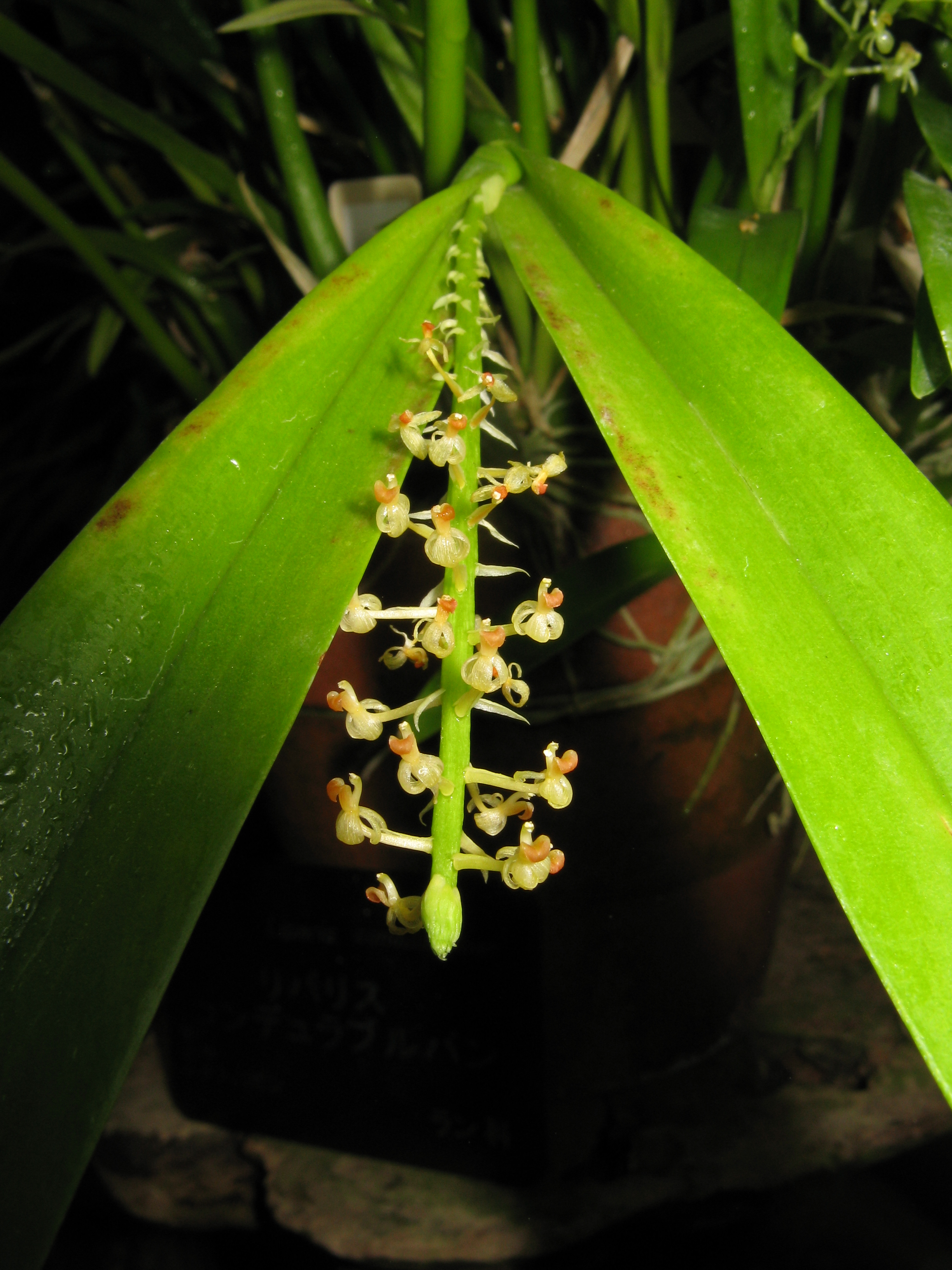
- In the Osaka Prefectural Flowers Garden

Scientific classification
- Kingdom: Plantae
- Clade: Tracheophytes
- Clade: Angiosperms
- Clade: Monocots
- Order: Asparagales
- Family: Orchidaceae
- Subfamily: Epidendroideae
- Subtribe: Malaxidinae
- Genus: Liparis
- Species: L. condylobulbon

Binomial name
- Liparis condylobulbon Rchb.f.

Synonyms
- List: Blepharoglossum condylobulbon (Rchb.f.) L.Li; Cestichis condylobulbon (Rchb.f.) M.A.Clem. & D.L.Jones; Leptorkis condylobulbon (Rchb.f.) Kuntze; Stichorkis condylobulbon (Rchb.f.) Marg., Szlach. & Kulak; Blepharoglossum riparium (J.J.Sm.) Ormerod & Juswara; Cestichis clemensiae Ames; Cestichis persimilis (Schltr.) M.A.Clem. & D.L.Jones; Cestichis vestita Ames; Gyrostachys nesophila (Rchb.f.) Kuntze; Liparis amboinensis (J.J.Sm.) J.J.Sm. nom. illeg.; Liparis clemensiae (Ames) Ames; Liparis confusa J.J.Sm.; Liparis confusa var. amboinensis J.J.Sm.; Liparis confusa var. latifolia J.J.Sm.; Liparis confusa var. papuana J.J.Sm.; Liparis dolichopoda Hayata; Liparis nesophila Rchb.f.; Liparis persimilis Schltr.; Liparis riparia J.J.Sm.; Liparis savaiiensis H.Fleischm. & Rech.; Liparis treubii J.J.Sm.; Stichorkis persimilis (Schltr.) Marg., Szlach. & Kulak

= Liparis condylobulbon =

Tapered sphinx orchid

Species of orchid

Liparis condylobulbon, commonly known as tapered sphinx orchid or 细茎羊耳蒜 (xi jing yang er suan) is a plant in the orchid family. It is an epiphytic or lithophytic orchid with crowded, glossy green, cylinder-shaped pseudobulbs, each with two linear to lance-shaped leaves and between fifteen and thirty five pale green to cream-coloured flowers with an orange labellum. This orchid usually grows on trees and rocks in rainforest from Taiwan and Indochina to the south-west Pacific.

== Description ==
Liparis condylobulbon is an epiphytic or lithophytic, clump-forming herb with crowded, glossy green, cylinder-shaped pseudobulbs 80–150 mm (3.1–5.9 in) long and 10–20 mm (0.4–0.8 in) wide. Each pseudobulb has two thin, linear to lance-shaped leaves 80–200 mm (3.1–7.9 in) and 15–22 mm (0.6–0.9 in) wide. Between fifteen and thirty five pale green to cream-coloured flowers, 3.5–4.5 mm (0.14–0.18 in) long and 4–5 mm (0.16–0.20 in) wide are borne on a stiff flowering stem 70–150 mm (2.8–5.9 in) long. The sepals are 2.5–3 mm (0.098–0.12 in) long and about 1 mm (0.04 in) wide, the petals a similar length but narrower. The labellum is orange, about 3 mm (0.12 in) long and 2 mm (0.079 in) wide with a notched tip. Flowering occurs between December and August.

== Taxonomy and naming ==
Liparis condylobulbon was first formally described in 1862 by Heinrich Gustav Reichenbach who published the description in Hamburger Garten- und Blumenzeitung.

== Distribution and habitat ==
Tapered sphinx orchid grows on trees and rocks in rainforest. It is found in Taiwan, Myanmar, Thailand, Vietnam, Borneo, Java, the Lesser Sunda Islands, the Maluku Islands, the Philippines, Sulawesi, Sumatra, New Guinea, the Solomon Islands, Queensland, Australia, Fiji, New Caledonia, Samoa, Vanuatu, the Santa Cruz Islands and the Wallis and Futuna Islands. In Australia, it occurs on the Iron and McIlwraith Ranges.
