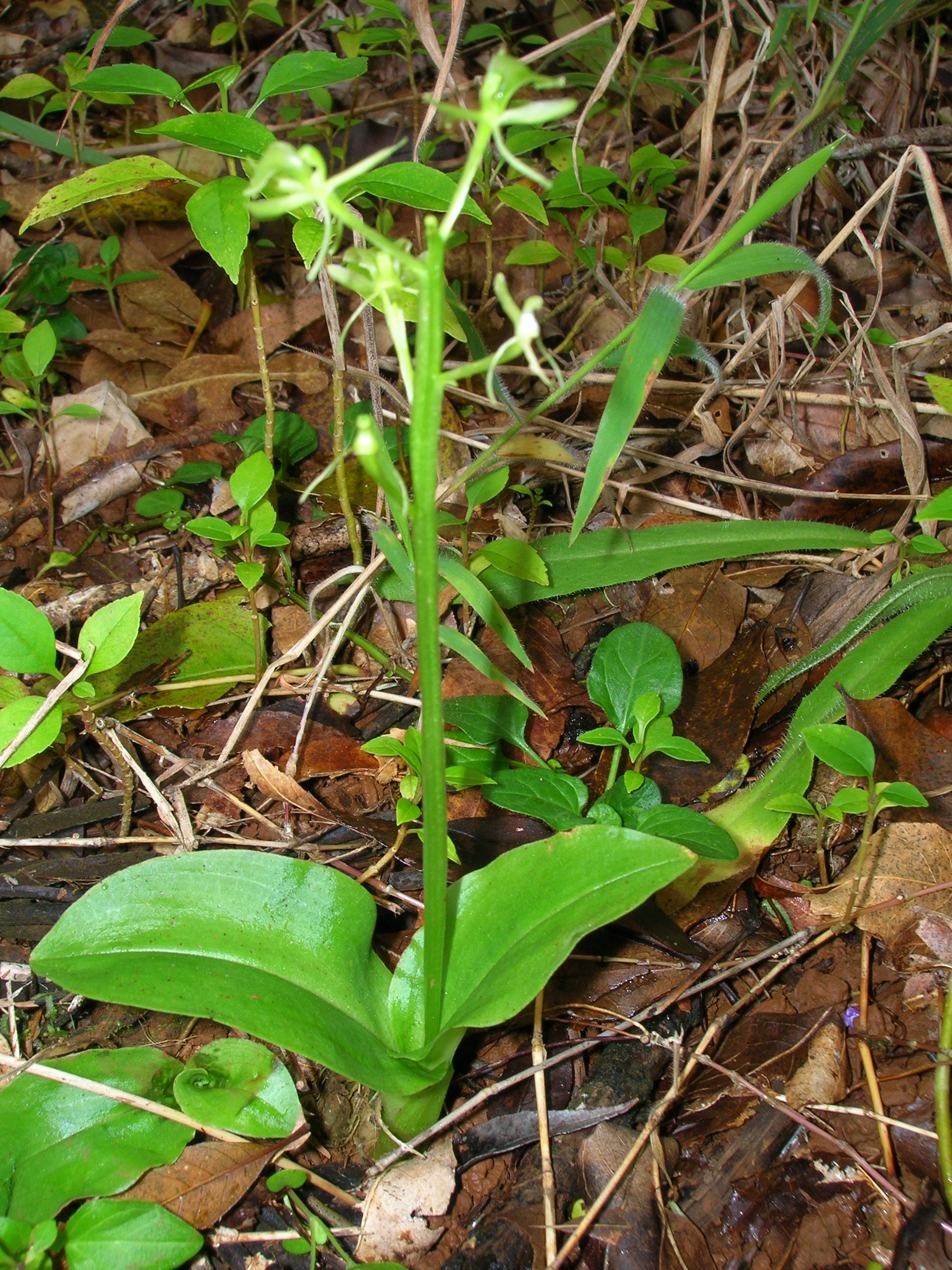

Scientific classification
- Kingdom: Plantae
- Clade: Tracheophytes
- Clade: Angiosperms
- Clade: Monocots
- Order: Asparagales
- Family: Orchidaceae
- Subfamily: Epidendroideae
- Subtribe: Malaxidinae
- Genus: Liparis
- Species: L. hawaiensis

Binomial name
- Liparis hawaiensis H.Mann

Synonyms
- Leptorkis hawaiensis (H.Mann) Kuntze

= Liparis hawaiensis =

Species of orchid

Liparis hawaiensis is a species of flowering plant in the family Orchidaceae. It is sometimes referred to by the common name Hawai'i widelip orchid, This orchid is endemic to the Hawaiian Islands.
