= Liparis goodyeroides =

Conservation status
- Critically Endangered (IUCN 2.3)

Scientific classification
- Kingdom: Plantae
- Clade: Tracheophytes
- Clade: Angiosperms
- Clade: Monocots
- Order: Asparagales
- Family: Orchidaceae
- Subfamily: Epidendroideae
- Genus: Liparis
- Species: L. goodyeroides

Binomial name
- Liparis goodyeroides Schltr.

Species of orchid

Liparis goodyeroides is a species of plant in the family Orchidaceae. It is found in Cameroon and Nigeria. Its natural habitat is subtropical or tropical dry forests. It is threatened by habitat loss.
