= Liparis swenssonii =

Northern tom cats

Scientific classification
- Kingdom: Plantae
- Clade: Tracheophytes
- Clade: Angiosperms
- Clade: Monocots
- Order: Asparagales
- Family: Orchidaceae
- Subfamily: Epidendroideae
- Subtribe: Malaxidinae
- Genus: Liparis
- Species: L. swenssonii

Binomial name
- Liparis swenssonii F.M.Bailey

Synonyms
- Cestichis swenssonii (F.M.Bailey) M.A.Clem. & D.L.Jones; Liparis reflexa var. parviflora Nicholls

Species of orchid

Liparis swenssonii, commonly known as northern tom cats, is a plant in the orchid family and is endemic to far eastern Australia. It is a lithophytic orchid with one or two leaves and up to thirty or more greenish, strongly scented flowers. It grows on rocks or in rocky soil in moist forests.

== Description ==
Liparis swenssonii is a lithophytic, rarely a terrestrial herb with more or less oval pseudobulbs 20–40 mm (0.8–2 in) and 15–30 mm (0.6–1 in) wide. There are one or two linear to lance-shaped leaves, 100–300 mm (4–10 in), 1–2.5 mm (0.04–0.1 in) wide and folded lengthwise. Between five and thirty or more greenish, unpleasantly scented flowers, 7–9 mm (0.3–0.4 in) long and 7–10 mm (0.3–0.4 in) wide are borne on a flowering stem 100–250 mm (4–10 in) long. The sepals are 7–9 mm (0.3–0.4 in) long, about 2 mm (0.08 in) wide and the petals are slightly shorter and narrower. The sepals and petals spread widely apart from each other. The labellum is 6–8 mm (0.2–0.3 in) long, about 3 mm (0.1 in) wide with two parallel orange or yellow ridges along its mid-line and a deep channel at its base. Flowering occurs between February and July.

== Taxonomy and naming ==
Liparis swenssonii was first formally described in 1906 by Frederick Manson Bailey and the description was published in the Department of Agriculture Queensland, Botany Bulletin. The collection was based on a specimen collected by Carl Swensson.

== Distribution and habitat ==
Northern tom cats grows on rocks, sometimes in rocky soil in rainforest or moist open forest in coastal ranges between the Clarence River in New South Wales and Gympie in Queensland.
