= Liparis fissipetala =

Scientific classification
- Kingdom: Plantae
- Clade: Tracheophytes
- Clade: Angiosperms
- Clade: Monocots
- Order: Asparagales
- Family: Orchidaceae
- Subfamily: Epidendroideae
- Genus: Liparis
- Species: L. fissipetala

Binomial name
- Liparis fissipetala Finet

Synonyms
- Ypsilorchis fissipetala (Finet) Z.J.Liu, S.C.Chen & L.J.Chen; Platystyliparis fissipetala (Finet) Marg.

Genus of plants

Liparis fissipetala is a species of orchid native to southern China (Chongqing and Yunnan). It has also been considered to be the sole species in the genus Ypsilorchis.
