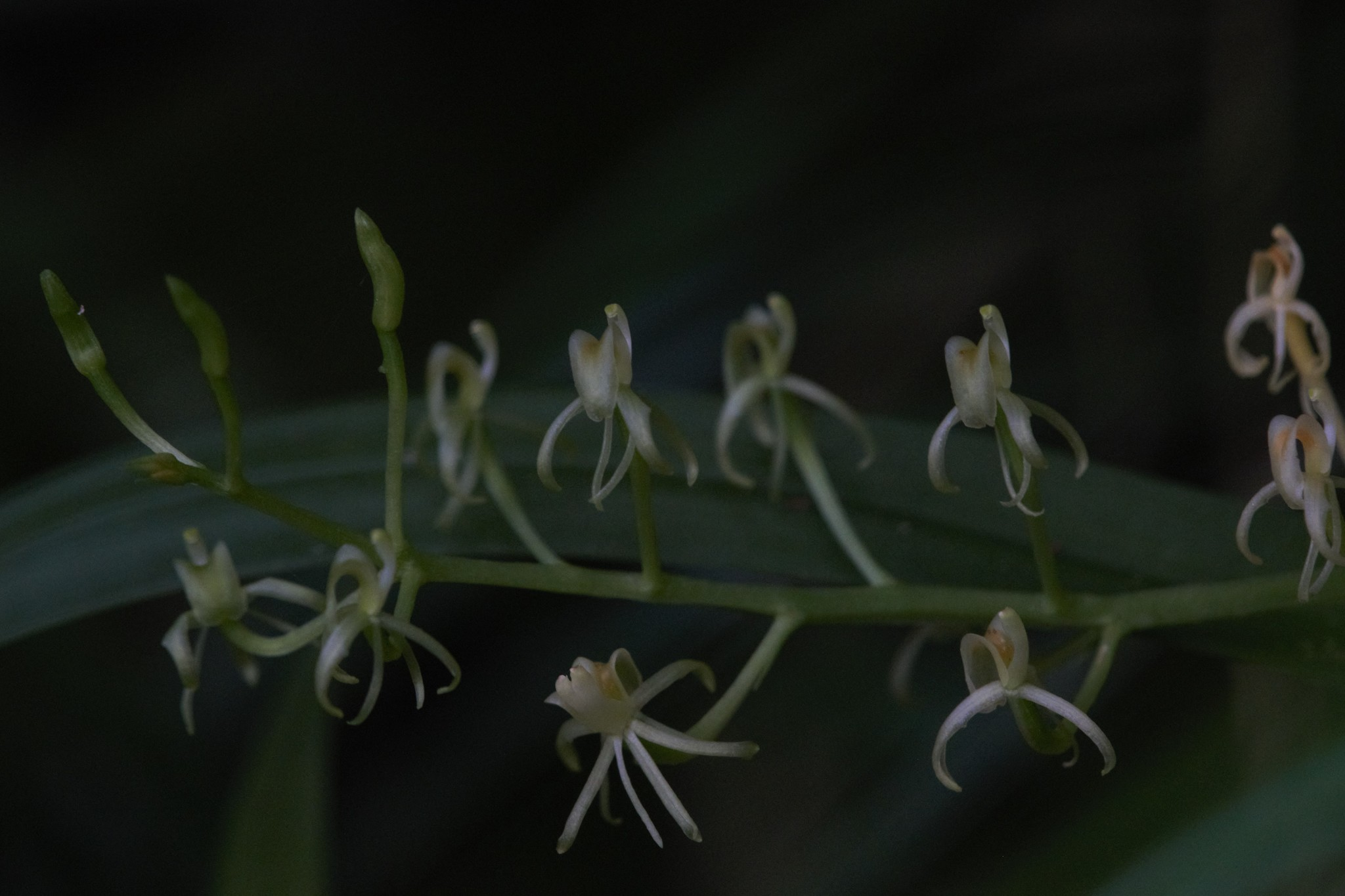

Scientific classification
- Kingdom: Plantae
- Clade: Tracheophytes
- Clade: Angiosperms
- Clade: Monocots
- Order: Asparagales
- Family: Orchidaceae
- Subfamily: Epidendroideae
- Subtribe: Malaxidinae
- Genus: Liparis
- Species: L. fleckeri

Binomial name
- Liparis fleckeri Nicholls

Synonyms
- Cestichis fleckeri (Nicholls) M.A.Clem. & D.L.Jones

= Liparis fleckeri =

Slender sphinx orchid

Species of orchid

Liparis fleckeri, commonly known as slender sphinx orchid, is a plant in the orchid family and is endemic to Queensland. It is an epiphytic or lithophytic orchid with two thin leaves and up to twenty pale green or whitish flowers. It grows in rainforest at altitudes of 900 m (3,000 ft) or more in tropical far North Queensland.

== Description ==
Liparis fleckeri is an epiphytic or lithophytic herb with fleshy, dark green pseudobulbs 25–35 mm (0.98–1.4 in) and 20–30 mm (0.8–1 in) wide. There are two thin, dark green, linear to lance-shaped leaves 15–35 mm (0.6–1 in) long and about 2 mm (0.08 in) wide. Between five and twenty pale green or whitish flowers, 10–12 mm (0.4–0.5 in) long and 8–10 mm (0.3–0.4 in) wide are borne on an arching flowering stem 150–250 mm (6–10 in) long. The sepals are 8–9 mm (0.3–0.4 in) long, about 2 mm (0.08 in) wide and the petals are a similar length but only about 0.2 mm (0.008 in) wide. The sepals and petals are tapered and curve downwards. The labellum is 6–8 mm (0.2–0.3 in) long, 3–4 mm (0.1–0.2 in) wide with two orange calli. Flowering occurs between May and August.

== Taxonomy and naming ==
Liparis fleckeri was first formally described in 1938 by William Henry Nicholls from a specimen collected by Hugo Flecker on Mount Bellenden Ker. The description was published in The North Queensland Naturalist, the specific epithet (fleckeri) honouring Hugo Flecker.

== Distribution and habitat ==
Mountain sprite orchid grows on rocks and trees in rainforest at altitudes between 900 and 1,600 m (3,000 and 5,000 ft) between Cedar Bay National Park and Tully.
