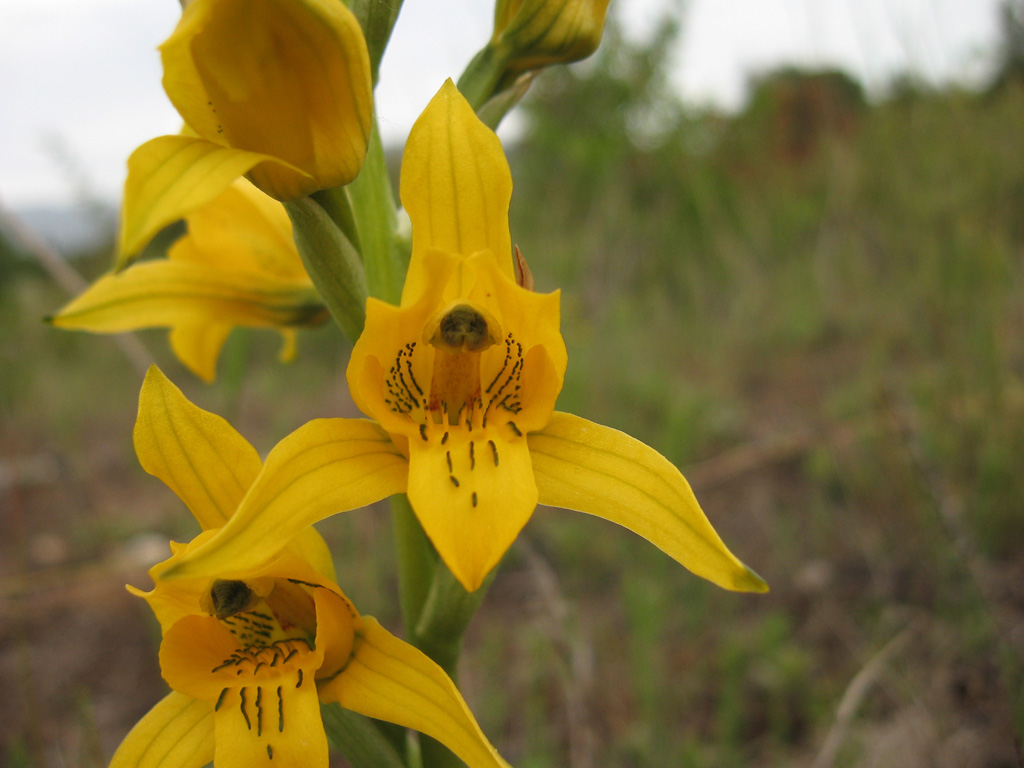
- Chloraea gavilu

Scientific classification
- Kingdom: Plantae
- Clade: Tracheophytes
- Clade: Angiosperms
- Clade: Monocots
- Order: Asparagales
- Family: Orchidaceae
- Subfamily: Orchidoideae
- Tribe: Cranichideae
- Subtribe: Chloraeinae

Genera
- Bipinnula; Chloraea; Gavilea

Synonyms
- Chloraeeae

= Chloraeinae =

Subtribe of orchids

Chloraeinae is an orchid subtribe in the subfamily Orchidoideae.
