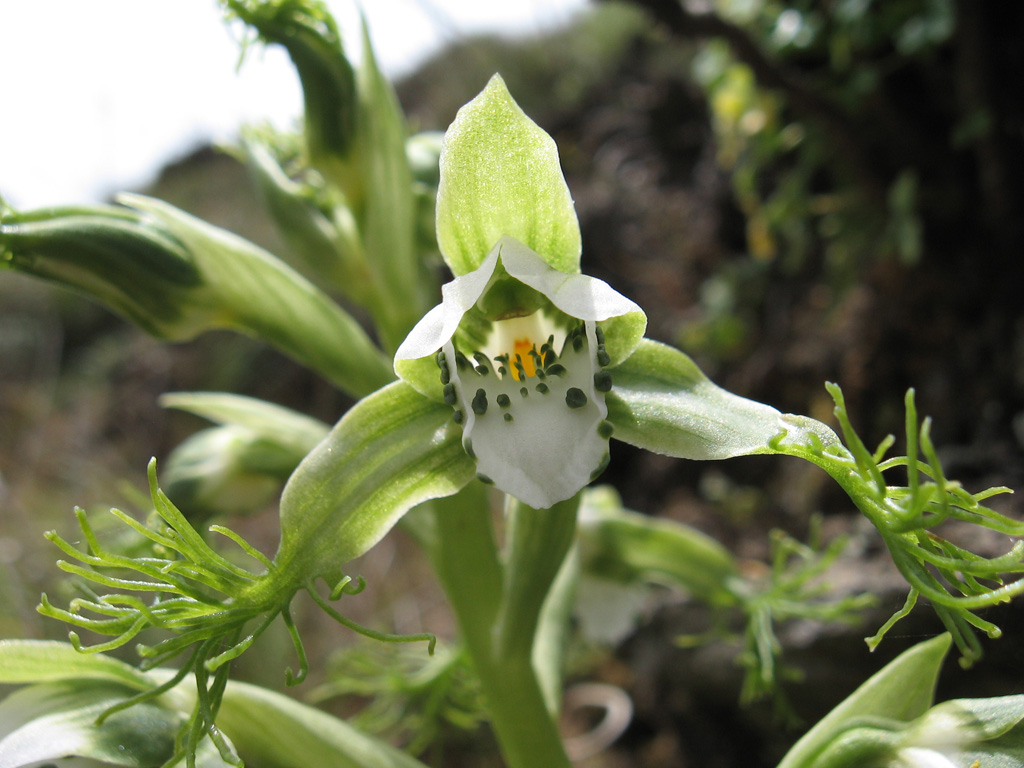
- Bipinnula fimbriata

Scientific classification
- Kingdom: Plantae
- Clade: Embryophytes
- Clade: Tracheophytes
- Clade: Spermatophytes
- Clade: Angiosperms
- Clade: Monocots
- Order: Asparagales
- Family: Orchidaceae
- Subfamily: Orchidoideae
- Tribe: Cranichideae
- Subtribe: Chloraeinae
- Genus: Bipinnula; Comm. ex Juss. 1789

Synonyms
- Geoblasta Barb.Rodr.; Jouyella Szlach.

= Bipinnula =

Genus of flowering plants

Bipinnula is a genus of flowering plants from the orchid family, Orchidaceae. It is native to South America (Brazil, Argentina, Uruguay, Chile).

== Species ==
Accepted species as of May 2014:

Image	Species	Distribution
	Bipinnula biplumata (L.f.) Rchb.f.	Brazil, Argentina, Uruguay
	Bipinnula fimbriata (Poepp.) I.M.Johnst.	Chile
	Bipinnula gibertii Rchb.f.	Uruguay, Rio Grande do Sul
	Bipinnula montana Arechav.	Uruguay, Rio Grande do Sul
	Bipinnula penicillata (Rchb.f.) Cisternas & Salazar	Brazil, Argentina, Uruguay
	Bipinnula plumosa Lindl.	Chile
	Bipinnula polysyka Kraenzl.	Argentina, Uruguay
	Bipinnula taltalensis I.M.Johnst.	Antofagasta
	Bipinnula volkmannii Kraenzl.	Chile

== See also ==
- List of Orchidaceae genera
