= Liparis sanamalabarica =

Scientific classification
- Kingdom: Plantae
- Clade: Tracheophytes
- Clade: Angiosperms
- Clade: Monocots
- Order: Asparagales
- Family: Orchidaceae
- Subfamily: Epidendroideae
- Genus: Liparis
- Species: L. sanamalabarica

Binomial name
- Liparis sanamalabarica P.M.Salim

Species of orchid

Liparis sanamalabarica is a species of orchid native to India. It is endemic in southern Western Ghats in Wayanad district.

L. sanamalabarica occasionally grows on trees and rarely on rocks. Its flowering and fruiting time is between August and October.

The epithet sanamalabarica refers to the Malabar region ('sana' in Arabic means beautiful).
