= Liparis petricola =

Mountain sprite orchid

Scientific classification
- Kingdom: Plantae
- Clade: Tracheophytes
- Clade: Angiosperms
- Clade: Monocots
- Order: Asparagales
- Family: Orchidaceae
- Subfamily: Epidendroideae
- Genus: Liparis
- Species: L. petricola

Binomial name
- Liparis petricola (D.L.Jones & B.Gray) Bostock

Synonyms
- Diteilis petricola D.L.Jones & B.Gray

Species of orchid

Liparis petricola, commonly known as the mountain sprite orchid, is a plant in the orchid family and is endemic to Queensland. It is a terrestrial orchid with two or three egg-shaped leaves and between three and fifteen deep reddish purple flowers with a green column. It grows in rainforest in tropical far North Queensland.

== Description ==
Liparis petricola is a terrestrial herb with three or four underground pseudobulbs. There are two or three thin, dark green pleated, egg-shaped leaves 80–120 mm (3–5 in) long and 40–60 mm (2–2 in) wide with five obvious veins and wavy edges. Between three and fifteen deep reddish purple flowers, 8–12 mm (0.3–0.5 in) long and 10–15 mm (0.39–0.59 in) wide are borne on a purplish flowering stem 150–250 mm (6–10 in) long. The dorsal sepal is 9–11 mm (0.4–0.4 in) long, about 3 mm (0.1 in) wide and the lateral sepals are a similar length and about 4 mm (0.2 in) wide with their tips twisted. The petals are also a similar length but only about 1 mm (0.04 in) wide. The labellum is egg-shaped with the narrower end towards the base, a channelled base and irregular edges. It is 8–9 mm (0.31–0.35 in) long and 6–7 mm (0.2–0.3 in) wide and has a green column. Flowering occurs between October and December.

== Taxonomy and naming ==
The mountain sprite orchid was first formally described in 2006 by David Jones and Bruce Gray who gave it the name Diteilis petricola and published the description in Australian Orchid Research. In 2008, Peter Dundas Bostock changed the name to Liparis petricola. The specific epithet (petricola) is derived from the Ancient Greek word petra meaning "rock" or "stone" and the suffix -cola meaning "dweller" or "inhabitant".

== Distribution and habitat ==
Liparis petricola grows in rainforest, often in leaf litter on large granite boulders and is found between Kuranda and the Kirrama National Park.
