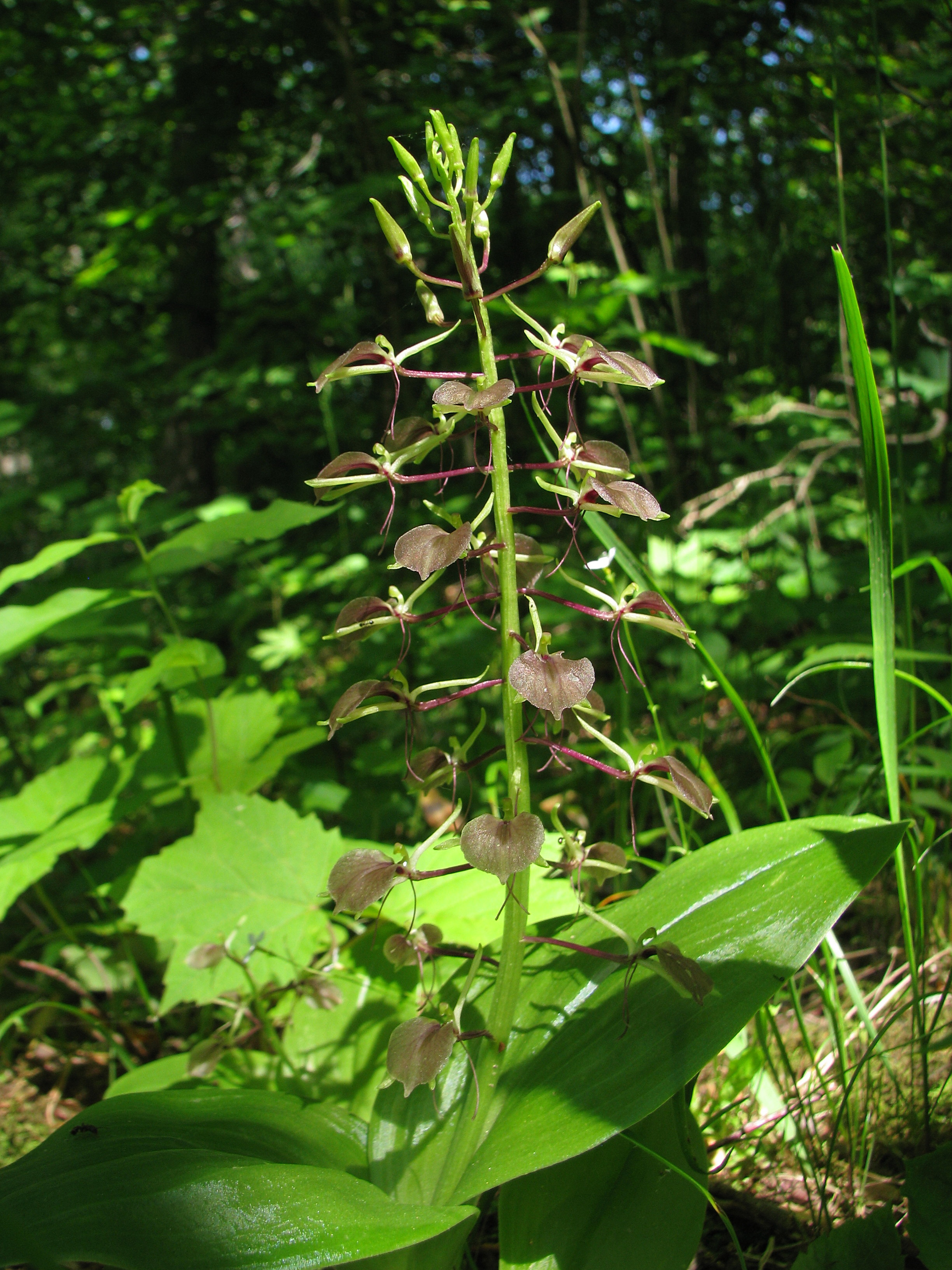

Scientific classification
- Kingdom: Plantae
- Clade: Tracheophytes
- Clade: Angiosperms
- Clade: Monocots
- Order: Asparagales
- Family: Orchidaceae
- Subfamily: Epidendroideae
- Subtribe: Malaxidinae
- Genus: Liparis
- Species: L. liliifolia

Binomial name
- Liparis liliifolia (L.) Rich. ex Lindl.

Synonyms
- List: Ophrys liliifolia L.; Cymbidium liliifolium (L.) Sw.; Malaxis liliifolia (L.) Sw.; Mesoptera liliifolia (L.) Raf.; Achroanthes liliifolia (L.) Raf.; Sturmia liliifolia (L.) Rchb.f. in W.G.Walpers; Leptorkis liliifolia (L.) Kuntze; Ophrys trifolia Walter; Ophrys caroliniana Raeusch.; Anistylis convallaria Raf.; Liparis liliifolia f. viridiflora Wadmond

= Liparis liliifolia =

Species of plant (orchid)

Liparis liliifolia, known as the brown widelip orchid, lily-leaved twayblade, large twayblade, and mauve sleekwort, is a species of orchid native to eastern Canada and the eastern United States. It can be found in a variety of habitats, such as forests, shrublands, thickets, woodlands, and mountains. The orchid is considered globally secure, but it is considered rare or endangered in many northeastern states.

== Description ==
One of the orchid's common names, lily-leaved twayblade, comes from the plant having two connected basal leaves. The leaves are light green, smooth, oval shaped, and have a partial mid-rib. Its delicate flowers are mauve or purple, arranged on a 4–10-inch (100–250 mm) tall stem in a loose cluster, and total up to 31 flowers. The petals and sepals are long, thin, and often droop. Its flowers can be green, but it is a rare occurrence. Each flower has a labellum that is wide, flat, and nearly translucent. The labellum is pale purple and has darker veins. The fruit is smaller than the pedicels. Its seeds can only germinate and grow with a specific mycorrhizal fungus that can be found across its range. It has been debated over decades whether liliifolia should have a single or two consecutive i's, although the correct spelling has now been shown to be liliifolia by botanist Bernard Boivin.

== Distribution and habitat ==
It is native to eastern Canada (Quebec and Ontario) and the eastern United States. In the eastern United States, it is found in the Appalachians, Ozarks, the Great Lakes region, and the Ohio and Upper Mississippi Valleys, but not the southern coastal plains. The orchid's habitat is in forests, shrublands, thickets, woodlands, and mountains. The highest altitude that the plant can be found in mountains is 4,200 feet (1,300 m). While the plant is considered globally secure, it is rare or endangered in many northeastern states due to declining populations. It can be commonly found throughout much of its range.

== Ecology ==
The plant is pollinated by flies, potentially including the species Pegoplata juvenilis. It has been speculated that unspecialized insects have pollinated the orchid. The North American Orchid Center has stated that it is possible for insects with either long legs or mouthparts to pollinate its flowers. Threats to the orchid include flooding caused by beavers, swamp habitat being drained, and insecticides that kill the flies which pollinate the plant.
