= Liparis angustilabris =

Twisted sphinx orchid

Scientific classification
- Kingdom: Plantae
- Clade: Tracheophytes
- Clade: Angiosperms
- Clade: Monocots
- Order: Asparagales
- Family: Orchidaceae
- Subfamily: Epidendroideae
- Subtribe: Malaxidinae
- Genus: Liparis
- Species: L. angustilabris

Binomial name
- Liparis angustilabris (F.Muell.) Blaxell

Synonyms
- Cestichis angustilabris (F.Muell.) M.A.Clem. & D.L.Jones; Liparis cuneilabris F.Muell. nom. inval., pro syn.; Liparis cuneilabris F.Muell. ex Benth. nom. illeg., nom. superfl.; Liparis reflexa var. cuneilabris Ridl.; Sturmia angustilabris F.Muell.; Sturmia cuneilabris Benth. nom. inval., pro syn.

Species of orchid

Liparis angustilabris, commonly known as twisted sphinx orchid, is a plant in the orchid family and is endemic to northern Queensland. It is an epiphytic or lithophytic orchid with tapered pseudobulbs, each with a single linear leaf and up to thirty five pale green to yellowish flowers that have twisted sepals and petals. This orchid grows on trees and rocks in tropical North Queensland.

== Description ==
Liparis angustilabris is an epiphytic or lithophytic herb with crowded, tapered pseudobulbs 300–600 mm (12–24 in), about 20 mm (0.8 in) wide and covered with leaf like bracts when young. Each pseudobulb has a single linear leaf 150–250 mm (5.9–9.8 in), 10–15 mm (0.4–0.6 in) wide. Between fifteen and thirty five pale green to yellowish flowers, 6–8 mm (0.24–0.31 in) long and 2–3 mm (0.079–0.12 in) wide are borne on an often arching flowering stem 150–250 mm (5.9–9.8 in) long. The sepals and petals curve backwards towards the ovary and are about 5–6 mm (0.20–0.24 in) long and about 2 mm (0.08 in) wide. The labellum is 5–6 mm (0.20–0.24 in) long and about 3 mm (0.12 in) wide with two ridges on its midline. Flowering occurs between March and July.

== Taxonomy and naming ==
Twisted sphinx orchid was first formally described in 1864 by Ferdinand von Mueller who gave it the name Sturmia angustilabris and published the description in Fragmenta phytographiae Australiae. The description was based on a collection made by John Dallachy near Rockingham Bay. In 1978, Donald Blaxell changed the name to Liparis angustilabris. The specific epithet (angustilabris) is derived from the Latin word angustus meaning "narrow" and labrum meaning "lip".

== Distribution and habitat ==
Liparis angustilabris grows on trees and rocks in rainforest, especially above 800 m (3,000 ft) rainforest between the Cedar Bay and Paluma Range National Parks.
