= Liparis elegans =

Scientific classification
- Kingdom: Plantae
- Clade: Tracheophytes
- Clade: Angiosperms
- Clade: Monocots
- Order: Asparagales
- Family: Orchidaceae
- Subfamily: Epidendroideae
- Genus: Liparis
- Species: L. elegans

Binomial name
- Liparis elegans Lindl., 1828

Synonyms
- Several, including: Cestichis elegans (Lindl.) M.A.Clem. & D.L.Jones; Leptorchis elegans (Lindl.) Kuntze

Species of orchid

Liparis elegans is a species of orchids. It is found in South East Asia (Indonesia, Papua New Guinea).
