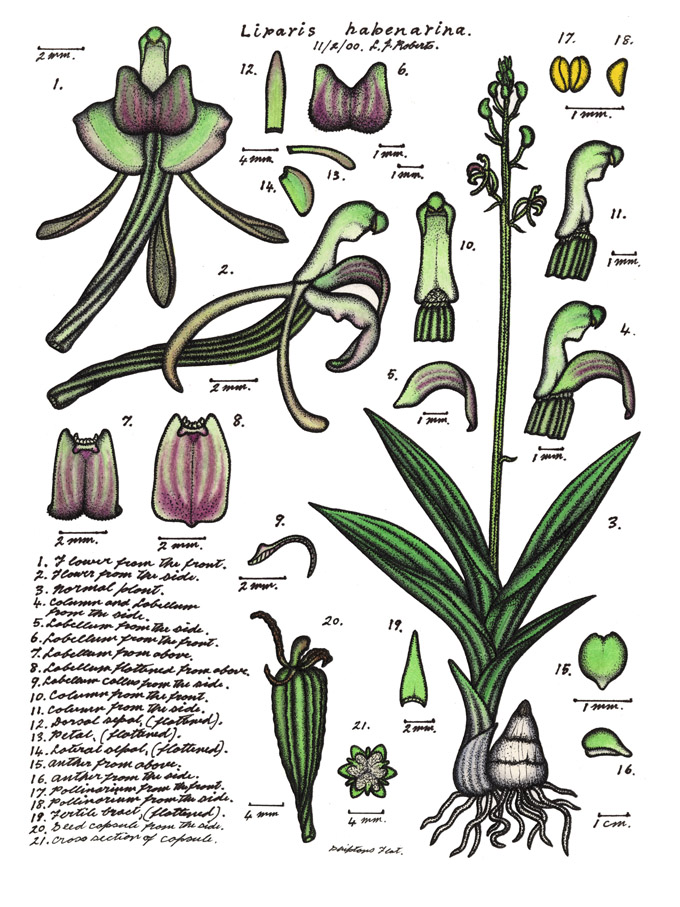
- Illustration of Liparis habenarina by Lewis Roberts

Scientific classification
- Kingdom: Plantae
- Clade: Tracheophytes
- Clade: Angiosperms
- Clade: Monocots
- Order: Asparagales
- Family: Orchidaceae
- Subfamily: Epidendroideae
- Subtribe: Malaxidinae
- Genus: Liparis
- Species: L. habenarina

Binomial name
- Liparis habenarina (F.Muell.) F.Muell. ex Benth.

Synonyms
- Empusa habenarina (F.Muell.)M.A.Clem. & D.L.Jones; Leptorkis habenarina (F.Muell.) Kuntze; Sturmia habenarina F.Muell.; Liparis kenejiae Schltr.

= Liparis habenarina =

Common sphinx orchid

Species of orchid

Liparis habenarina, commonly known as the common sphinx orchid or common hobgoblin orchid, is a plant in the orchid family and is endemic to Australia. It is a deciduous, terrestrial orchid with two or three egg-shaped leaves and between eight and twenty-two brownish to purplish flowers with their lateral sepals joined at the base. It grows in the understorey of near-coastal forests.

== Description ==
Liparis habenarina is a terrestrial, deciduous herb with two underground pseudobulbs, each of which lasts for one season. There are usually three, thin, pleated, egg-shaped leaves 100–250 mm (4–10 in) and 20–40 mm (0.8–2 in) wide with five obvious veins. Between eight and twenty two brownish to purplish flowers, 10–25 mm (0.4–1 in) long and 5–6 mm (0.20–0.24 in) wide are borne on an upright flowering stem 150–600 mm (6–20 in) long. The dorsal sepal is 5–10 mm (0.2–0.4 in) long, 1–2 mm (0.04–0.08 in) wide and turns downward. The lateral sepals are 5–8 mm (0.2–0.3 in) long, 1–3 mm (0.04–0.1 in) wide and joined to each other. The petals are a similar length but only about 1 mm (0.04 in) wide and curve downwards. The labellum is egg-shaped with the narrower end towards the base and curves downwards. It is 4–5 mm (0.16–0.20 in) long and 2–4 mm (0.08–0.2 in) wide with two ridges near its base, a greenish centre and wavy edges. Flowering occurs between January and May.

== Taxonomy and naming ==
The common sphinx orchid was first formally described in 1864 by Ferdinand von Mueller who gave it the name Sturmia habenarina and published the description in Fragmenta phytographiae Australiae. The description was based on a specimen collected near Rockingham Bay by John Dallachy. In the description, von Mueller noted Liparis habenarina as a synonym. In 1873, George Bentham changed the name to Liparis habenarina and published the name change in Flora Australiensis. The specific epithet (habenarina) refers to the similarity of this species to those in the orchid genus Habenaria.

== Distribution and habitat ==
Liparis habenarina grows with grasses in the understorey of forests, usually near the edge of swamps in near-coastal areas. It is found in New South Wales north from Coffs Harbour, in coastal Queensland, the Northern Territory and the Northern Kimberley biogeographic region of Western Australia. Authorities using the name Empusa habenarina list the range as extending to New Guinea and Indonesia.
