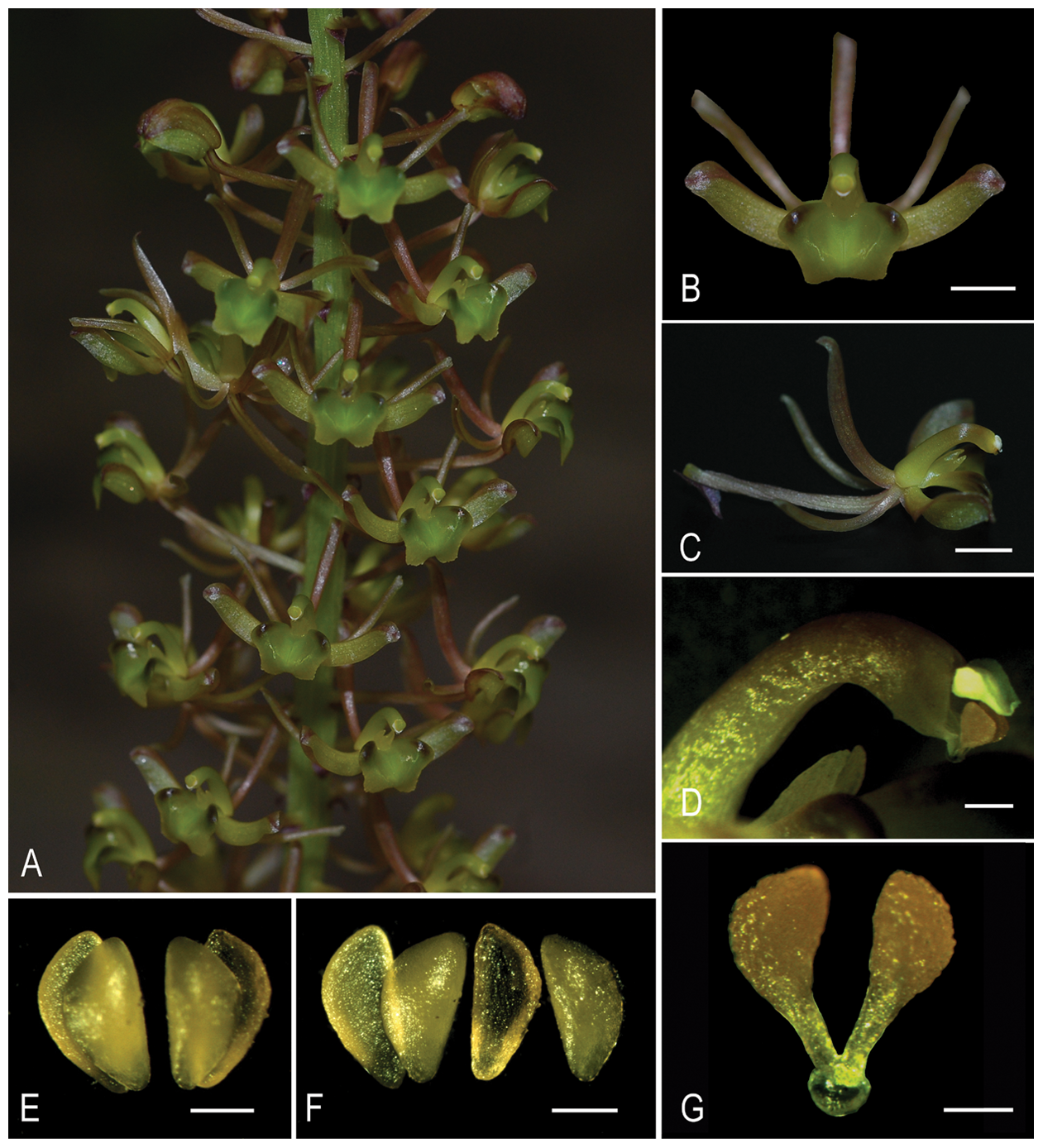

Scientific classification
- Kingdom: Plantae
- Clade: Tracheophytes
- Clade: Angiosperms
- Clade: Monocots
- Order: Asparagales
- Family: Orchidaceae
- Subfamily: Epidendroideae
- Subtribe: Malaxidinae
- Genus: Liparis
- Species: L. pingxiangensis

Binomial name
- Liparis pingxiangensis L.Li & H.F.Yan

= Liparis pingxiangensis =

Species of orchid

Liparis pingxiangensis is a species of orchid discovered in 2013 in Guangxi, China.

== Description ==
It is differentiated from closely related species by its strongly curved column without column wings and its broadly rhombic-elliptic lip with 2 uncinate calli at the base. It also has two pollinia attached by long and prominent caudicles (not stipes), to a distinct sticky disc.

== Distribution, habitat, and ecology ==
Liparis pingxiangensis is a terrestrial orchid. It forms scattered colonies in shady, damp ravines. It occurs in wet to moist soil on steeper slopes. It is found at elevations around 800 m (2,600 ft) in mixed deciduous forest in southwest China's Guangxi Zhuang Autonomous Region. It flowers in the early spring until late April. It has not been observed in fruit.

== Conservation status ==
Liparis pingxiangensis is a rare species occurs in a rather small population (no more than 10 individuals). It is only known from the type collection and a neighboring population. The forest has been experiencing a continuing decline in quality of habitat due to deforestation. Using the International Union for Conservation of Nature (IUCN) Red List categories and criteria, L. pingxiangensis should be treated as critically endangered due to its rarity and the threat of disturbance. More studies at the two nearby localities may shed light on this enigmatic species.
