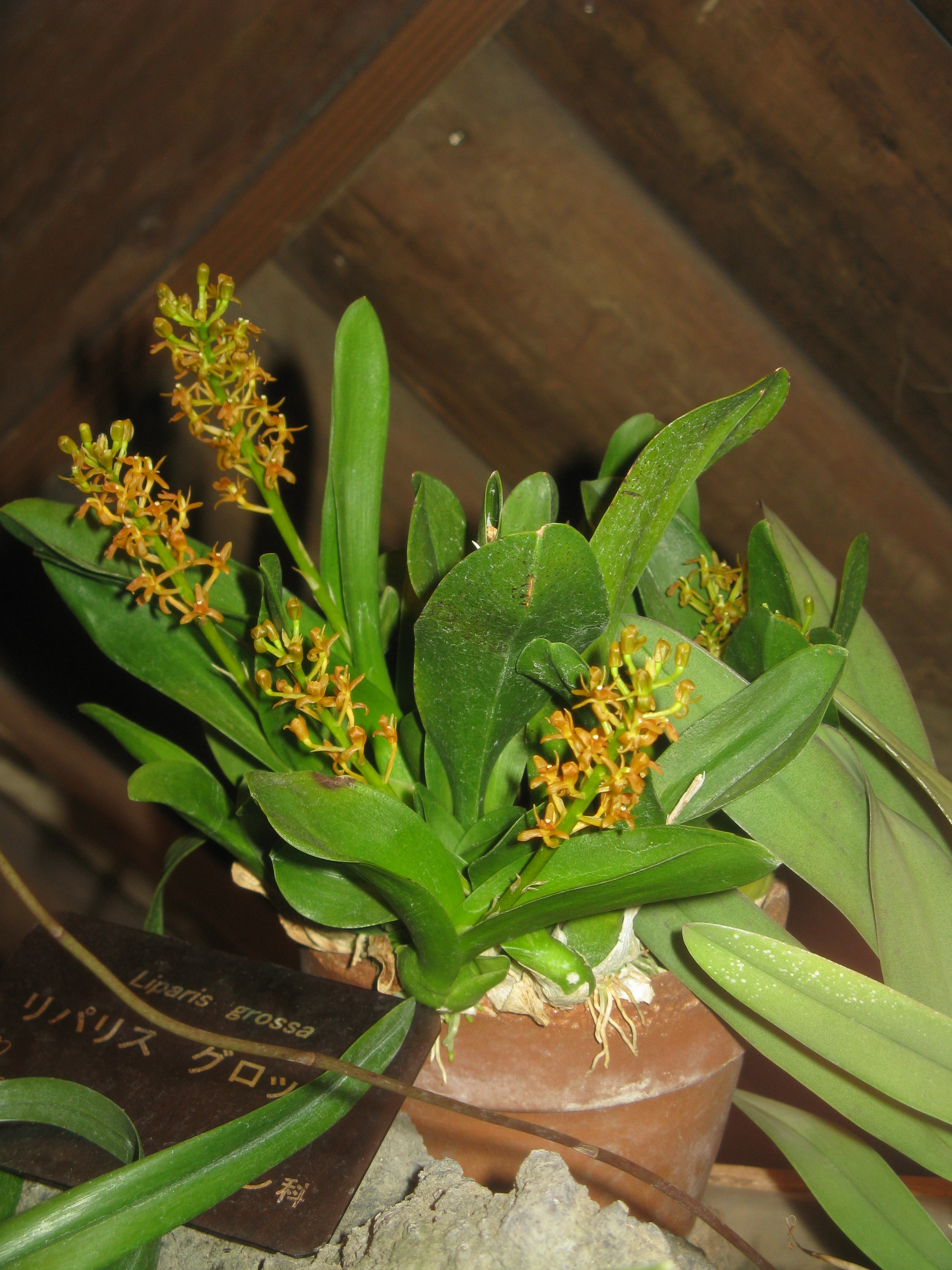
- Potted specimen
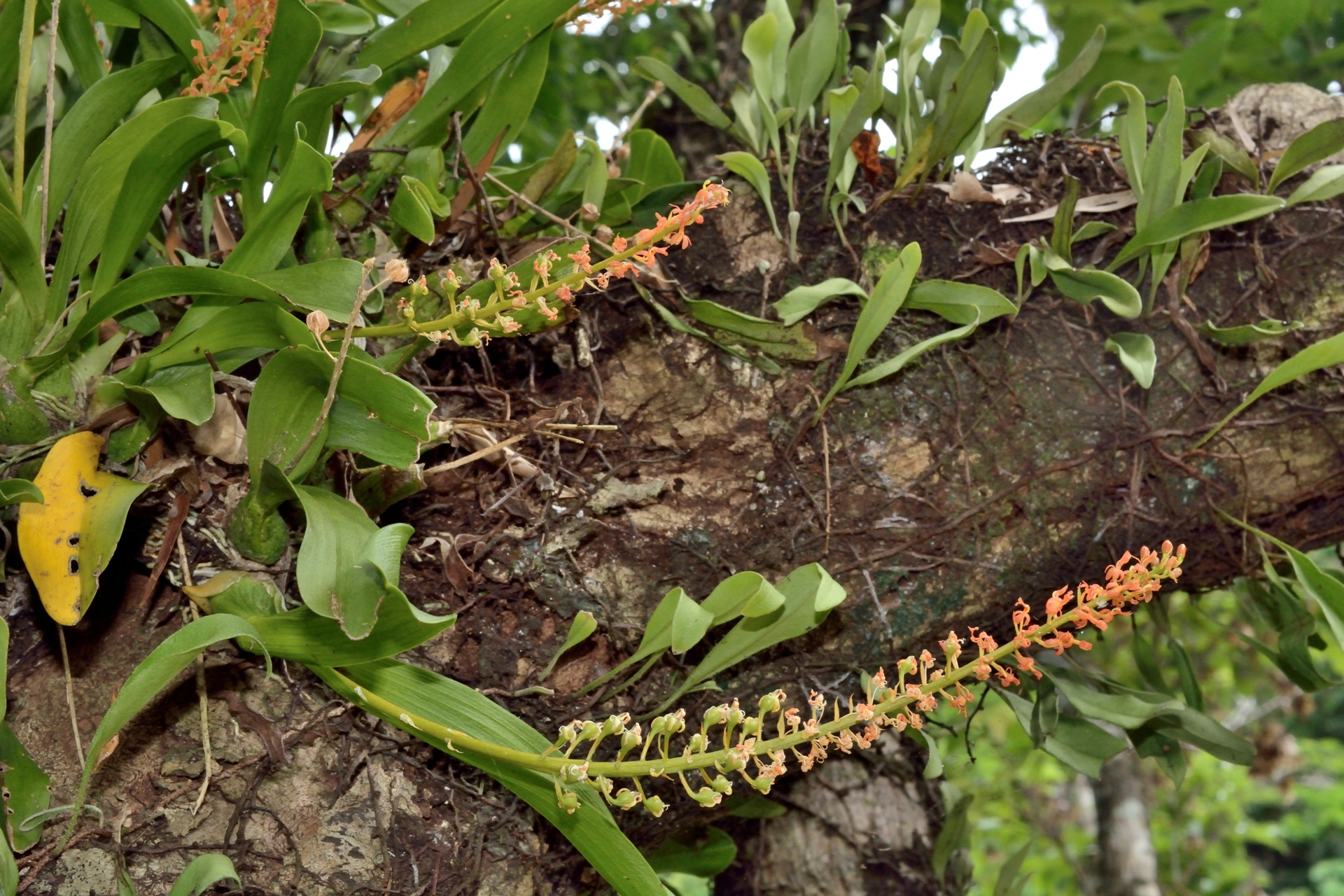
- On a tree

Scientific classification
- Kingdom: Animalia
- Phylum: Chordata
- Class: Actinopterygii
- Order: Perciformes
- Suborder: Cottoidei
- Family: Liparidae
- Genus: Liparis
- Species: L. grossa

Binomial name
- Liparis grossa Rchb.f.

Synonyms
- Blepharoglossum grossum (Rchb.f.) L.Li; Cestichis grossa (Rchb.f.) T.C.Hsu; Leptorkis grossa (Rchb.f.) Kuntze; Liparis rizalensis Ames; Liparis tateishii Kudô; Stichorkis grossa (Rchb.f.) Marg., Szlach. & Kulak

= Liparis grossa =

Species of plant

Liparis grossa is a species of flowering plant in the family Orchidaceae. It is native to wet tropical forests of eastern and southern Taiwan, including Orchid Island, and the Philippines. A pseudobulbous epiphyte, it is typically found on large trees in forest edges at elevations from sea level to 500 m (1,600 ft).
