= Maevia Noemí Correa =

Argentinian botanist

Maevia Noemí Correa (1914–2005) was an Argentine botanist, researcher, botanical curator, and professor. She studied at the Faculty of Natural Sciences and Museum Studies at the National University of La Plata, and in 1953 completed a doctorate in natural sciences at the same university, with a dissertation titled, "Las Orquídeas Argentinas de la Tribu Polychondreae Schltr., subtribu Spiranthinae Pfitzer", under the direction of Dr. Ángel Lulio Cabrera. Between 1956 and 1957, the American Association of University Women sponsored her study at the University of California, Berkeley. From 1956 to 1958, she served as technical researcher at the Ministerio de Agricultura y Ganadería, and the Botany Institute in Argentina. She is associated with the National Agricultural Technology Institute (NITA) and served there between 1958 and 1983 as a technical researcher. She worked on several projects during her career including "Estudio y relevamiento de la Flora Patagónica", and "Estudio taxonómico de la Flora Patagónica". She served as herbarium curator, and as the Argentine National Coordinator of the Regional Flora Plan (1981–1990).

== Honours ==
In her honour, 14 February has been designated "Día del Orquideófilo" (Orchid Day), since she devoted her life to the study of orchids.

== Selected works ==
The standard author abbreviation M.N.Correa is used to indicate this person as the author when citing a botanical name.

=== Books ===
- Correa, M. N. (ed.) Flora patagónica. Buenos Aires: INTA, 1969 – 1999. 7 v. Colección científica; t. 8. Parte 1 Introducción, clave general de familias, Pteridophyta y Gymnospermae — Parte 2 Typhaceae an Orchidaceae (excepto Gramineae) — Parte 3 Gramineae — Parte 4a Dicotyledones diapétalas (Salicaceae a Cruciferae) — Parte 4b Dicotyledones diapétalas (Droseraceae a Leguminosae) — Parte 5 Dicotyledones diapétalas (Oxalidaceae a Cornaceae) — Parte 6 Dicotyledones Gamopétalas (Ericaceae a Calyceraceae) — Parte 7 Compositae

=== Book chapters ===
- Barboza, GE & Correa, MN. 1988. Geraniaceae, pp. 29–25, en M. N. Correa (ed.), Flora Patagónica. Dicotiledoneae dialipétalas: (Oxalidaceae a Cornaceae). Colec. Cient. INTA. 8 (5).
- Boelcke, O, NM Correa, DM Moore, FA Roig, 1985. Catálogo de las Plantas Vasculares, pp. 129–255, en O Boelcke, DM Moore & FA Roig (eds.), Transecta Botánica de la Patagonia Austral. Proyecto Internacional: Consejo Nacional de Investigaciones Científicas y Técnicas (Argentina); Instituto de la Patagonia (Chile); Royal Society (Gran Bretaña), Buenos Aires
- Correa, MN. 1959. Las orquídeas cultivadas en la Argentina, pp. 269–287, en L. R. Parodi (ed.), Enciclopedia Argentina de Agricultura y Jardinería 1. Acme Agency
- ———. 1968. Orchidaceae, en AL Cabrera (ed.), Flora de la Provincia de Buenos Aires. Colec. Cient. Inst. Nac. Tecnol. Agropec. 4 (1): 575-607
- ———. 1969. Liliaceae, en MN Correa (ed.), Flora Patagónica. Monocotyledoneae (excepto Gramineae). Colec. Cient. INTA. 8(2): 22-23
- ———. 1969. Zannicheliaceae, en MN Correa (ed.), Flora Patagónica. Monocotyledoneae (excepto Gramineae). Colec. Cient. INTA. 8(2): 24-25
- ———. 1969. Alismataceae, en MN Correa (ed.), Flora Patagónica. Monocotyledoneae (excepto Gramineae). Colec. Cient. INTA. 8(2): 28-32
- ———. 1969. Juncaginaceae, en MN Correa (ed.), Flora Patagónica. Monocotyledoneae (excepto Gramineae). Colec. Cient. INTA. 8(2): 33-37
- ———. 1969. Dioscoreaceae, en MN Correa (ed.), Flora Patagónica. Monocotyledoneae (excepto Gramineae). Colec. Cient. INTA. 8(2): 165-166
- ———. 1969. Corsiaceae, en MN Correa (ed.), Flora Patagónica. Monocotyledoneae (excepto Gramineae). Colec. Cient. INTA. 8(2): 187
- ———. 1969. Orchidaceae, en MN Correa (ed.), Flora Patagónica. Monocotyledoneae (excepto Gramineae). Colec. Cient. INTA. 8(2): 188-209
- ———. 1984. Salicaceae, en MN Correa (ed.), Flora Patagónica. Dicotiledoneae dialipétalas (Salicaceae a Cruciferae). Colec. Cient. INTA. 8(4a): 1-3
- ———. 1984. Fabaceae, en MN Correa (ed.), Flora Patagónica. Dicotiledoneae dialipétalas (Salicaceae a Cruciferae). Colec. Cient. INTA. 8(4a): 4-11
- ———. 1984. Olacaceae, en MN Correa (ed.), Flora Patagónica. Dicotiledoneae dialipétalas (Salicaceae a Cruciferae). Colec. Cient. INTA. 8(4a): 28-29
- ———. 1984. Vivianiaceae, en MN Correa (ed.), Flora Patagónica. Dicotiledoneae dialipétalas (Salicaceae a Cruciferae). Colec. Cient. INTA. 8(4a): 280-281
- ———. 1984. Saxifragaceae, en MN Correa (ed.), Flora Patagónica. Dicotiledoneae dialipétalas (Rosaceae a Leguminosae). Colec. Cient. INTA. 8(4b): 11-18
- ———. 1984. Escalloniaceae p.p., en MN Correa (ed.), Flora Patagónica. Dicoliledoneae dialipétalas (Rosaceae a Leguminosae). Colec. Cient. INTA. 8(4b): 27-37
- ———. 1984. Hydrangeaceae, en MN Correa (ed.), Flora Patagónica. Dicotiledoneae dialipétalas (Rosaceae a Leguminosae). Colec. Cient. INTA. 8(4b): 38-40
- ———. 1984. Donatiaceae, en MN Correa (ed.), Flora Patagónica. Dicotiledoneae dialipétalas (Rosaceae a Leguminosae). Colec. Cient. INTA. 8(4b): 46-47
- ——— & Burkart, A. 1984. Adesmia (Leguminosae), en MN Correa (ed.), Flora Patagónica. Dicotiledoneae dialipétalas (Rosaceae a Leguminosae). Colec. Cient. INTA. 8(4b): 92-161
- ———. 1984. Orchidaceae, en AT Hunziker (ed.), Clave de los géneros de Fanerógamas de la Argentina. Bol. Soc. Argent. Bot. 23(1-4): 229-310
- ———. 1988. Ledocarpaceae, en MN Correa (ed.), Flora Patagónica. Dicotiledoneae dialipétalas (Oxalidaceae a Cornaceae). Colec. Cient. Inst. Nac. Tecnol. Agropec. 8(5): 40-42
- ———. 1988. Euphorbiaceae, en MN Correa (ed.), Flora Patagónica. Dicoliledoneae dialipétalas (Oxalidaceae a Cornaceae). Colec. Cient. INTA. 8(5): 75-91
- ———. 1988. Frankeniaceae, en MN Correa (ed.), Flora Patagónica. Dicotiledoneae dialipétalas (Oxalidaceae a Cornaceae). Colec. Cient. INTA. 8(5): 161-166
- ———. 1988. Malesherbiaceae, en MN Correa (ed.), Flora Patagónica. Dicotiledoneae dialipétalas (Oxalidaceae a Cornaceae). Colec. Cient. INTA. 8(5): 196-198
- ———. 1996. Orchidaceae, en F. Zuloaga & O. Morrone (eds.), Catálogo de las Plantas Vasculares de la República Argentina. Monographs in Systematic Botanic from the Missouri Botanical Garden 60: 242-270
- ———. 1997. Orquídeas, en HB Lahitte et al. (eds.) Plantas de la Costa. L.O.L.A. Buenos Aires
- ———. 1998. Orquídeas, en HB Lahitte et al. (eds.). Plantas Medicinales Rioplatenses. L.O.L.A. Buenos Aires
- ———. 1998. Flora patagónica. Clave para la determinación de las familias de Fanerógamas de la Flora Patagónica. Colec. Cient. INTA. 8(1): 266-281
- ———. 1999. Valerianaceae p.p., en MN Correa (ed.), Flora Patagónica. Dicotiledoneae gamopétalas (Ericaceae a Calyceraceae). Colec. Cient. INTA. 8(6): 448-468
- ———. 1999. Schrophulariaceae p.p., en MN Correa (ed.), Flora Patagónica. Dicotiledoneae gamopétalas (Ericaceae a Calyceraceae). Colec. Cient. INTA. 8(6): 305-350; 372-378
- ———. 1999. Oleaceae, en MN Correa (ed.), Flora Patagónica. Dicotiledoneae gamopétalas (Ericaceae a Calyceraceae). Colec. Cient. INTA. 8(6): 38-41
- ———. 1999. Polemoniaceae, en MN Correa (ed.), Flora Patagónica. Dicotiledoneae gamopétalas (Ericaceae a Calyceraceae). Colec. Cient. INTA. 8(6): 97-106
- ———. 1999. Boraginaceae, en MN Correa (ed.), Flora Patagónica. Dicotiledoneae gamopétalas (Ericaceae a Calyceraceae). Colec. Cient. INTA. 8(6): 116-146
- ———. 1999. Lamiaceae p.p., en MN Correa (ed.), Flora Patagónica. Dicotiledoneae gamopétalas (Ericaceae a Calyceraceae). Colec. Cient. INTA. 8(6): 196-220
- ———. 1999. Gesneriaceae, en MN Correa (ed.), Flora Patagónica. Dicotiledoneae gamopétalas (Ericaceae a Calyceraceae). Colec. Cient. INTA. 8(6): 388-390
- ———. 1999. Dipsacaceae, en MN Correa (ed.), Flora Patagónica. Dicotiledoneae gamopétalas (Ericaceae a Calyceraceae). Colec. Cient. INTA. 8(6): 469-471
- ———. 1999. Stylidaceae, en MN Correa (ed.), Flora Patagónica. Dicotiledoneae gamopétalas (Ericaceae a Calyceraceae). Colec. Cient. INTA. 8(6): 489-491
- ———. 1999. Verbenaceae p.p., en MN Correa (ed.), Flora Patagónica. Dicotiledoneae gamopétalas (Ericaceae a Calyceraceae). Colec. Cient. INTA. 8(6): 147-195
- ———. 1999. Lentibulariaceae, en MN Correa (ed.), Flora Patagónica. Dicoliledoneae gamopétalas (Ericaceae a Calyceraceae). Colec. Cient. INTA. 8(6): 391-395
- ———. 1998. Del Vitto, LA, EM Petenatti & MN Correa, 1998. Evolución del conocimiento botánico de la Patagonia Argentina. En MN Correa (ed.), Flora Patagónica, Colec. Cient. INTA. 8(1): 197–265.

== Bibliography ==
- Fortunato, Renée H. (July 2005). "Maevia Noemí Correa (1914-2005)". Boletín de la Sociedad Argentina de Botánica. 40 (1–2): 137–139.
- Rúgolo de Agrasar, Zulma E.; Bacigalupo, Nélida B. (December 2005). "Maevia Noemí Correa (1914-2005)". Darwiniana. Nueva Serie. 43 (1–4): 281–285.
