= Hanna Margońska =

Polish botanist

Hanna Bogna Margońska, born 1968 (fl. 1998) is a Polish botanist known for her work on orchids.

Dr. Hanna Margońska is a botanical researcher and faculty member at Gdańsk University, Department of Plant Taxonomy and Conservation.

== Scholarly publications ==
=== 1998 ===
- Dariusz L. Szlachetko, Hanna B. Margońska, Piotr Rutkowski. 1998. Fingardia yamapensis, a new orchid species of Orchidaceae from New Guinea. Fragm. Flor. Geobot. 43 (1): 3–6.
- Dariusz L. Szlachetko, Hanna B. Margońska. 1998. Three new species of the genus Crepidium Bl. (Orchidaceae) from South-Eastern Asia. Fragm. Flor. Geobot. 43 (1): 7-12.
- Nicolas Halle, Dariusz L. Szlachetko, Hanna B. Margońska, Piotr Rutkowski. 1998. Distribution of the orchid in West and South-West Pacific islands- a preliminary report. Fragm. Flor. Geobot. 43 (1): 39–58.
- Dariusz L. Szlachetko, Hanna B. Margońska. 1998. New species of the genus Crepidium Bl. (Orchidaceae), from Australasia. Adansonia ser.3., 20 (2):341-349.
- Dariusz L. Szlachetko, Hanna B. Margońska. 1998. Notes on the genus Crepidium Bl. (Orchidaceae, Malaxidinae), with descriptions of the new species from Northern Sumatra. Fragm. Flor. Geobot. 43 (2): 183–188.

=== 1999 ===
- Dariusz L. Szlachetko, Hanna B. Margońska. 1999. Redefinition of the genus Pseudoliparis Finet, with descriptions of new species. Adansonia ser.3., 21 (2): 275–282.
- Dariusz L. Szlachetko, Hanna B. Margońska, Piotr Rutkowski. 1999. Dienia seidenfadeniana, a new orchid species from Australia. Adansonia ser.3., 21 (2): 221–223.
- Hanna B. Margońska, Dariusz L. Szlachetko, T. Kubala. 1999. Ein neue Art der Gattung Crepidium (Orchidaceae, Malaxidinae) aus Papua Neuguinea. Die Orchidee 50 (5): 510–512.
- Hanna B. Margońska, Dariusz L. Szlachetko, T. Kubala. 1999. Ein neue Art der Gattung Crepidium (Orchidaceae, Malaxidinae) aus Papua Neuguinea. Die Orchidee 50 (6): 651–653.

=== 2000 ===
- Hanna B. Margońska, Dariusz L. Szlachetko. 2000. New species of the genus Crepidium Bl. (Orchidaceae, Malaxidinae) from New Guinea. - Adansonia ser. 3., 22 (2): 265–267.
- Hanna B. Margońska, Dariusz L. Szlachetko. 2000. Notes on the genus Pseudoliparis Finet (Orchidaceae, Malaxidinae), with descriptions of two new species from New Guinea. Ann. Bot. Fen. 37: 279–283.
- Dariusz L. Szlachetko, Hanna B. Margońska. 2000. New Crepidium (Orchidaceae, Malaxidinae) species from Solomon Island and Bismarck Archipelago. Ann. Bot. Fen. 37: 303–307.

=== 2001 ===
- Hanna B. Margońska, Dariusz L. Szlachetko. 2001. Saurolophorkis Marg. & Szlach., gen. Nov. (Orchidaceae, Malaxidinae), a new orchid genus from New Guinea. Pol. Bot. Journ. 46 (1): 7–9.
- Dariusz L. Szlachetko, Hanna B. Margońska. 2001. Genera et Species Orchidalium 2. Spuricianthus (Orchidaceae), a new orchid genus from New Caledonia. Pol.Bot.Journ. 46(1):27-29.
- Hanna B. Margońska, Dariusz L. Szlachetko. 2001. More notes on the genus Pseudoliparis Finet. (Orchidaceae, Malaxidinae). Pol. Bot. Journ. 46 (1): 39–42.
- Hanna B. Margońska, Dariusz L. Szlachetko. 2001. Notes on the genus Crepidium (Orchidaceae, Malaxidinae). Pol. Bot. Journ. 46 (1): 43–54.
- Hanna B. Margońska, Dariusz L. Szlachetko. 2001. A new Crepidium species (Orchidaceae, Malaxidinae), from Sarawak, Borneo. Pol. Bot. Journ. 46 (1): 67–69.
- Dariusz L. Szlachetko, Hanna B. Margońska. 2001. Crossoglossa neirynckiana Szlach. & Marg., sp. Nov., a new species of the subtribe Malaxidinae (Orchidaceae), from Ecuador. Ann. Bot. Fen. 38: 91–93.
- Hanna B. Margońska, Dariusz L. Szlachetko. 2001. Alatiliparis Marg. & Szlach., gen. Nov. (Orchidaceae, Malaxidinae), a new orchid genus with two new species from Sumatra. Ann. Bot. Fen. 38: 77–81.
- Dariusz L. Szlachetko, Hanna B. Margońska. 2001. Genera et Species Orchidalium 3. Subfamily Epidendroideae. Pol. Bot. Journ. 46 (2): 113–121.
- Dariusz L. Szlachetko, Hanna B. Margońska. 2001. Genera et Species Orchidalium 4. The new South American genus Jouyella (Thelymitroideae). Pol. Bot. Journ. 46 (2): 123–125.
- Hanna B. Margońska, Dariusz L. Szlachetko. 2001. Materials to the revision of the genus Seidenfia Szlach. (Orchidaceae, Malaxidinae), with description of new species. Pol. Bot. J. 46 (1): 47–62.

=== 2002 ===
- Margońska H. B., 2002. A new Crepidium species (Orchidaceae, Malaxidinae), from Sabah, Borneo. Ann. Bot. Fen. 39 (1): 63–66.
- Dariusz L. Szlachetko, Hanna B. Margońska. 2002. Gynostemia Orchidalium. Vol. 2. Orchidaceae (Epidendroidea). Ann. Bot. Fen. 197pp+287 figs.
- Piotr Rutkowski, Hanna B. Margońska. 2002. Index of Gynostemia Orchidalium. Vol. 1 and Vol.2. Ann. Bot. Fen. 173: 262–275.

=== 2003 ===
- Hanna B. Margońska. 2003. Materials towards the revision of the genus Pseudoliparis Finet (Orchidaceae, Malaxidinae) – part 1. Ann. Bot. Fen. 40 (1): 63–66.
- Hanna B. Margońska. 2003. Materials to taxonomic revision of subtribe Malaxidinae genera (Orchidales, Orchidaceae). Genus Intern. J. Invertebrate Taxonomy (Suppl.): 53–55.
- Hanna B. Margońska. 2003. Materials towards the revision of the genus Pseudoliparis Finet (Orchidaceae, Malaxidinae) – part 2. section Oistochilus. Ann. Bot. Fen. 40 (4): 357–372.
- Piotr Rutkowski, Hanna B. Margońska. 2003. Index of Gynostemia Orchidalium. Vol. 3. Ann. Bot. Fen. 176: 306–311.

=== 2004 ===
- Hanna B. Margońska, Dariusz L. Szlachetko. 2004. Disticholiparis Marg. & Szlach. – new genus of subtribe Malaxidinae (Orchidales, Orchidaceae). Die Orchidee 55(2):175-179.
- Dariusz L. Szlachetko, Hanna B. Margońska. 2004. Habenariinae (Orchidaceae, Orchidoideae) – contributions to the revision the subtribe (8). Die Orchidee 55(2):172-174.
- Hanna B. Margońska. 2005. Materials towards the revision of the genus Pseudoliparis Finet (Orchidaceae, Malaxidinae) – part 3. section Pseudoliparis. Ann. Bot. Fen. 42: 267–291.

=== 2005 ===
- Dariusz L. Szlachetko, Hanna B. Margońska, Joanna Mytnik. 2005. Veyretella flabellata (Orchidaceae, Habenariinae), a new species from Gabon. Ann. Bot. Fen. 42 (3): 227–229.
- Hanna B. Margońska. 2005. Crepidium klimkoanae – a new orchid species (Orchidaceae, Malaxidinae), from Thailand. Candollea 60 (2): 289–303.

=== 2006 ===
- Hanna B. Margońska, Dariusz L. Szlachetko. 2006. The taxonomic revision of the genus Orestias Ridl. (Orchidales, Malaxidinea) from Africa. Ann. Nat. Mus. Wien. ser. Bot. 107.: 209–220.
- Hanna B. Margońska. 2006. Contribution to the taxonomic revision of the genus Crepidium (Orchidaceae-Malaxidinae): the new subsection Maximowiczianae (section Hololobus) Edin. J. Bot. 62 (3): 165–179.
- Hanna B. Margońska. 2006. A new combination and new subsection in Crepidium (Orchidaceae). Edin. J. Bot. 62 (3): 193–194.
- Hanna B. Margońska. 2006. Notes about genus Tamayorkis Szalch. with description of new species (Orchidales, Malaxidinea). Richardiana. 4(3): 123–129.
- Dariusz L. Szlachetko, Hanna B. Margońska. 2006. Stellilabium amicorum Szlach. & Marg. spec. nov. (Orchidaceae, Telipogoneae), eine neue Art aus Ecuador. Die Orchidee 57 (3): 320–324.
- Dariusz L. Szlachetko, Joanna Mytnik-Ejsmont, Agnieszka Romowicz, Hanna B. Margońska. 2006. Takulumena Szlach., & Marg. A New genus of the subtribe Epidendrinae (Orchidaceae) from Ecuador. Die Orchidee 57 (3): 325–329.
- Dariusz L. Szlachetko, Hanna B. Margońska. 2006. Redefinition of the genera Malaxis Sol. ex Sw. Microstylis (Nutt.) Eaton (Orchidaceae, Malaxidinae). Acta Soc. Bot. Pol. 75(3): 229–231.
- Hanna B. Margońska. 2006. State of researches of genus Disticholiparis Marg. & Szlach. (Orchidales, Malaxidinae). Biodiversity: Research and Conservation. 1-2: 11–14. Poznań.
- Dariusz L. Szlachetko, Magdalena Kułak, Piotr Rutkowski, Hanna B. Margońska. 2006. Epidendrum kusibabi Szlach., Kulak, Rutk. & Marg. spec. nov. (Orchidaceae, Epidendroideae), eine neue Art aus den Anden Ecuadors. Die Orchidee 57 (4): 480–483.
- Hanna B. Margońska. 2006. Seidenforchis – a new genus of subtribe Malaxidinae (Orchidaceae), from Thailand. Acta Soc. Bot. Pol. 75(4): 301–307.
- Dariusz L. Szlachetko, Hanna B. Margońska. 2006. New Holothrix species (Orchidaceae, Orchidoideae) from Angola. Candollea. 60 (2): 467–470.

=== 2007 ===
- Hanna B. Margońska. 2007. Platystyliparis Marg. - a new genus of the subtribe Malaxidinae Richardiana 7(1): 33–41.
- Hanna B. Margońska. 2007. A new combination, new synonym and a lectotype in Lisowskia Szlach. (Orchidaceae, Malaxidinae). Richardiana 7(2): 50–52.

=== 2008 ===
- Hanna B. Margońska, Agnieszka Kowalkowska. 2008. Une nouvelle forme de Anacamptis pyramidalis (Orchidaceae). Richardiana. 8(1) : 1–5.
- Hanna B. Margońska. 2008. Malaxidinae index nominum – genus Seidenfia Szalch. (Orchidales, Orchidaceae). Ann. Nat. Mus. Wien. ser. Bot. ser. Bot. 109. 173–178.
- Hanna B. Margońska. 2008. Malaxidinae index nominum – genus Microstylis (Nutt.) Eaton emend. Szalch. & Marg. (Orchidales, Orchidaceae). Ann. Nat. Mus. Wien. ser. Bot. 109. 179–189.
- Hanna B. Margońska. 2008. Malaxidinae index nominum – genus Tamayorkis Szalch. (Orchidales, Orchidaceae). Ann. Nat. Mus. Wien. ser. Bot. 109. 203–206.
- Hanna B. Margońska. 2008. Malaxidinae index nominum – genera Lisowskia Szalch. and Kornasia Szalch. (Orchidales, Orchidaceae). Ann. Nat. Mus. Wien. ser. Bot. 109. 191–196.
- Hanna B. Margońska. 2008. Malaxidinae index nominum – genus Pseudoliparis Finet emend. Szalch. & Marg. Sect. Oistochilos (Orchidales, Orchidaceae). Ann. Nat. Mus. Wien. ser. Bot. 109. 197–202.
- Dariusz L. Szlachetko, Hanna B. Margońska, Magdalena Kułak 2008. Nomenclatoral changes in Liparis-complex (Malaxidinae, Epidendroideae). Acta Soc. Bot. Pol. 77 (1): 35–40.
- Hanna B. Margońska. 2008. Taxonomic revision of Asiatic genus Glossochilopsis Szlach. (Malaxidinae, Orchidaceae). Richardiana. 8(2):70-79.
- Hanna B. Margońska, Agnieszka Kowalkowska. 2008. Taxonomic revision of Asiatic genus Dienia Lindl. (Malaxidinae, Orchidaceae). Ann. Bot. Fen. 45: 97-104.
- Dariusz L. Szlachetko, Joanna Mytnik-Ejsmont, Hanna B. Margońska. 2008. Cephalanthera ericiflora Szlach. & Mytnik sp. Nov. (Orchidaceae, Neottioideae), a new species from Laos. Acta Soc. Bot. Pol. 77 (3): 213–215.

=== 2009 ===
- Hanna B. Margońska. 2009. Nomenclatural changes in Malgasian representatives of Malaxidinae (Orchidales, Orchidaceae). Richardiana 9(2): 90–99.
- Hanna B. Margońska. 2009. Malaxidinae index nominum – genus Pseudoliparis Finet emend. Szalch. & Marg. Sect. Pseudoliparis (Orchidales, Orchidaceae). Ann. Nat. Mus. Wien. ser. Bot. 110 B. 249–258.
- Hanna B. Margońska, Marta Kras, Magdalena Sawicka. 2009. New record of Habenaria tahitensis Nadeaud from the French Polynesia. Ann. Nat. Mus. Wien. ser. Bot. 110 B. 260–261.
- Agnieszka Kowalkowska, Hanna B. Margońska. 2009. Diversity of labellar micromorphological structures in selected species of Malaxidinae (Orchidales). Acta Soc. Bot. Pol. 78 (2): 141–150.
- Hanna B. Margońska. 2009. A new Stichorkis species from Borneo (Orchidaceae, Malaxidinae). Richardiana 10(1): 3-10.
- Hanna B. Margońska. 2009. Crossoliparis – a new genus of Malaxidinae (Orchidaceae, Malaxideae), from neotropic. Acta Soc. Bot. Pol. 78 (4): 297–299.
- Hanna B. Margońska. 2009. A new Stichorkis species (Orchidaceae, Malaxidinae) from Sarawak in Malaysia. Biodiversity: Research and Conservation. 13: 9-12.

=== 2010 ===
- Marta Kras, Hanna B. Margońska. 2010. A new taxon of Habenaria (Orchidaceae, Habenariinae) from Tahiti. Ann. Nat. Mus. Wien. ser. Bot. 111 B.: 171–173.
- Hanna B. Margońska. 2010. Two new combination and a new subsection in Crepidium (Orchidaceae, Malaxidinaea). Ann. Nat. Mus. Wien. ser. Bot. 111 B.: 175–180.
- Kowalkowska A., Margońska H.B., Kozieradzka-Kiszkurno M. 2010. Comparative Anatomy of the Lip Spur and Additional Lateral Sepal Spurs in a Three-Spurred Form (f. fumeauxiana) of Anacamptis pyramidalis. Acta Biologica Cracoviensia. Ser. Bota. 52(1): 13–18.
- Hanna B. Margońska. 2010. A two new species of the genus Pseudoliparis Finet (Orchidaceae, Malaxidinae), from New Guinea. Biodiversity: Research and Conservation. 17: 3–8.
- Hanna B. Margońska, Dariusz L. Szlachetko. 2010. Orchidaceae of Tahiti (Polynesie Francaise). Gdańsk University Press.: 1–140, 37 phots. + 26 figs.
