= List of Crepidium species =

This is a list of the 292 accepted species of the genus Crepidium Blume (1825).

== a ==
- Crepidium acuminatum
- Crepidium alagense
- Crepidium amabilis
- Crepidium amplectens
- Crepidium andersonii
- Crepidium angustifoveum
- Crepidium aphyllum
- Crepidium arachnoideum
- Crepidium arboricola
- Crepidium arietinum
- Crepidium aschistum
- Crepidium atratum
- Crepidium atrobrachiatum
- Crepidium atrosanguineum
- Crepidium auratum

== b ==
- Crepidium bahanense
- Crepidium balabacense
- Crepidium bancanoides
- Crepidium bancanum
- Crepidium bataanense
- Crepidium bengkulense
- Crepidium biauritum
- Crepidium bidentiferum
- Crepidium binabayense
- Crepidium bisepalum
- Crepidium bispiriferum
- Crepidium brachycaulos
- Crepidium brachyodontum
- Crepidium bracteosum
- Crepidium brevidentatum
- Crepidium breviscapum
- Crepidium burbidgei

== c ==
- Crepidium calcareum
- Crepidium calcicola
- Crepidium calophyllum
- Crepidium caricoides
- Crepidium carinatifolium
- Crepidium carrii
- Crepidium celebicum
- Crepidium chlorophrys
- Crepidium christinae
- Crepidium circaeum
- Crepidium clemensii
- Crepidium comans
- Crepidium comberi
- Crepidium commelinifolium
- Crepidium concavum
- Crepidium copelandii
- Crepidium cordanthemon
- Crepidium cordiglottis
- Crepidium crassidens
- Crepidium crassilabris
- Crepidium crenatilobum
- Crepidium cribbianum
- Crepidium cruciatum
- Crepidium cucullatum
- Crepidium cuneipetalum
- Crepidium cupreum
- Crepidium cupuliflorum
- Crepidium curvatulum
- Crepidium curviauriculatum
- Crepidium cyanobrachium

== d ==
- Crepidium damusicum
- Crepidium davaensis
- Crepidium decumbens
- Crepidium dentatum
- Crepidium dewildeanum
- Crepidium diploceras
- Crepidium distans
- Crepidium dolichostachyum
- Crepidium dresslerianum
- Crepidium dryadum

== e ==
- Crepidium elegans
- Crepidium elmeri
- Crepidium epiphyticum
- Crepidium euanthum
- Crepidium exilis

== f ==
- Crepidium falcifolium
- Crepidium fasciatum
- Crepidium fimbriatum
- Crepidium finetii
- Crepidium fissum
- Crepidium flammeum
- Crepidium flavescens
- Crepidium flavovirens
- Crepidium floscularium
- Crepidium foetidum
- Crepidium foliosum
- Crepidium fontinale
- Crepidium fulvum

== g ==
- Crepidium gibbsiae
- Crepidium godefroyi
- Crepidium graciliscapum
- Crepidium graminifolium
- Crepidium grandiflorum
- Crepidium grandifolium
- Crepidium gregorii

== h ==
- Crepidium hahajimense
- Crepidium hainanense
- Crepidium heliophilum
- Crepidium heliophobum
- Crepidium hippocrepiformis
- Crepidium hoi
- Crepidium holttumianum
- Crepidium horielense
- Crepidium humeratum
- Crepidium hutchinsonianum
- Crepidium hydrophilum

== i ==
- Crepidium imthurnii
- Crepidium incurviforceps
- Crepidium incurvum
- Crepidium inexspectatum
- Crepidium insulare
- Crepidium integrilabium
- Crepidium irregularis

== j ==
- Crepidium josephianum
- Crepidium junghuhnii

== k ==
- Crepidium kabense
- Crepidium kandae
- Crepidium kempfii
- Crepidium kerintjiense
- Crepidium kerstingianum
- Crepidium keysseri
- Crepidium khasianum
- Crepidium kinabaluense
- Crepidium klabatense
- Crepidium klimkoanum
- Crepidium kobi
- Crepidium koordersii
- Crepidium kortylewskianum

== l ==
- Crepidium laciniosum
- Crepidium laeve
- Crepidium lamii
- Crepidium langkawiense
- Crepidium latilabre
- Crepidium latipetalum
- Crepidium latisegmentum
- Crepidium latisepalum
- Crepidium latum
- Crepidium lawleri
- Crepidium laxum
- Crepidium ledermannii
- Crepidium leucodon
- Crepidium lilacinum
- Crepidium lobatocallosum
- Crepidium lokonense
- Crepidium longifolium
- Crepidium longispicum
- Crepidium lowii
- Crepidium loxium
- Crepidium lunatum
- Crepidium luniferum
- Crepidium lyroglossum

== m ==
- Crepidium maaikeae
- Crepidium maboroensis
- Crepidium mackinnonii
- Crepidium macrochilum
- Crepidium macrophyllum
- Crepidium macrotis
- Crepidium maculatum
- Crepidium magnicallosa
- Crepidium malabarica
- Crepidium mambulilingense
- Crepidium mariae
- Crepidium marsupichilum
- Crepidium matsudae
- Crepidium maximowiczianum
- Crepidium megalanthum
- Crepidium melanophyllum
- Crepidium merapiense
- Crepidium merrillii
- Crepidium metallicum
- Crepidium micholitzianum
- Crepidium micranthum
- Crepidium microhybos
- Crepidium mieczyslawii
- Crepidium mindorense
- Crepidium moluccanum
- Crepidium multiflorum
- Crepidium myosotis

== n ==
- Crepidium negrosianum
- Crepidium nemorale
- Crepidium nephroglossum
- Crepidium nigrescens
- Crepidium nitidum

== o ==
- Crepidium obovatum
- Crepidium ochyranum
- Crepidium octodentatum
- Crepidium oculatum
- Crepidium oliganthum
- Crepidium olivaceum
- Crepidium orbicans
- Crepidium orbiculare
- Crepidium oreocharis
- Crepidium ovalisepalum

== p ==
- Crepidium paguroides
- Crepidium palawense
- Crepidium parryae
- Crepidium partitilobum
- Crepidium pectinatum
- Crepidium pedicellare
- Crepidium perakense
- Crepidium petiolare
- Crepidium platychilum
- Crepidium pleistanthum
- Crepidium polyodon
- Crepidium prasinum
- Crepidium productum
- Crepidium propinquum
- Crepidium protractum
- Crepidium puberulum
- Crepidium pubicallosum
- Crepidium punctatum
- Crepidium purpureonervosum
- Crepidium purpureoviridis
- Crepidium purpureum

== q ==
- Crepidium quadridens
- Crepidium quadridentatum
- Crepidium quadrilobum

== r ==
- Crepidium raciborskii
- Crepidium rajanum
- Crepidium ramosum
- Crepidium ranauense
- Crepidium ravanii
- Crepidium reineckeanum
- Crepidium repens
- Crepidium resupinatum
- Crepidium retusum
- Crepidium rhabdophyllum
- Crepidium rheedei
- Crepidium rhinoceros
- Crepidium ridleyanum
- Crepidium ridleyi
- Crepidium riparium
- Crepidium robinsonii

== s ==
- Crepidium saccatum
- Crepidium sagittatum
- Crepidium sagittiflorum
- Crepidium samoense
- Crepidium saprophytum
- Crepidium schlechteri
- Crepidium schumannianum
- Crepidium sciaphilum
- Crepidium segaarense
- Crepidium seidenfadenianum
- Crepidium seleniglossum
- Crepidium setipes
- Crepidium sichuanicum
- Crepidium slamatense
- Crepidium soleiforme
- Crepidium sororium
- Crepidium stenophyllum
- Crepidium stenostachys
- Crepidium stolleanum
- Crepidium sublobatum
- Crepidium sumatrense
- Crepidium sundaicum
- Crepidium szlachetkianum

== t ==
- Crepidium taurinum
- Crepidium taylorii
- Crepidium tenggerense
- Crepidium ternatense
- Crepidium tetralobum
- Crepidium tixieri
- Crepidium tjiwideiense
- Crepidium torricellense
- Crepidium toxopei
- Crepidium trichopodum
- Crepidium tripartitum
- Crepidium triphyllum
- Crepidium trukense
- Crepidium tubulosum

== u ==
- Crepidium umbonatum
- Crepidium umbraticola
- Crepidium uncatum
- Crepidium undulatum

== v ==
- Crepidium van-royenii
- Crepidium variabile
- Crepidium venosum
- Crepidium vermeulenianum
- Crepidium verruculosum
- Crepidium vinicolor
- Crepidium vinosum
- Crepidium vitiense

== w ==
- Crepidium wappeanum
- Crepidium warapussae
- Crepidium warianum
- Crepidium wenzelii
- Crepidium werneri
- Crepidium williamsii
- Crepidium woodianum

== x ==
- Crepidium xanthochilum

== y ==
- Crepidium yamapense

== z ==
- Crepidium zippelii
