= Crepidium elegans =

Scientific classification
- Kingdom: Plantae
- Clade: Tracheophytes
- Clade: Angiosperms
- Clade: Monocots
- Order: Asparagales
- Family: Orchidaceae
- Subfamily: Epidendroideae
- Genus: Crepidium
- Species: C. elegans

Binomial name
- Crepidium elegans (Ridl.) Schuit. & J.J.Wood (2011)

Synonyms
- Malaxis elegans (Ridl.) Ames; Microstylis elegans Ridl. (1896)

Species of orchid

Crepidium elegans is a species of epidendroid orchids in the tribe Malaxideae. It is a pseudobulbous epiphyte endemic to the Malaysian state of Sarawak in northern Borneo.

== See also ==
- List of Crepidium species
