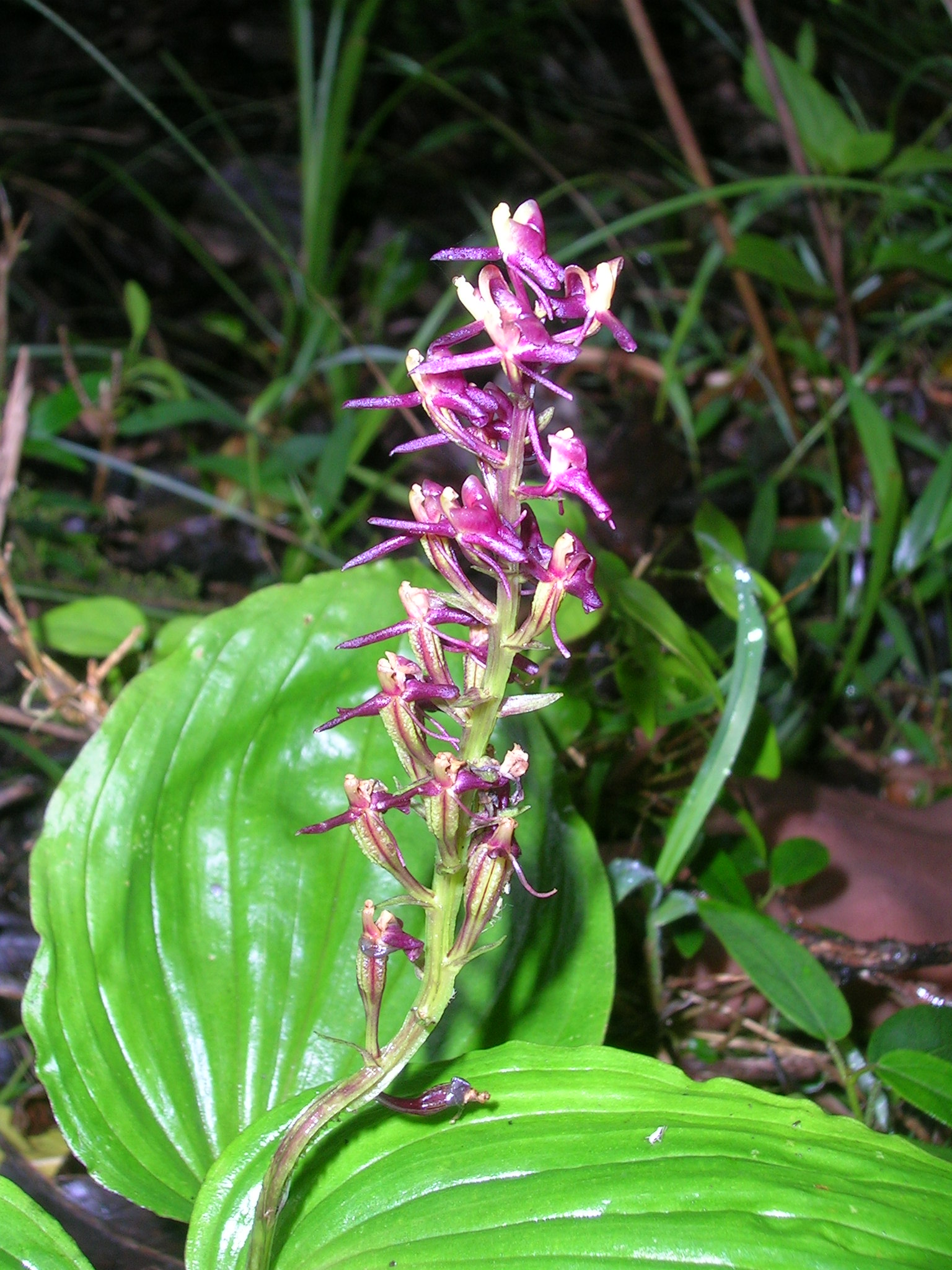
- Malaxis densiflora

Scientific classification
- Kingdom: Plantae
- Clade: Tracheophytes
- Clade: Angiosperms
- Clade: Monocots
- Order: Asparagales
- Family: Orchidaceae
- Subfamily: Epidendroideae
- Tribe: Malaxideae; Lindl. (1821) Coll. Bot. App. (1826)

Subtribes
- Dendrobiinae; Malaxidinae

Synonyms
- Liparidinae Lindl. Coll Bot. App. (1821); Microstylidinae Benth. J. Linn. Soc. Bot. 18, 287 (1881); Malaxidinae Benth. & Hook.f., Gen. Pl., 3, 463, 465 (1883); Liparideae Pfitzer, Etw. Nat. Anordn, Orch., 100 (1887); Oberoniinae Aver. Bot. Zhurn. (Kiev), 76, 121 (1991)

= Malaxideae =

Tribe of orchids

Malaxideae is an orchid tribe in the subfamily Epidendroideae.

== Taxonomy ==
In their 2015 review of Orchidaceae taxonomy, Chase and colleagues divided the tribe into two subtribes, Malaxidinae and Dendrobiinae. The latter is treated as a tribe by some authors.

The subtribes included the following genera:

- Subtribe Malaxidinae
  - Alatiliparis Marg. & Szlach.
  - Crepidium Blume
  - Crossoglossa Dressler & Dodson
  - Crossoliparis Marg.
  - Dienia Lindl.
  - Hammarbya Kuntze
  - Hippeophyllum Schltr.
  - Liparis Rich.
  - Malaxis Sol. ex Sw.
  - Oberonia Lindl.
  - Oberonioides Szlach.
  - Orestias Ridl.
  - Stichorkis Thouars
  - Tamayorkis Szlach.
- Subtribe Dendrobiinae
  - Dendrobium Sw.
  - Bulbophyllum Thouars

Risleya was previously included, but is now placed in the tribe Collabieae.

== See also ==
- Taxonomy of the Orchidaceae
