= Pihla (given name) =

Female given name

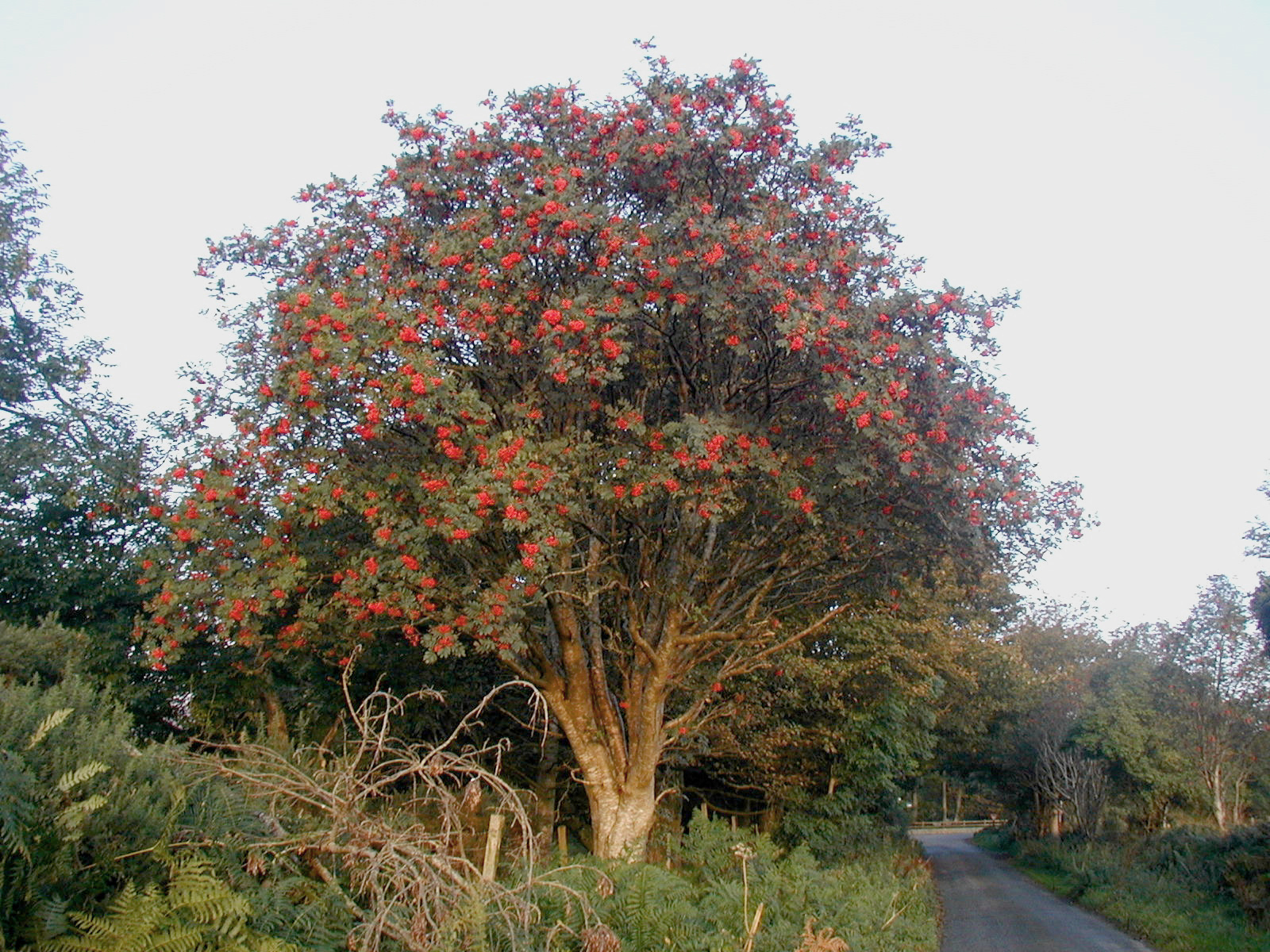
- Pihla is a Finnish female name meaning rowan tree.
- Gender: Female
- Language: Finnish

Origin
- Meaning: Rowan

Pihla is a feminine given name of Finnish origin meaning “rowan tree.” It has been among the most popular names for girls in Finland in recent years.

== People ==
- Pihla Keto-Huovinen (born 1974), Finnish politician currently serving in the Parliament of Finland.
- Pihla Viitala (born 1982), Finnish actress.

== Locations ==
- Pihla, Estonia, a village in Hiiu County in northwestern Estonia.
- Pihla-Kaibaldi Nature Reserve on Hiiumaa in western Estonia.
