= Orestias (disambiguation) =

Orestias may refer to:

- Orestiada, a town in the Evros regional unit, Greece
- the ancient Greek city of Orestias, now in Turkey
- Orestias (fish), a genus of South American fishes in the family Cyprinodontidae
- Orestias (plant), a genus of African plants in the family Orchidaceae
