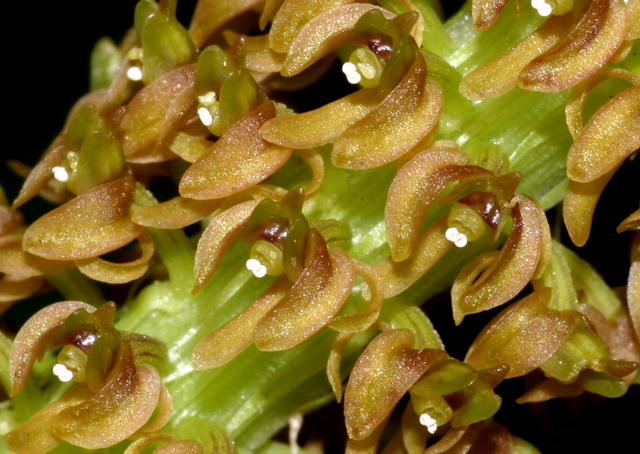

Scientific classification
- Kingdom: Plantae
- Clade: Tracheophytes
- Clade: Angiosperms
- Clade: Monocots
- Order: Asparagales
- Family: Orchidaceae
- Subfamily: Epidendroideae
- Genus: Dienia
- Species: D. ophrydis

Binomial name
- Dienia ophrydis (J.Koenig) Seidenf.

Synonyms
- Epidendrum ophrydis J.Koenig; Gastroglottis montana Blume; Malaxis ophrydis (J.Koenig) Ormerod; Crepidium ophrydis (J.Koenig) M.A.Clem. & D.L.Jones; Dienia montana (Blume) M.A.Clem. & D.L.Jones; Gastroglottis ophrydis (J.Koenig) A.N.Rao

= Dienia ophrydis =

Common snout orchid

Species of orchid

Dienia ophrydis, commonly known as the common snout orchid is a plant in the orchid family and is native to endemic to a broad area of Asia, Southeast Asia, the Philippines, New Guinea and northern Australia. It is a deciduous, terrestrial orchid with a cone-shaped stem, bright green, wavy leaves and many greenish, brown, reddish or purplish flowers crowded on a wiry flowering stem.

== Description ==
Dienia ophrydis is a terrestrial, deciduous herb with fleshy, cone-shaped stems 100–200 mm (4–8 in) and 10–20 mm (0.4–0.8 in) wide. There are between three and six bright green, broadly lance-shaped to egg-shaped leaves 100–300 mm (4–10 in) long and 50–90 mm (2–4 in) wide with wavy edges. A large number of greenish, brown, reddish or purplish, non-resupinate flowers are crowded along a brittle, wiry flowering stem 150–300 mm (6–10 in) long. The flowers are 5–6 mm (0.20–0.24 in) long and wide. The dorsal sepal is narrow oblong, about 3 mm (0.1 in) long, 1.5 mm (0.06 in) wide and turns downwards. The lateral sepals are egg-shaped, about 3 mm (0.1 in) long and 1 mm (0.04 in) wide and curve around the labellum. The petals are a linear in shape and similar in size to the sepals. The labellum is broadly egg-shaped, about 2.5 mm (0.1 in) long and 2 mm (0.08 in) wide with three blunt teeth on the end, the middle one longest and with a deeply pouched base. Flowering occurs between December and April.

== Taxonomy ==
The common snout orchid was first formally described in 1791 by Johann Gerhard König who gave it the name Epidendrum ophrydis and published the description in Observationes botanicae :sex fasciculis comprehensae. In 1997 Gunnar Seidenfaden changed the name to Dienia ophrydis. The specific epithet (ophrydis) is derived from the Ancient Greek word ophyrs meaning "brow" or "eyebrow".

This common name of this species in Chinese is 无耳沼兰 (wu er zhao lan).

== Distribution and habitat ==
Dienia ophrydis grows in wet forests, often near streams and swampy areas. It is the most widespread species in the genus and is found in China, Cambodia, Bhutan, India, Japan, Laos, Malaysia, Myanmar, Nepal, the Philippines, Sri Lanka, Singapore, Thailand, Vietnam, New Guinea and northern Queensland.
