= Alatiliparis =

Scientific classification
- Kingdom: Plantae
- Clade: Embryophytes
- Clade: Tracheophytes
- Clade: Spermatophytes
- Clade: Angiosperms
- Clade: Monocots
- Order: Asparagales
- Family: Orchidaceae
- Subfamily: Epidendroideae
- Tribe: Malaxideae
- Subtribe: Malaxidinae
- Genus: Alatiliparis; Marg. & Szlach.

Genus of orchids

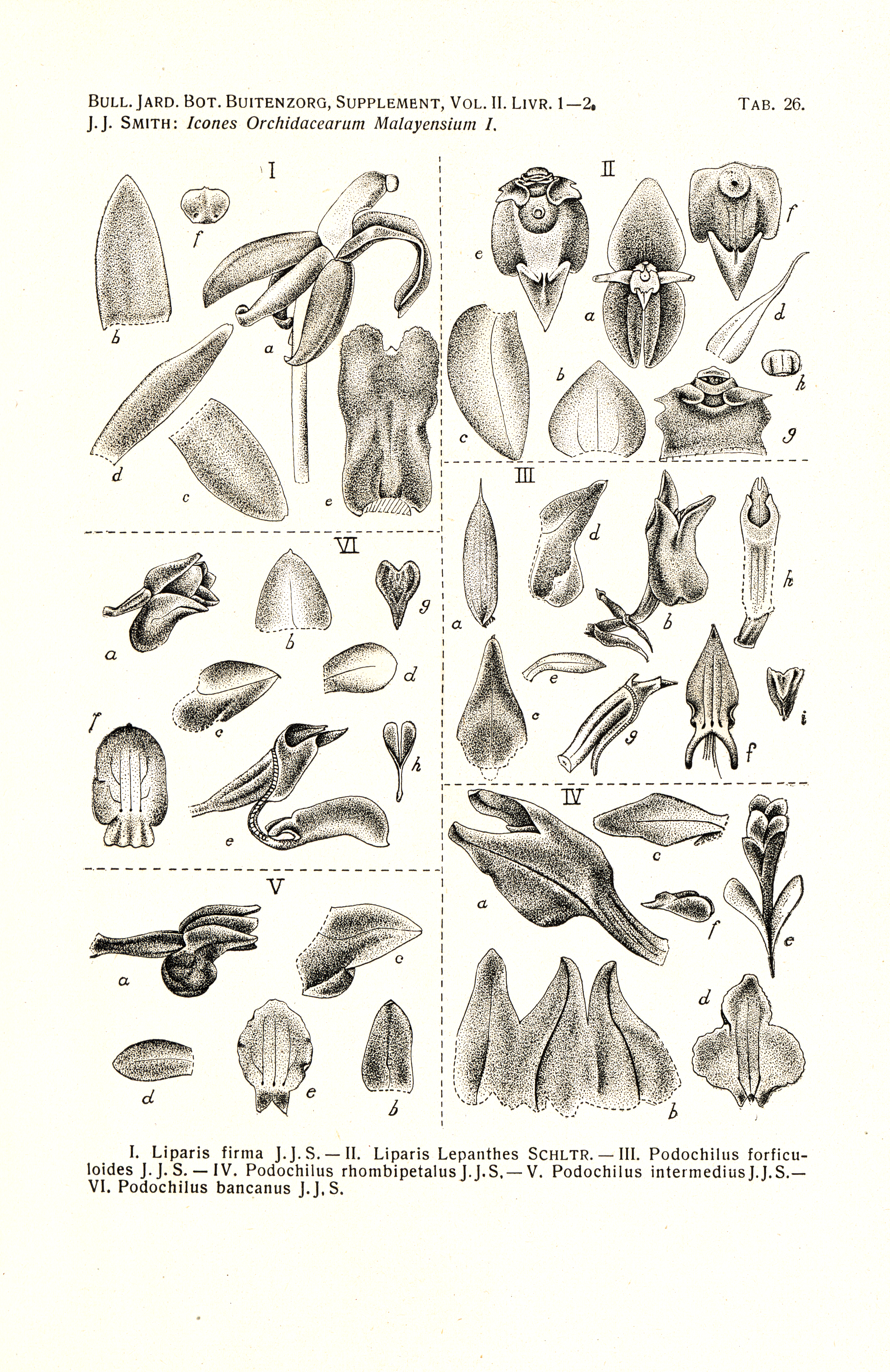
Sketches of Alatiliparis lepanthes (Section II)

Alatiliparis is a genus of orchids native to Java and Sumatra in Indonesia. It contains 5 currently recognized species (as of May 2014):

- Alatiliparis angustiflora (J.J.Sm.) Szlach. & Marg. - Sumatra and West Java
- Alatiliparis filicornes Marg. & Szlach. - Sumatra
- Alatiliparis lepanthes (Schltr.) Szlach. & Marg. - western Sumatra
- Alatiliparis otochilus Marg. & Szlach. - Sumatra
- Alatiliparis speculifera (J.J.Sm.) Szlach. & Marg.- western Java
