= Stichorkis =

Scientific classification
- Kingdom: Plantae
- Clade: Tracheophytes
- Clade: Angiosperms
- Clade: Monocots
- Order: Asparagales
- Family: Orchidaceae
- Subfamily: Epidendroideae
- Tribe: Malaxideae
- Subtribe: Malaxidinae
- Genus: Stichorkis; Thouars

Type species
- Stichorkis disticha (Thouars) Pfitzer in H.G.A.Engler & K.A.E.Prantl

Synonyms
- Distichis Thouars ex Lindl., invalid name; Disticholiparis Marg. & Szlach., illegitimate name

Genus of orchids

Stichorkis is a genus of orchids native to the Indian subcontinent, Southeast Asia, New Guinea, and various islands of the Pacific and Indian Oceans.

== Species ==
Dozens of names have been proposed for members of the genus, but at present (June 2014), only the following are recognized:

- Stichorkis compressa (Blume) J.J.Wood - Borneo, Java, Sumatra, Sulawesi, Malaysia, Philippines, Vietnam
- Stichorkis disticha (Thouars) Pfitzer in H.G.A.Engler & K.A.E.Prantl - Mauritius, Réunion, Comoros
- Stichorkis endertii (J.J.Sm.) J.J.Wood - Sabah
- Stichorkis gibbosa (Finet) J.J.Wood - India, Sri Lanka, Myanmar, Laos, Vietnam, Thailand, Malaysia, Indonesia, New Guinea, Solomons, Fiji, New Caledonia, Samoa, Vanuatu
- Stichorkis lingulata (Ames & C.Schweinf.) J.J.Wood - Sabah
- Stichorkis lobongensis (Ames) J.J.Wood - Sabah, Sarawak
- Stichorkis mucronata (Blume) J.J.Wood - Indonesia
- Stichorkis pandurata (Ames) J.J.Wood - Sabah, Sarawak
