= Crossoliparis =

Scientific classification
- Kingdom: Plantae
- Clade: Tracheophytes
- Clade: Angiosperms
- Clade: Monocots
- Order: Asparagales
- Family: Orchidaceae
- Subfamily: Epidendroideae
- Tribe: Malaxideae
- Subtribe: Malaxidinae
- Genus: Crossoliparis; Marg.
- Species: C. wendlandii

Binomial name
- Crossoliparis wendlandii (Rchb.f.) Marg.

Genus of flowering plants

Crossoliparis is a genus of flowering plants belonging to the family Orchidaceae. The only species is Crossoliparis wendlandii.

Its native range is Southern Mexico to Northern Venezuela.
