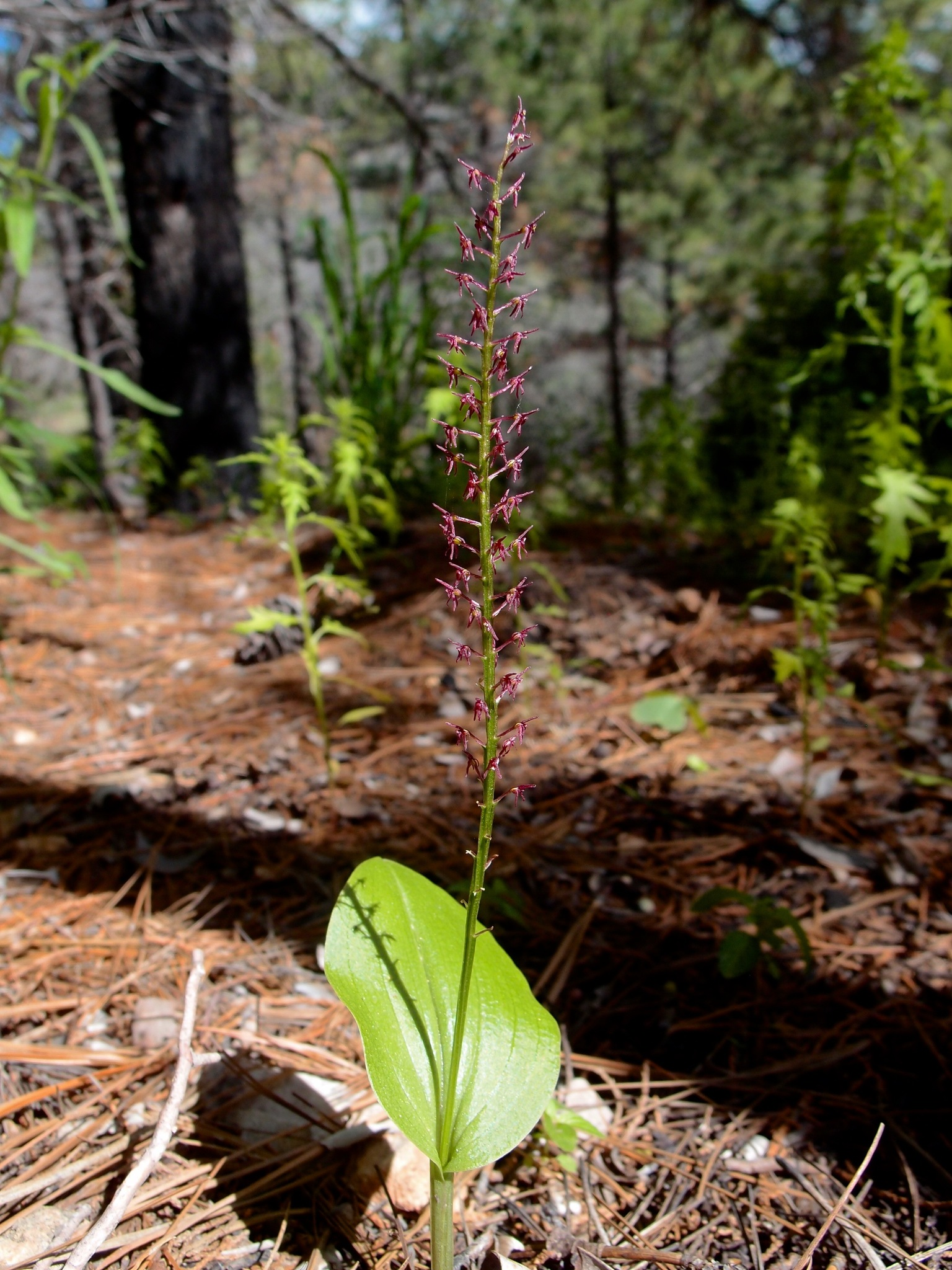
- Tamayorkis porphyrea in Sonora, Mexico

Scientific classification
- Kingdom: Plantae
- Clade: Tracheophytes
- Clade: Angiosperms
- Clade: Monocots
- Order: Asparagales
- Family: Orchidaceae
- Subfamily: Epidendroideae
- Tribe: Malaxideae
- Subtribe: Malaxidinae
- Genus: Tamayorkis; Szlach.

= Tamayorkis =

Genus of flowering plants

Tamayorkis is a genus of flowering plants belonging to the family Orchidaceae.

Its native range is from Arizona and New Mexico to Texas, USA and also Mexico and Guatemala in South America.

The genus name of Tamayorkis is in honour of Roberto González Tamayo (1940–2014), Mexican engineer, botanist, and professor at the University of Guadalajara. It was first described and published in Fragm. Florist. Geobot., Suppl. Vol.3 on page 121 in 1995.

== Known species ==
According to Kew:

- Tamayorkis ehrenbergii (Rchb.f.) R.González & Szlach.
- Tamayorkis hintonii (Todzia) R.González & Szlach.
- Tamayorkis porphyrea (Ridl.) Salazar & Soto Arenas
- Tamayorkis wendtii (Salazar) R.González & Szlach.
