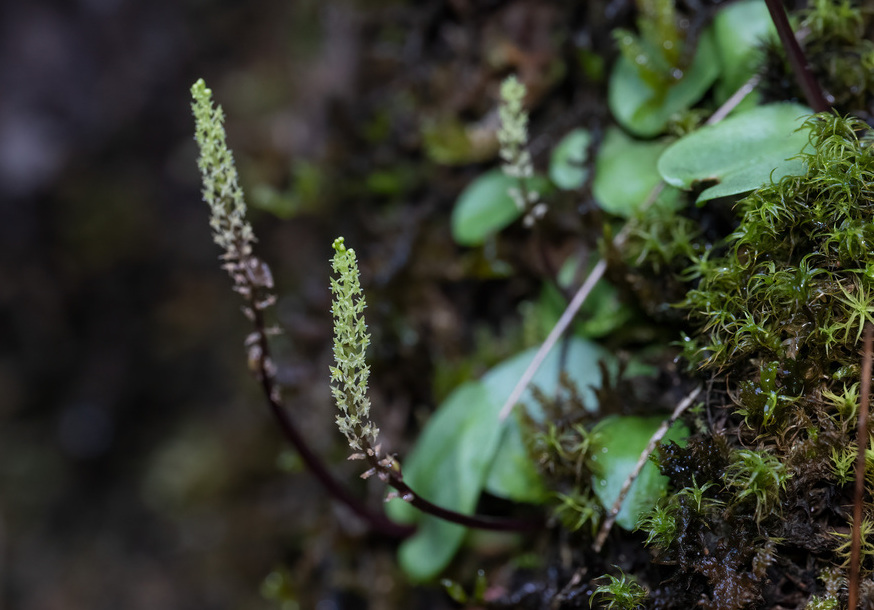
- Oberonioides pusillus

Scientific classification
- Kingdom: Plantae
- Clade: Tracheophytes
- Clade: Angiosperms
- Clade: Monocots
- Order: Asparagales
- Family: Orchidaceae
- Subfamily: Epidendroideae
- Tribe: Malaxideae
- Subtribe: Malaxidinae
- Genus: Oberonioides; Szlach.

Type species
- Oberonioides oberoniiflora (Seidenf.) Szlach.

= Oberonioides =

Genus of orchids

Oberonioides is a genus of orchids native to China and Thailand. Only two species are known:

- Oberonioides oberoniiflora (Seidenf.) Szlach. - Thailand
- Oberonioides pusillus (Rolfe) Marg. & Szlach. - Jiangxi, Fujian, Taiwan

The genus name of Oberonioides is derived from Oberon, a king of the fairies in medieval and Renaissance literature.

The genus was circumscribed by Dariusz Lucjan Szlachetko in Fragm. Florist. Geobot. Suppl. vol.3 on page 134 in 1995.
