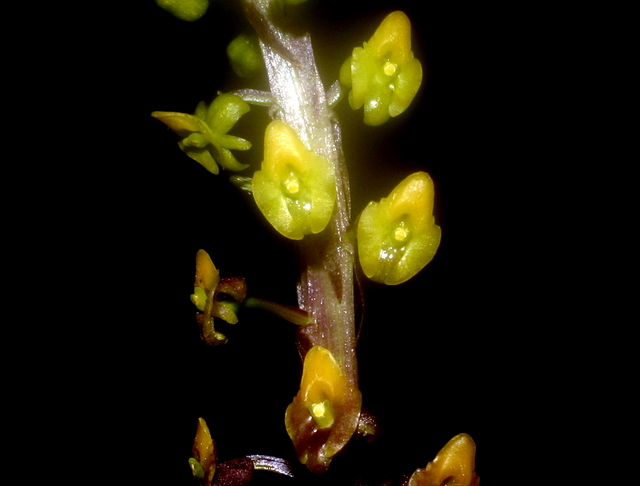

Scientific classification
- Kingdom: Plantae
- Clade: Embryophytes
- Clade: Tracheophytes
- Clade: Spermatophytes
- Clade: Angiosperms
- Clade: Monocots
- Order: Asparagales
- Family: Orchidaceae
- Subfamily: Epidendroideae
- Genus: Crepidium
- Species: C. tjiwideiense

Binomial name
- Crepidium tjiwideiense (Ames) Szlach. (1995)

= Crepidium tjiwideiense =

Species of orchid

Crepidium tjiwideiense is a species of the family Orchidaceae endemic to the Philippines.
