= Crepidium rheedei =

Scientific classification
- Kingdom: Plantae
- Clade: Tracheophytes
- Clade: Angiosperms
- Clade: Monocots
- Order: Asparagales
- Family: Orchidaceae
- Subfamily: Epidendroideae
- Genus: Crepidium
- Species: C. rheedei

Binomial name
- Crepidium rheedei Blume

Synonyms
- Crepidium blumei (Bakh.f.) Szlach.; Malaxis blumei Bakh.f.; Microstylis blumei Boerl. & J.J.Sm., nom. illeg.; Microstylis rheedei (Blume) Wight, nom. illeg.

Species of plant

Crepidium rheedei is a species of flowering plant in the family Orchidaceae, native to Borneo, Java, Peninsular Malaysia and the Philippines. It was first described by Carl Ludwig Blume in 1825.

== Subspecies ==
As of December 2023, Plants of the World Online accepted two subspecies:

- Crepidium rheedei subsp. purpureiflorum (Ames & Quisumb.) Marg., syn. Crepidium purpureiflorum
- Crepidium rheedei subsp. rheedei
