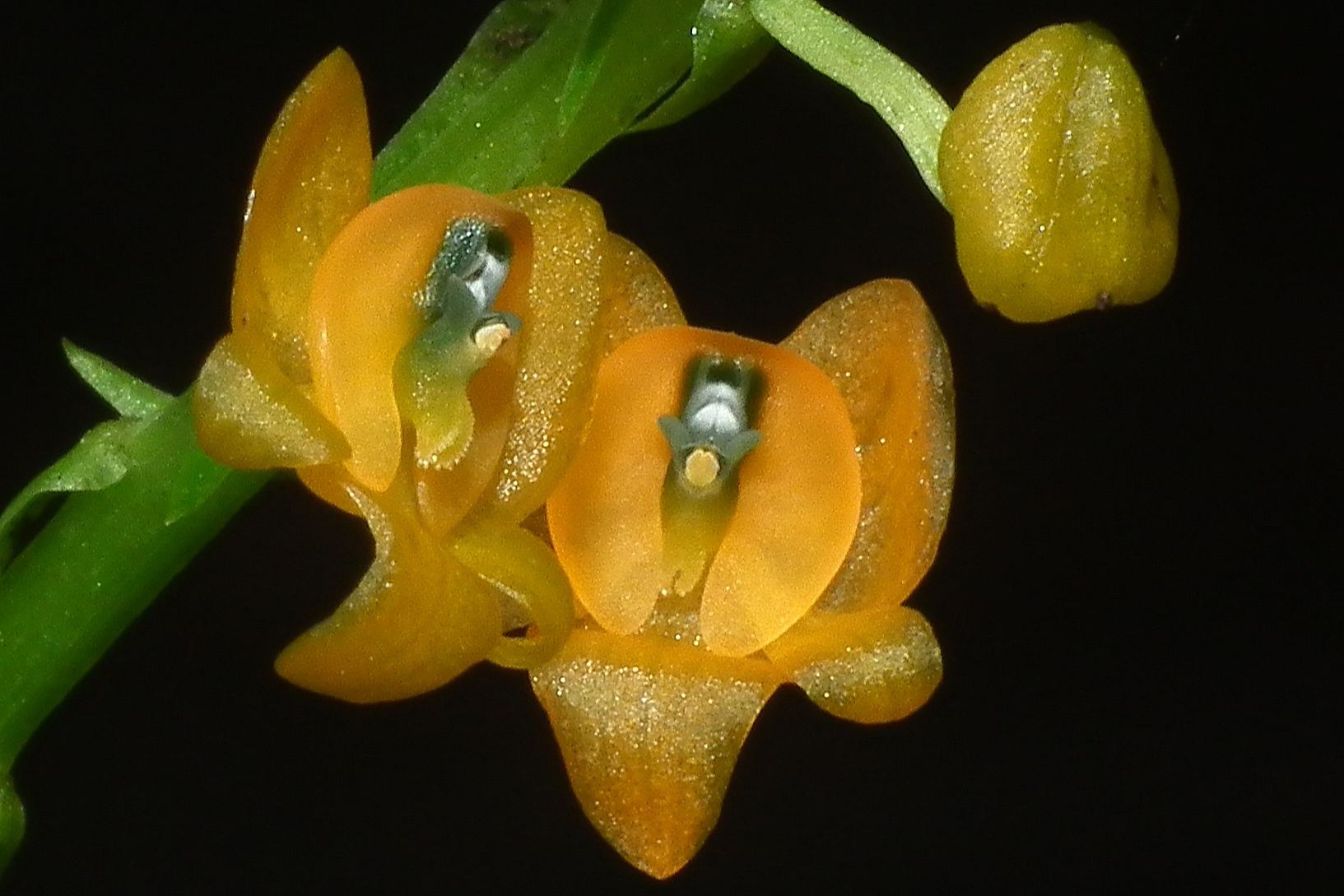

Scientific classification
- Kingdom: Plantae
- Clade: Embryophytes
- Clade: Tracheophytes
- Clade: Spermatophytes
- Clade: Angiosperms
- Clade: Monocots
- Order: Asparagales
- Family: Orchidaceae
- Subfamily: Epidendroideae
- Genus: Crepidium
- Species: C. moluccanum

Binomial name
- Crepidium moluccanum (J.J.Sm.) Ormerod

Synonyms
- Crepidium ramosii (Ames) Szlach.; Malaxis moluccana (J.J.Sm.) Ames & C.Schweinf.; Malaxis ramosii Ames; Microstylis moluccana J.J.Sm.; Pseudoliparis moluccana (J.J.Sm.) Marg.; Pseudoliparis ramosii (Ames) Marg. & Szlach.

= Crepidium moluccanum =

Species of orchid

Crepidium moluccanum, synonym Crepidium ramosii, is a species of plant in the family Orchidaceae endemic to the Philippines.
