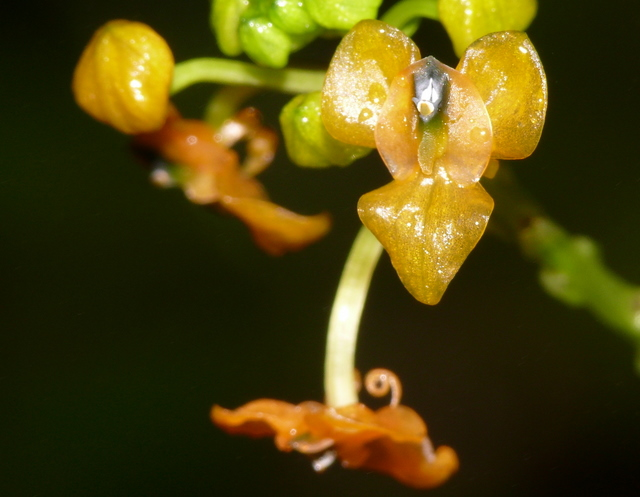

Scientific classification
- Kingdom: Plantae
- Clade: Embryophytes
- Clade: Tracheophytes
- Clade: Spermatophytes
- Clade: Angiosperms
- Clade: Monocots
- Order: Asparagales
- Family: Orchidaceae
- Subfamily: Epidendroideae
- Genus: Crepidium
- Species: C. uncatum

Binomial name
- Crepidium uncatum (Ames) Szlach. (1995)

= Crepidium uncatum =

Species of orchid

Crepidium uncatum is a member of the family Orchidaceae, endemic to the Philippines.
