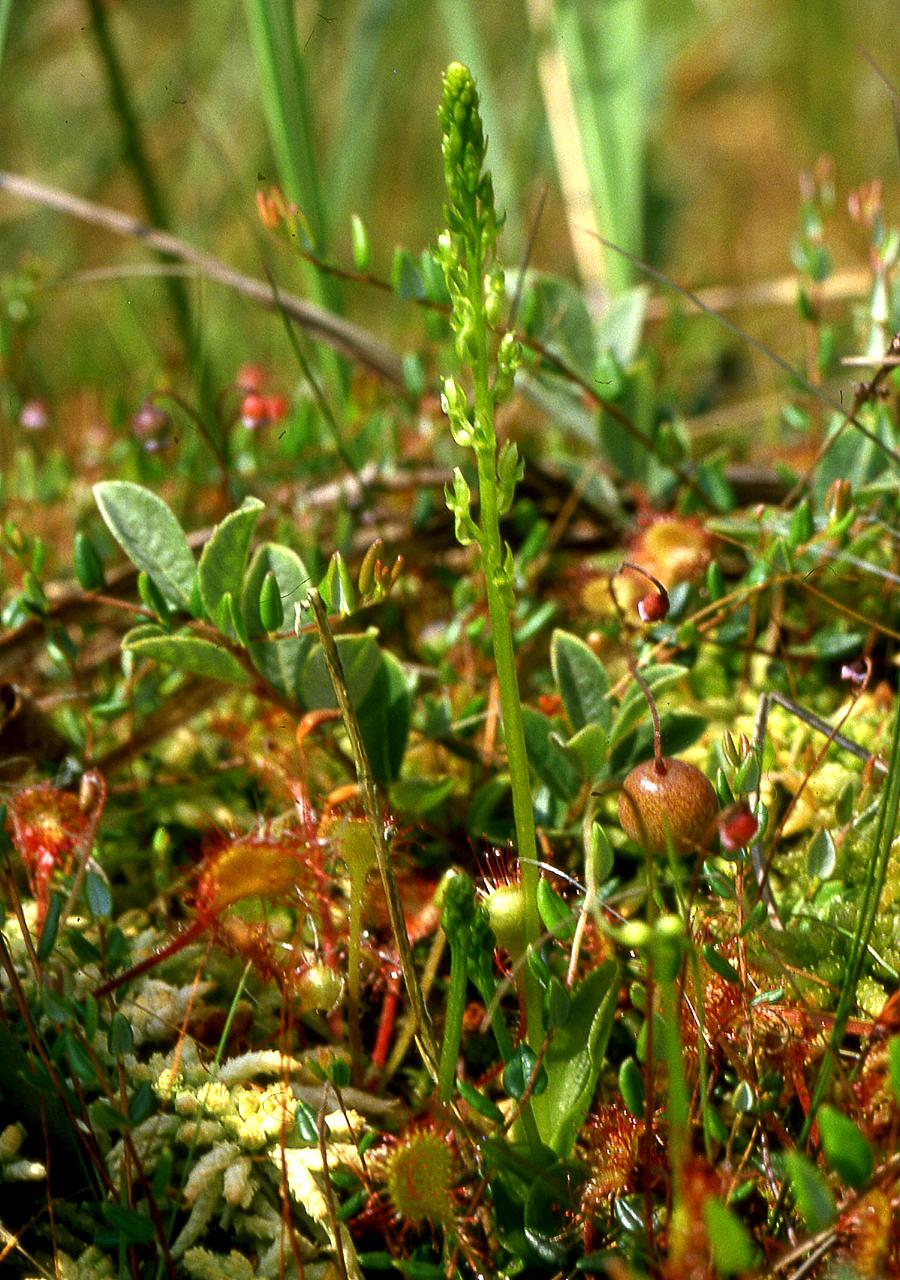

Conservation status
- Least Concern (IUCN 3.1)

- Vulnerable (NatureServe)

Scientific classification
- Kingdom: Plantae
- Clade: Embryophytes
- Clade: Tracheophytes
- Clade: Spermatophytes
- Clade: Angiosperms
- Clade: Monocots
- Order: Asparagales
- Family: Orchidaceae
- Subfamily: Epidendroideae
- Tribe: Malaxideae
- Subtribe: Malaxidinae
- Genus: Hammarbya; Kuntze
- Species: H. paludosa

Binomial name
- Hammarbya paludosa (L.) Kuntze

Synonyms
- Synonyms (8): Malaxis paludosa (L.) Sw.; Ophrys paludosa L.; Orchis paludosa (L.) Pall.; Epipactis paludosa (L.) F.W.Schmidt; Sturmia paludosa (L.) Rchb. in J.C.Mössler & H.G.L.Reichenbach; Ophrys palustris Huds.; Malaxis palustris (Huds.) Rich.; Hammarbya paludosa var. robusta Verm.

= Hammarbya =

Bog adder's-mouth orchid

Genus of orchids

Hammarbya is a genus in the orchid family (Orchidaceae) containing the single species Hammarbya paludosa, commonly known as the bog orchid, bog adder's-mouth or bog adder's-mouth orchid. It is known for being the only epiphytic orchid native to northern North America and for being the only orchid to produce plantlets on the tips of its leaves. It is also called Malaxis paludosa by some authorities who included it within the closely related genus Malaxis.

A small, short-lived perennial, H. paludosa flowers every one or two years for about a month at the end of summer and is pollinated by fungus gnats and other small flies. Like many orchids, it requires a fungal associate to germinate, and mature plants continue to obtain some of their nutrients from the fungal partner. The species is widely distributed across the Circumboreal Region in Europe, Asia, and North America, where it grows primarily in bogs. Many populations are small and geographically isolated, and the total number of plants is in decline due to habitat loss and degradation. Although assessed as a Least-concern species by the IUCN, H. paludosa is considered threatened or endangered through much of its range.

Carl Linnaeus first described the species in his seminal work, Species Plantarum. The name Hammarbya, later proposed by Otto Kuntze, refers to Linnaeus's summer residence, Linnaeus's Hammarby. Charles Darwin discussed this species in his 1862 book Fertilisation of Orchids, using its unusual floral structure in his study of orchid evolution.

== Description ==
=== Vegetative morphology ===
Hammarbya paludosa is a small herbaceous perennial growing 3–23 cm (1.2–9.1 in) tall. Most plants have very fine, hair-like roots attached to a short rhizome, although some plants have no roots and others have one to four roots up to 4 cm (1.6 in) long. At the base of the stem, there is a pseudobulb, 4–8 mm (0.2–0.3 in) in diameter, replaced every few years by a new pseudobulb that grows from a renewal bud near its base.

Plants have two to three elliptic basal leaves, or occasionally four. The leaves are 1–3 cm (0.4–1 in) long and 0.5–1 cm (0.2–0.4 in) wide, hairless, pale green or yellow-green, and have edges that curl inward. In the summer, the leaves bear 2–40 (or sometimes 0) small bud-like vegetative offspring called gemmae, each 0.5–3 mm (0.02–0.1 in) long.

=== Floral morphology ===
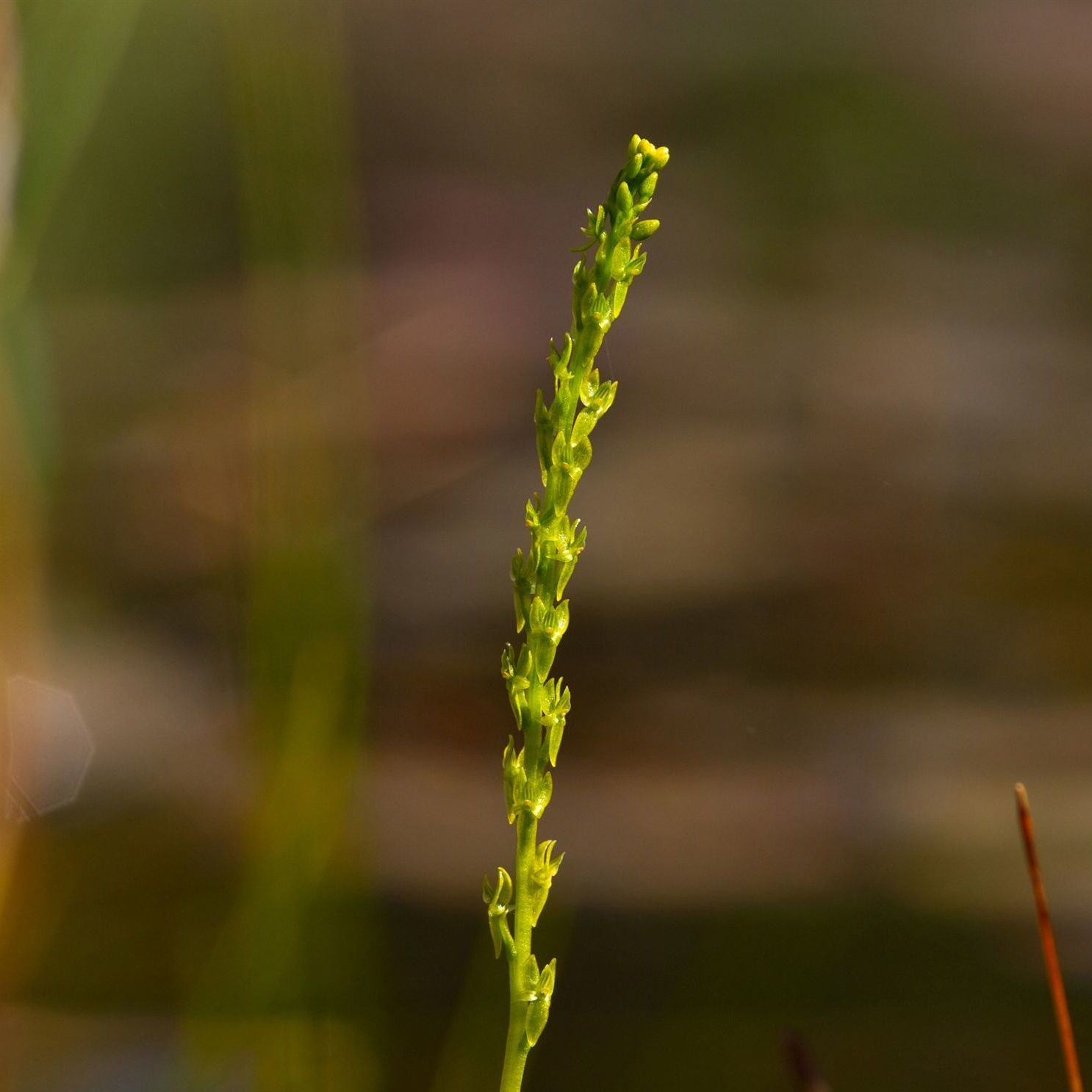
An inflorescence, with the flowers near the base opening first and some flowers near the apex still in bud

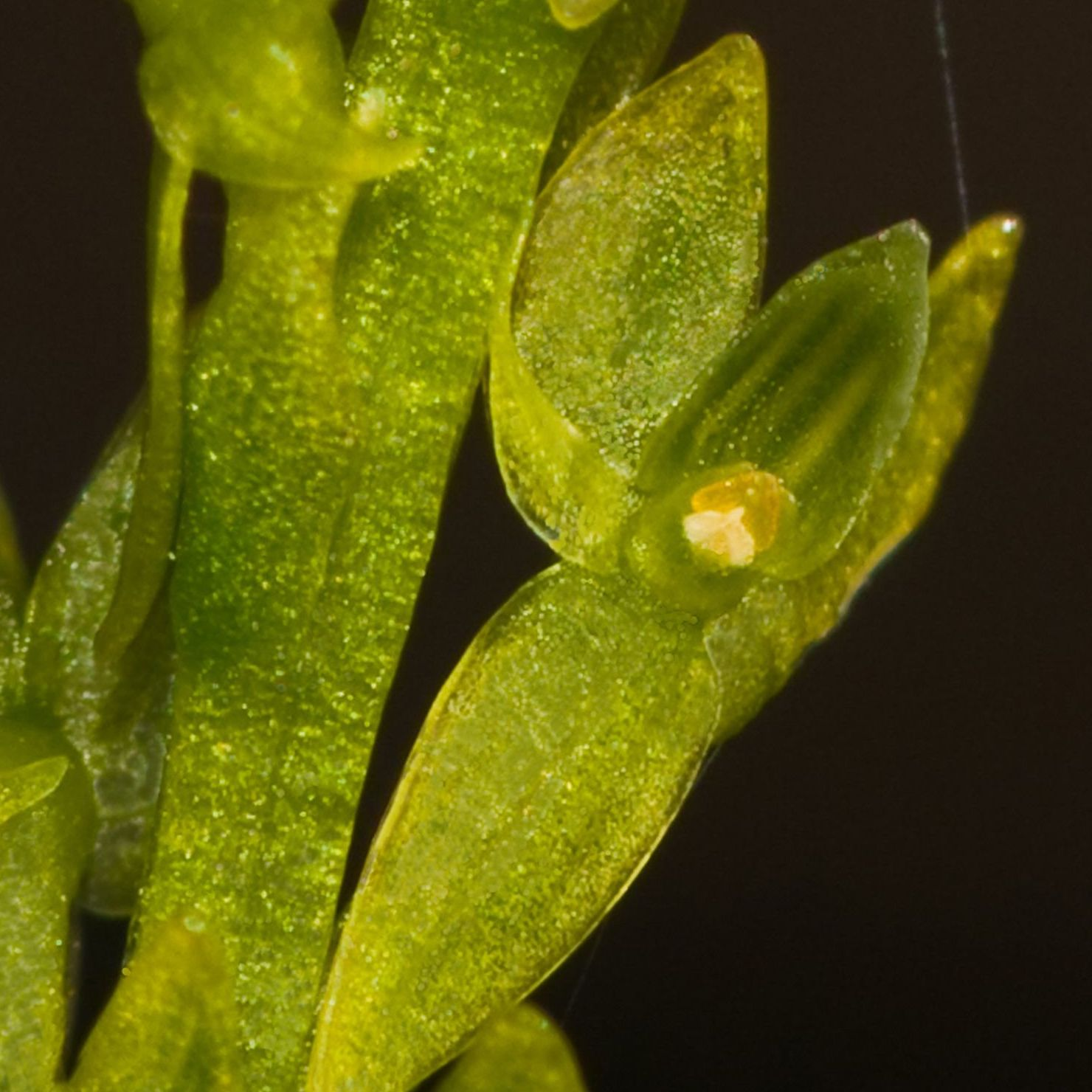
A single flower, with the yellow-and-green striped lip pointing upward and the much larger dorsal sepal pointing downward

The inflorescence is arranged as a raceme on a flowering stem that is 3–10 cm (1.2–3.9 in) (or less commonly up to 25 cm (9.8 in)) long and 3–5-angled. Each inflorescence bears 2–55 flowers, with most having 5–20 flowers. Individual flowers are small and greenish, about 2 mm (0.08 in) wide and 4 mm (0.2 in) tall, and subtended by a narrow bract, 2–3 mm (0.08–0.1 in) long. The flowers have a sweet, cucumber-like scent.

As with other orchids, each flower has three sepals and three petals, one of which is modified to form a lip. Unlike most orchids, the pedicel that attaches the flower to the stem has a 360° twist so that the lip points upward. All of the sepals and petals are entirely green except the lip, which is yellow with green stripes. The lip is 1.2–1.8 mm (0.047–0.071 in) long and 0.7–1 mm (0.03–0.04 in) wide with a pointed tip, and the lateral petals have similar dimensions but curve backward toward the stem. The sepals are larger, measuring 2–2.5 mm (0.08–0.1 in) long and 1–1.6 mm (0.04–0.06 in) wide. The lateral sepals have acuminate tips and point upward, and the dorsal sepal has an obtuse tip and points downward.

In orchids, the reproductive parts of the flower are fused in a structure called the column. The column in a H. paludosa flower is 0.5–0.7 mm (0.02–0.03 in) in length and width and is oriented vertically, situated directly under the lip. Each of the two anthers holds a pair of yellow pollen sacs called pollinia, which are held together by a viscid substance.

The fruit is a capsule, 3–4 mm (0.1–0.2 in) long, containing seeds nearly microscopic in size, 232–236 μm (9.13–9.29 thou) long and 173–206 μm (6.81–8.11 thou) wide. The diploid chromosome number is 2n = 28.

== Taxonomy ==
The species epithet paludosa is Latin for 'boggy' and refers to the plant's habitat. Its common names include bog orchid, bog adder's-mouth, and bog adder's-mouth orchid.

Carl Linnaeus formally described the species in his 1753 book Species Plantarum, giving it the name Ophrys paludosa. His description was based on specimens growing in the peat bogs of Sweden. As orchid taxonomy developed during the late eighteenth and early nineteenth centuries, various authors placed the species in the genera Orchis (Pallas in 1776), Epipactis (Schmidt in 1795), Malaxis (Swartz in 1800), and Sturmia (Reichenbach in 1829), the last of which is now considered a synonym of Liparis. In 1891, Otto Kuntze moved it to a new genus of its own, named Hammarbya after Linnaeus's summer residence Hammarby. The plant's production of gemmae is unique among related genera and has been given as the justification for placing the species in its own genus. Some taxonomic authorities, including Plants of the World Online, accept the name H. paludosa, while others, including Flora of North America, include it in the genus Malaxis.

Hammarbya paludosa belongs to a tribe within the orchid family known as Malaxideae. The taxonomy of Malaxideae is controversial, and molecular phylogenetics have shown that many of the genera are paraphyletic. Moreover, genetic material from H. paludosa has not been analyzed, and its position within the tribe needs further study, although some authors have placed the species in the subtribe Malaxidinae along with the closely-related genera Malaxis and Liparis.

Because there is no significant morphological variation across its geographic range, no infraspecific taxa are currently recognized.

== Distribution and habitat ==
=== Distribution ===
A range map showing countries, states, provinces, and other administrative divisions where Hammarbya paludosa has been documented as extant (green) or extirpated (red)

Hammarbya paludosa has a circumboreal distribution, occurring through the northern parts of Europe, Asia, and North America. Despite its extensive range, there are large gaps in its known range, which can be explained both by its rarity in some areas and by the difficulty in detecting populations. Whether the fragmented populations represent relicts of a once-wider distribution or result from long-distance dispersal events remains unknown.

In Europe, the largest numbers of this plant occur in Scandinavia, the Netherlands, Belgium, the Baltic states, and northwestern Russia. Scattered populations are present as far west as France and the British Isles and as far south as the Italian Alps and Romania. It is now considered extirpated in Bulgaria. Near the southern edges of its range in Europe, the plant occurs at higher altitudes, up to 1,500 metres (4,900 ft). In Ireland, about 30 known populations are scattered around the coast; in Great Britain, the plant is common in the Scottish Highlands, the Lake District, and North and Mid Wales but has become uncommon in England due to the draining of peatlands. Around 60 populations persist in the New Forest and 15 in the Dorset Heaths.

In Russia, the distribution of H. paludosa spreads eastward to Siberia and the Russian Far East, including the Sakhalin and Kuril Islands. There are also ten known populations in Japan. Its range in central Asia extends southward to Kazakhstan.

H. paludosa is extremely rare throughout its range in North America. The first record of the plant in North America occurred in Alaska in 1895. In Canada, its distribution stretches across the Yukon, the Northwest Territories, British Columbia, Alberta, Saskatchewan, Manitoba, and Ontario. The southernmost populations in North America occur in Minnesota, in scattered populations of no more than 20 plants. The elevational range in North America is 10–300 m (30–1,000 ft), though one population at Buckskin Glacier was recorded at 766 m (2,510 ft).

=== Habitat ===
Hammarbya paludosa grows in bogs and conifer swamps and very rarely on dry ground. In the southern parts of its range, the plant grows in deep shade, possibly reflecting its requirement for cool conditions. The plants often grow on sphagnum or feather mosses (in the order Hypnales), both on floating sphagnum mats and perched on hummocks. Lateral movement of water through the habitat, facilitated by small streams, ditches, or wet slopes, keeps the mossy substrate saturated.

The plant is an acidophile, typically growing in acidic conditions but sometimes occurring in marginal or alkaline habitats; the soil pH across the plant's European distribution ranges from 4.5 to 7.5. The availability of nutrients such as calcium, nitrogen, and phosphorus varies widely across habitats, and a Russian study suggests that nutrient abundance does not directly affect the plant's vigor.

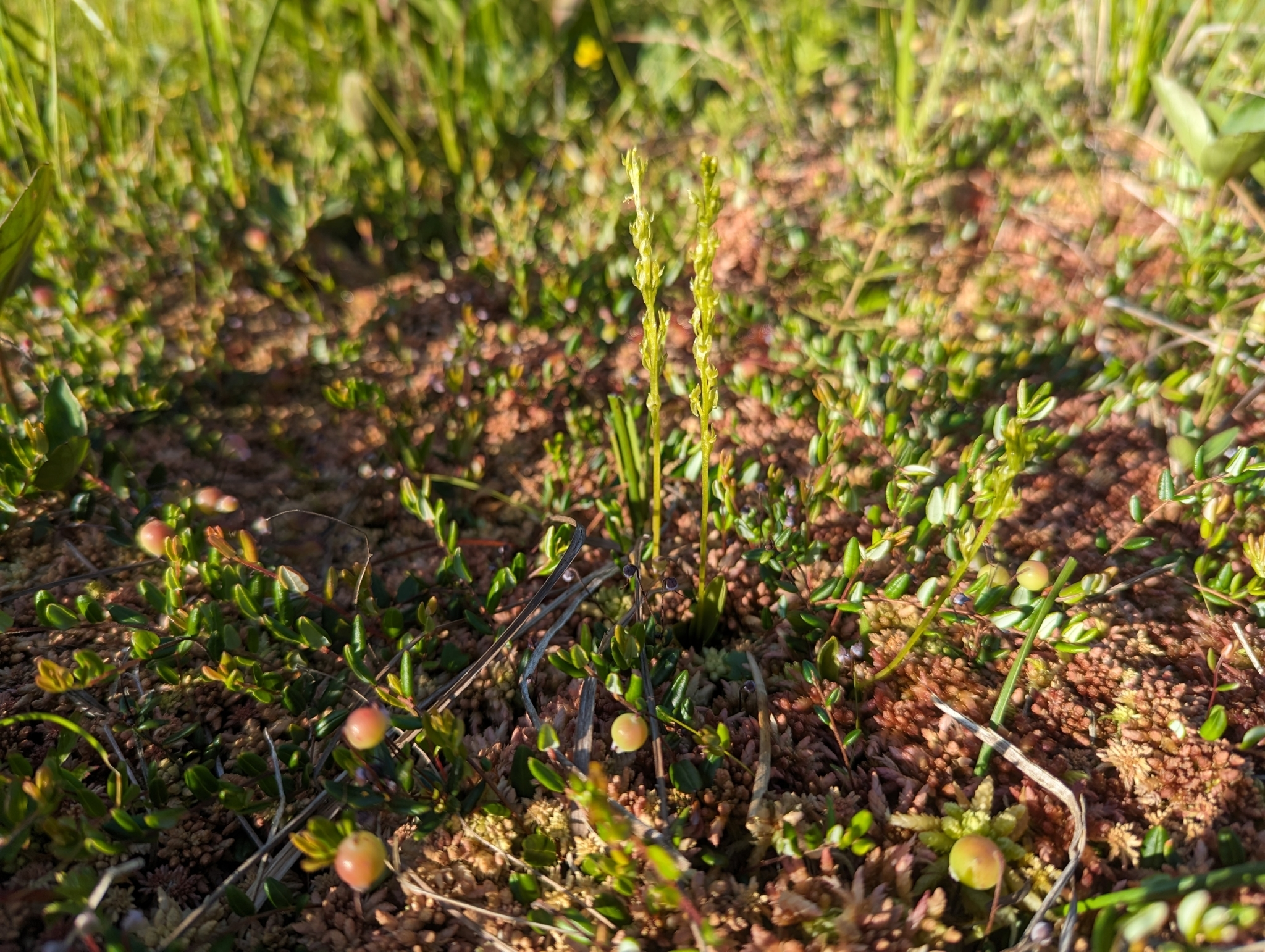
Hammarbya paludosa growing in a bog in Austria with Sphagnum and Vaccinium oxycoccos, two frequently associated species

Across its range, H. paludosa is associated with bog communities, including Carex, Eriophorum, Drosera, and ericaceous plants such as Vaccinium oxycoccos, Gaultheria hispidula, and Myrica gale. In northern Minnesota, populations occur in rich conifer swamps forested by Picea mariana, Thuja occidentalis, Larix laricina, or Abies balsamea and a limited number of shrubs and other herbaceous plants.

== Ecology ==
=== Growth form ===
There are multiple interpretations of how to classify H. paludosa in the Raunkiær system. In most habitats, the renewal bud sits at the soil surface, making the plant a hemicryptophyte. When it grows in sphagnum hummocks, the plants have been identified as geophytes (because the renewal bud sits below the surface of the substrate) or, alternatively, as epiphytes (because the plant is growing entirely on another plant). The second interpretation has led some authors to describe H. paludosa as the only epiphytic orchid native to Europe and northern North America.

The rhizome is oriented vertically, possibly facilitating the plant's ability to adapt to changes in the surface level of bogs as the surrounding sphagnum moss grows.

=== Life history ===
A 2014 study in western Russia found that plants remain vegetative for their first three years and flower intermittently during the following three to five years, with gaps of one or two years between flowering events. The pseudobulb lives only one to two years (rarely up to five years). Occasionally, plants spread vegetatively, with up to five renewal buds producing multiple new pseudobulbs. The short lifespan of the pseudobulb has led researchers to suggest that the plants overall may be short-lived.

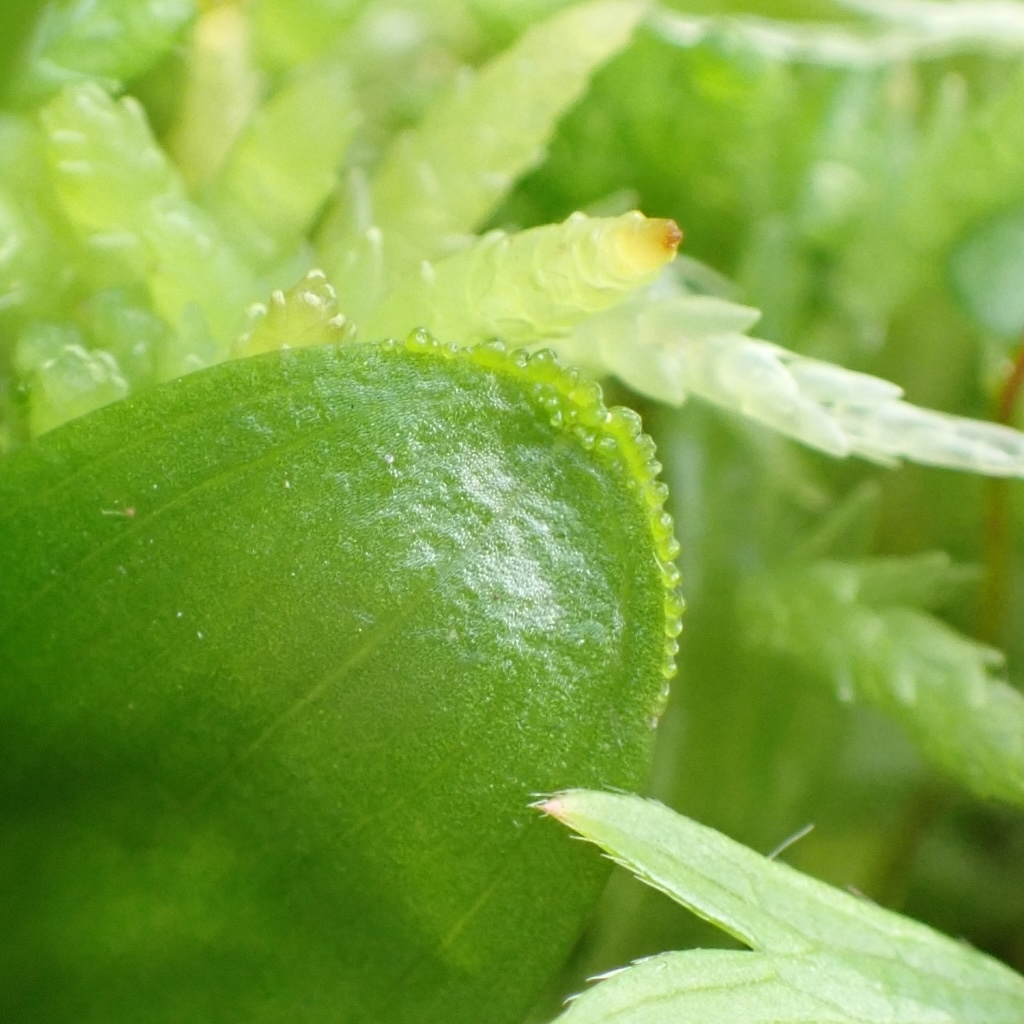
Gemmae developing along a leaf margin on a mature plant

Hammarbya paludosa reproduces sexually, through pollination, and asexually, by producing small buds called gemmae along its leaf margins that drop off and develop into new plants. It is the only species of orchid known to reproduce in this way. The relative importance of vegetative and sexual reproduction remains unknown.

Flowering occurs from July to late August across the plant's entire range, and fruiting occurs from August to September. The flowers at the base of the inflorescence open first and remain open for the entire blooming period, approximately 4–5 weeks. In contrast, the flowers near the top of the inflorescence only bloom for a few days. After flowering, the lip wilts, but the sepals and lateral petals remain green, possibly to increase the photosynthetic capacity of the plant.

The proportion of plants setting fruit has varied across studies, between 0% and 90%. This proportion varies within a population across time, with 64% of plants in one Minnesota population producing 4–7 fruits in 1983 followed by only 22% in 1984. The same Minnesota study found that 34–39% of fruit were eaten, presumably by rodents and insects. The germination rate and seed dormancy period of H. paludosa are unknown.

=== Pollination ===
Whether H. paludosa is self-compatible is unknown, though a 1984 study in Minnesota showed that pollinated flowers produced fruit, while plants that had been bagged to prevent pollination by insects did not. It is expected that the flowers are pollinated by small flies, including fungus gnats. Indeed, the 1984 pollination study in Minnesota identified a male fungus gnat of the species Phronia digitata with two H. paludosa pollen sacs attached to its thorax and also noted that mosquitoes, despite collecting nectar from the flowers, were too large to come into contact with the flower's reproductive parts. A 1995 study in France identified Sciara thomae as a pollinator. In a majority of plants observed in the Minnesota study, the pollen sacs had been removed.

=== Fungal associations ===
Like all orchids, H. paludosa relies on fungal partners to obtain nutrients during at least part of its life cycle. Seeds require infection by soil fungi to germinate. Similarly, the gemmae do not carry fungi from the mother plant, and it has been theorized that they must be infected by mycorrhizal fungi to survive. As plants develop, they retain their mycorrhizal associations, hosting fungi in their roots, rhizomes, leaf bases, and hairs; where the plants host fungi varies across individuals. The fungal associates of H. paludosa, including members of the genera Tulasnella and Meliniomyces as well as the species Ceratobasidium cornigerum and Varicosporium elodeae, also differ across populations. All of the known mycorrhizal partners of H. paludosa also form partnerships with other plant species. Because of these shared fungal associates, together with evidence from isotope analysis consistent with mixotrophy, researchers have suggested that H. paludosa may obtain some of its carbon from other plants via a fungal network.

== Conservation ==
Although the IUCN Red List classifies H. paludosa as being of least concern, the plant is declining across its European range and is rare in North America. NatureServe considers the species globally threatened. Many jurisdictions across its distribution confer conservation statuses to the species, reflecting threats to its continued existence in parts of its range.

The European Union considers H. paludosa a species of least concern within Europe. Major threats in Europe include habitat loss due to mining and changes to hydrology, leading to habitat fragmentation. For example, in Pomerania, a 2010 study found that only seven of 21 historical populations in the region remained, and the gap between extant populations in the region and the closest populations in neighboring Germany was increasing. Although the species remains common in Scotland, the drainage of peatlands and livestock grazing practices have eliminated many populations in Great Britain, leading to losses of 61% of populations in Britain and 66% of populations in Ireland since 1500. It is considered Nationally Scarce in Britain, near threatened in Ireland, and endangered in Wales. Since 1986, the number of flowering individuals in Denmark, where the species is considered endangered, has decreased continuously. The species is also considered endangered in Switzerland, Germany, Ukraine, and Bulgaria and critically threatened in the Czech Republic.

It is generally rare in North America and is listed as vulnerable, imperiled, or critically endangered in all states and provinces where it occurs except Alaska. Research is needed to assess threats to the species, its dispersal mechanisms, and its distribution. In Minnesota, the plant was listed as endangered in 1984, and the few documented populations are isolated and consist of fewer than 20 plants each. Known threats there include changes in hydrology and damage to the habitat from construction and ditching.

== Significance to evolutionary biology ==
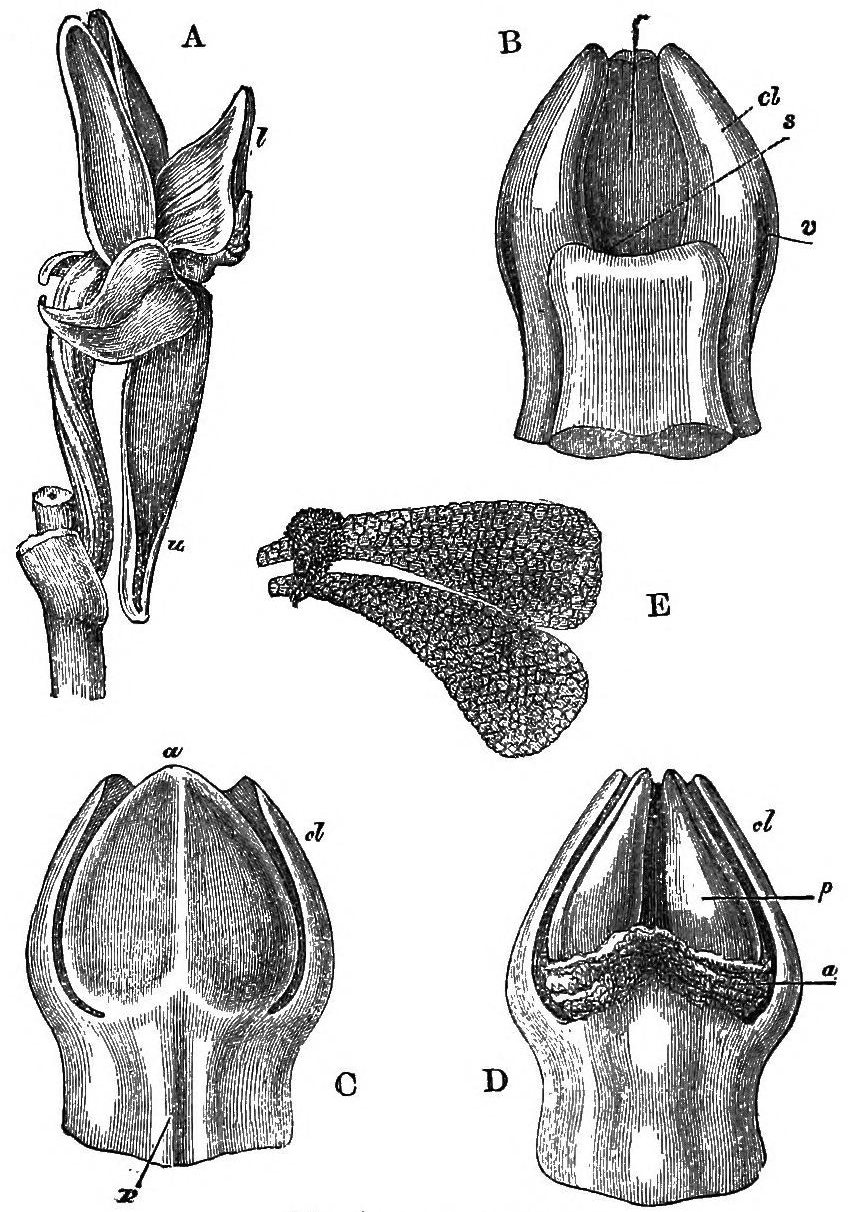
A figure from Fertilisation of Orchids, illustrating the twisted pedicels and other floral characters of Hammarbya paludosa

In the majority of orchids, the flowers are resupinate, twisting 180° during development so that the lip points downward. In Hammarbya, the flowers twist a further 180° so that the lip once more points upwards. Orchids in the genus Catasetum similarly have upward-pointing lips without any rotation. From this observation, Charles Darwin concluded in his 1862 book Fertilisation of Orchids that Hammarbya and Catasetum evolved from resupinate ancestors by twisting their flowers in opposite directions. He further interpreted the two different evolutionary paths to achieving the same floral orientation as evidence that variation arose from chance, rather than by need or by rational design. This sparked a famous public debate between Darwin and the botanist Asa Gray, who believed that God guided the variations on which natural selection acted.
