= Orestias elegans (plant) =

Scientific classification
- Kingdom: Plantae
- Clade: Tracheophytes
- Clade: Angiosperms
- Clade: Monocots
- Order: Asparagales
- Family: Orchidaceae
- Subfamily: Epidendroideae
- Genus: Orestias
- Species: O. elegans

Binomial name
- Orestias elegans Ridl., 1887

Species of orchid

Orestias elegans is a species of orchid. It is found in São Tomé and Príncipe. It is the type species of its genus.
