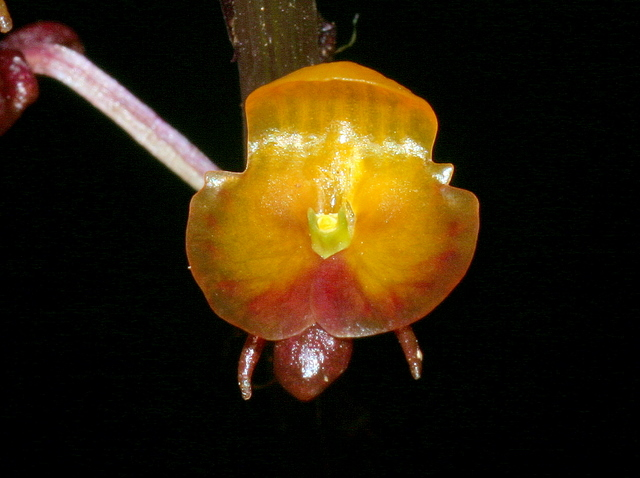

Scientific classification
- Kingdom: Plantae
- Clade: Embryophytes
- Clade: Tracheophytes
- Clade: Spermatophytes
- Clade: Angiosperms
- Clade: Monocots
- Order: Asparagales
- Family: Orchidaceae
- Subfamily: Epidendroideae
- Genus: Crepidium
- Species: C. binabayense

Binomial name
- Crepidium binabayense (Ames) Szlach. (1995)

= Crepidium binabayense =

Species of orchid

Crepidium binabayense is a member of the family Orchidaceae, endemic to the Philippines.

== Distribution and habitat ==
Found on Samar Island and Mindoro Island of the Philippines.
