= Pihla-Kaibaldi Nature Reserve =

Protected area in Estonia

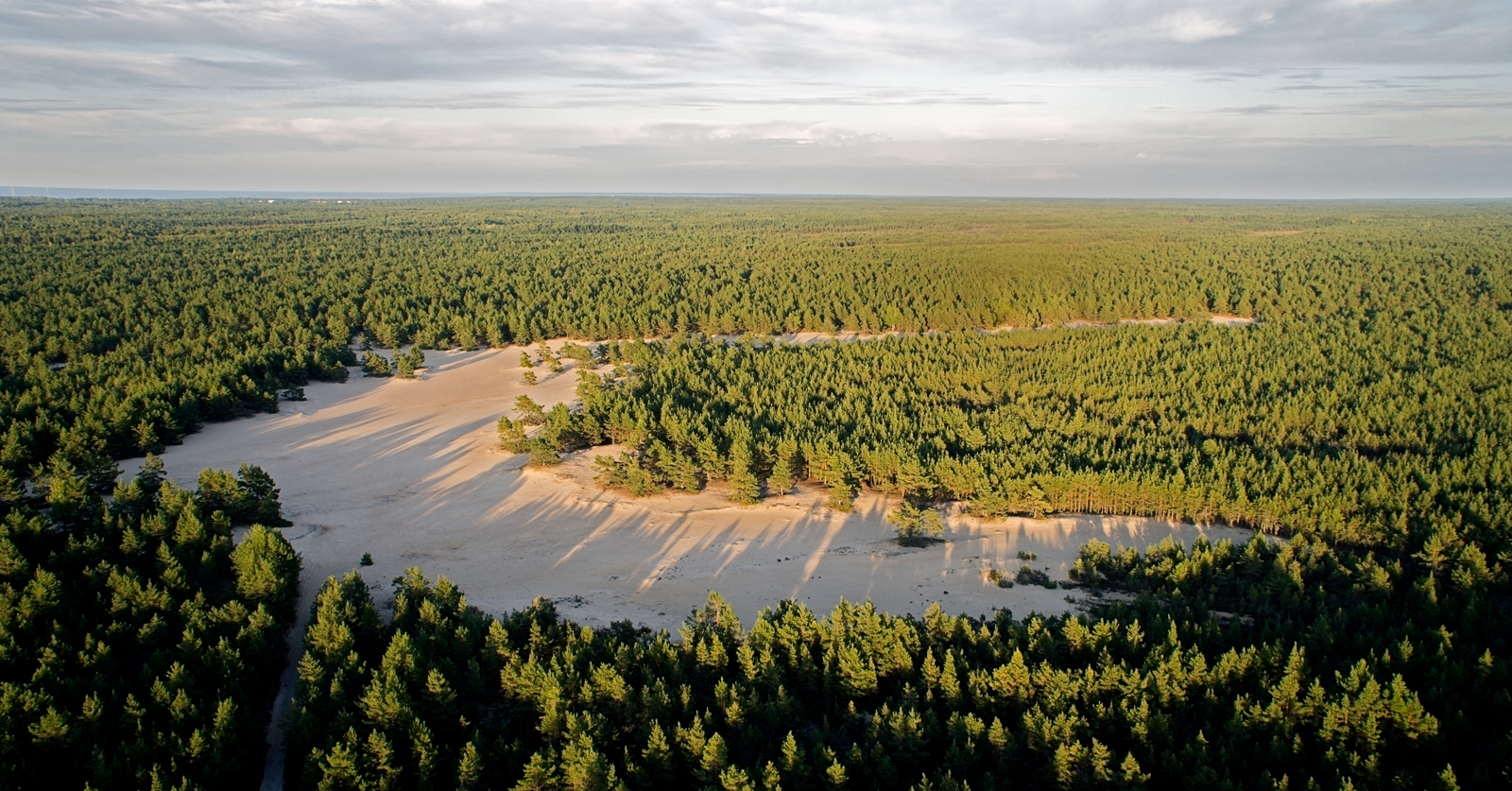

- Location within Estonia
- Location: Estonia
- Nearest city: Kärdla
- Coordinates: 58°55′43″N 22°39′38″E
- Area: 3,780 ha (9,300 acres)

Pihla-Kaibaldi Nature Reserve is a nature reserve situated on Hiiumaa in western Estonia, in Hiiu County.

The nature reserve protects a variety of landscape types, like forested sand dunes, several different types of bogs and swamp woods. Estonia's largest area of loose sand (14 ha (35 acres)) is located in the reserve. The nature reserve is an important habitat for several threatened species, e.g. Bog Orchid, Fly Orchid and Brown Beak-Sedge.
