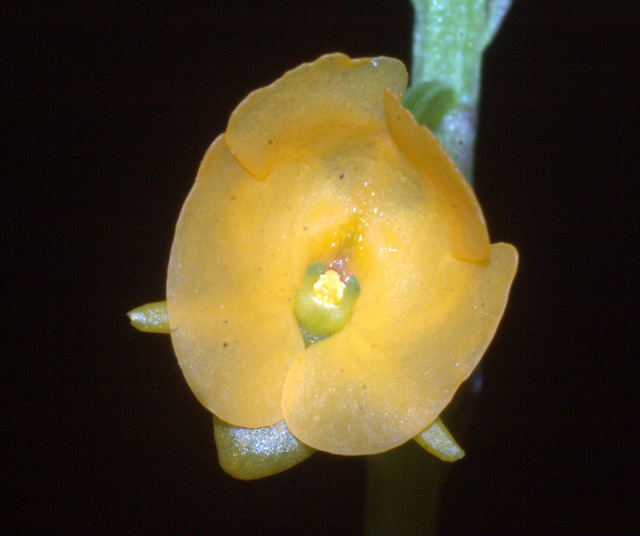

Scientific classification
- Kingdom: Plantae
- Clade: Embryophytes
- Clade: Tracheophytes
- Clade: Spermatophytes
- Clade: Angiosperms
- Clade: Monocots
- Order: Asparagales
- Family: Orchidaceae
- Subfamily: Epidendroideae
- Genus: Crepidium
- Species: C. quadrilobum

Binomial name
- Crepidium quadrilobum (Ames) Szlach. (1995)

= Crepidium quadrilobum =

Species of orchid

Crepidium quadrilobum is a species of plant in the family Orchidaceae, endemic to the Philippines.
