= Hippeophyllum =

Scientific classification
- Kingdom: Plantae
- Clade: Tracheophytes
- Clade: Angiosperms
- Clade: Monocots
- Order: Asparagales
- Family: Orchidaceae
- Subfamily: Epidendroideae
- Tribe: Malaxideae
- Subtribe: Malaxidinae
- Genus: Hippeophyllum; Schltr. in K.M.Schumann & C.A.G.Lauterbach

Genus of orchids

Hippeophyllum is a genus of flowering plants from the orchid family, Orchidaceae. It is native to New Guinea, insular Southeast Asia, and the Solomon Islands.

1. Hippeophyllum alboviride J.J.Sm. - New Guinea
2. Hippeophyllum biakenae J.J.Sm. - New Guinea
3. Hippeophyllum celebicum Schltr. - Sulawesi
4. Hippeophyllum halmaherense J.J.Sm. - Halmahera
5. Hippeophyllum hamadryas (Ridl.) Schltr. in K.M.Schumann & C.A.G.Lauterbach - New Guinea
6. Hippeophyllum micranthum Schltr. in K.M.Schumann & C.A.G.Lauterbach - New Guinea, Solomon Islands
7. Hippeophyllum papillosum Schltr. - New Guinea
8. Hippeophyllum scortechinii (Hook.f.) Schltr. - Borneo, Java, Malaysia, Sulawesi, Sumatra
9. Hippeophyllum sulense J.J.Sm. - Sula Islands in Maluku
10. Hippeophyllum wenzelii Ames - Leyte

== See also ==
- List of Orchidaceae genera
