= Risleya =

Scientific classification
- Kingdom: Plantae
- Clade: Tracheophytes
- Clade: Angiosperms
- Clade: Monocots
- Order: Asparagales
- Family: Orchidaceae
- Subfamily: Epidendroideae
- Tribe: Collabieae
- Genus: Risleya; King & Pantl.
- Species: R. atropurpurea

Binomial name
- Risleya atropurpurea King & Pantl.

Genus of orchids

Risleya is a monotypic genus of flowering plants from the orchid family, Orchidaceae. The sole species is Risleya atropurpurea. It is native to the Himalayas of Sichuan, Tibet, Yunnan, Bhutan, India, Sikkim, Assam and Myanmar. It was previously included in the subtribe Malaxidinae but is now placed in the tribe Collabieae.

== See also ==
- List of Orchidaceae genera
