= Meliniomyces =

Scientific classification
- Kingdom: Fungi
- Division: Ascomycota
- Class: Leotiomycetes
- Order: Helotiales
- Family: Hyaloscyphaceae
- Genus: Meliniomyces; Hambl. & Sigler

Genus of fungi

Meliniomyces is a genus of fungi belonging to the family Hyaloscyphaceae.

The species of this genus are found in Europe, Northern America and Australia.

Species:

- Meliniomyces bicolor
- Meliniomyces variabilis
- Meliniomyces vraolstadiae
