= Orestias (plant) =

Scientific classification
- Kingdom: Plantae
- Clade: Embryophytes
- Clade: Tracheophytes
- Clade: Angiosperms
- Clade: Monocots
- Order: Asparagales
- Family: Orchidaceae
- Subfamily: Epidendroideae
- Tribe: Malaxideae
- Subtribe: Malaxidinae
- Genus: Orestias; Ridl.

Genus of orchids

Orestias is a genus of orchids. It has 4 known species, all native to central Africa, including the island of São Tomé in the Gulf of Guinea.

- Orestias elegans Ridl. - São Tomé, Príncipe
- Orestias foliosa Summerh. in G.M.D.Troupin - Gabon, Zaire
- Orestias micrantha Summerh. - São Tomé, Cameroon, Equatorial Guinea
- Orestias stelidostachya (Rchb.f.) Summerh. - São Tomé
