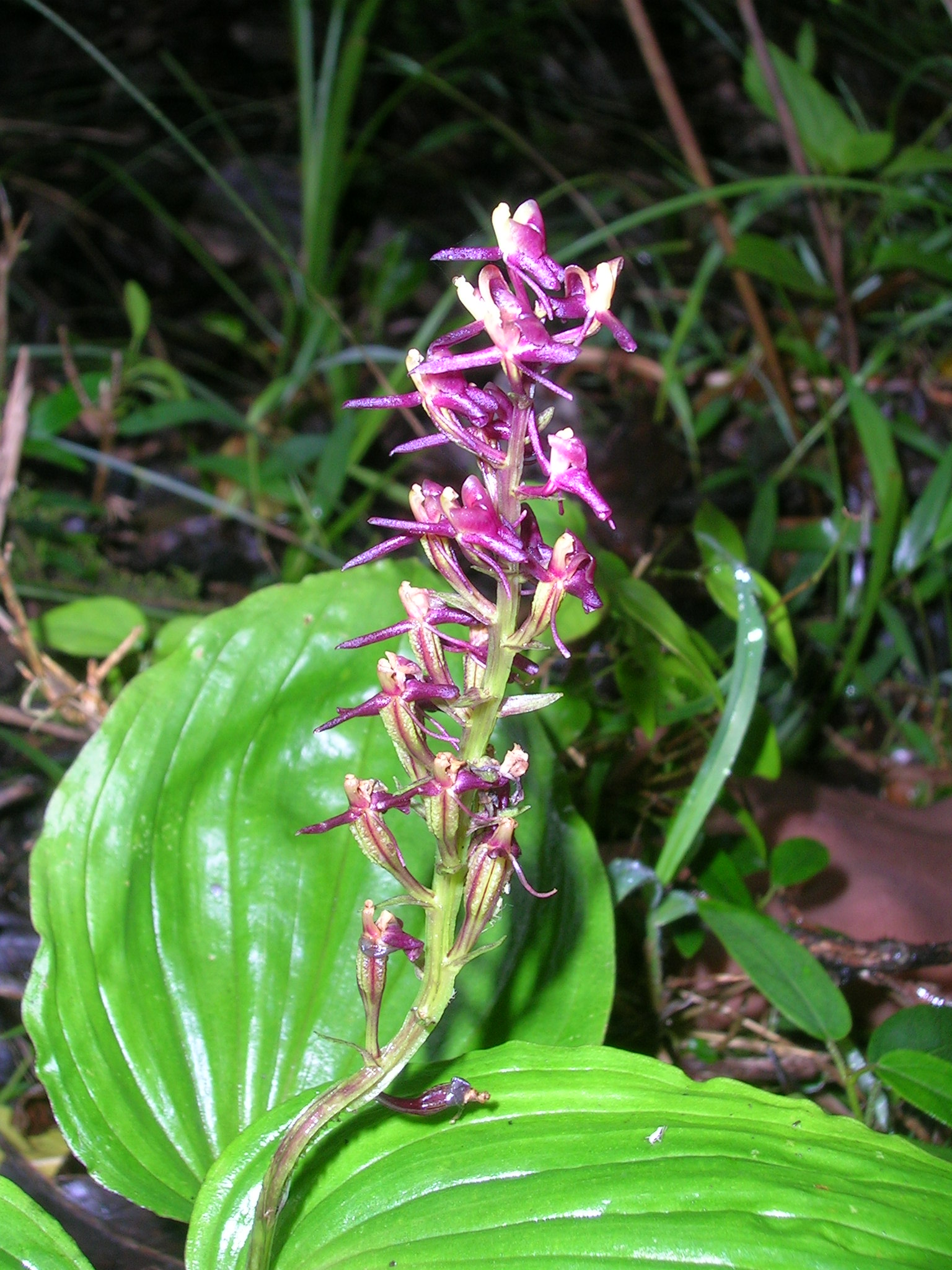
- Liparis sp.

Scientific classification
- Kingdom: Plantae
- Clade: Tracheophytes
- Clade: Angiosperms
- Clade: Monocots
- Order: Asparagales
- Family: Orchidaceae
- Subfamily: Epidendroideae
- Tribe: Malaxideae
- Subtribe: Malaxidinae; Benth. & Hook. f.

Genera
- See text

= Malaxidinae =

Subtribe of orchids

Malaxidinae is an subtribe of orchids in the tribe Malaxideae of the subfamily Epidendroideae.

== Genera ==
Included genera:

- Alatiliparis
- Crepidium
- Crossoglossa
- Crossoliparis
- Dienia
- Hammarbya
- Hippeophyllum
- Liparis
- Malaxis
- Oberonia
- Oberonioides
- Orestias
- Stichorkis
- Tamayorkis

Risleya was previously included, but is now placed in the tribe Collabieae.
