= Crossoglossa =

Scientific classification
- Kingdom: Plantae
- Clade: Tracheophytes
- Clade: Angiosperms
- Clade: Monocots
- Order: Asparagales
- Family: Orchidaceae
- Subfamily: Epidendroideae
- Subtribe: Malaxidinae
- Genus: Crossoglossa; Dressler & Dodson in C.H.Dodson

Genus of orchids

Crossoglossa is a genus of flowering plants from the orchid family, Orchidaceae. It contains 26 currently recognized species native to Central America and South America, from Nicaragua to Bolivia.

- Crossoglossa acuminatissima Nog.-Sav. & Carnevali - Colombia
- Crossoglossa aurantilineata Pupulin - Costa Rica
- Crossoglossa barfodii Dodson - Ecuador
- Crossoglossa bifida Dressler - Panama
- Crossoglossa blephariglottis (Schltr.) Dressler ex Dodson - Panama, Costa Rica
- Crossoglossa boylei Dodson - Ecuador
- Crossoglossa caulescens (Lindl.) Dodson - Ecuador
- Crossoglossa dalessandroi (Dodson) Dodson - Ecuador
- Crossoglossa dalstroemii (Dodson) Dodson - Ecuador
- Crossoglossa dodsonii R.Vásquez - Bolivia
- Crossoglossa elliptica Dressler - Panama
- Crossoglossa eustachys (Schltr.) Dressler ex Dodson - Panama, Costa Rica
- Crossoglossa exigua (Garay) Nog.-Sav. & G.A.Romero - Colombia
- Crossoglossa fratrum (Schltr.) Dressler ex Dodson - Panama, Costa Rica, Nicaragua
- Crossoglossa hirtzii Dodson - Ecuador
- Crossoglossa kalbreyeriana (Kraenzl.) P.Ortiz - Colombia
- Crossoglossa liparidoides (Finet) Dodson - Ecuador, Peru
- Crossoglossa longissima (Kraenzl.) P.Ortiz - Colombia
- Crossoglossa nanegalensis Dodson - Ecuador
- Crossoglossa neirynckiana Szlach. & Marg. - Ecuador
- Crossoglossa pichinchae (Schltr.) Dodson - Ecuador
- Crossoglossa polyblephara (Schltr.) Dodson - Colombia
- Crossoglossa sotoana Pupulin & Karremans - Costa Rica
- Crossoglossa steinii (Dodson) Dodson - Ecuador
- Crossoglossa tipuloides (Lindl.) Dodson - Colombia
- Crossoglossa topoensis (Mansf.) Dodson - Ecuador

== See also ==
- List of Orchidaceae genera
