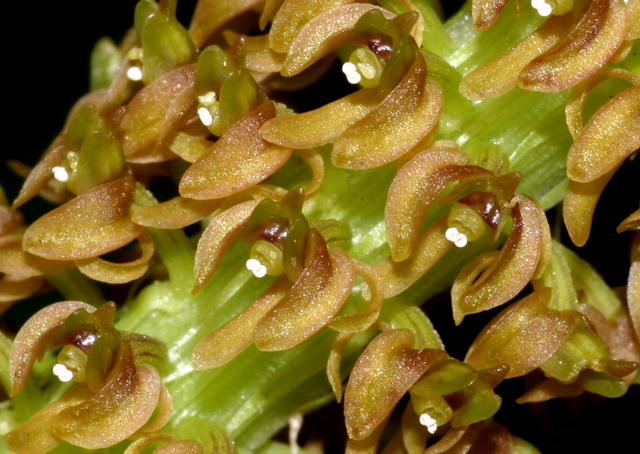
- Dienia ophridis, the common snout orchid

Scientific classification
- Kingdom: Plantae
- Clade: Tracheophytes
- Clade: Angiosperms
- Clade: Monocots
- Order: Asparagales
- Family: Orchidaceae
- Subfamily: Epidendroideae
- Tribe: Malaxideae
- Subtribe: Malaxidinae
- Genus: Dienia (J.Koenig) Seidenf.

= Dienia =

Snout orchids

Species of orchid

Dienia, commonly called snout orchids, is a genus of six species of orchids in the family Orchidaceae. Plants in this genus are evergreen, mostly terrestrial plants with a fleshy, above ground stem, large, pleated leaves and small, non-resupinate flowers with thin sepals and petals. The labellum is short and tongue-like. The genus is distributed in Southeast Asia, Australia, Micronesia and Melanesia.

== Description ==
Orchids in the genus Dienia are evergreen, sympodial, mostly terrestrial plants with fleshy, above-ground stems, although a few species are epiphytes. There are between three and six relatively large, thin, pleated leaves with their petioles wrapped around the stem. Small, non-resupinate flowers are borne along the end of the flowering stem. The flowers are green, brown, yellow, pink, or purple and have narrow sepals and petals. The sepals are oblong to egg-shaped and spread widely and the petals are usually narrower than the sepals. The labellum is relatively short with three lobes, the middle lobe tongue-like and the side lobes shorter and broad.

== Taxonomy and naming ==
The genus Dienia was first formally described in 1824 by John Lindley and the description was published in The Botanical Register. The name Dienia is derived from the Ancient Greek word dienos meaning "two years", referring to the stems which last for two years.

== List of species ==
The following is a list of species of Dienia recognised by the Plants of the World Online as at 1 June 2023:

- Dienia carinata Rchb.f.
- Dienia cylindrostachya Lindl.
- Dienia ophrydis (J.Koenig) Seidenf.
- Dienia shuicae (S.S.Ying) T.P.Lin
- Dienia truncicola (Schltr.) M.A.Clem. & D.L.Jones

== Distribution ==
Dienia are found in the Philippines, Sumatra, China, the Indian subcontinent, East Asia, Malesia, New Guinea and Australia.
