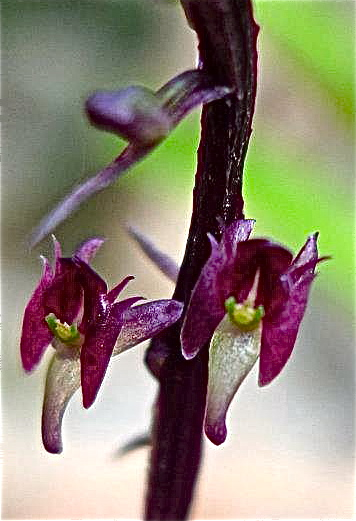
- Crepidium quadridentatum

Scientific classification
- Kingdom: Plantae
- Clade: Embryophytes
- Clade: Tracheophytes
- Clade: Angiosperms
- Clade: Monocots
- Order: Asparagales
- Family: Orchidaceae
- Subfamily: Epidendroideae
- Tribe: Malaxideae
- Subtribe: Malaxidinae
- Genus: Crepidium; Blume

Species
- See list of species

Synonyms
- Fingardia Szlach.; Glossochilopsis Szlach.; Pseudoliparis Finet; Pterochilus Hook. & Arn.; Saurolophorkis Marg. & Szlach.; Seidenfia Szlach.; Seidenforchis Marg.

= Crepidium =

Genus of orchids

Crepidium, commonly known as 沼兰属 (zhao lan shu) or spur orchids is a genus of about three hundred species of orchids in the family Orchidaceae. Plants in this genus are evergreen, mostly terrestrial plants with short stems lying on the ground, two or more relatively large, pleated leaves and small, non-resupinate flowers with spreading sepals and petals. The genus is widely distributed in the tropics.

== Description ==
Orchids in the genus Crepidium are evergreen, sympodial, mostly terrestrial plants with fleshy stems lying on the ground although a few species are epiphytes. There are two to many relatively large, pleated leaves with their petioles wrapped around the stem, the leaves sometimes lasting for up to three years. Small or tiny, non-resupinate flowers are borne along the end of the flowering stem. The flowers are green, yellow, red, brown or purple and have spreading sepals and petals. The dorsal sepal is usually longer than the lateral sepals and the petals usually shorter and narrower than the sepals. The labellum is erect, flat and usually undivided with two ear-like lobes near its base. The column is short and has two relatively large wings. No nectar is produced and there are two pairs of waxy, yellow pollinia.

== Taxonomy and naming ==
The genus Crepidium was first raised and formally described in 1825 by Carl Ludwig Blume and the description was published in his book Bijdragen tot de flora van Nederlandsch Indië. The name Crepidium is derived from the Latin word crepida meaning "boot", "sandal", "shoe" or "base", possibly referring to the shape of the labellum. Some authors previously included species in this genus in Malaxis but Crepidium have stems lying above ground, broad leaves and an undivided labellum with ear-like lobes.

=== Species ===
(See List of species)

== Distribution and habitat ==
Species of Crepidium are found in tropical countries including China, the Indian subcontinent, Southeast asia, northern Australia, New Guinea, and various islands of the Pacific and Indian Oceans. The greatest diversity is in New Guinea where about ninety species occur. Seventeen species, five of which are endemic occur in China. In Australia there are five endemic species in tropical Queensland and the Northern Territory. Many species grow on the floor of rainforest but some are epiphytes on mossy tree trunks.
