= Biological control of weeds in New Zealand =

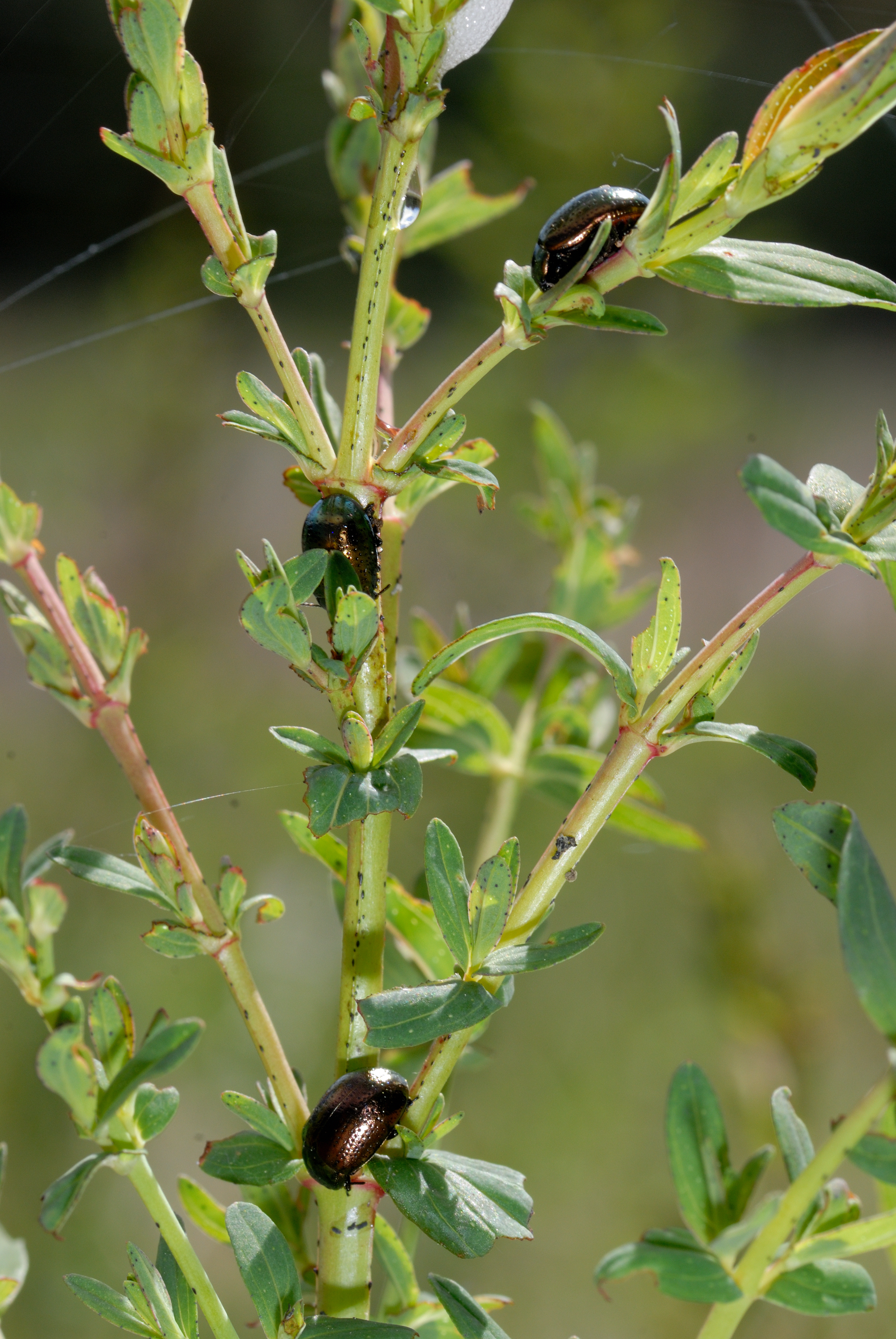
Adult Chrysolina beetles feeding on a St. Johns wort plant (Hypericum perforatum) in Balmoral, North Canterbury, New Zealand. This has been NZ's most successful weed biocontrol programme at controlling its target weed.

New Zealand is regarded as one of the weediest countries in the world and classical biological control (biocontrol) has long been used as one method to combat New Zealand's most widespread and damaging weeds. Classical weed biocontrol is where an agent specialised to feed on a weed species, typically a species of herbivorous insect or plant pathogen, is introduced into a country or region in an attempt partially or fully control the weed population. New Zealand is recognised as one of the five countries/regions of the world that has been most active in weed biological control (the others being Australia, Hawaii, North America, and South Africa). Since weed biocontrol began in NZ in the 1920s, 69 biocontrol agent species have been released against 28 weed species. Recently New Zealand has been releasing biocontrol agents faster than any other country, which has been partially attributed to the magnitude of the country's weed problem and its broad public support for weed control.

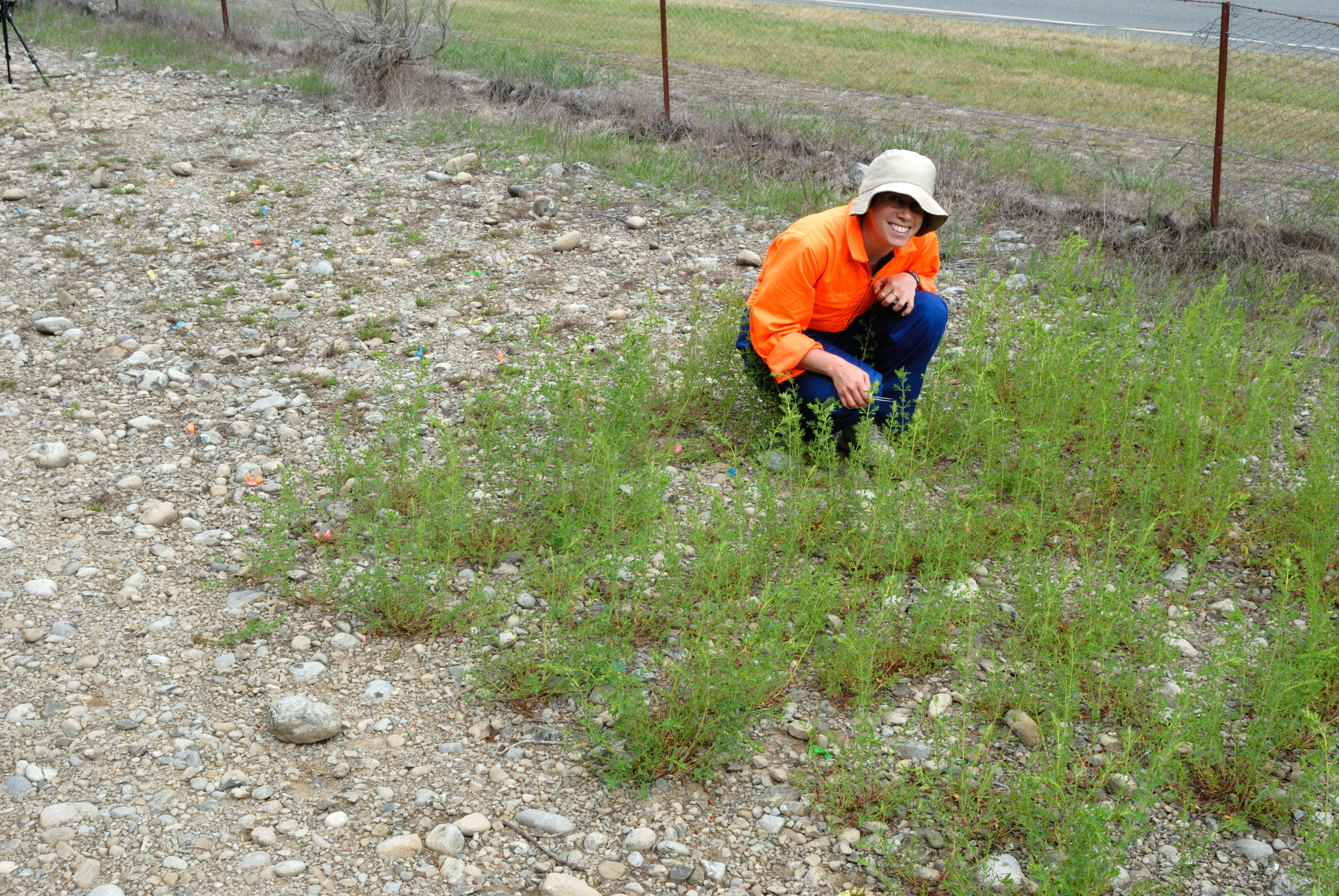
An example of the ongoing effectiveness of Chrysolina at suppressing St. Johns Wort in NZ. Weed biocontrol entomologist Ronny Groenteman in North Canterbury in 2010, at a plot of roadside gravel that had been sprayed with insecticide while the plot to the left had been sprayed with water. The water sprayed plot remains largely bare while the insecticide sprayed plot was a mass of wild St. Johns Wort.

Good weed control in New Zealand has been achieved using biocontrol for mist flower (Ageratina riparia), St John's wort (Hypericum perforatum), and ragwort (Jacobaea vulgaris) (the latter most successfully controlled on NZ's drier east coast). Partial control has been achieved for Mexican devil weed (Ageratina adenophora), alligator weed (Alternanthera philoxeroides), heather (Calluna vulgaris), nodding thistle (Carduus nutans), and Scotch broom (Cytisus scoparius). Other weeds, notably gorse (Ulex europaeus), have remained widespread and abundant despite several introductions of biological control agents.

Economic assessments suggest that weed biocontrol in New Zealand overall has been strongly cost beneficial. For example, the 2022 investment in weed biocontrol for production landscapes was NZ$0.69 million and yielded an estimated annual benefit of NZ$85 million. The calculated economic savings to New Zealand from the successful biocontrol of St John's wort, by itself, is greater than the country's total investment in all weed biocontrol programmes. St John's wort used to be one of NZ's worst pasture weeds until being successfully biocontrolled by two now widespread introduced beetles (Chrysolina hyperici and Chrysolina quadrigemina) with assistance in the upper South Island from an introduced gall-forming fly (Zeuxidiplosis giardi).

It is too early to judge the success of some programmes as it can takes years to decades for agents to reach densities that have significant impact on weed populations. A notable example of a delay that can sometimes occur in agent success has been the biocontrol of heather (Calluna vulgaris) using the heather beetle (Lochmaea suturalis). Heather had spread widely on the central volcanic plateau in the North Island. The Department of Conservation initiated a heather biocontrol programme that led to L. suturalis being released at Tongariro National Park in 1990. It was over a decade later, in 2001, that heather beetle outbreaks began killing patches of heather. By 2007, the heather beetle outbreak was spreading quickly and it was demonstrated that heather beetles were more effective at killing heather than herbicide use, and led to an increase in cover of native dicot plants while these decreased in cover and species richness with herbicide application.

With so many weeds wild in New Zealand, there had been the concern that biologically controlling one weed species on conservation land would only lead to replacement by another weed instead of benefiting the native flora. This was shown not to be the case with the successful biocontrol of mist flower, which had become a dense and widespread forest riparian weed in northern New Zealand, and then was successfully biologically controlled by the release of a white smut fungus (Entyloma ageratinae) and a gall fly (Procecidochares alani). Over five years of monitoring, the species richness and percentage cover of other introduced plants was unaltered while the species richness and percentage cover of native plants increased.

== History ==
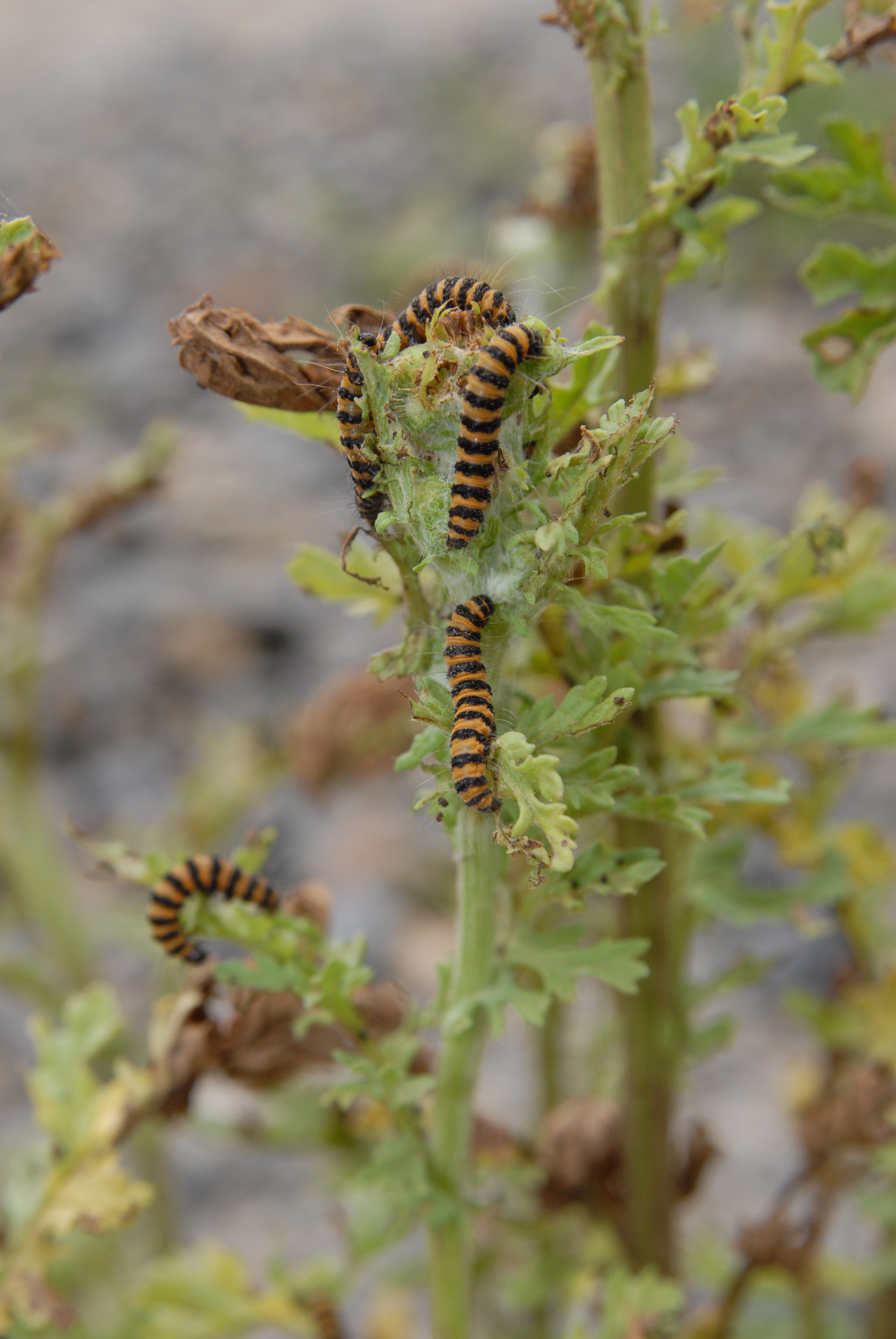
A ragwort plant in Auckland, New Zealand, being fed on by caterpillars of cinnabar moth. Cinnabar moth was one of the first biocontrol agents released in NZ.

Weed biocontrol research has been done by successive generations of New Zealand scientists, beginning in 1925 at the Cawthron Institute in Nelson. The first weeds targeted were blackberry (Rubus fruticosus agg.), foxglove (Digitalis purpurea), gorse (Ulex europaeus), ragwort (Jacobaea vulgaris), and one endemic native NZ plant, piripiri (Acaena anserinifolia). Of the 17 insects imported for study, three were released and of these two established (the ragwort cinnabar moth (Tyria jacobaeae and the gorse seed weevil (Exapion ulicis),) while the Chilean piripiri sawfly (Ucona acaenae) failed.

In the 1940s through to the 1980s, New Zealand weed biocontrol work was led by the Department of Scientific and Industrial Research, followed by the Crown Research Institutes from 1992. There was a wane in biocontrol investment between 1931 and 1965 due to a focus on new-generation herbicides, followed by a resurgence in interest in weed biocontrol following increased awareness of herbicides' non-target impacts and issues with resistance. To date, the decades with the most weed biocontrol introductions into New Zealand have been the 1990s and 2000s (with 15 and 13 agents introduced, respectively).

Weed biocontrol programmes in NZ have typically been initiated by, and often partially funded by, primary production industries or agencies responsible for environmental management like regional councils and the Department of Conservation.

== Agents used ==
Biocontrol agents released to control weeds in New Zealand, ordered by date of release.
Biocontrol agent	Weed species targeted	Date of first release	Established
Tyria jacobaeae	Jacobaea vulgaris	1929	Yes
Apion ulicis	Ulex europaeus	1931	Yes
Ucona aecena (as Antholcus varinervis)	Acaena anserinifolia	1936	No
Botanophila jacobaeae	Jacobaea vulgaris	1936	Yes
Botanophila seneciella	Jacobaea vulgaris	1936	No
Chrysolina hyperici	Hypericum perforatum	1943	Yes
Procecidochares utilis	Ageratina adenophora	1958	Yes
Zeuxidiplosis giardi	Hypericum perforatum	1961	Yes
Chrysolina quadrigemina	Hypericum perforatum	1963	Yes
Rhinocyllus conicus	Carduus nutans	1972	Yes
Urophora cardui	Cirsium arvense	1976	Yes
Ceutorhynchus litura	Cirsium arvense	1976	No
Altica carduorum	Cirsium arvense	1979	No
Agasicles hygrophila	Alternanthera philoxeroides	1981	Yes
Disonycha argentinensis	Alternanthera philoxeroides	1982	No
Lema cyanella	Cirsium arvense	1983	Yes
Longitarsus jacobaeae	Jacobaea vulgaris	1983	Yes
Arcola malloi	Alternanthera philoxeroides	1984	Yes
Trichosirocallus horridus	Carduus nutans	1984	Yes
Bruchidius villosus	Cytisus scoparius	1987	Yes
Tetranychus lintearius	Ulex europaeus	1989	Yes
Urophora solstitialis	Carduus nutans	1990	Yes
Agonopterix ulicetella	Ulex europaeus	1990	Yes
Sericothrips staphylinus	Ulex europaeus	1990	Yes
Cydia succedana	Ulex europaeus	1992	Yes
Arytainilla spartiophylla	Cytisus scoparius	1993	Yes
Scythris grandipennis	Ulex europaeus	1993	No
Phytomyza vitalbae	Clematis vitalba	1996	Yes
Phoma clematidina	Clematis vitalba	1996	Yes
Lochmaea suturalis	Calluna vulgaris	1996	Yes
Entyloma ageratinae	Ageratina riparia	1998	Yes
Monophadnus spinolae	Clematis vitalba	1998	No
Pempelia genistella	Ulex europaeus	1998	Yes
Urophora stylata	Cirsium vulgare	1999	Yes
Aulacidea subterminalis	Pilosella spp.	1999	Yes
Oxyptilus pilosellae	Pilosella spp.	1999	No
Procecidochares alani	Ageratina riparia	2000	Yes
Macrolabis pilosellae	Pilosella spp.	2000	Yes
Cheilosia urbana	Pilosella spp.	2002	Yes(?)
Cochylis atricapitana	Jacobaea vulgaris	2005	No(?)
Platyptilia isodactyla	Jacobaea vulgaris	2005	Yes
Cleopus japonicus	Buddleja davidii	2006	Yes
Cheilosia psilophthalma	Pilosella spp.	2006	No?
Tortrix s.l. sp. chrysanthemoides	Chrysanthemoides monilifera monilifera	2007	Yes
Gonioctena olivacea	Cytisus scoparius	2007	Yes
Agonopterix assimilella	Cytisus scoparius	2008	Yes
Aceria genistae	Cytisus scoparius	2008	Yes
Cassida rugibinosa	Cirsium spp., Carduus spp.	2008	Yes
Ceratapion onopordi	Cirsium spp., Carduus spp.	2009	No?
Gargaphia decoris	Solanum mauritianum	2010	Yes
Neolema ogloblini	Tradescantia fluminensis	2011	Yes
Lema basicostata	Tradescantia fluminensis	2012	Yes
Neolema abbreviata	Tradescantia fluminensis	2013	Yes
Limenitis glorifica	Lonicera japonica	2014	Yes
Berberidicola exaratus	Berberis darwinii	2015	Yes
Leptoypha hospita	Ligustrum	2015	Yes
Chrysolina abchasica	Hypericum androsaemum	2017	Too early
Lathronympha strigana	Hypericum androsaemum	2017	Too early
Grypus equiseti	Equisetum arvense	2017	Too early
Kordyana brasiliensis	Tradescantia fluminensis	2018	Yes
Monophadnus spinolae	Clematis vitalba	2018 (re-release)	Yes
Freudeita cf. cupripennis	Araujia hortorum	2019	Yes
Aceria vitalbae	Clematis vitalba	2021	Yes
Trichilogaster acaciaelongifoliae	Acacia longifolia	2022	Too early
Uromyces pencanus	Nassella neesiana	2024	Too early
Blaptea elguetai	Tropaeolum speciosum	2026	Too early
Hylobius transversovittatus Neogalerucella pusilla	Lythrum salicara	2026	Too early

New Zealand's Better Border Biosecurity (B3) maintains a searchable database of all biocontrol releases into New Zealand, including for weed control. iNaturalist NZ maintains a checklist of weed biocontrol agents and a project for public observations of weed biocontrol agents in the wild.

Active research is ongoing into agents for the biocontrol of the following weeds: Acacia longifolia, Araujia sericifera, Berberis darwinii, Cirsium arvense, Clematis vitalba, Cytisus scoparius, Equisetum arvense, Iris pseudacorus, Lonicera japonica, Marrubium vulgare, Nassella neesiana, Passiflora spp. (banana passionfruit), Solanum mauritianum, Tropaeolum speciosum, Ulex europaeus.

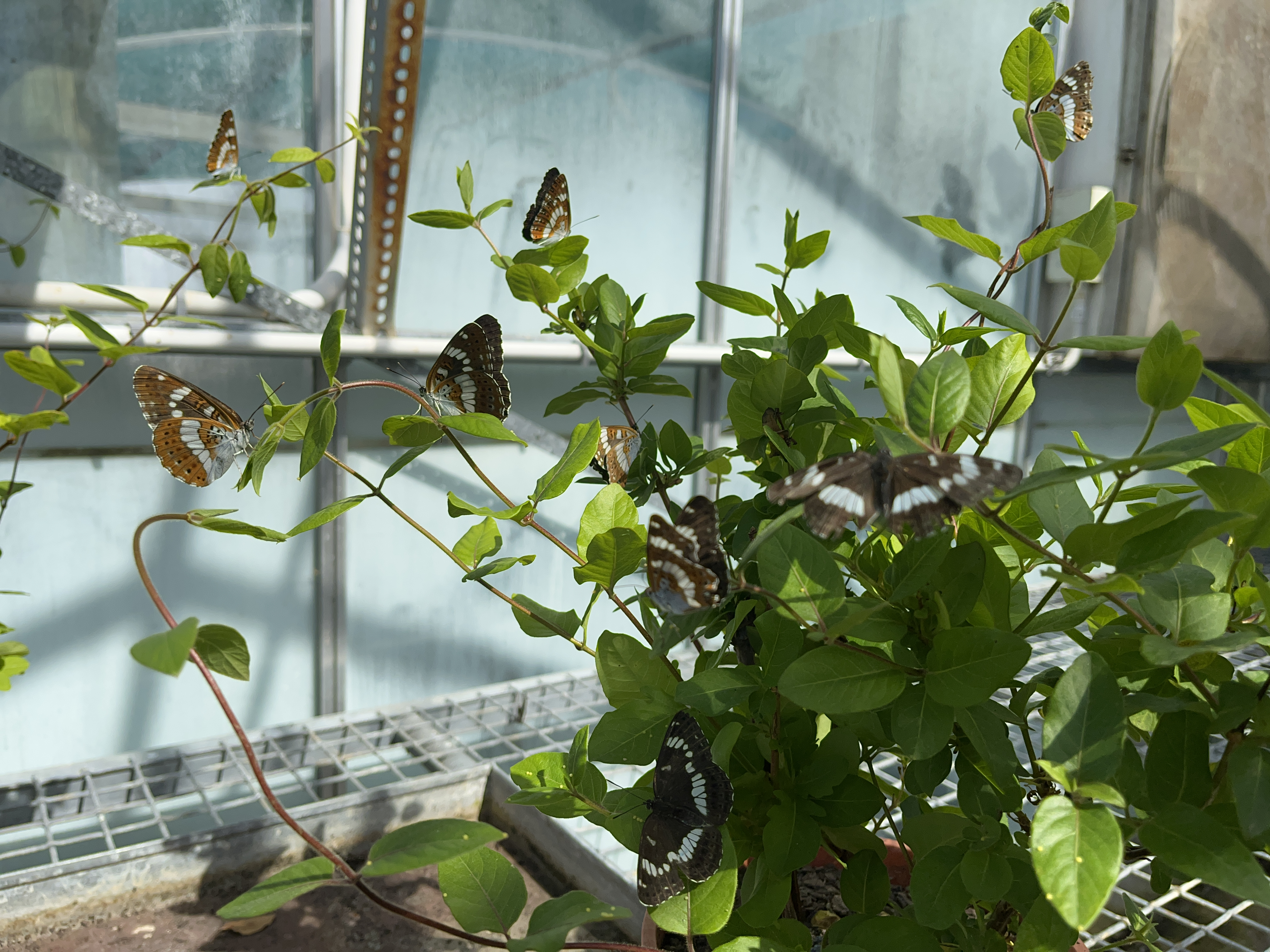
A group of Honshu White Admiral butterflies (Limenitis glorifica) on a potted plant of Japanese honeysuckle (Lonicera japonica) at the Manaaki Whenua–Landcare Research biocontrol agent rearing facility at Lincoln, NZ.

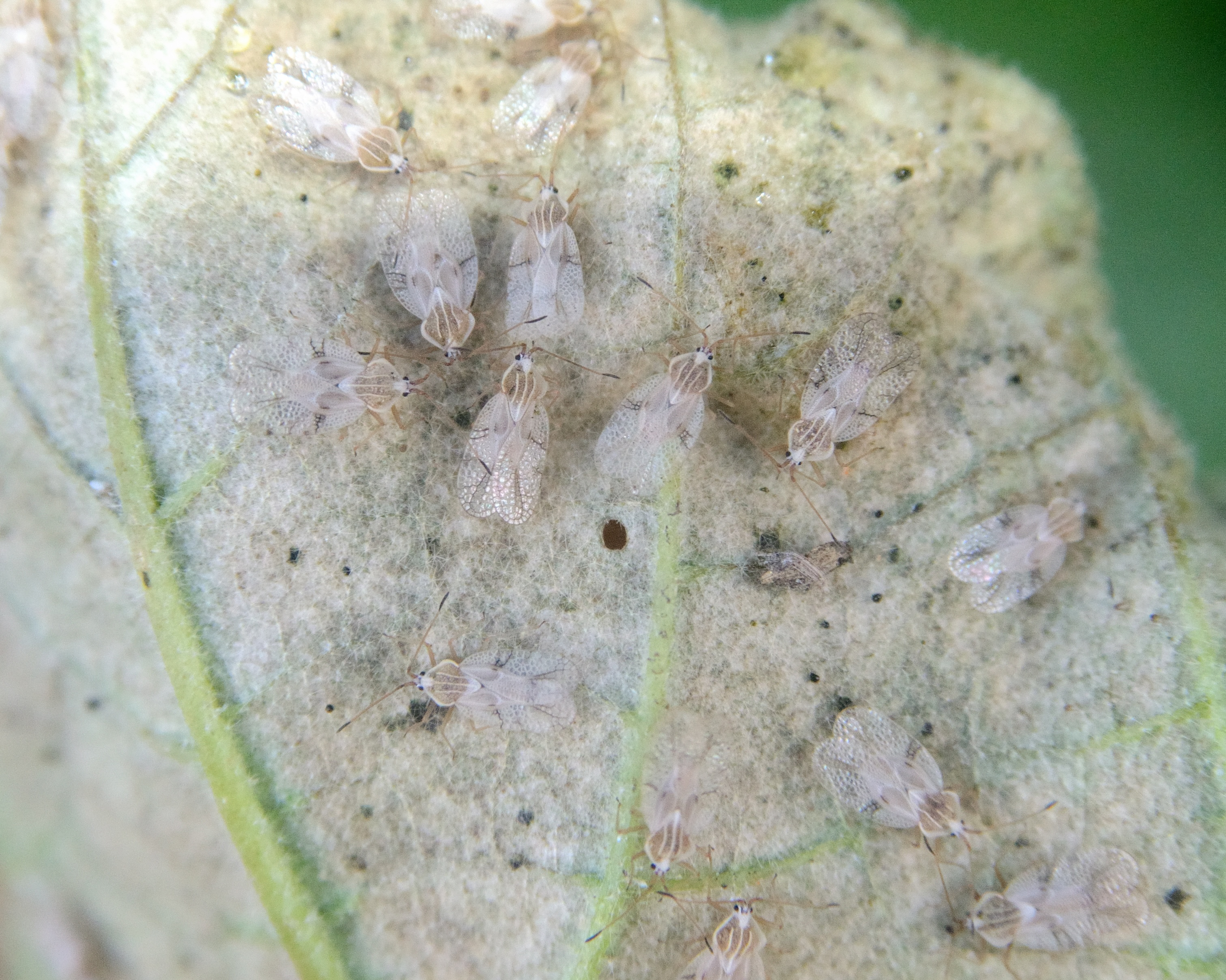
Woolly Nightshade Lace Bugs (Gargaphia decoris) feeding on a leaf of Woolly Nightshade (Solanum mauritianum) at Manaaki Whenua-Landcare Research biocontrol rearing facility at Tamaki, Auckland, New Zealand.

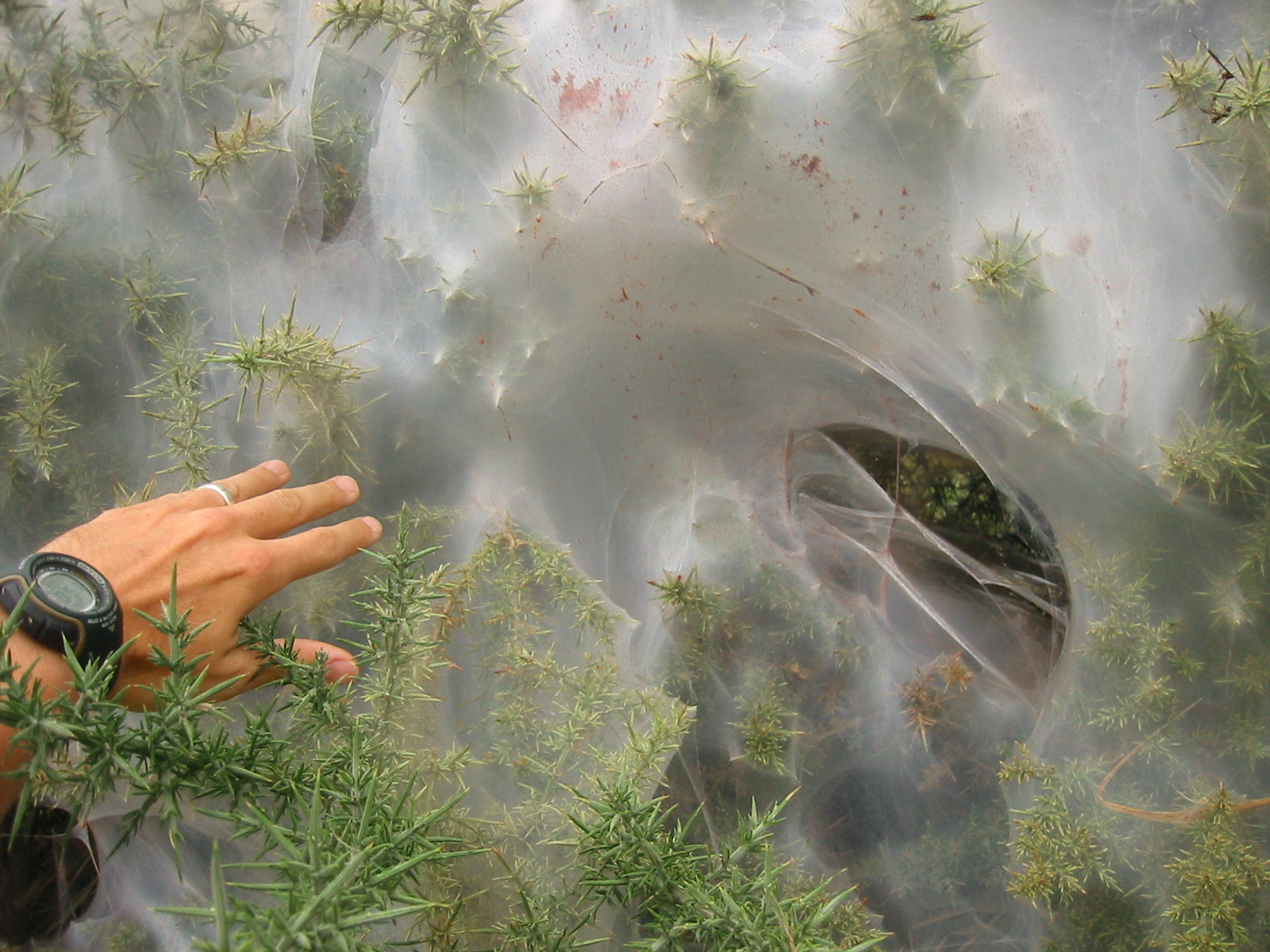
A large colony of gorse spider mites and web covering a gorse hedge, with a hand for scale.

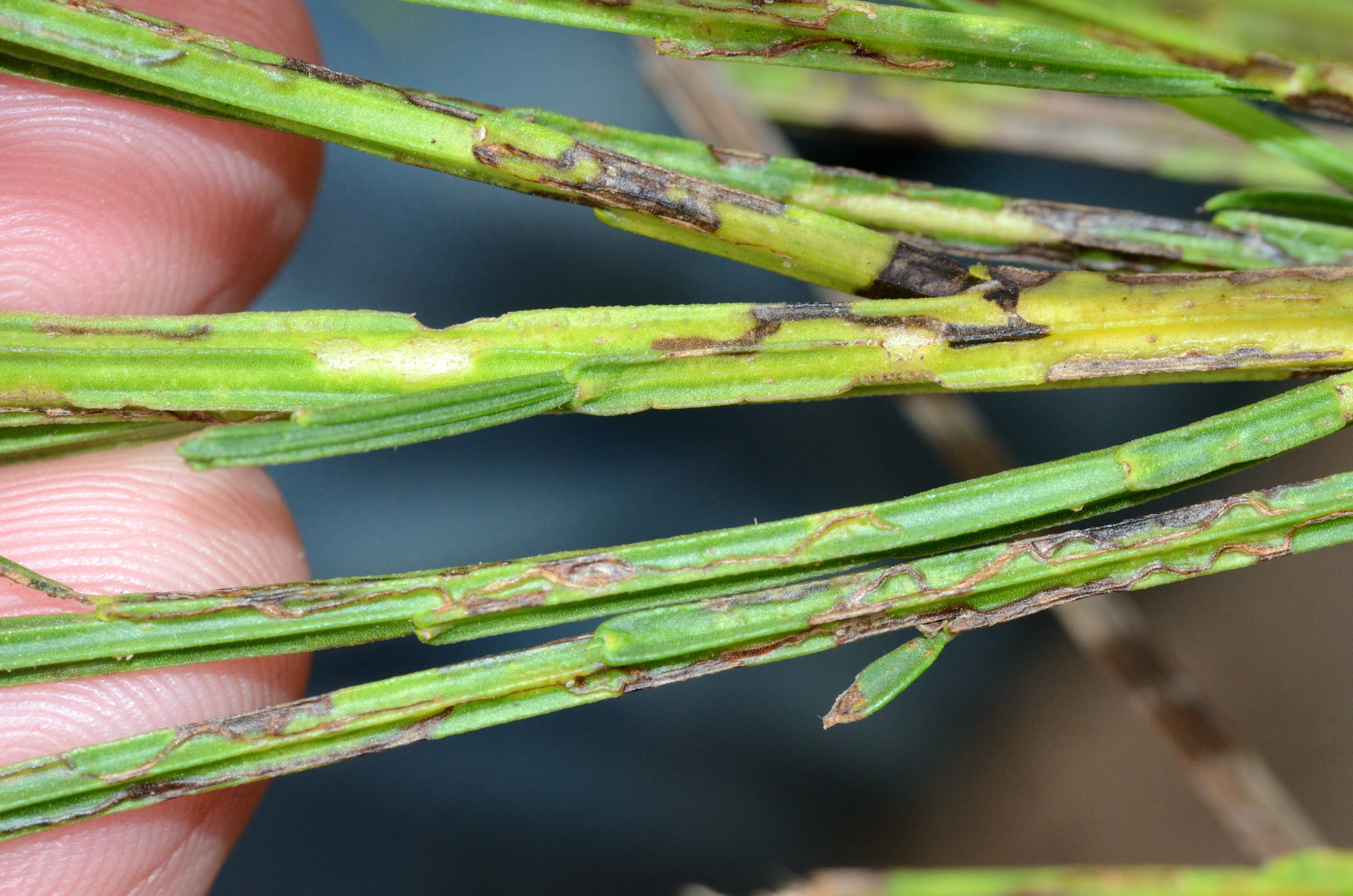
A photo of stems of Scotch broom with ample feeding damage by larvae of the broom twig miner (Leucoptera spartifoliell). This is an example of an effective weed biocontrol agent that as accidentally introduced into New Zealand.

== Safety ==
Weed biocontrol programmes need to identify potential agents, research their biology and impacts on their host plants, and then trial potential agents for potential non-target effects, before applying for permission to release into the wild. Over the decades this work been done under increasingly stringent safety checks and balances prior to agents being released. Weed biocontrol has been found to have a generally excellent safety record in New Zealand. Extensive surveys have found cases of minor damage to some native plants, and those were from early introductions and were predictable from retrospective host range testing. The New Zealand Environmental Protection Authority is now responsible for independently reviewing and approving agents before release, a process that includes public consultation.

Retrospective host range testing of the two Chrysolina beetles that successfully controlled St. Johns wort concluded that the more rigorous host range testing requirements of modern NZ weed biocontrol programmes would likely have prevented the introduction of these agents in NZ, due to feeding on related native Hypercium plants.

Not all of New Zealand's weed biocontrol agents were intentionally introduced. Some agents introduced into Australia have made their way across the Tasman to New Zealand. At least four weed biocontrol agents have reached New Zealand unintentionally: the broom twig miner (Leucoptera spartifoliella), hemlock moth (Agonopterix alstromeriana), blackberry rust (Phragmidium violaceum), and bridal creeper rust (Puccinia myrsiphylli). Broom twig miners, native to Europe, now cause extensive damage to Scotch broom in parts of New Zealand, but were accidentally introduced, presumably on imported ornamental broom plants, and first seen wild in New Zealand in 1950.

== See also ==
- Biological control of gorse in New Zealand
