= Biological control of gorse in New Zealand =

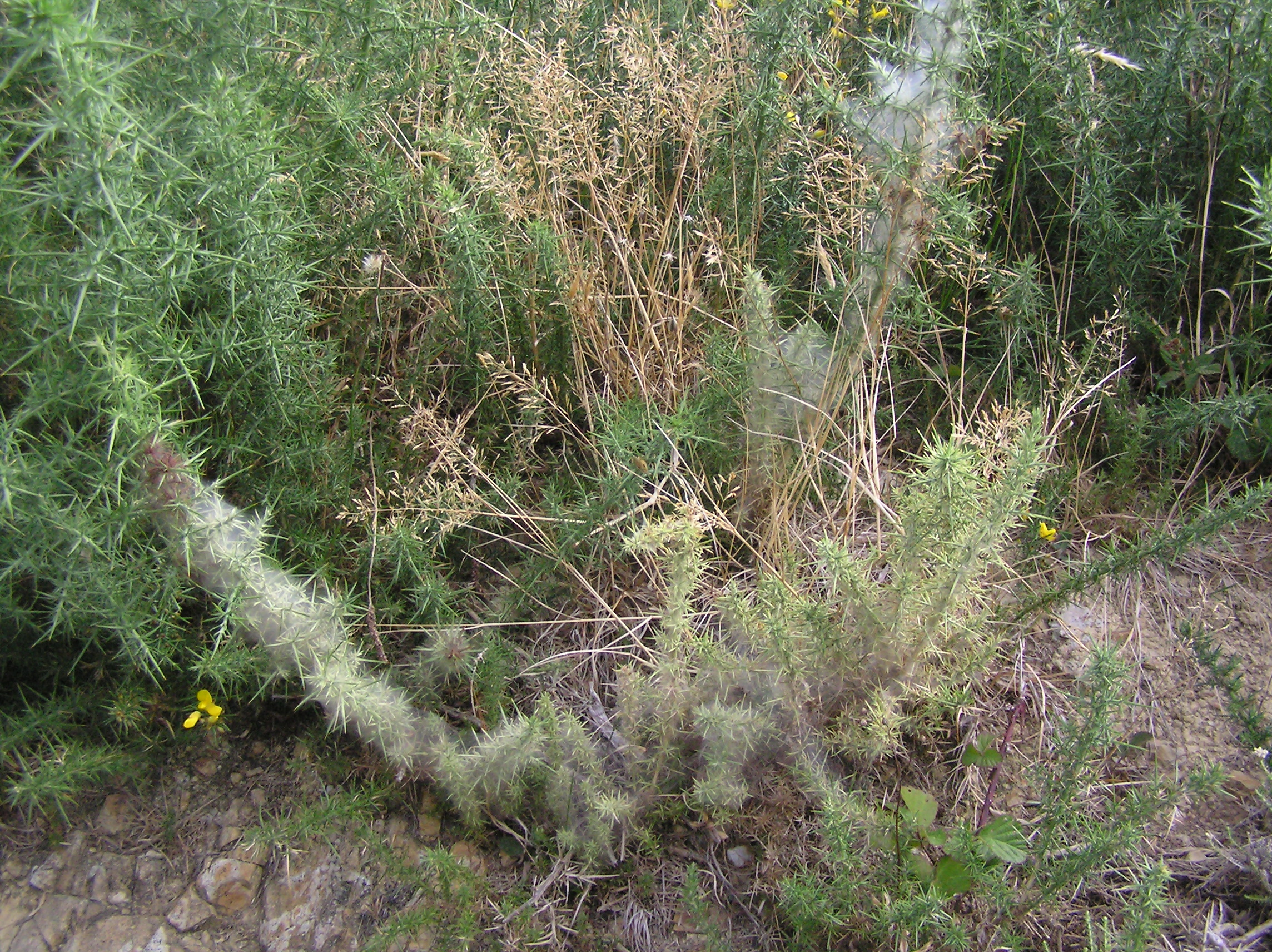
A T. lintearius web on gorse in Wellington

Biological control programs for gorse in New Zealand have existed since the introduction of the gorse seed weevil (Exapion ulicis) in 1928. Biological pest control is the use of natural mechanisms such as predation to limit the growth and prevalence of a pest. The early research into the biological control of common gorse in New Zealand was among the first of such programs worldwide.

== Background ==
Gorse was introduced to New Zealand by missionaries during the early stages of European colonization and quickly became a popular hedge plant, remaining in widespread use as fence material until the 1950s, when it was largely superseded by wire and posts. It is still a common fence material on the Canterbury Plains, where it was most popular. It established itself very quickly, and the lack of natural predators or other controls meant that it spread rapidly, flowering for longer periods and growing to a larger size than it did in Europe. Gorse is an extremely hardy plant which forms dense thickets over what was once native forest or productive farmland; any attempts to destroy it by burning or spraying often result in rapid, widespread regrowth. The seeds are produced in great numbers and can remain dormant in the soil for extended periods of time.

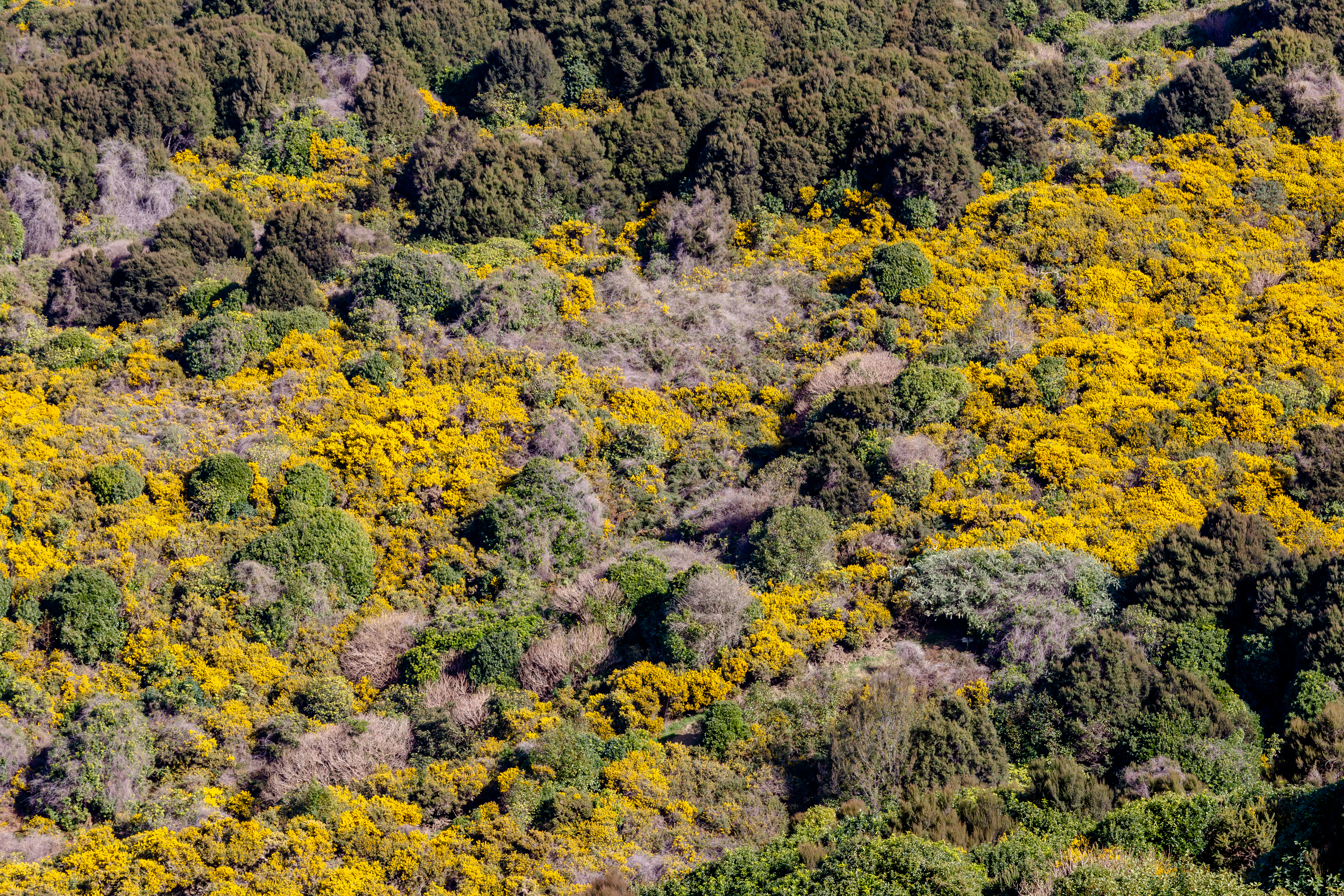
Gorse in Hinewai Reserve being overgrown by native trees

Although gorse was identified as a major weed in New Zealand in 1859 and declared a weed by Parliament as early as 1900, its agricultural uses meant that biological control was not considered as a means of controlling the invasive species until the 1920s. Even then, the search for possible agents was restricted to those which would control growth by damaging the reproductive system, and would not affect the foliage.

In the years that followed the research of the late 1920s, more objections to biological control were raised by environmentalists, including the concept that it is risky to introduce any new species to an already compromised ecosystem, even to destroy a previously introduced one. Further, it has been argued that gorse has uses beyond its colonial origins as a fence plant, for example as a source of food for bees in the early spring. Members of Environment Bay of Plenty have noted that gorse is a useful 'nursery' plant for native seedlings; it supplies the shelter and high nitrogen content in the soil that they need to mature, then, being less shade tolerant, gives way when a young native forest has been established. This approach has been applied successfully at Hinewai Reserve on Banks Peninsula, with succession through gorse taking a much shorter time than through the usual mānuka or kānuka. However, experts like ecologist Ian Popay argue that the forest that results is different to that which would have grown without the presence of gorse, and that this alteration is not "natural". Hawke's Bay Regional Council holds the view that cultivating native forest in this fashion is risky and cannot be recommended, although the Department of Conservation provides a practical guide to doing so.

== Biological control agents ==
Since 1928, seven agents have been released in New Zealand. Results have been mixed, but in general neither the seed-feeding nor foliage-feeding insects are doing enough damage to be viable as a stand-alone control agent.

=== Exapion ulicis (gorse seed weevil) ===
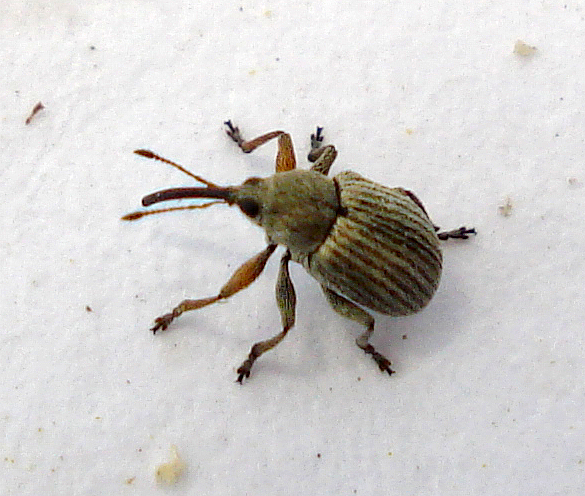
E. ulicis

While the adult weevil does visible damage to the foliage of the gorse plant by feeding on it, this is not significant enough to stunt growth in any measurable way; instead, this agent is effective because its larvae are hatched within the gorse seed pod and feed on the seeds, destroying them.

Research in the United Kingdom in 1928 suggested that Apion ulicis, as it was then known, would be an effective control agent; on the strength of these recommendations, it was imported into New Zealand that year. Widespread release of the weevil was carried out between 1931 and 1947. However, gorse in New Zealand is bivoltine, and the univoltine weevil was only effective during the spring. As a result, E. ulicis only reduced the annual seed crop by about 35%. Despite this, its apparent success — regular destruction of around 90% of the seeds produced in the spring — contributed to the delay in investigating further biological control agents until much later in the century.

=== Tetranychus lintearius (gorse spider mite) ===
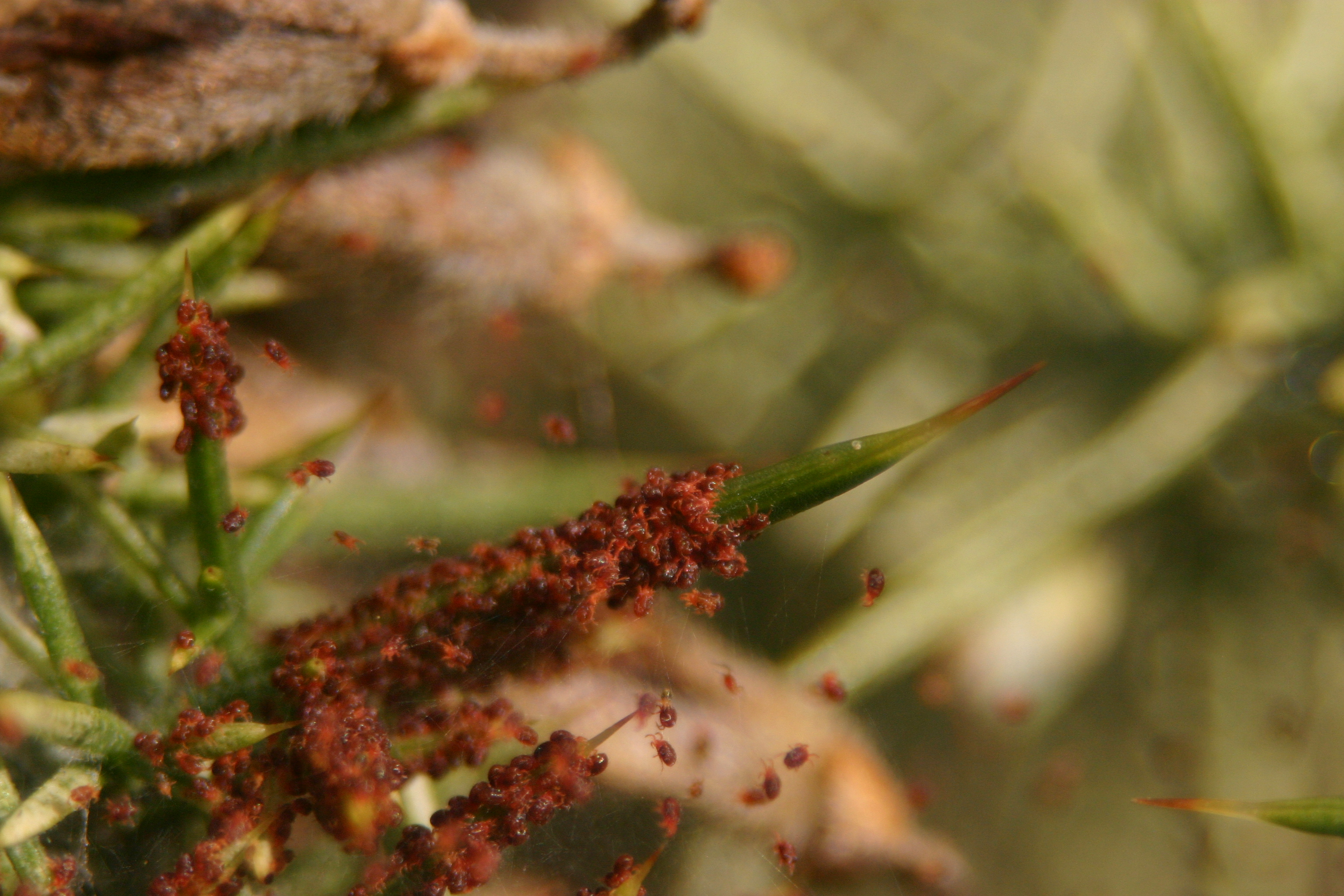
T. linteariuss on gorse in Wellington

Native to Europe, Tetranychus lintearius is a host-specific mite that lives in colonies under sheets of silk on gorse plants. It damages the plant by feeding on its tissues, and can reduce its growth and flowering activity dramatically. It is regarded as the most effective biological control agent for gorse in Europe.

A T. lintearius population from the United Kingdom was introduced to New Zealand in 1989, but did not do well in regions with higher precipitation and temperatures. Five new populations from Spain and Portugal which were selected to better match the climate in these regions proved to be more successful. The mite is now established throughout New Zealand, despite predation by Stethorus bifidus and Phytoseiulus persimilis, the latter of which was deliberately introduced to counter mite pests.

=== Sericothrips staphylinus (gorse thrips) ===
Introduced in 1990, the host-specific gorse thrips is widely established, but has not spread far beyond its release sites because winged individuals are relatively rare. It feeds on gorse foliage at all stages of its life cycle and can decrease growth by around 10-20%.

=== Agonopterix umbellana (gorse soft shoot moth) ===
A. umbellana larvae feed on young gorse. While first imported in 1983, it was not immediately released due to concerns it was not host-specific. Despite being released multiple times since 1990, establishment has been very limited.

=== Cydia succedana (gorse pod moth) ===
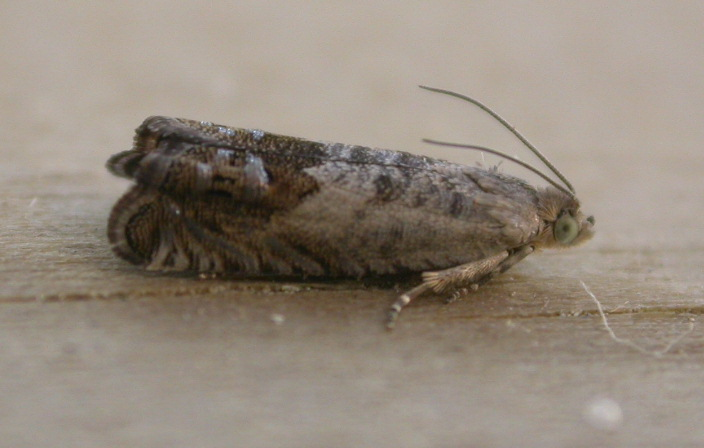
C. succedana

C. succedana larvae feed on gorse seeds. As it is bivoltine, it was selected for release in 1992 to complement the existing E. ulicis populations. It has now become established in New Zealand, and the two agents together can reduce the annual seed crop by up to 90%.

=== Scythris grandipennis ===
S. grandipennis is a moth whose larvae feed on mature gorse foliage in the winter. After significant difficulty in cultivating this species in the laboratory, it was released once in 1993 and has not established in New Zealand.

=== Pempelia genistella (gorse colonial hard shoot moth) ===
The larvae of the univoltine P. genistella likewise feed on gorse foliage. It has been released twice, three years after its introduction in 1995, but it is not yet known if it is established.

=== Grazing animals ===
While animals like sheep and cattle have not been deliberately introduced to curb the growth of gorse, controlled grazing can effectively limit its growth, whether in pastures or radiata pine forests. Goats have been used for control of gorse and other weeds since around 1927, and are able to eliminate large areas of gorse within four years.

== Future possibilities ==
Research has been done into using fungi like Fusarium tumidum as a potential mycoherbicide, as well as utilising indigenous species or other naturally damaging species like Ditylenchus dipsaci. Distribution of the two indigenous species known to damage gorse, Anisoplaca ptyoptera and Oemona hirta, is not recommended; they are not sufficiently host-specific, and may cause damage to other plants.

== See also ==
- Biological control of weeds in New Zealand
