= Maclellan island =

Island in Chattanooga, Tennessee

Maclellan Island
- Two hikers on Maclellan Island in winter

- Location within Tennessee Location within the United States

Geography
- Location: Chattanooga, Tennessee
- Coordinates: 35°3′22″N 85°18′2″W

Maclellan Island is an 24 acres (9.7 ha) island on the Tennessee River in Chattanooga, Tennessee. It is named after Robert J. Maclellan, who donated the island to the Chattanooga Audubon Society in 1954.

In 2023, the Chattanooga Audubon Society began the process of culling the invasive species populations, primarily honeysuckle, English ivy, and privet. When herbicide treatment and controlled burns failed, six goats were brought to the island to clear out plants by eating them.

Though one of the city's major bridges crosses it, the island is only accessible by boat.
