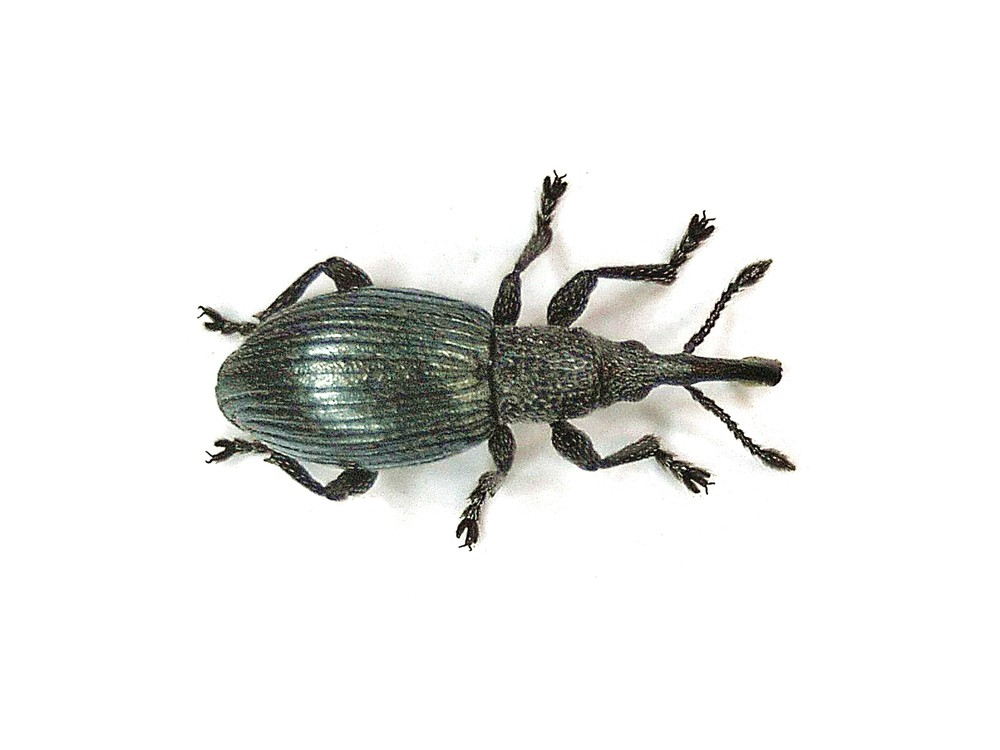

Scientific classification
- Domain: Eukaryota
- Kingdom: Animalia
- Phylum: Arthropoda
- Class: Insecta
- Order: Coleoptera
- Suborder: Polyphaga
- Infraorder: Cucujiformia
- Family: Brentidae
- Genus: Ceratapion
- Species: C. onopordi

Binomial name
- Ceratapion onopordi (W. Kirby, 1808)

Synonyms
- Apion onopordi W. Kirby, 1808; Ceratapion (Acanephodus) onopordi (W. Kirby, 1808)

= Ceratapion onopordi =

Species of beetle

Ceratapion onopordi is a species of beetle belonging to the family Brentidae.

It is native to Eurasia.
