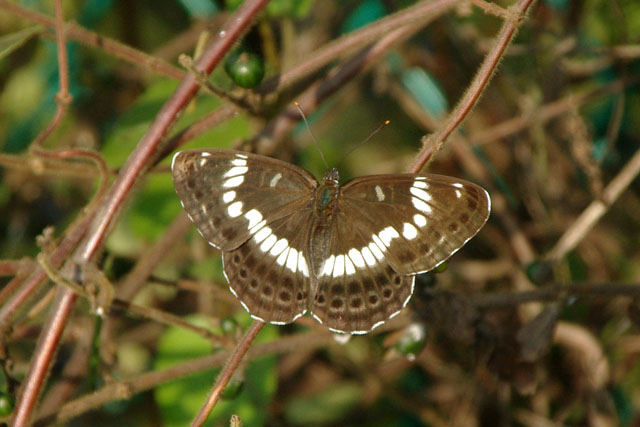

Scientific classification
- Kingdom: Animalia
- Phylum: Arthropoda
- Class: Insecta
- Order: Lepidoptera
- Family: Nymphalidae
- Genus: Limenitis
- Species: L. glorifica

Binomial name
- Limenitis glorifica Fruhstorfer, 1909

Synonyms
- Ladoga camilla glorifica (Fruhstorfer, 1909); Ladoga glorifica (Fruhstorfer, 1909)

= Limenitis glorifica =

Honshu white admiral

Species of butterfly

Limenitis glorifica, commonly known as the Honshu white admiral, is a butterfly in the family Nymphalidae. L. glorifica is endemic to the island of Honshu, Japan, where it is found in temperate open or shrubland habitats. L. glorifica was intentionally introduced into New Zealand as biological control for Japanese honeysuckle plants.

== Description ==
The eggs of the Honshu white admiral are pale yellow. First instar caterpillars are brown and do not have noticeable spine protrusions on their back; however, as they grow, they turn green and grow spiked protrusions. Caterpillars grow up to 25 mm long and pupate in a light green and brown pupal case.

The adult (imago) is black, with silvery-white stripes across the top of the wings, and reddish-brown colouring on the underside of the wings. At the end of the wings are grey, reddish-brown, black, and white markings. The wingspan of the species is approximately 60 mm. Males and females look alike. Limenitis glorifica belongs to the family Nymphalidae which has reduced front legs that lack claws and are often held against the body, and which are not used for walking.

== Geographic distribution and habitat ==
=== Natural global range ===
Limenitis glorifica is endemic to Honshu, the largest island of Japan.

=== New Zealand range ===
Limenitis glorifica was first brought into New Zealand in 2010, where it was approved for release in August 2013 and released into the Waikato region in 2014. Since being released, the butterfly has established in Karangahake in the Waikato and has been sighted in Tairua, Te Aroha, and Waihi Beach.

== Habitat ==
Limenitis glorifica prefers dry, warm climates. It can be found along hedges of suburban and rural areas, as well as in forest clearings, such as willows near riverbanks and field margins in open habitats. Limenitis glorifica has an altitudinal limit of 1450 meters but lays eggs almost exclusively on Japanese honeysuckle (Lonicera japonica).

== Life cycle ==
Limenitis glorifica lays eggs on the underside of Lonicera japonica leaves in spring, which is when larvae have the most successful maturation in warmer seasons. Eggs hatch after about a week and the larvae grows for around 28 days, with some caterpillars overwintering in shelters made from leaves if light levels decrease to less than 13-14 daylight hours per day. Larvae pupate in a case suspended from a honeysuckle plant. Adults emerge after a week and live for up to a month. Limenitis glorifica has an intricate courtship display where the male circles the females, which requires a large amounts of space. The development from egg to adult takes around eight weeks and up to four generations can be produced a year.

== Diet and foraging ==
Larvae of Limenitis glorifica primarily feed on Lonicera japonica but they can also feed on morrow honeysuckle and Leycesteria formosa, which is another invasive weed in New Zealand. However, other honeysuckles studied in Japan have shown little damage from feeding caterpillars. Each caterpillar consumes, on average, 2.13 g or 5.6 leaves. Adults only feed on Japanese honeysuckle.

== Predators, parasites, and diseases ==
These butterflies may come under attack from invasive social wasps that could limit their population growth. In New Zealand, however, few parasitoids are believed to attack the butterfly. Potential predators are invertebrates such as ants, praying mantids and wasps.

== Other information ==
Limenitis glorifica is endemic to the island of Honshu, Japan, but was released in New Zealand to act as a biocontrol for the invasive Lonicera japonica. The butterfly was successfully introduced in the Waikato region but failed to establish at other release sites, including a site in Auckland. In large numbers, caterpillars can defoliate plants.

Despite being a common species in Japan, the Honshu white admiral butterfly has had little research on it other than its distribution and plant preference as a larva.
