= Zeuxidiplosis giardi =

Scientific classification
- Kingdom: Animalia
- Phylum: Arthropoda
- Class: Insecta
- Order: Diptera
- Family: Cecidomyiidae
- Genus: Zeuxidiplosis
- Species: Z. giardi

Binomial name
- Zeuxidiplosis giardi (Kieffer, 1896)

Species of gall-forming fly

Zeuxidiplosis giardi is a European species of gall-forming midge which feeds on Hypericum plants. It has been introduced into some countries as a biological control agent for the pasture weed St. Johns wort (Hypericum perforatum).

Larvae of Z. giardi form galls on the growth tips and axillary buds of H. perforatum. Plants with a lot of Z. giardi galls can exhibit loss of vigour and reduced root and foliage growth.

Zeuxidiplosis giardi sourced from France were introduced into California in 1950 for St. John's wort biological control, and from there introduced to Australia, and from there introduced to New Zealand in 1960–61. Zeuxidiplosis giardi from Australia was released into South Africa in 1972, again for biocontrol of St. John's wort.

Zeuxidiplosis giardi has not been as impactful as Chrysolina beetles for St. John's wort control. In New Zealand it only established in the upper South Island, while in South Africa six local parasitoids have been reared from it which may reduce its effectiveness.
