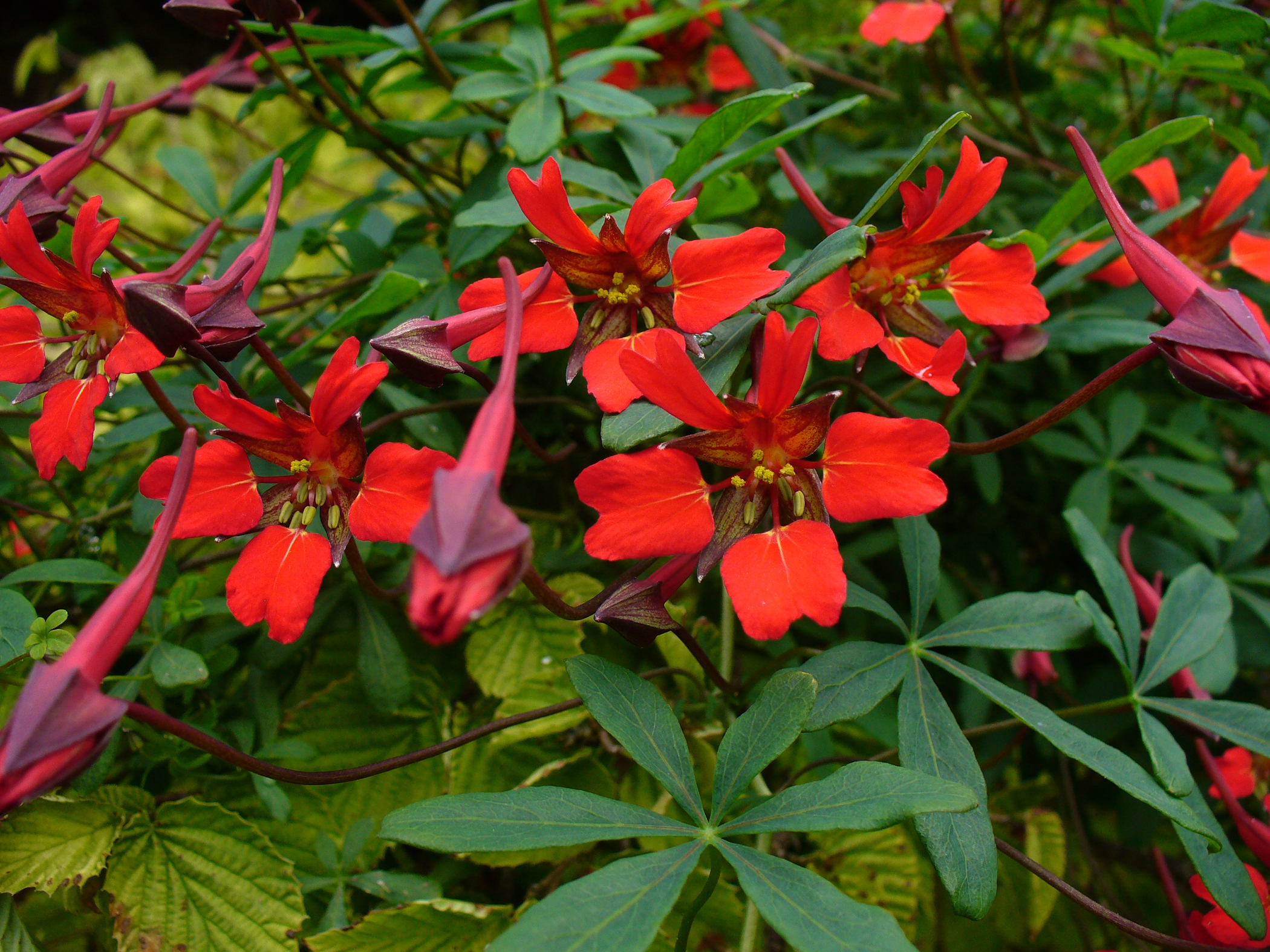
- In Devon (UK)

Scientific classification
- Kingdom: Plantae
- Clade: Embryophytes
- Clade: Tracheophytes
- Clade: Spermatophytes
- Clade: Angiosperms
- Clade: Eudicots
- Clade: Rosids
- Order: Brassicales
- Family: Tropaeolaceae
- Genus: Tropaeolum
- Species: T. speciosum

Binomial name
- Tropaeolum speciosum Poepp. & Endl.

= Tropaeolum speciosum =

Species of flowering plant

Tropaeolum speciosum, the flame flower or flame nasturtium, is a species of flowering plant in the family Tropaeolaceae native to Chile, where it is known locally as coralito, quintralito, or voqui.

== Description ==
It is a hardy herbaceous tuberous perennial with a wiry stem that grows up to 3 metres (9.8 ft) tall. It climbs through or over other plants to a sunlit position where it flowers profusely.

The leaves are palmately lobed with five to seven obovate leaflets. The scarlet, funnel-shaped flowers are spurred and grow on long stalks from the leaf axils. They have widely separated, clawed petals. After the flowers fade, the red calyces persist, curling back to reveal the three blue berries.

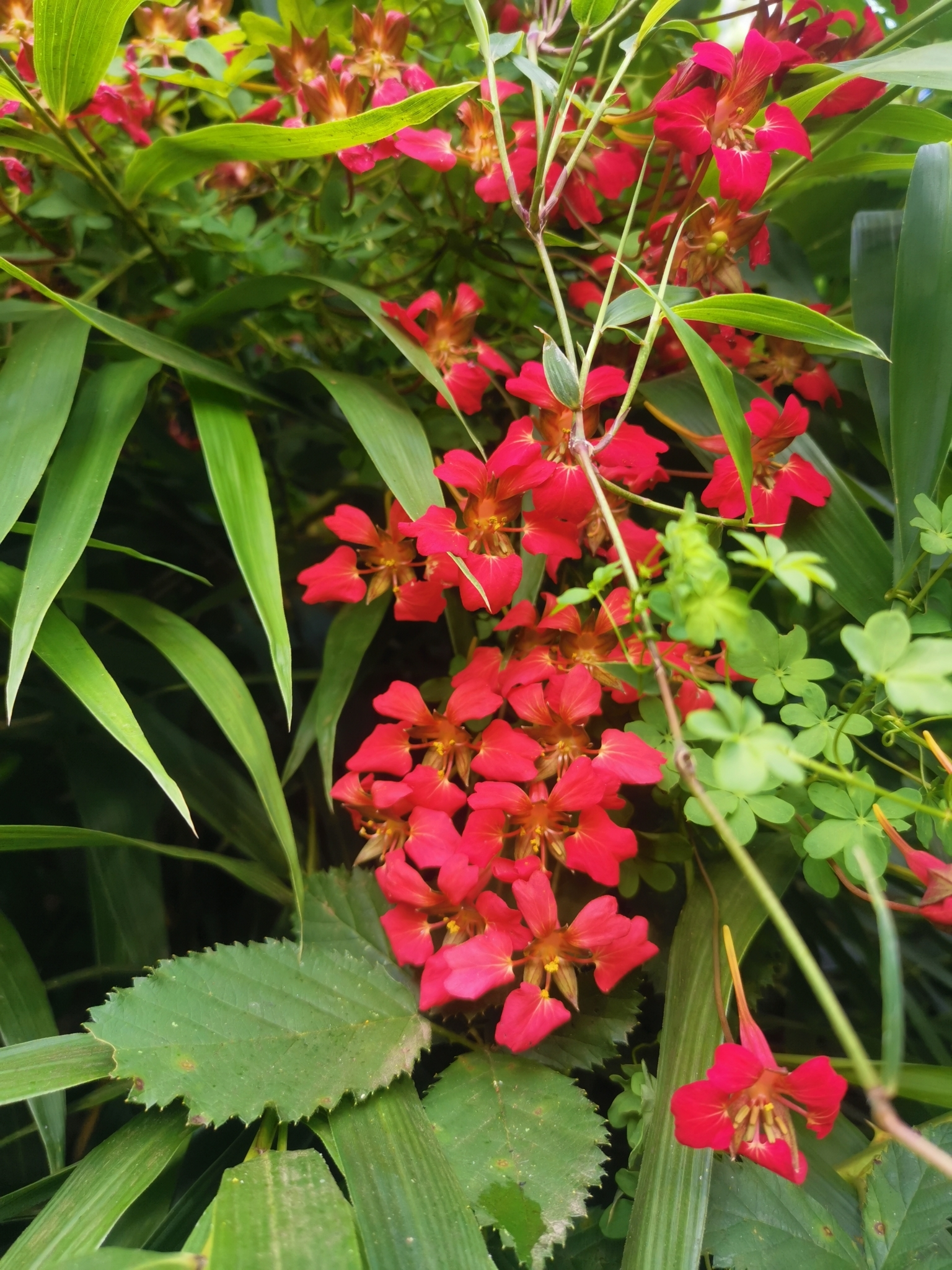
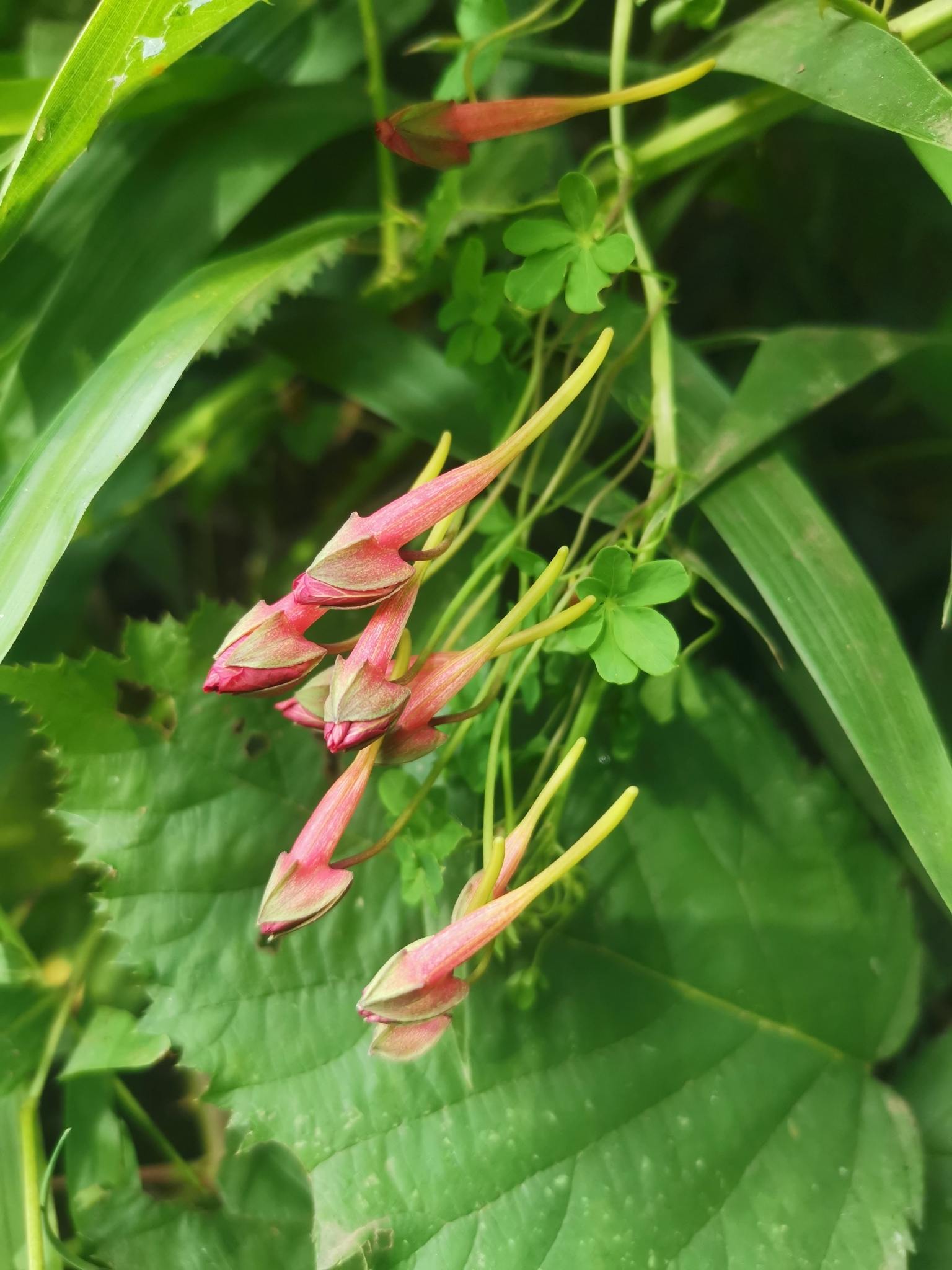
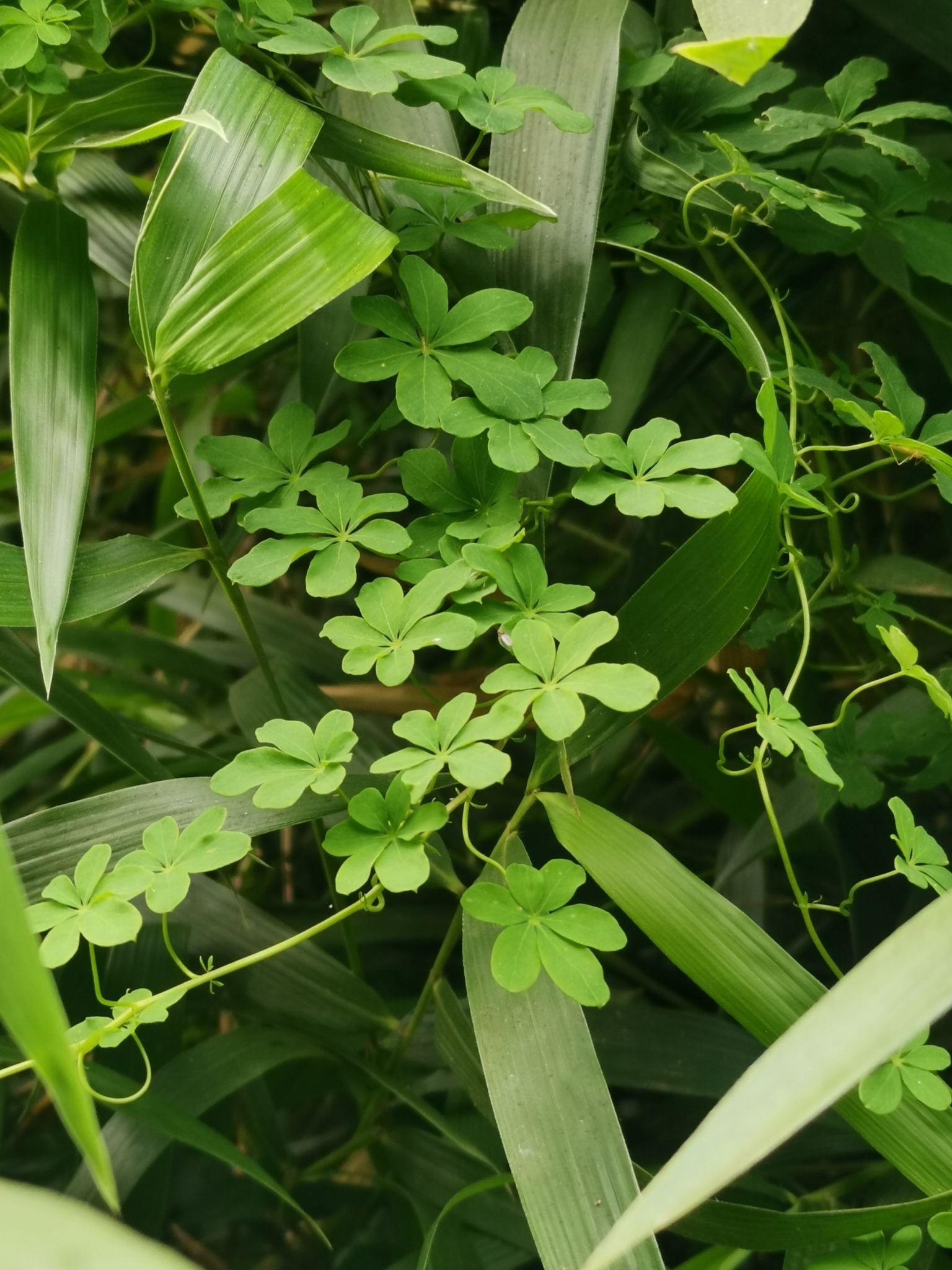
In Chile, its native range

== Cultivation ==
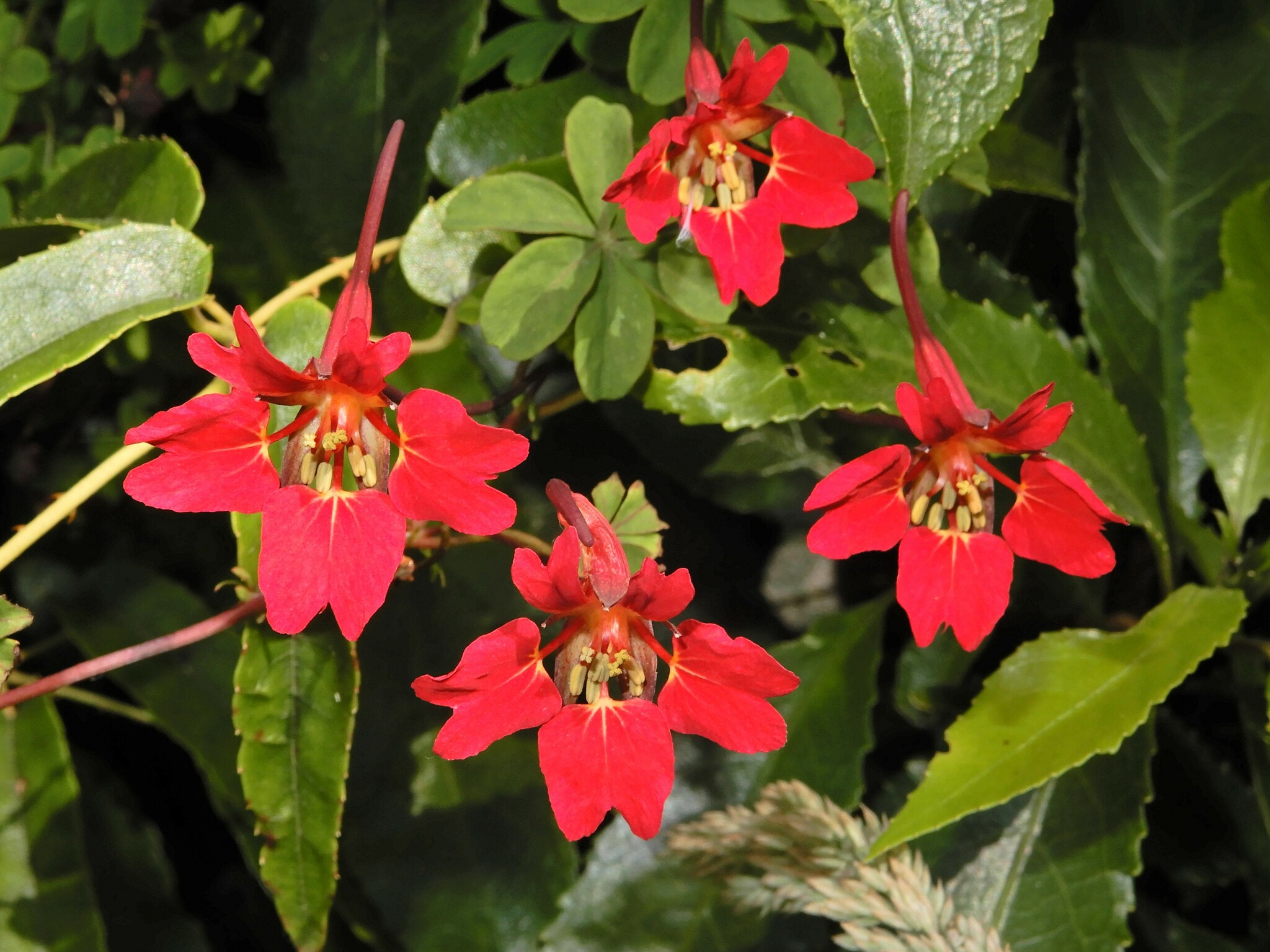
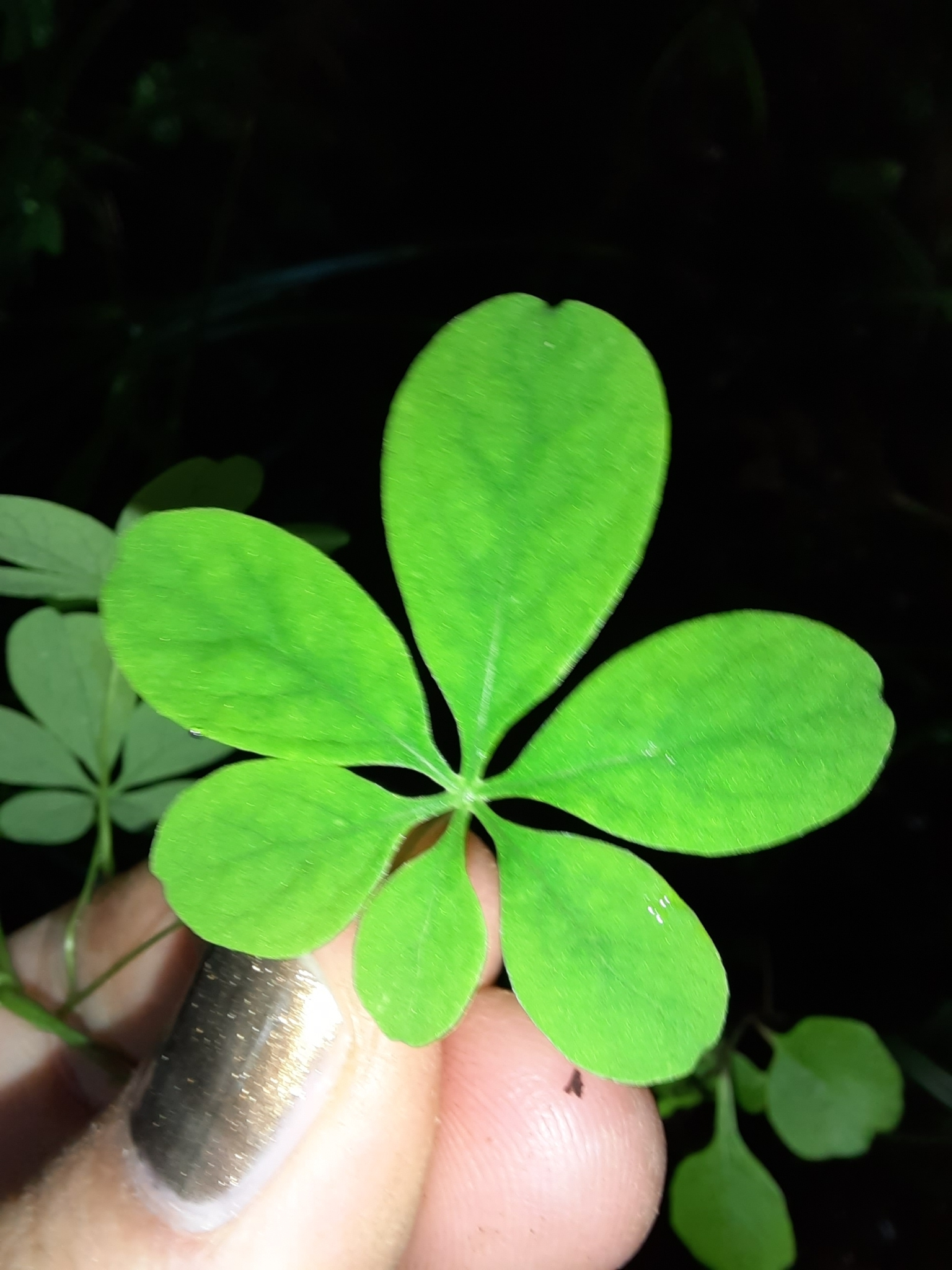
In New Zealand

The flame flower is not considered easy to grow. In some places it thrives and in others it fails completely. It does particularly well in New Zealand and Scotland. It has been called the "Scottish flame flower" and the "glory of the Highlands". It will grow in full sun or partial sun but likes a cool moist root run and is suited to acid or neutral soils. It can be propagated from seed or by division. The plant cannot tolerate lengthy periods of snow cover but is hardy down to a temperature of about −12 °C (10 °F). It is in USDA Hardiness Zone 8. It must be considered as such because during dormancy it generally retreats to a small underground tuber, where frost often does not penetrate.

This plant has gained the Royal Horticultural Society's Award of Garden Merit.

== Status ==
In 2020, T. speciosum was listed on the New Zealand National Pest Plant Accord. As such, it is illegal to breed, distribute, release or sell the plant within that country.
