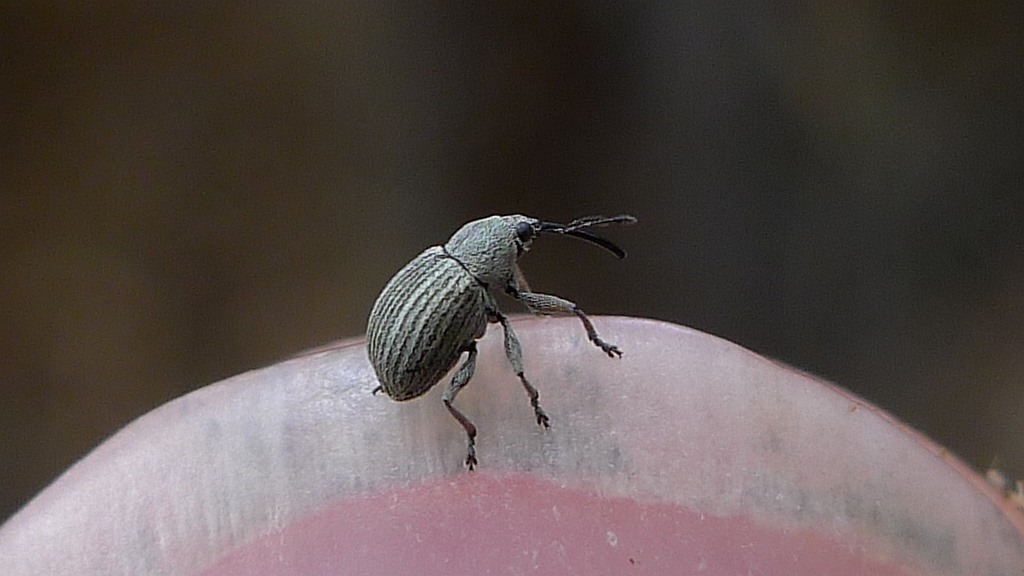

Scientific classification
- Domain: Eukaryota
- Kingdom: Animalia
- Phylum: Arthropoda
- Class: Insecta
- Order: Coleoptera
- Suborder: Polyphaga
- Infraorder: Cucujiformia
- Family: Brentidae
- Genus: Apion
- Species: A. ulicis

Binomial name
- Apion ulicis (Forster, 1771)

= Apion ulicis =

Species of beetle

Apion ulicis is a species of seed weevils native to Europe.
