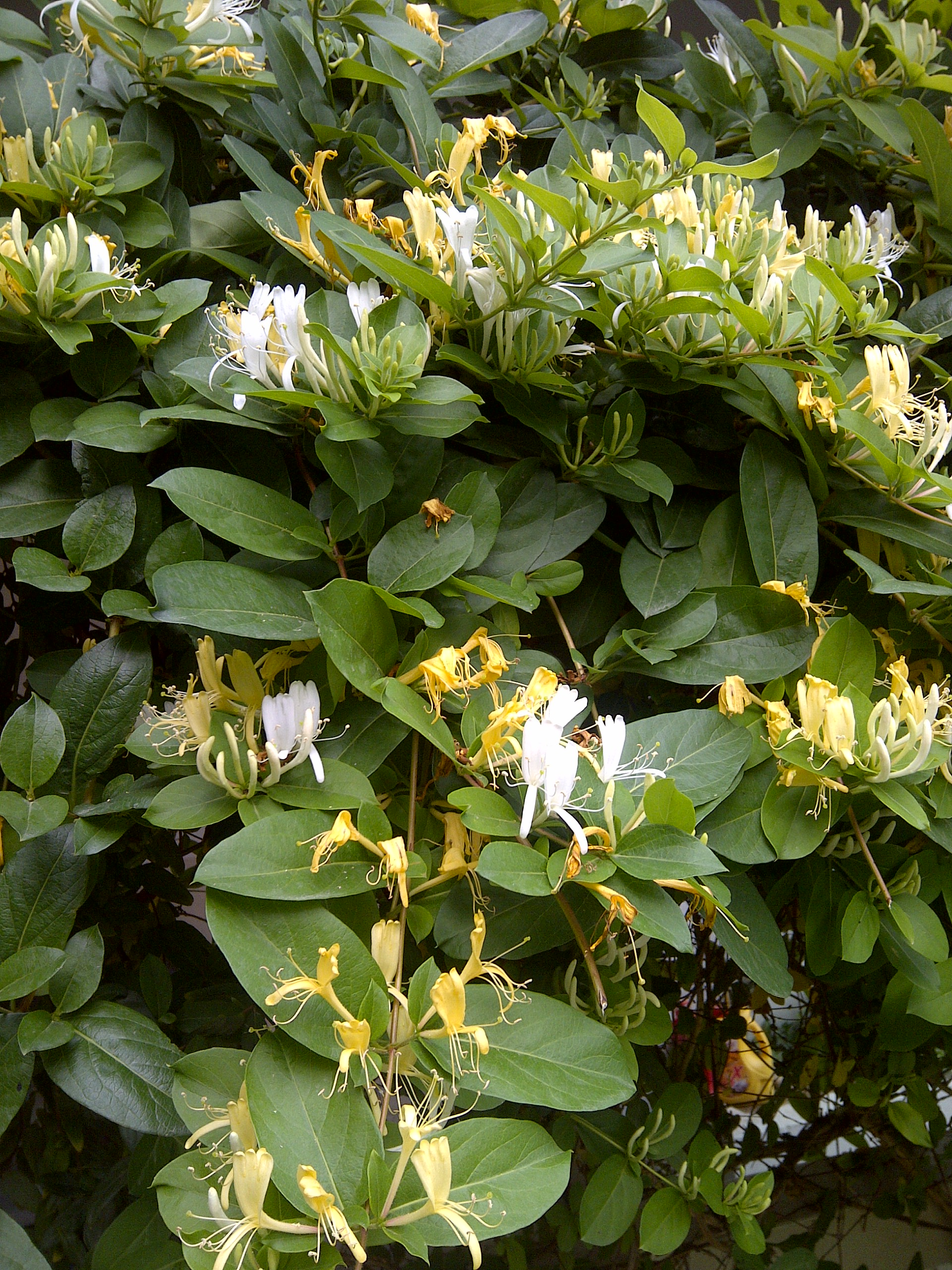

Scientific classification
- Kingdom: Plantae
- Clade: Tracheophytes
- Clade: Angiosperms
- Clade: Eudicots
- Clade: Asterids
- Order: Dipsacales
- Family: Caprifoliaceae
- Genus: Lonicera
- Species: L. japonica

Binomial name
- Lonicera japonica Thunb.

Synonyms
- Caprifolium chinense S.Watson ex Loudon; Caprifolium japonicum (Thunb.) Dum.Cours.; Caprifolium roseum Lam.; Lonicera brachypoda Siebold; Lonicera chinensis P. Watson; Lonicera fauriei H. Lév. & Vaniot; Lonicera shintenensis Hayata

= Lonicera japonica =

Flowering vine known as Japanese honeysuckle

Lonicera japonica, known as Japanese honeysuckle and golden-and-silver honeysuckle, is a species of honeysuckle native to East Asia, including many parts of China. It is often grown as an ornamental plant, but has become an invasive species in a number of countries. It is used in traditional Chinese medicine.

== Description ==
Lonicera japonica is a twining vine able to climb up to 10 m (33 ft) high or more in trees, with opposite, simple oval leaves 3–8 cm (1 1/4–3 1/4 in) long and 2–3 cm (3/4–1 1/4 in) broad. When its stems are young, they are slightly red in color and may be fuzzy. Older stems are brown with peeling bark, and are often hollow on the inside.

The flowers are double-tongued, opening white and fading to yellow, and sweetly vanilla scented. The fruit, which is produced in fall, is a black spherical berry 3–4 mm (1/8–3/16 in) diameter containing a few seeds.

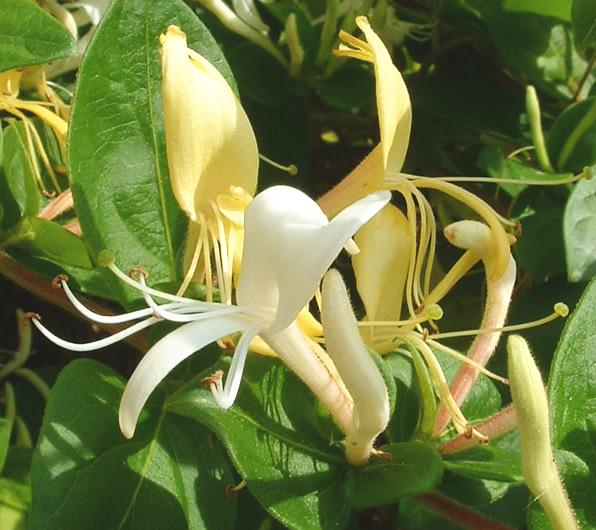
Flower

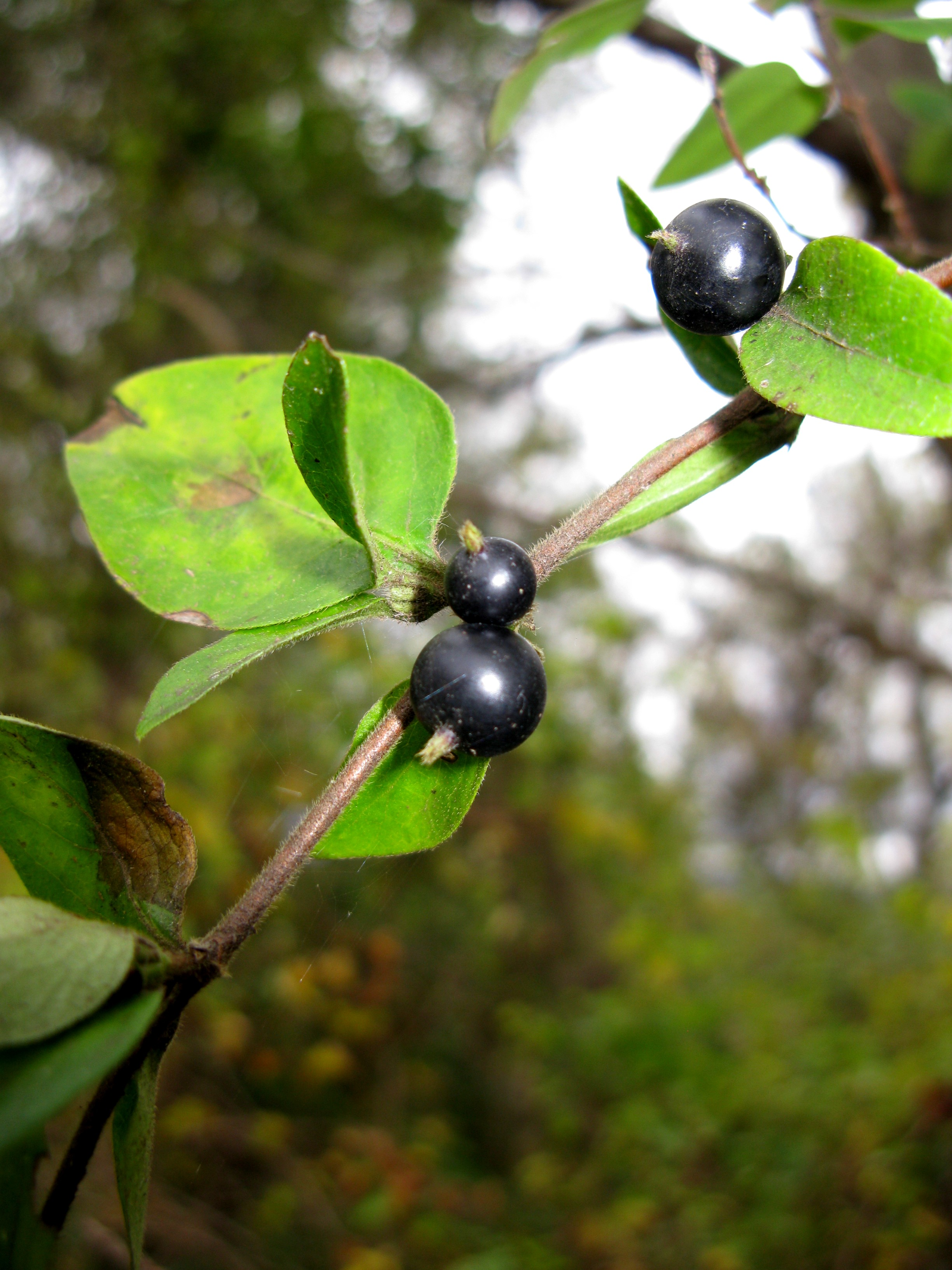
Fruit

=== Chemistry ===
Lonicera japonica leaves contain methyl caffeate, 3,4-di-O-caffeoylquinic acid, methyl 3,4-di-O-caffeoylquinic acid, protocatechuic acid, methyl chlorogenic acid, and luteolin. Other polyphenols present in the plant are hyperoside and caffeic acid. The two secoiridoid glycosides, loniceracetalides A and B, can be isolated, together with 10 known iridoid glycosides, from the flower buds.

== Subspecies ==
There are three subspecies of Lonicera japonica:

Image	Subspecies	Description	Distribution
	Lonicera japonica var. chinensis (P.Watson) Baker	Corolla purple outside, white inside. Usually diploid 2n=18	China (Anhui, 安徽省 in Chinese) around 800 meters
	Lonicera japonica var. japonica	Vigorous vine, Corolla white, later yellow-white. Usually diploid 2n=18	Grows on the edge of forest in China, Japan, and Korea
	Lonicera japonica var. miyagusukiana Makino	Tetraploid with chromosome number of 2n=36	Found in tops of exposed windy limestone cliffs in Ryukyus Islands, Japan

== Ecology ==
The flowers can also be a significant source of food for deer, rabbits, hummingbirds, and other wildlife.

=== As an invasive species ===
Japanese honeysuckle has become naturalized in Argentina, Australia, Brazil, Mexico, New Zealand, and much of the United States, including Hawaii, as well as a number of Pacific and Caribbean islands. It is classified as a noxious weed in 46 states, being prohibited to be bought and sold in Connecticut, Illinois, Massachusetts, and Vermont, and banned in Indiana and New Hampshire. It is on the New Hampshire invasive species list.

Lonicera japonica was initially brought to the U.S. from Japan in the early 1800s as an ornamental plant. It is still deliberately planted in the U.S. for reasons such as erosion control or forage for deer, but has become invasive in many areas. It prefers to invade areas that have been disturbed, such as roadsides or floodplains. It will generally only invade forests when the canopy has been opened by logging or fallen trees, as it grows less vigorously in the shade. Once it has invaded an area, Lonicera japonica grows rapidly and outcompetes native plants for sunlight and nutrients. It proliferates using both sexual and vegetative reproduction, producing seeds that are spread by animals and expanding locally via rhizomes. Eventually, it will form a dense thicket which prevents other plant species from germinating in that area. Due to its suppression of germination in the understory, Lonicera japonica also prevents the regeneration of trees.

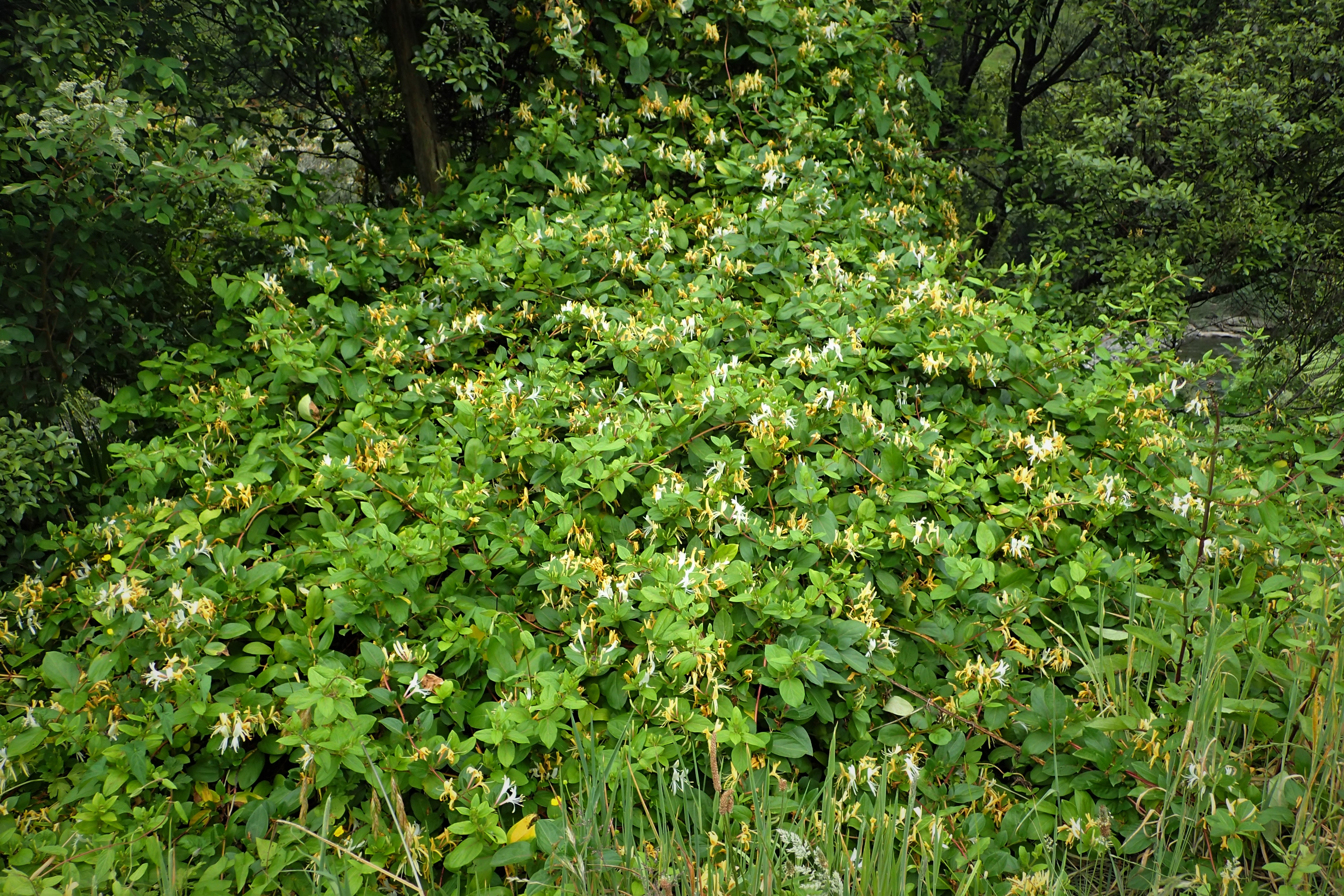
Lonicera japonica's rapid growth allows it to outcompete other plants in the areas it invades.

Management of invasive Lonicera japonica has been achieved through a variety of means. Small patches can be removed by hand, or using simple digging tools, but all plant parts including roots and rhizomes must be removed to prevent resprouting. Larger patches can be removed through repeated mowing, but application of herbicide is also recommended to prevent regrowth. There has been some study of using controlled burns to remove L. japonica, but the underground portion of the plant is usually able to survive and resprout, limiting the effectiveness of this method. Browsing by herbivores may limit its growth, but is unlikely to eliminate it.

==== Biological control ====
The EPA of New Zealand approved the release of Limenitis glorifica butterflies in 2013 as a biological control for Lonicera japonica. This butterfly is host specific for Japanese honeysuckle, but it may incidentally feed on other closely related plants, including Himalayan honeysuckle Leycesteria formosa. Oberea shirahatai is a Japanese honeysuckle host-specific beetle that feeds on the stems and leaves of Japanese honeysuckle. It was released in New Zealand in 2018 as another L. japonica-specialist biological control.

== Cultivation ==
Even though it is a highly invasive and destructive plant, this species is often sold by American nurseries as the cultivar 'Hall's Prolific' (Lonicera japonica var. halliana), and in the UK as the cultivar 'Halliana'. The cultivar is also known as Hall's Japanese honeysuckle. It is an effective groundcover and has strong-smelling flowers. It can be cultivated by seed, cuttings, or layering. In addition, it will spread itself via shoots if given enough space to grow. The variety L. japonica var. repens has gained the Royal Horticultural Society's Award of Garden Merit.

== Toxicity ==
All parts of the plant other than the flower nectar have the potential to be toxic if consumed in a very large quantity for its saponin.

== Uses ==
In traditional Chinese medicine, Lonicera japonica is called rěn dōng téng (忍冬藤); literally "winter enduring vine") or jīn yín huā (Chinese: 金銀花; literally "gold-silver flower", in reference to the presence of flowers of different age on the same plant as each flower changes from white (silver) to yellow (gold)). Alternative Chinese names include er hua (二花) and shuang hua (雙花), meaning double-[color] flowers.
