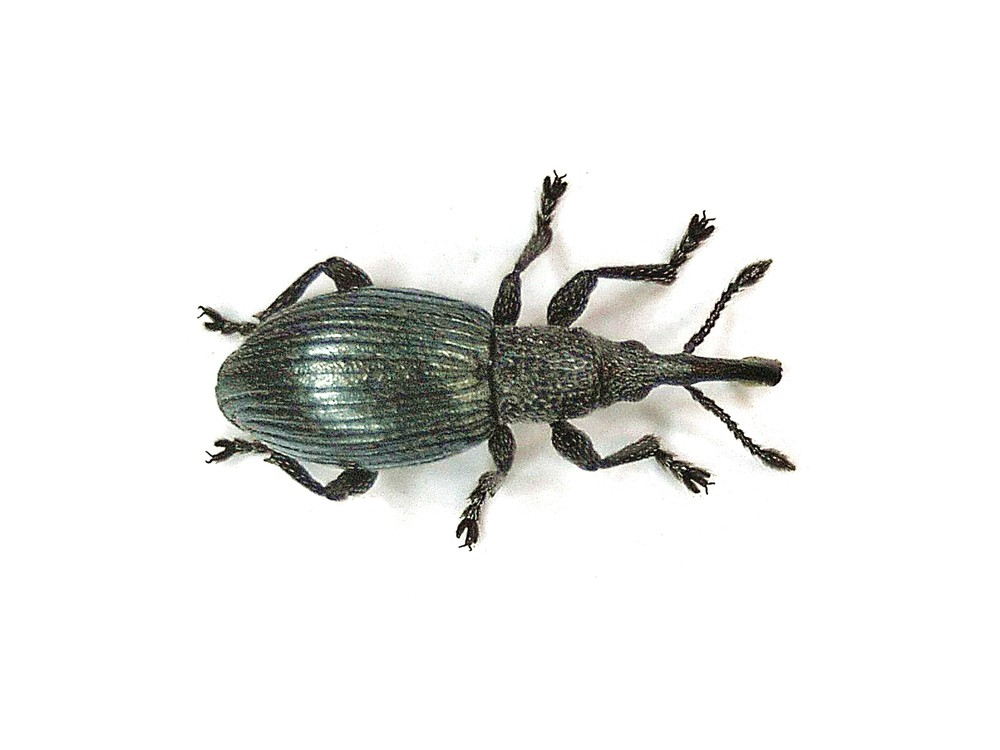
- Ceratapion Onopordi

Scientific classification
- Domain: Eukaryota
- Kingdom: Animalia
- Phylum: Arthropoda
- Class: Insecta
- Order: Coleoptera
- Suborder: Polyphaga
- Infraorder: Cucujiformia
- Family: Brentidae
- Subfamily: Apioninae
- Genus: Ceratapion; Schilsky, 1901

= Ceratapion =

Genus of beetles

Ceratapion is a genus of beetles belonging to the family Apionidae.

The species of this genus are found in Europe and Northern America.

Species:

- Ceratapion armatum (Gerstaecker, 1854)
- Ceratapion austriacum (Wagner, 1904)
