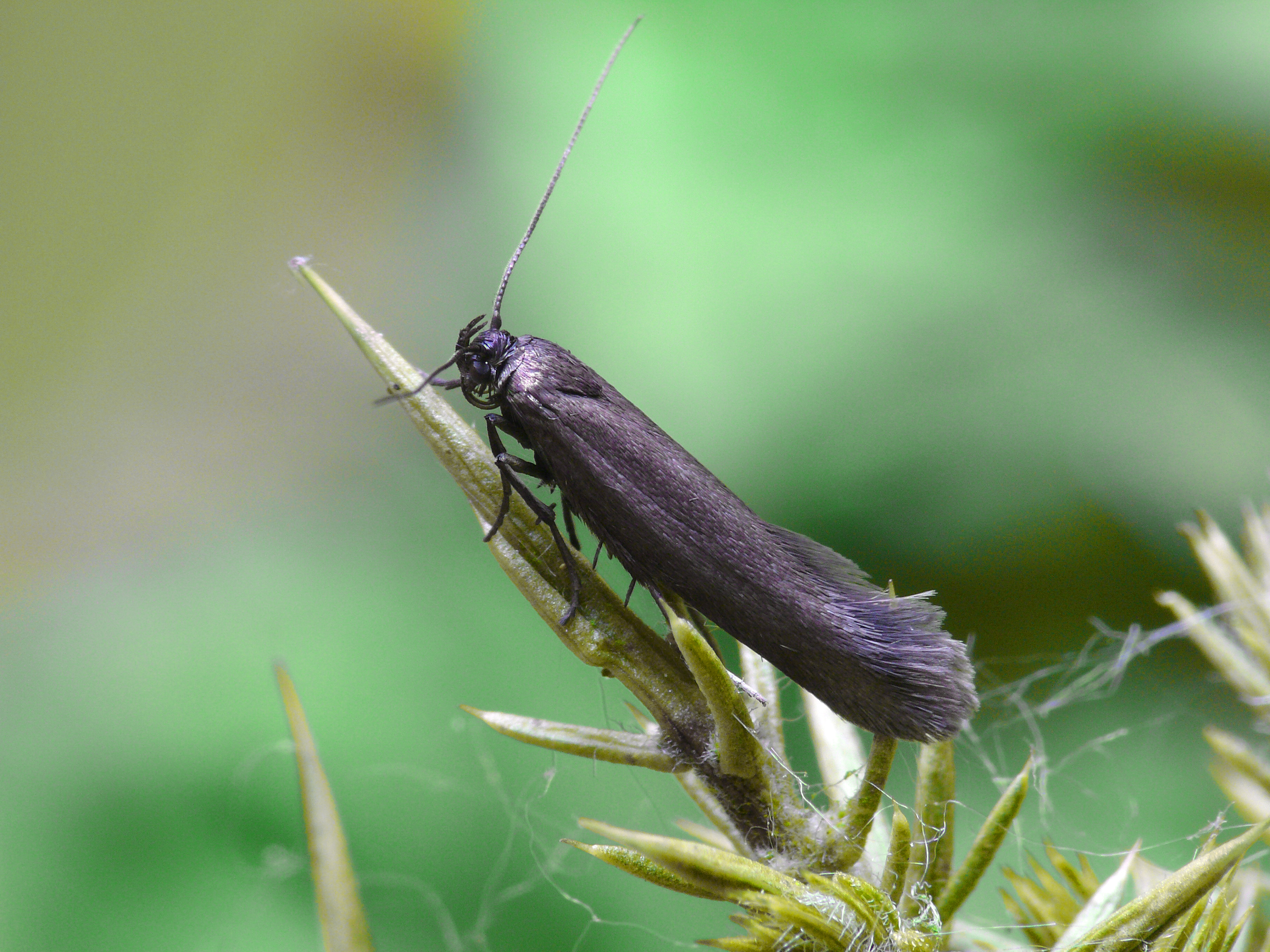

Scientific classification
- Kingdom: Animalia
- Phylum: Arthropoda
- Class: Insecta
- Order: Lepidoptera
- Family: Scythrididae
- Genus: Scythris
- Species: S. grandipennis

Binomial name
- Scythris grandipennis (Haworth, 1828)

Synonyms
- Porrectaria grandipennis Haworth, 1828

= Scythris grandipennis =

Species of moth

Scythris grandipennis is a moth of the family Scythrididae found in Europe.

== Description ==
The moth flies mainly during the day and has a wingspan of circa 12–20mm. The bronze forewings are long, pointed with a few whitish scales in the disc.

The gregarious larvae make a silk web and feed on the shoots of the food plant which include Spanish gorse (Genista hispanica), Genista sagittalis, dyer's greenweed (Genista tinctoria), European gorse (Ulex europaeus) and dwarf gorse (Ulex minor).
