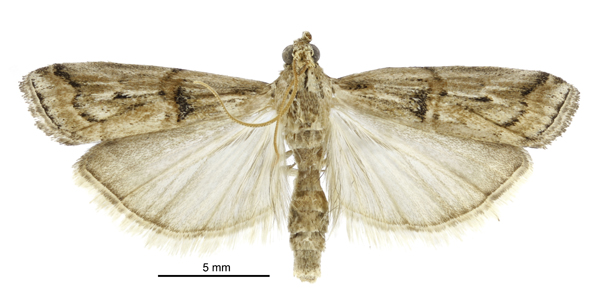
- Male

Scientific classification
- Domain: Eukaryota
- Kingdom: Animalia
- Phylum: Arthropoda
- Class: Insecta
- Order: Lepidoptera
- Family: Pyralidae
- Genus: Pempelia
- Species: P. genistella

Binomial name
- Pempelia genistella (Duponchel, 1836)

Synonyms
- Phycis genistella Duponchel, 1836; Nephopterix genistella

= Pempelia genistella =

Species of moth

Pempelia genistella, the gorse colonial hard shoot moth, is a moth of the family Pyralidae. It is native to south-western Europe and north-western Africa, but has been introduced as a biological control agent for gorse in New Zealand and Hawaii.

The wingspan is 26–29 mm. Adults are on wing in July in western Europe.

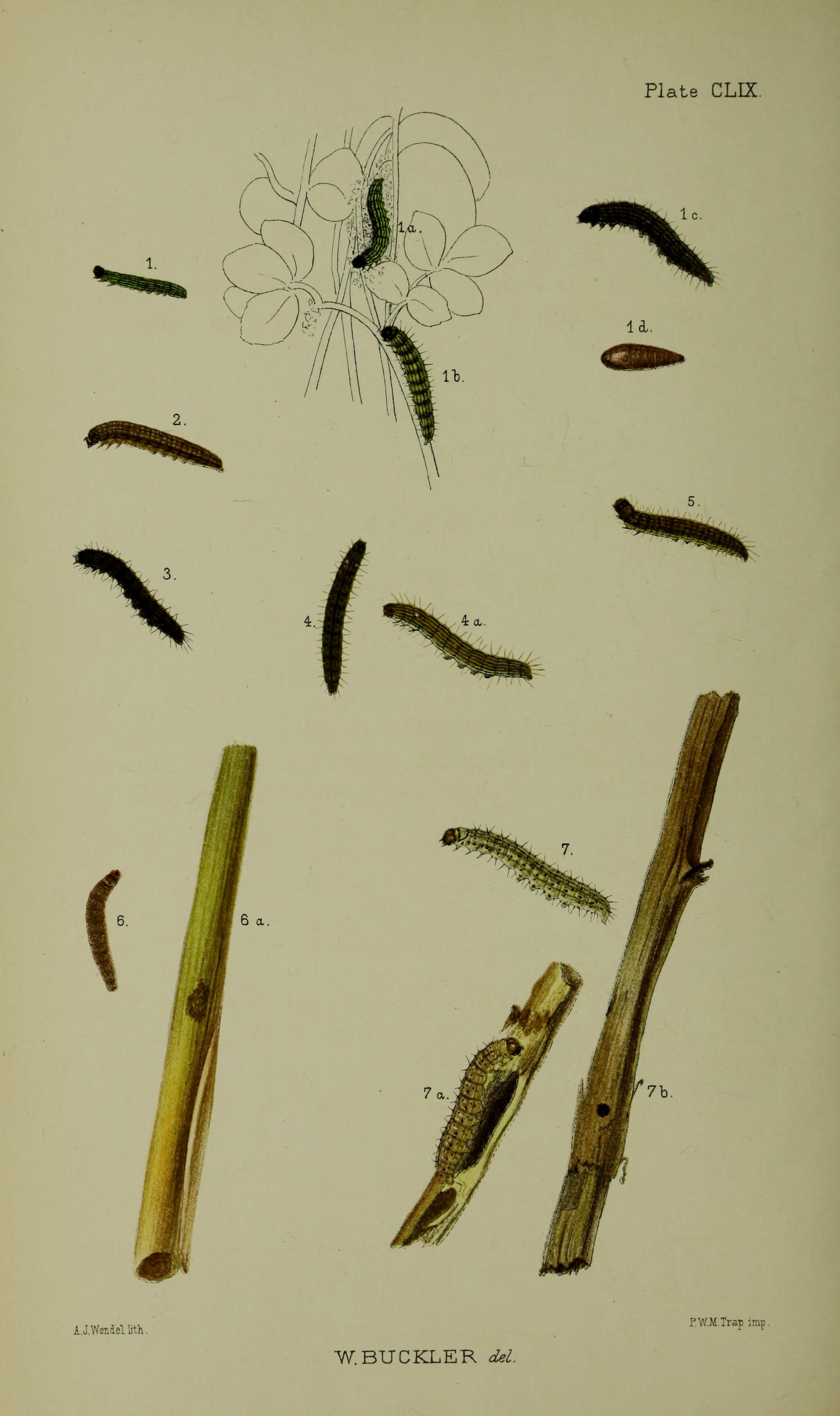
Fig. 2 larva after final moult
