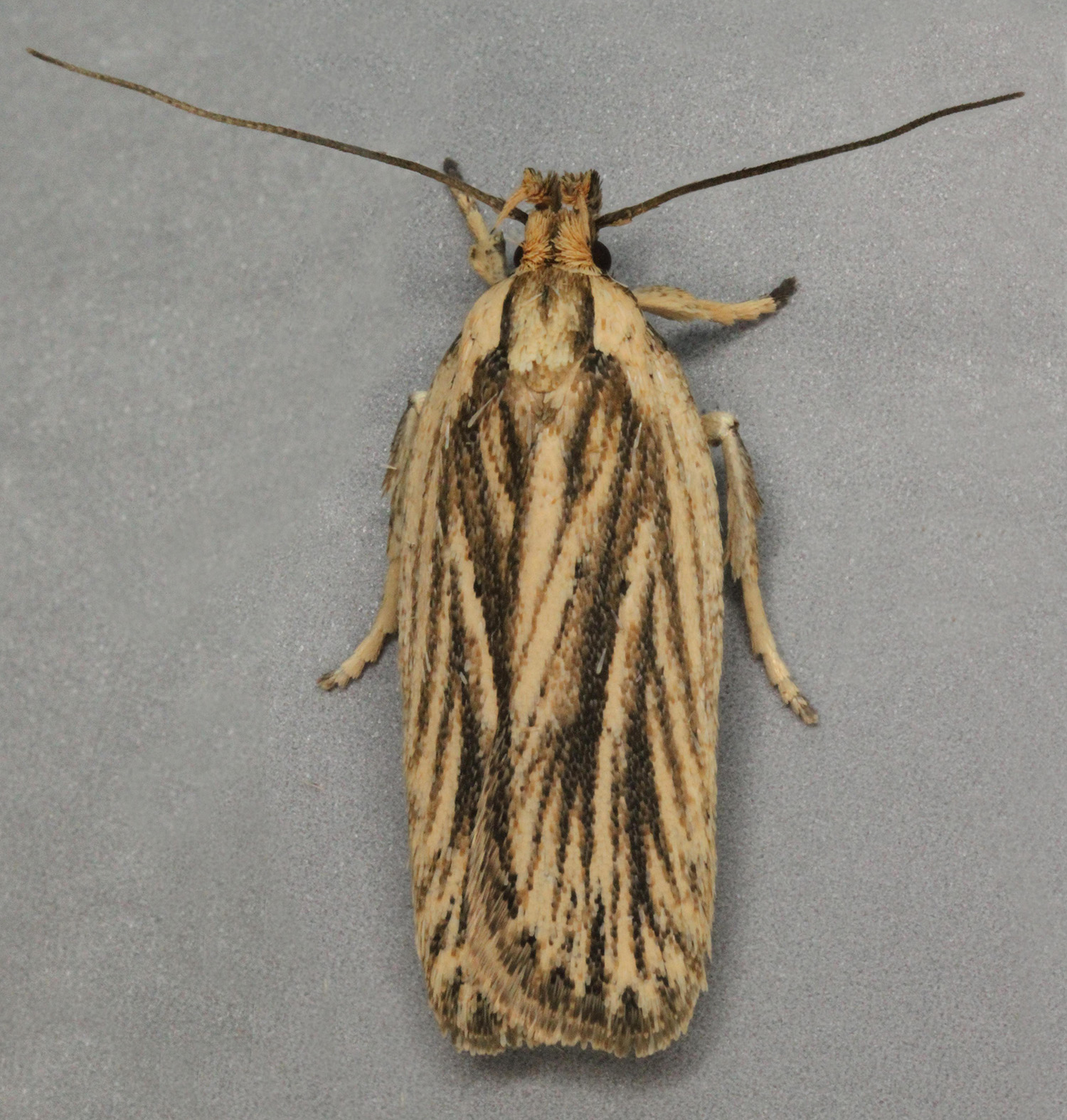

Scientific classification
- Kingdom: Animalia
- Phylum: Arthropoda
- Clade: Pancrustacea
- Class: Insecta
- Order: Lepidoptera
- Family: Depressariidae
- Genus: Agonopterix
- Species: A. umbellana

Binomial name
- Agonopterix umbellana (Fabricius, 1794)

Synonyms
- Pyralis umbellana Fabricius, 1794; Depressaria lennigiella Fuchs, 1880; Depressaria prostratella Constant, 1884; Depressaria ulicetella Stainton, 1849; Agonopterix ulicetella (Stainton, 1849); Agonopterix umbellana f. knitschkei Predota, 1934

= Agonopterix umbellana =

Gorse soft shoot moth

Species of moth

Agonopterix umbellana (gorse soft shoot moth) is a moth of the family Depressariidae. It is native to western Europe, but was introduced to Hawaii in 1988 and New Zealand in 1990 to control Ulex europaeus.

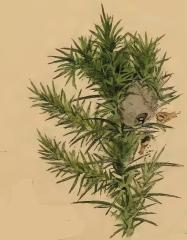
A sprig of Ulex nanus with a larval web

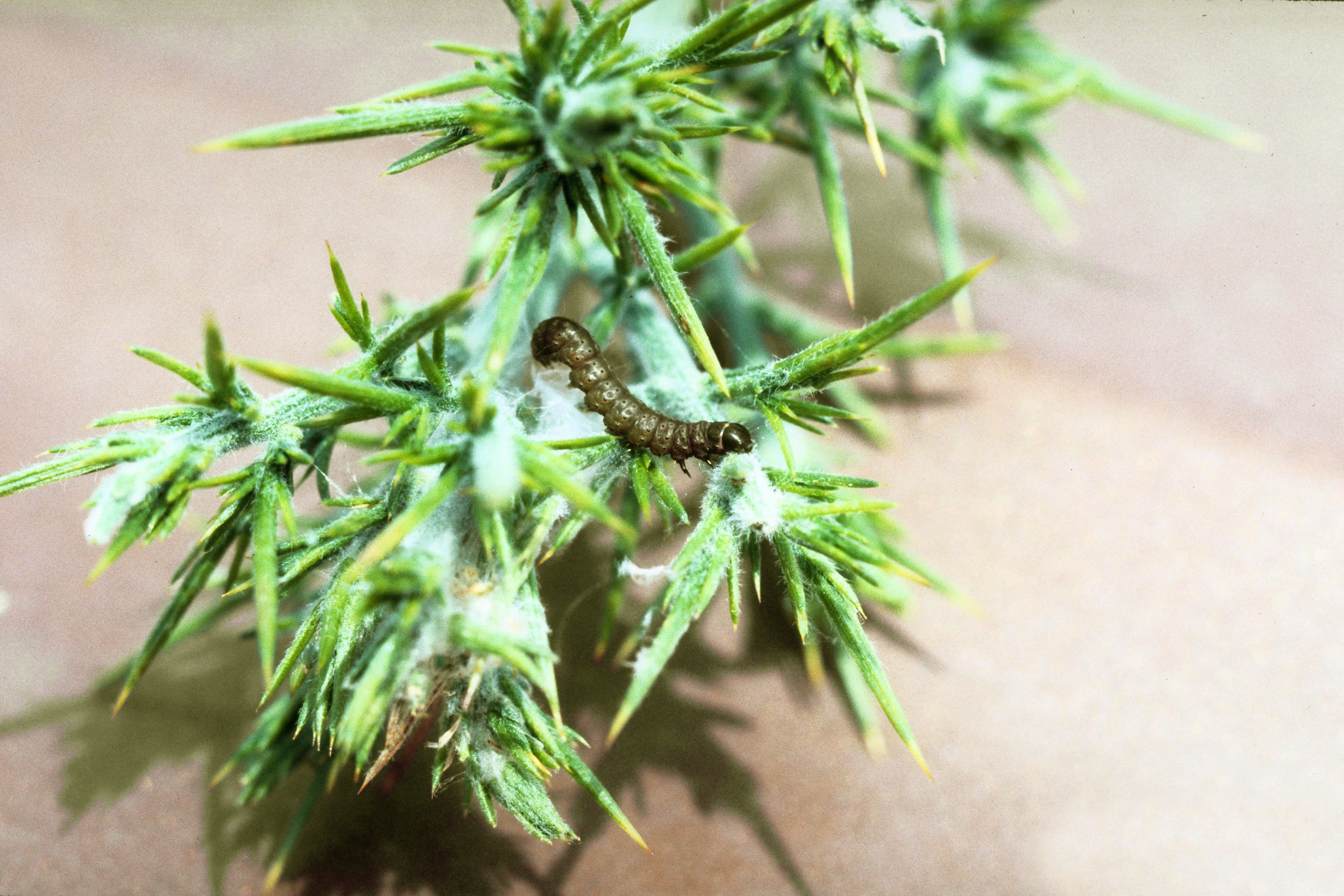
Larva

The wingspan is about 21 mm. The forewings are whitish ochreous; veins and dorsum marked with dark fuscous lines; first and sometimes second discal stigmata black; terminal black dots. Hindwings pale whitish-grey, round apex sometimes interruptedly dark-edged. The larva is dull green; dots black; head and plate of 2 black.

Adults are on wing from August to April. It hibernates during winter and can reappear in the early spring.

The larvae feed on Ulex and Genista species within silken tubes.
