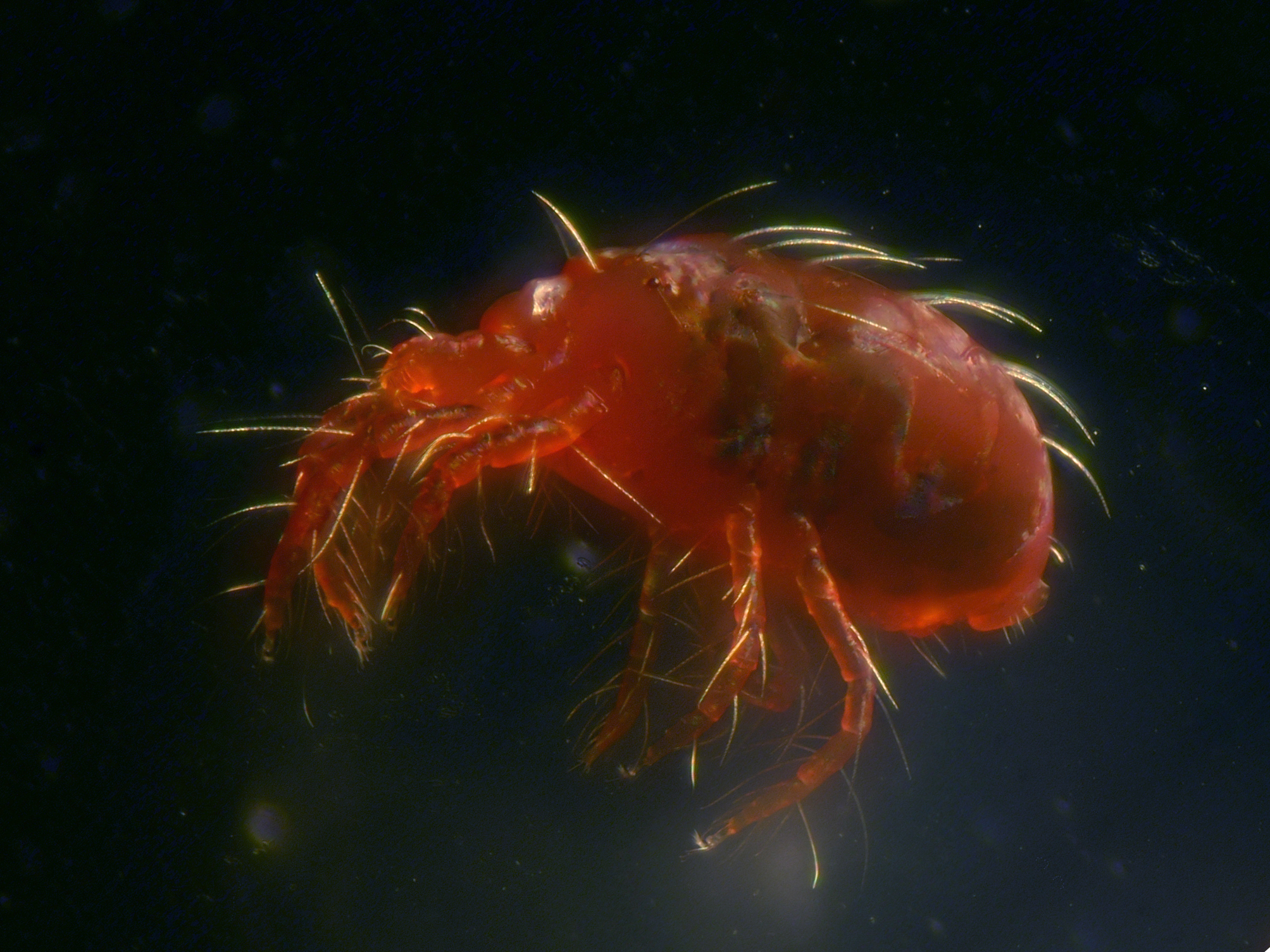
- Spider mite, microscopic view

Scientific classification
- Kingdom: Animalia
- Phylum: Arthropoda
- Subphylum: Chelicerata
- Class: Arachnida
- Order: Trombidiformes
- Family: Tetranychidae
- Genus: Tetranychus
- Species: T. lintearius

Binomial name
- Tetranychus lintearius Dufour, 1832

= Tetranychus lintearius =

Species of mite

Tetranychus lintearius, the gorse spider mite, is a species of spider mite. It is used as an agent of biological pest control on common gorse, a noxious weed in some countries.

The adult mite is half a millimeter long and bright red. It lives in colonies in a shelter of spun silk spanning many branch tips. Infested plants are easily identifiable by these cobweb-like sheets of silk, which can grow quite large. The female lays one to four eggs per day during her three- to four-week adult lifespan. The tiny nymph is small enough to disperse on the wind during its first stage. Those that stay behind populate the colony as it expands.

This mite is native to Europe, where it does more damage to the plant than any other organism. The mite appears to be host-specific; it does not attack any other plants. The adult and nymph damage the plant by piercing its tissues during feeding. Heavy mite activity reduces flowering and can stunt the development of the branches.

It is widespread in parts of Australia, including Tasmania. It was introduced to the northwestern United States and Hawaii in the 1990s, where it is now established in gorse. The mite has natural predators, including another mite (Phytoseiulus persimilis) and a species of ladybird (Stethorus punctillum), which can severely reduce its population.

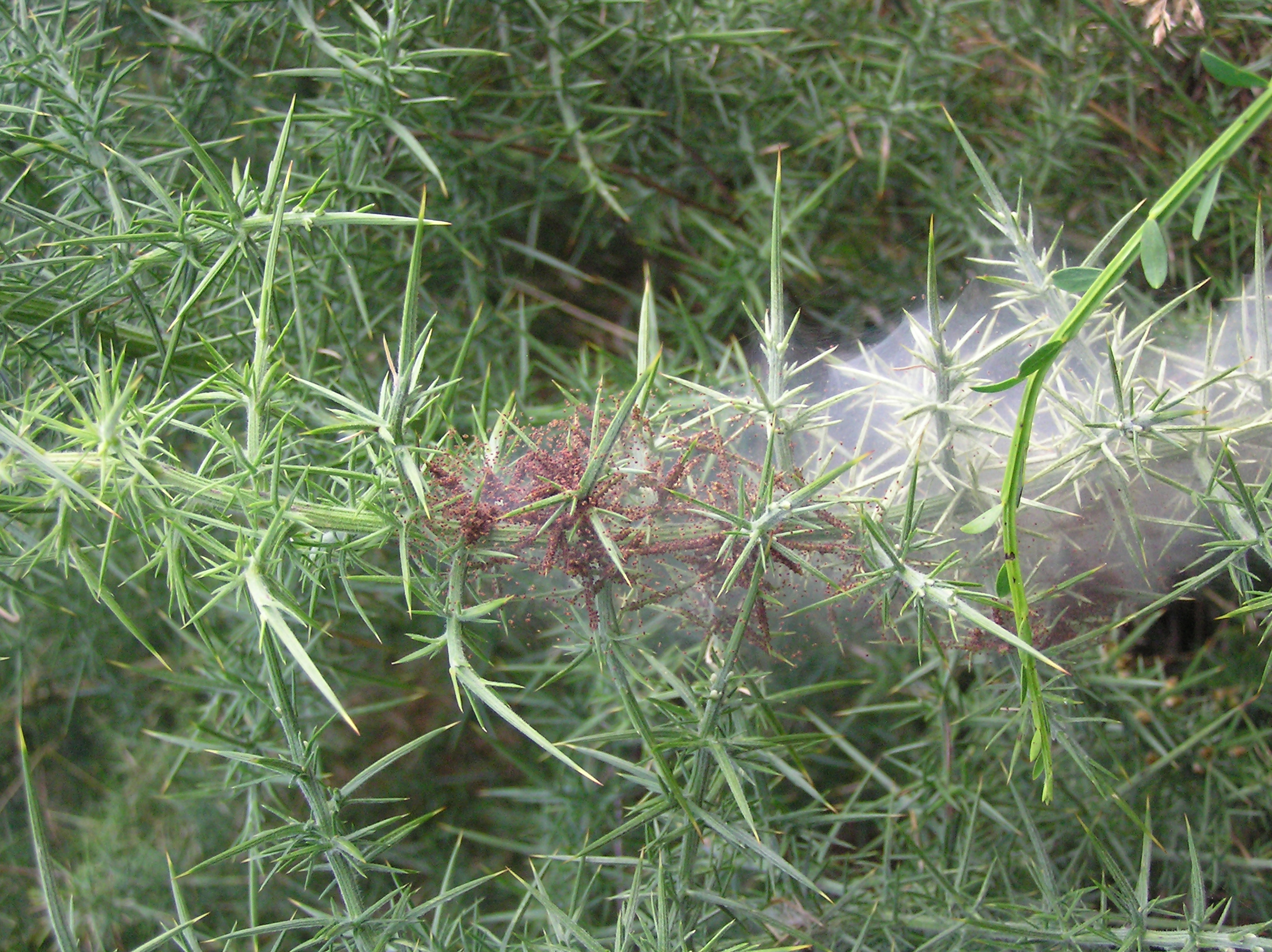
Mites within their protective silk enclosure on a gorse plant

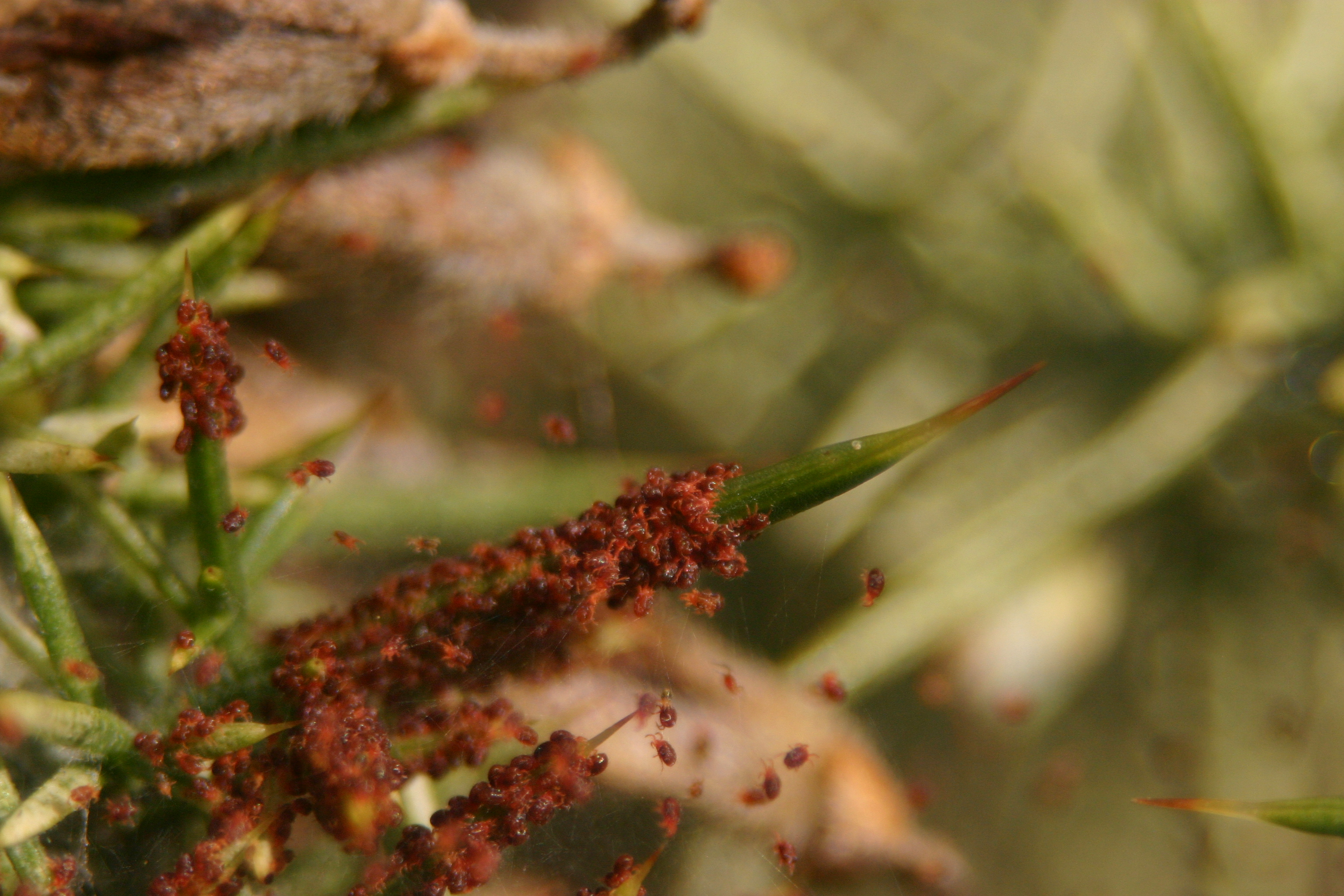
Closer view, mites on a gorse plant
