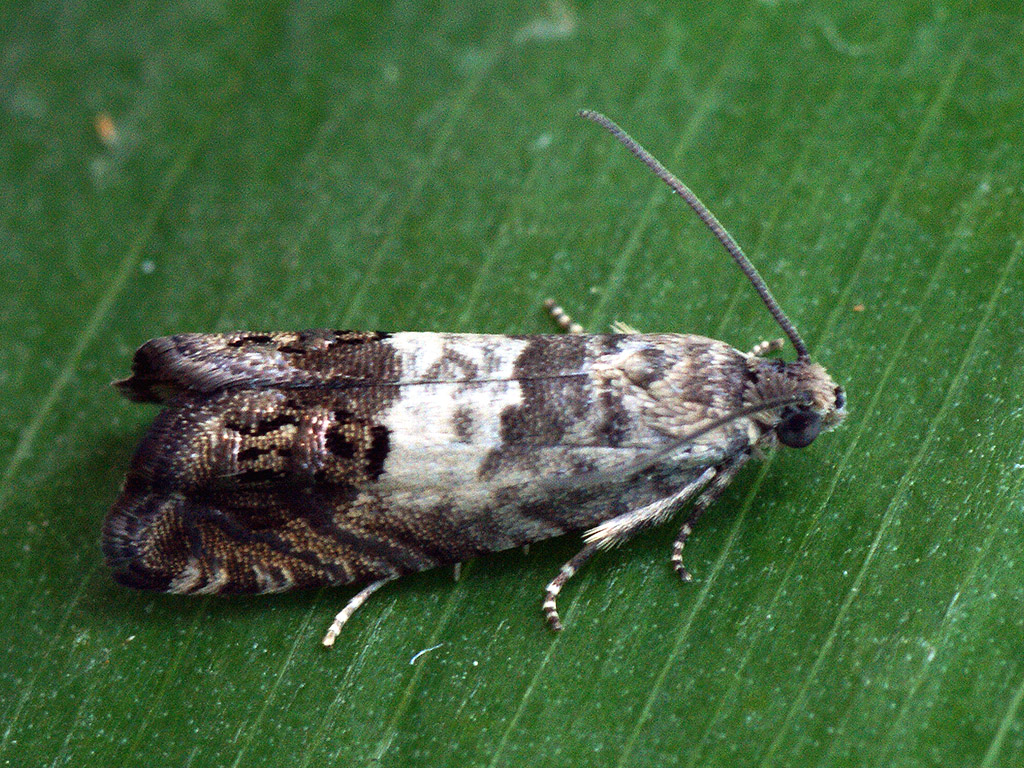
- Cydia succedana Moscow Oblast

Scientific classification
- Kingdom: Animalia
- Phylum: Arthropoda
- Class: Insecta
- Order: Lepidoptera
- Family: Tortricidae
- Genus: Cydia
- Species: C. succedana

Binomial name
- Cydia succedana (Denis & Schiffermüller, 1775)

= Cydia succedana =

Species of moth

Cydia succedana, or Gorse Pod Moth is a species of moth of the family Tortricidae. It is found in Europe and has been introduced to New Zealand.

The wingspan is 11–16 mm.The forewings have an irregular white cross-band (usually not reaching the costal edge), otherwise some white costal spots and a pair of more or less blurry, silvery slashes at the apex. It is not possible to distinguish safely between this species and Cydia albipicta based on external appearance, one must examine the genitals where there are clear differences.

The moth flies from April to September depending on the location.

The larvae feed on Ulex europaeus, Genista, Lotus and Cytisus scoparius. The larva is used as an agent to biologically control gorse in New Zealand feeding on the seeds.
