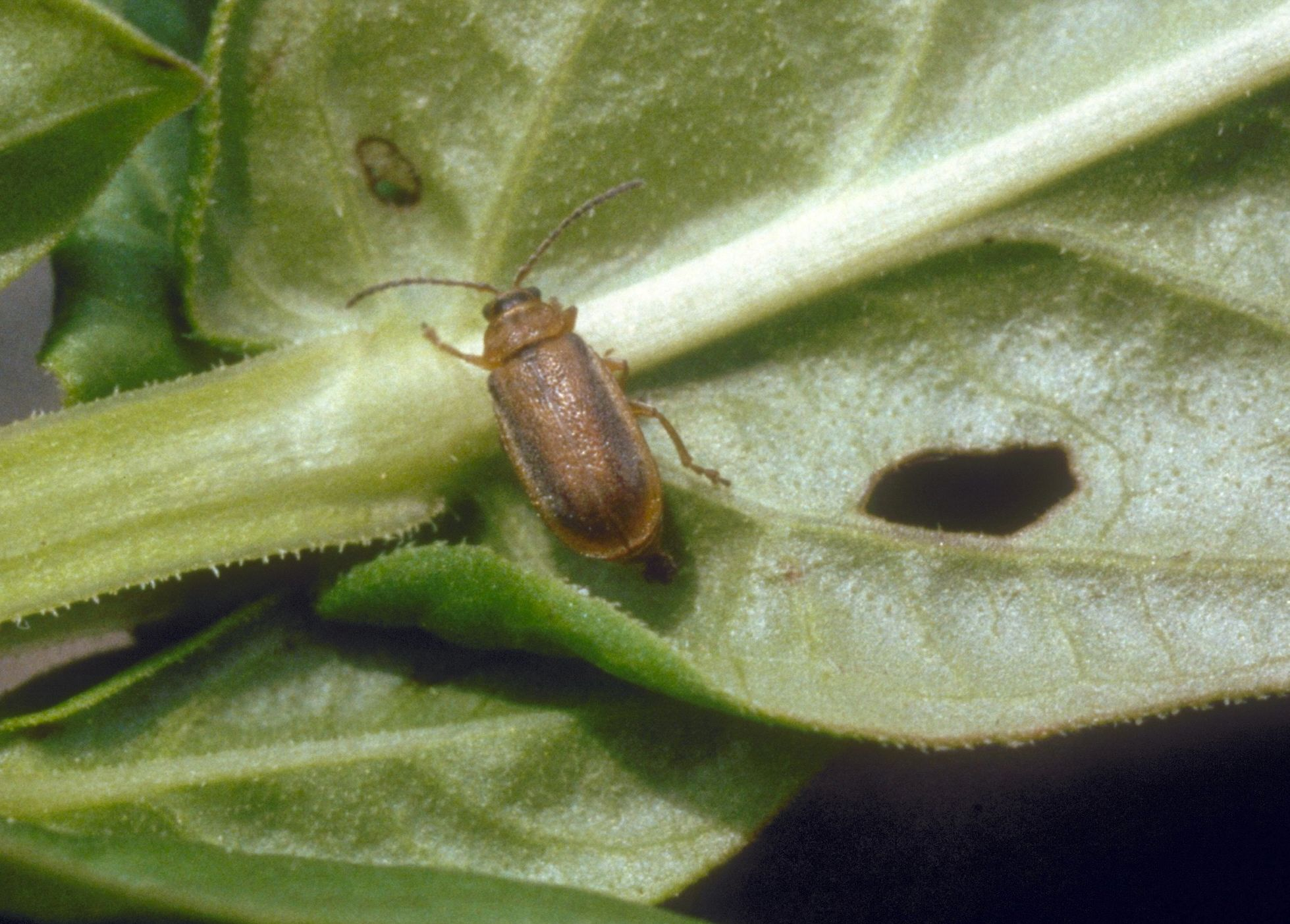

Scientific classification
- Kingdom: Animalia
- Phylum: Arthropoda
- Class: Insecta
- Order: Coleoptera
- Suborder: Polyphaga
- Infraorder: Cucujiformia
- Family: Chrysomelidae
- Genus: Galerucella
- Species: G. calmariensis

Binomial name
- Galerucella calmariensis (Linnaeus, 1767)

Synonyms
- Chrysomela calmariensis Linnaeus, 1767; Neogalerucella calmariensis (Linnaeus, 1767)

= Galerucella calmariensis =

Species of beetle

Galerucella calmariensis, sometimes Neogalerucella calmariensis, is a species of leaf beetle in the family Chrysomelidae. It is commonly known as the black-margined loosestrife beetle and is native to Europe and Northern Asia (excluding China) where both adults and larvae feed on purple loosestrife (Lythrum salicaria). It has been introduced in North America as a biological control agent for purple loosestrife.

== Description ==
The black-margined loosestrife beetle is cylindrical in shape, mid brown, three to six millimetres long and half that width. When seen from above it often has two blackish lateral lines down either side. The eggs are spherical, white and usually topped with frass. The larvae are yellow speckled with black and resemble small caterpillars.

== Biology ==
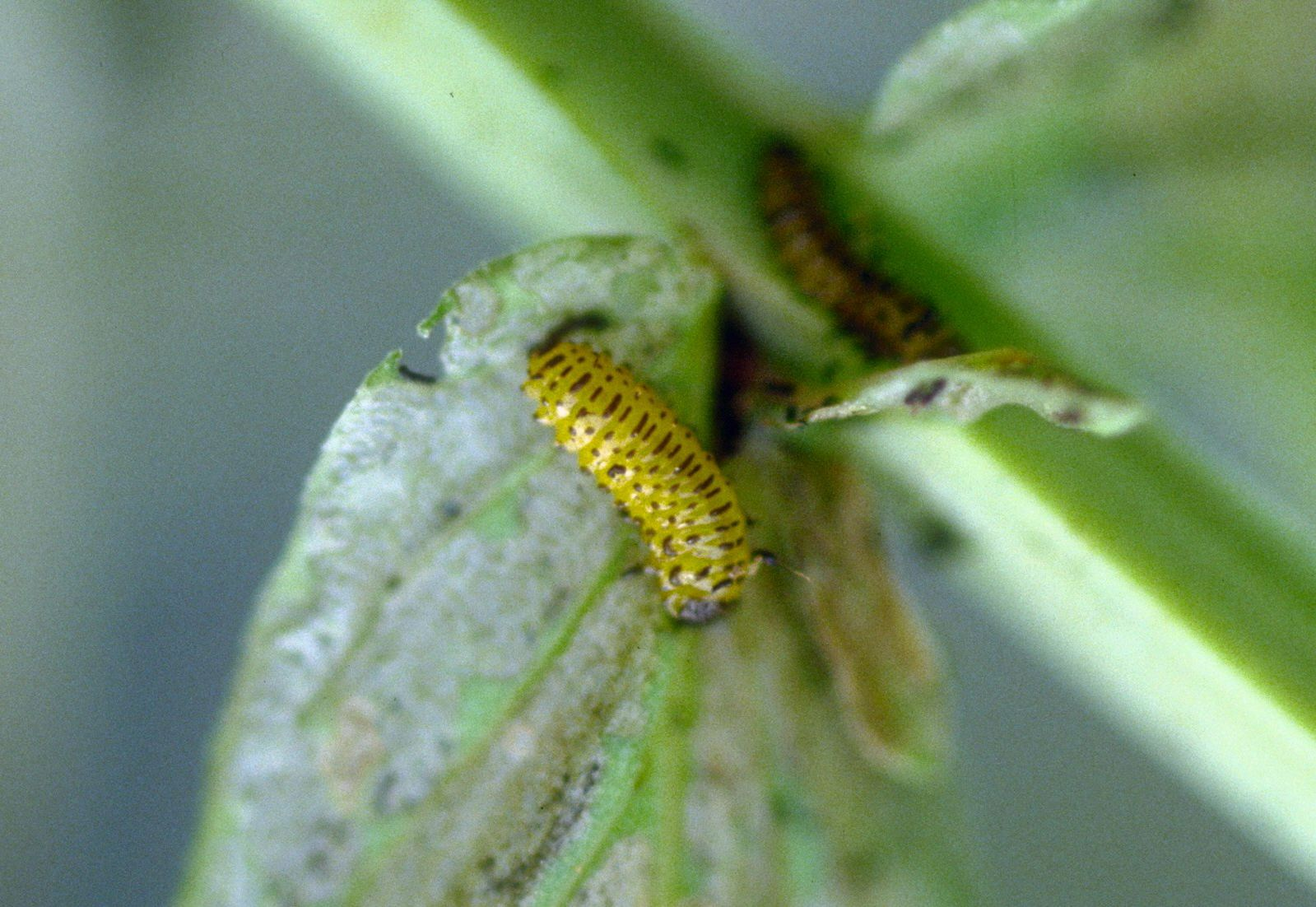
Black-margined loosestrife beetle larva

Adults overwinter in leaf litter near purple loosestrife plants. They emerge in the spring and start to feed on the young growth. They cause damage to the leaves characterised by neat rounded shot holes between the veins. The females lay up to 500 eggs from May to July in small batches on leaves and stems. On hatching, the first instar larvae feed on growing shoot tips and may kill them. Later instars feed on stems and leaves leaving the upper cuticle of the leaf intact. When the density of the larvae is high enough, the plant can be completely defoliated. After feeding for about three weeks and undergoing further moults, the larvae move down the plant to pupate in the soil or leaf litter. If the water level is high, larvae sometimes pupate in the hollow aerenchyma tissue in the plant stems. Both adults and larvae can float and may be wafted by water currents or wind to new host plants.

== Damage ==
Larval damage to buds and shoots reduces the growth of the purple loosestrife plant and its ability to flower and produce seed. Damage to the leaves reduces their photosynthetic capability and means there is less starch stored in the roots which may cause plant death in adverse winter conditions. It also results in less vigorous plants which do not compete so strongly with native plant species such as cattails, grasses and sedges.

== Use in biological control ==
Purple loosestrife is a native of Europe, Asia, northwest Africa and parts of Australia. In these countries a number of insects are associated with it. These include the weevil Hylobius transversovittatus and the leaf beetles G. calmariensis and G. pusilla. When purple loosestrife was introduced into North America no insects were available to keep it under control and it became rampant. It is now found in large stands throughout the northeastern United States, southeastern Canada and the American Midwest where it crowds out other species and is a threat to biodiversity.

The black-margined loosestrife beetle and the closely related golden loosestrife beetle (Neogalerucella pusilla) have been released in over 27 states in the United States and 6 Canadian provinces. The adults of both species have become well established and proved very effective. They show great ability to find new stands of the host plant and can locate patches of purple loosestrife a kilometre away within a few days of emergence.

Before these beetles were introduced to North America, the susceptibility of approximately 50 native plants of North America to the beetles was tested in Europe. Among the plants were several close relatives of purple loosestrife. Only winged loosestrife (Lythrum alatum) proved to be susceptible, and was not used by the beetles as a host when purple loosestrife was available.
