= Peplis portula =

Peplis portula is a botanical synonym of two species of plant:

- Ludwigia palustris, synonym published in 1818 by Franz von Paula Schrank
- Lythrum portula, original name of the species published in 1753 by Carl Linnaeus
