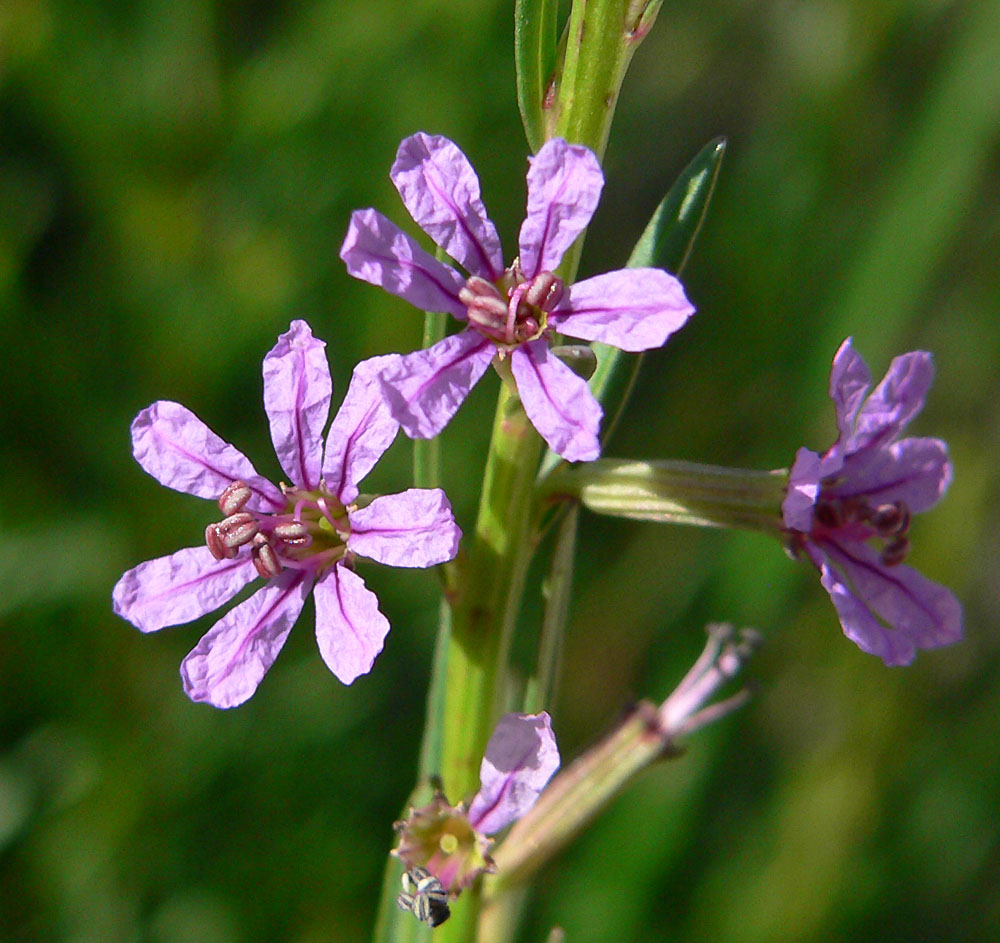

Conservation status
- Apparently Secure (NatureServe)

Scientific classification
- Kingdom: Plantae
- Clade: Tracheophytes
- Clade: Angiosperms
- Clade: Eudicots
- Clade: Rosids
- Order: Myrtales
- Family: Lythraceae
- Genus: Lythrum
- Species: L. californicum

Binomial name
- Lythrum californicum Torr. & A.Gray

= Lythrum californicum =

Species of flowering plant

Lythrum californicum is a species of flowering plant in the loosestrife family known by the common name California loosestrife. It is native to northern Mexico and the southwestern United States into the Midwest as far east as Oklahoma and Texas. It often grows in moist habitat. This is an erect perennial herb reaching 20 to 60 cm (7.9 to 23.6 in) tall, sometimes branching. The waxy linear to lance-shaped leaves are arranged oppositely lower on the plant, and alternately toward the top. They are 1 to 7 cm (0.39 to 2.76 in) in length. The inflorescence is a terminal spike of flowers with purple petals under a centimeter long. Flowers are heterostylous on one individual plant, with some having long, protruding styles and some with shorter styles not protruding from the mouth of the flower. The fruit is an oval capsule containing many minute seeds.

This plant resembles its relative, the notorious noxious weed purple loosestrife, but California loosestrife is usually not weedy.
