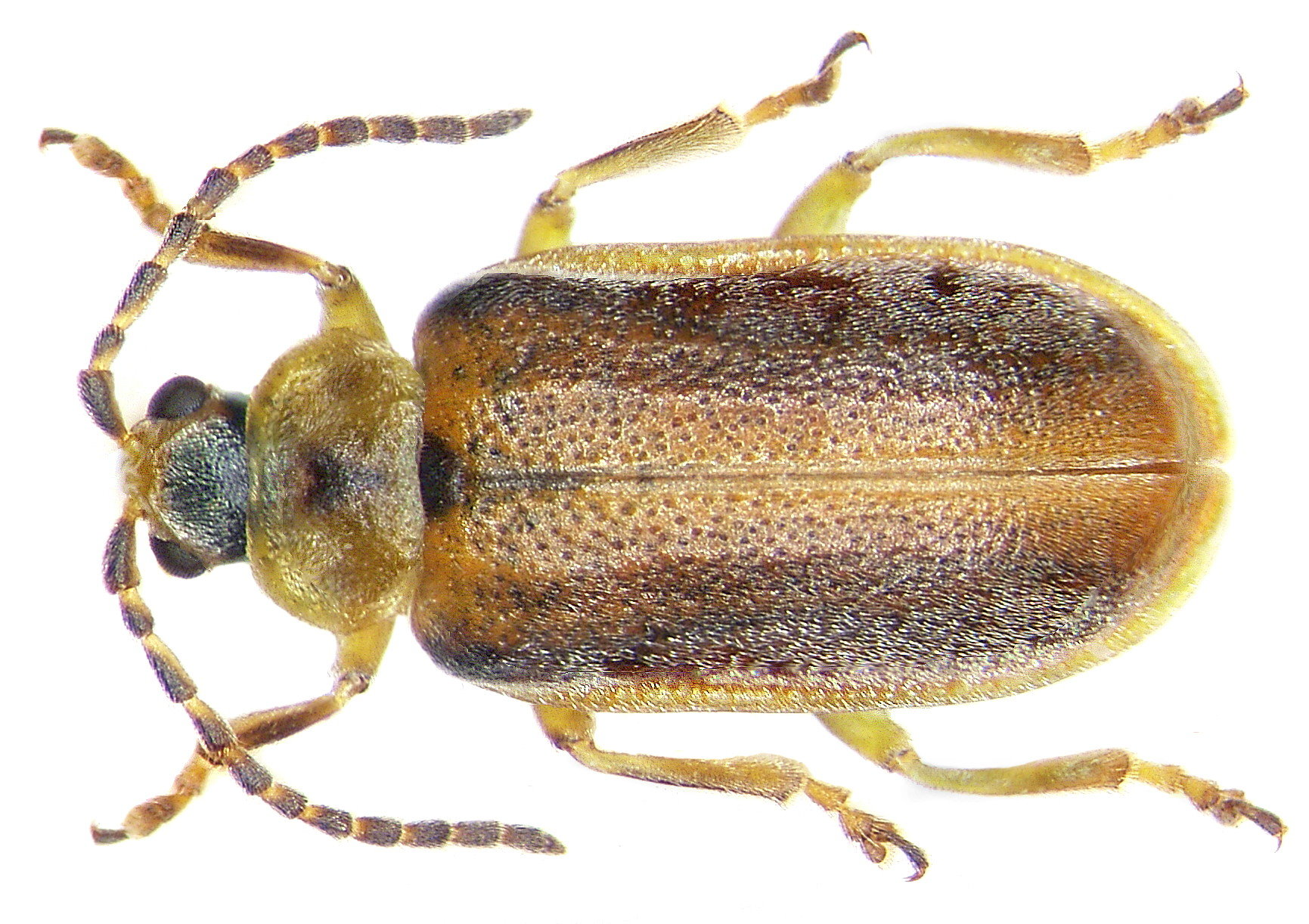
- Neogalerucella lineola

Scientific classification
- Kingdom: Animalia
- Phylum: Arthropoda
- Clade: Pancrustacea
- Class: Insecta
- Order: Coleoptera
- Suborder: Polyphaga
- Infraorder: Cucujiformia
- Family: Chrysomelidae
- Subfamily: Galerucinae
- Tribe: Galerucini
- Genus: Neogalerucella; Chûjô, 1962

= Neogalerucella =

Genus of beetles

Neogalerucella is a genus of purple loosestrife beetles in the family Chrysomelidae. There are at least four described species in Neogalerucella. It is sometimes considered a subgenus of the genus Galerucella.

== Species ==
These four species belong to the genus Neogalerucella:

- Neogalerucella calmariensis (Linnaeus, 1767) (black-margined loosestrife beetle)
- Neogalerucella pusilla (Duftschmid, 1825)
- Neogalerucella quebecensis (Brown, 1938)
- Neogalerucella stefanssoni (Brown, 1938)
