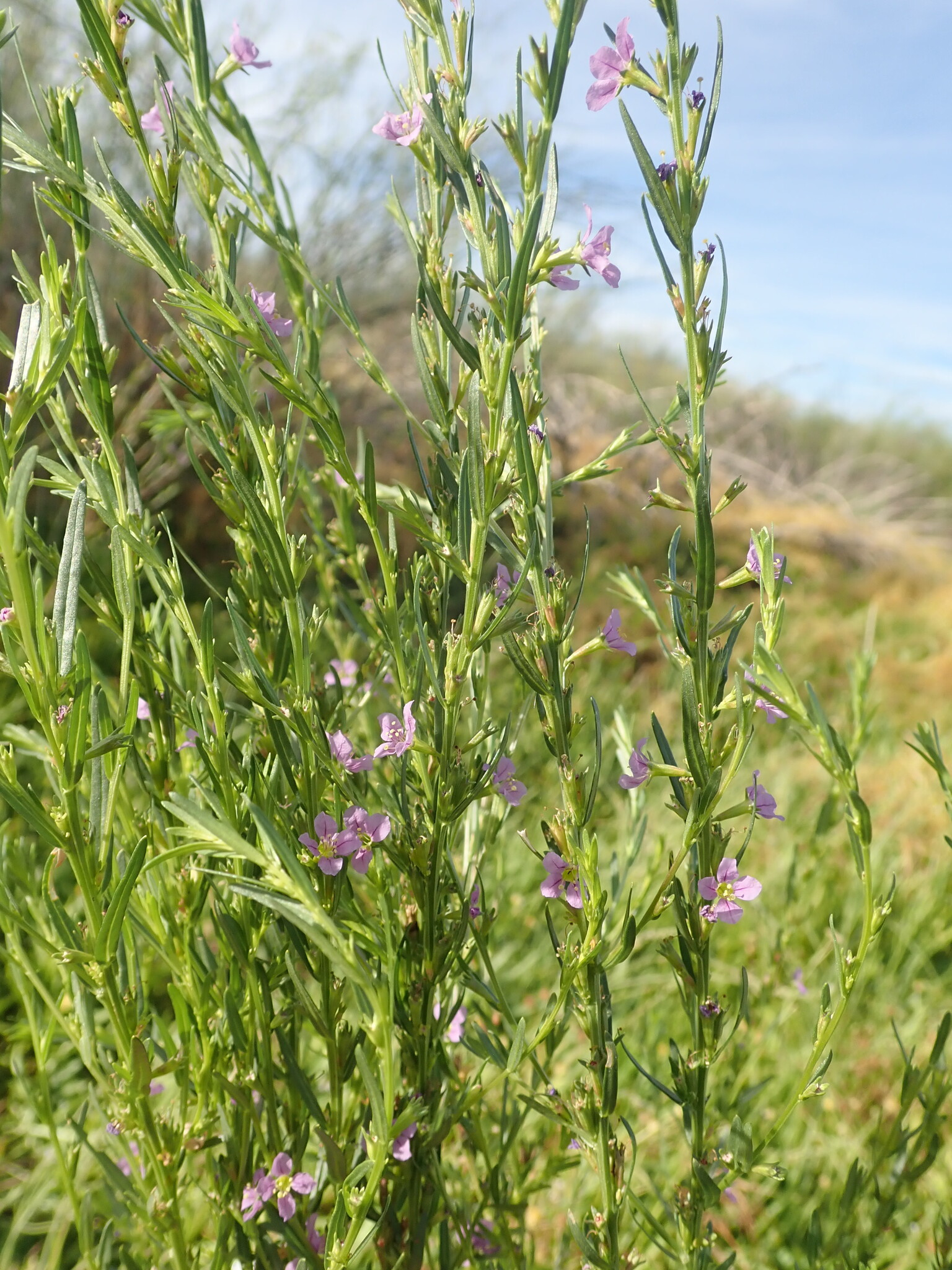
- on higher land in a lignum swamp, Narran Lake, NSW (2025-03-16)

Scientific classification
- Kingdom: Plantae
- Clade: Tracheophytes
- Clade: Angiosperms
- Clade: Eudicots
- Clade: Rosids
- Order: Myrtales
- Family: Lythraceae
- Genus: Lythrum
- Species: L. paradoxum

Binomial name
- Lythrum paradoxum Koehne

= Lythrum paradoxum =

Plant species in the loosestrife family

Lythrum paradoxum is a plant in the Lythraceae family and was first described in 1897 by Bernhard Adalbert Emil Koehne.

It is an erect woody plant growing to heights of 0.6 to 1 m.

It is native to all mainland states of Australia, where it is found in sandy or alluvial soils along creeks and drainage areas (in damp places).
