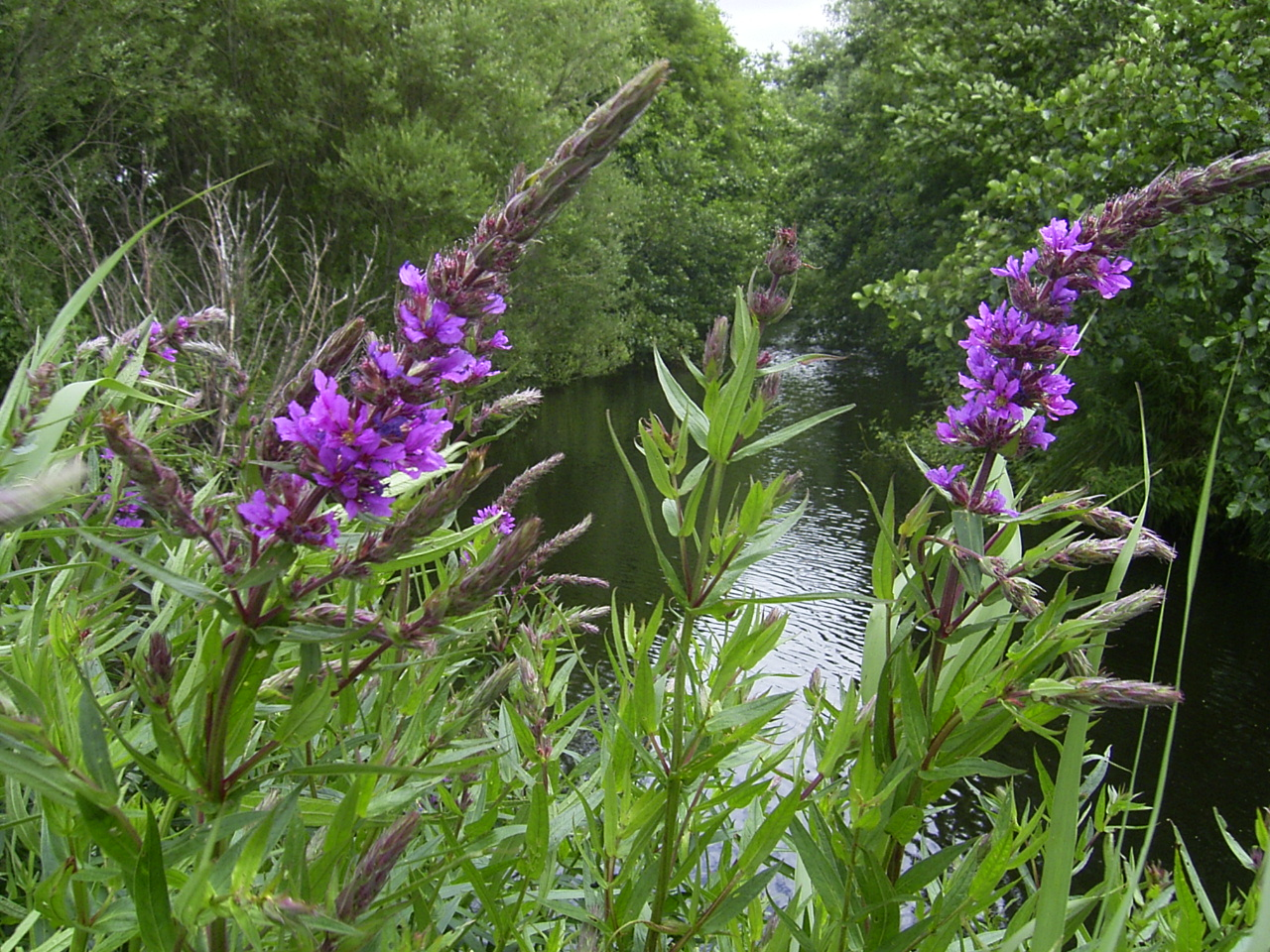
- Lythrum salicaria

Scientific classification
- Kingdom: Plantae
- Clade: Tracheophytes
- Clade: Angiosperms
- Clade: Eudicots
- Clade: Rosids
- Order: Myrtales
- Family: Lythraceae
- Subfamily: Lythroideae
- Genus: Lythrum; L.

Species
- See text

Synonyms
- Peplis L. Salicaria Mill.

= Lythrum =

Genus of flowering plants

Lythrum is a genus of 38 species of flowering plants native to the temperate world. Commonly known as loosestrife (a name they share with Lysimachia, which are not closely related), they are among 32 genera of the family Lythraceae.

== Description ==
They are herbaceous annuals or perennials. Typically they have square stems, narrow stalkless leaves, and spikes of star-shaped flowers in shades of purple, pink and white. They are especially associated with boggy areas, river banks and ponds, though in cultivation they often tolerate drier conditions. The species L. salicaria (purple loosestrife) and L. virgatum are found in cultivation.

== Selected species ==
Species include:

- Lythrum alatum Pursh – winged lythrum
- Lythrum anceps (Koehne) Makino – misohagi (Japan)
- Lythrum californicum Torr. & A.Gray – California loosestrife
- Lythrum curtissii Fernald – Curtiss' loosestrife
- Lythrum flagellare Shuttlw. ex Chapm. – Florida loosestrife
- Lythrum hyssopifolia L. – hyssop loosestrife, grass-poly
- Lythrum junceum Banks & Sol. – false grass-poly
- Lythrum lineare L. – wand lythrum
- Lythrum maritimum Kunth – pūkāmole (Peru, Hawaii)
- Lythrum ovalifolium Koehne – low loosestrife
- Lythrum paradoxum Koehne
- Lythrum portula (L.) D.A.Webb – spatulaleaf loosestrife, water purslane
- Lythrum salicaria L. – purple loosestrife
- Lythrum thymifolia L. – thymeleaf loosestrife
- Lythrum tribracteatum Salzm. ex Spreng. – threebract loosestrife
- Lythrum virgatum L. – European wand loosestrife
- Lythrum wilsonii Hewson – Wilson's loosestrife

=== Formerly placed here ===
- Cuphea carthagenensis (Jacq.) J.F.Macbr. (as L. carthagenense Jacq.)
- Cuphea melanium (L.) R.Br. ex Steud. (as L. melanium L.)
- Cuphea parsonsia (L.) R.Br. ex Steud. (as L. parsonsia L.)
- Cuphea racemosa subsp. racemosa (as L. racemosum L.f.)
- Cuphea viscosissima Jacq. (as L. petiolatum L.)
- Pleurophora anomala (A. St.-Hil.) Koehne (as L. anomalum A.St.-Hil.)
- Woodfordia fruticosa (L.) Kurz (as L. fruticosum L.)

== Morphology ==
Some species of Lythrum are heterostylous, such as the tristylous (occurring in three forms) L. salicaria.

== Ecology ==
Lythrum species are used as food plants by the larvae of some Lepidoptera species, including the small emperor moth, the engrailed, the Hebrew character, and the V-pug.

== As a noxious weed in the United States ==
The genus Lythrum is listed as a noxious weed in Michigan, North Carolina, and Wisconsin.

== Fossil record ==
So far the oldest evidence of Lythrum is fossil pollen from the early Campanian, 82–81 Ma of Wyoming.
