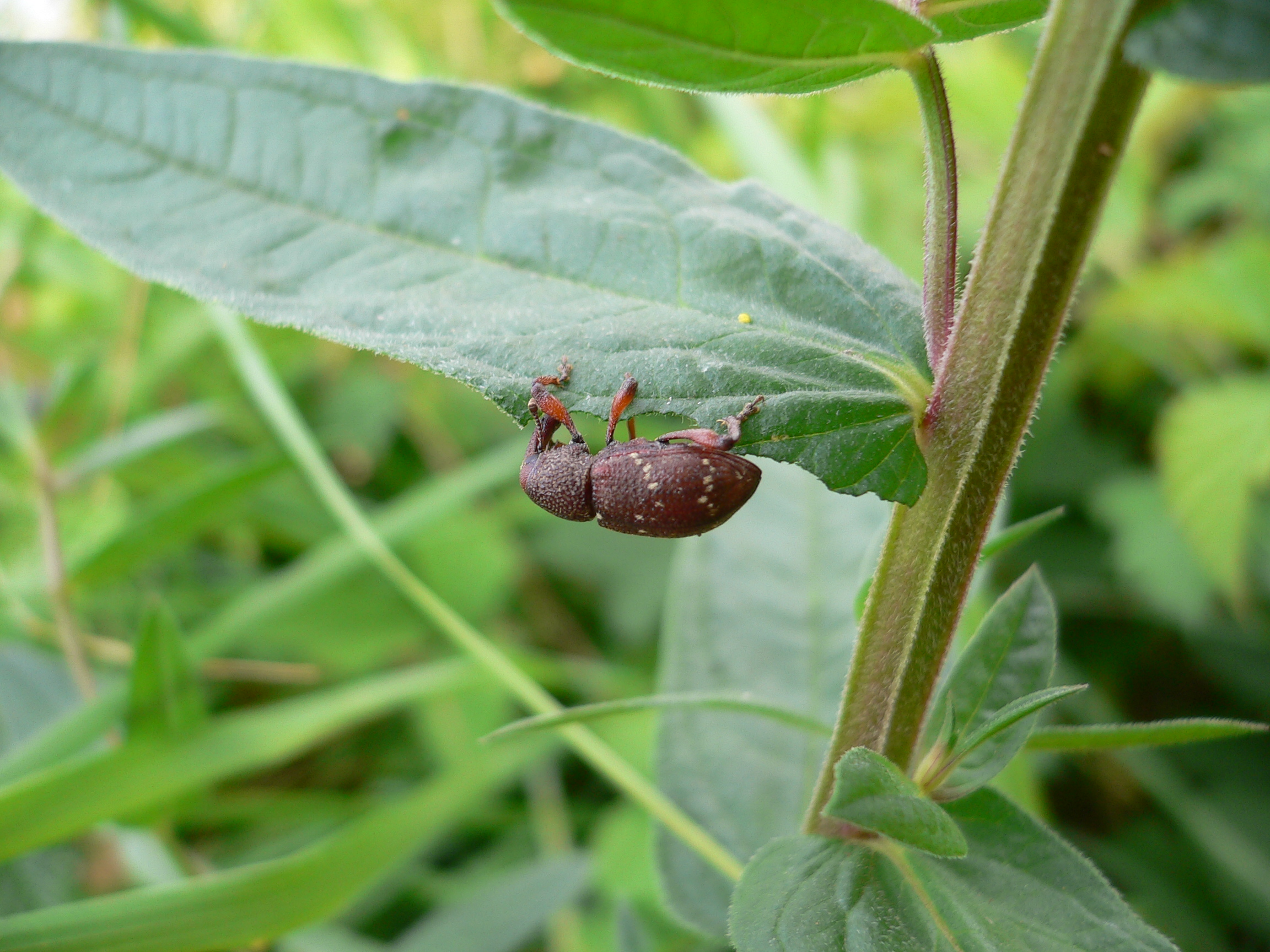
- H. transversovittatus on purple loosestrife

Scientific classification
- Kingdom: Animalia
- Phylum: Arthropoda
- Clade: Pancrustacea
- Class: Insecta
- Order: Coleoptera
- Suborder: Polyphaga
- Infraorder: Cucujiformia
- Superfamily: Curculionoidea
- Family: Curculionidae
- Genus: Hylobius
- Species: H. transversovittatus

Binomial name
- Hylobius transversovittatus (Goeze, 1777)

Synonyms
- Curculio transverso-vittatus Goeze, J.A.E., 1777

= Hylobius transversovittatus =

Species of beetle

Hylobius transversovittatus is a species of weevil in the family Curculionidae. It is native to the Old World where both adults and larvae feed on purple loosestrife (Lythrum salicaria). This plant is regarded as an invasive species in North America and the weevil has been introduced into both the United States and Canada in an effort to control the plant.

== Description ==
The adult Hylobius transversovittatus is a dark brown colour with two irregular transverse lines of tufts of white hair. It is about thirteen millimetres long and six millimetres wide and has a narrow head and thorax and a curved trunk-like proboscis. The antennae are elbowed and the legs reddish. The eggs are white or pale yellow and oval in shape and hatch within about two weeks. The larvae are a creamy colour with dark brown heads and adopt a crescent shape.

== Biology ==
Adult Hylobius transversovittatus beetles emerge in the spring from the soil or leaf litter where they have been overwintering. They feed on the leaves of purple loosestrife (Lythrum salicaria) and are mostly nocturnal. Their presence is evidenced by the ragged edges to leaves caused by their chewing. They are most active from June to August and may live for several years. The females lay about 200 eggs over a period of two to three months with each being deposited singly near the roots of purple loosestrife or occasionally on the stem. On hatching, the soil-laid larvae feed on root hairs before burrowing their way into the root where they feed on tissue within the woody rootstock. Stem-laid larvae tunnel into the stem and work their way down to the root. Larval development may be interrupted by periods of flooding and resume when the water level falls. The larvae undergo two moults over a period of one to two years before forming pupation chambers in the upper part of the root. They then moult again and become pupae. When metamorphosis is complete, the adult beetles chew their way out, usually emerging between July and October. The weevils can overwinter in any of their life stages, as eggs, larvae, pupae or adults.

== Host species ==
Hylobius transversovittatus seems to be host-specific to purple loosestrife (Lythrum salicaria). Before it was introduced into North America the weevil was tested on about fifty plants native to the continent to see whether they were susceptible to attack. Of these, only swamp loosestrife (Decodon verticillatus) and winged loosestrife (Lythrum alatum) were found to be potential hosts. It was found however that if purple loosestrife was available, it was preferred over these native species and the weevil was considered not to be a threat to non-target plants.

== Use in biological control ==
Purple loosestrife is a native of Europe, Asia, northwest Africa and parts of Australia. In these countries a number of insects are associated with it. These include Hylobius transversovittatus, the adults of which eat the foliage and the larvae of which tunnel through and eat the root. When purple loosestrife was introduced into North America these insects were not available to keep it under control and it became rampant. It is now found in large stands throughout the northeastern United States, southeastern Canada and the American Midwest where it crowds out other species and is a threat to biodiversity.

The weevils and their eggs were introduced to test sites in Virginia from 1992 onwards. They became successfully established and six years after the introduction, 28% of the roots of purple loosestrife plants were found to be infested. Larvae were also detected in roots four hundred metres downstream from the release point. Although the feeding of the adult weevils does little damage to the plant, the activities of the larvae, especially if there are several in one rootstock, weaken the plant, make it more susceptible to stressful conditions and reduce the quantity of seed produced.

Weevil eggs were imported from USA into New Zealand in 2025 and released for the first time in 2026 for the purpose of controlling purple loosestrife. Establishment is yet to be confirmed and further releases of laboratory reared weevils is planned from spring 2026 onwards.
