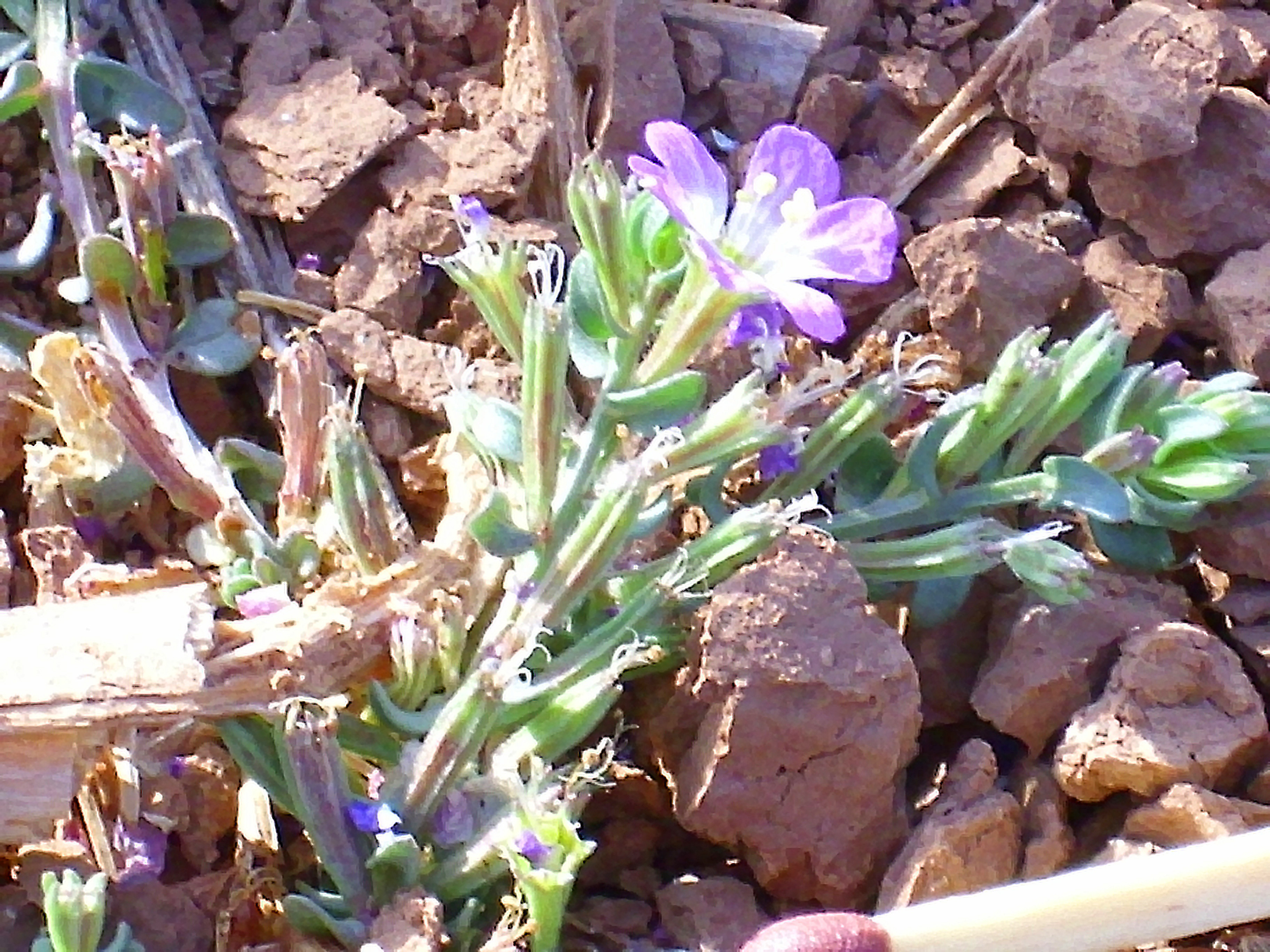

Scientific classification
- Kingdom: Plantae
- Clade: Tracheophytes
- Clade: Angiosperms
- Clade: Eudicots
- Clade: Rosids
- Order: Myrtales
- Family: Lythraceae
- Genus: Lythrum
- Species: L. tribracteatum

Binomial name
- Lythrum tribracteatum Salzm. ex Spreng.

= Lythrum tribracteatum =

Species of flowering plant

Lythrum tribracteatum is a species of flowering plant in the loosestrife family known by the common name threebract loosestrife.

It is native to Europe, and it is found in parts of western North America as an introduced species. It often grows in moist habitat, such as ponds. This is an erect, branching annual herb growing up to about 30 centimeters in maximum height. The oblong leaves are up to 2.5 centimeters long and arranged oppositely on the lower stem, and alternately on the upper. Clusters of small flowers grow in the leaf axils, each with glandular bright red sepals and tiny lavender petals.
