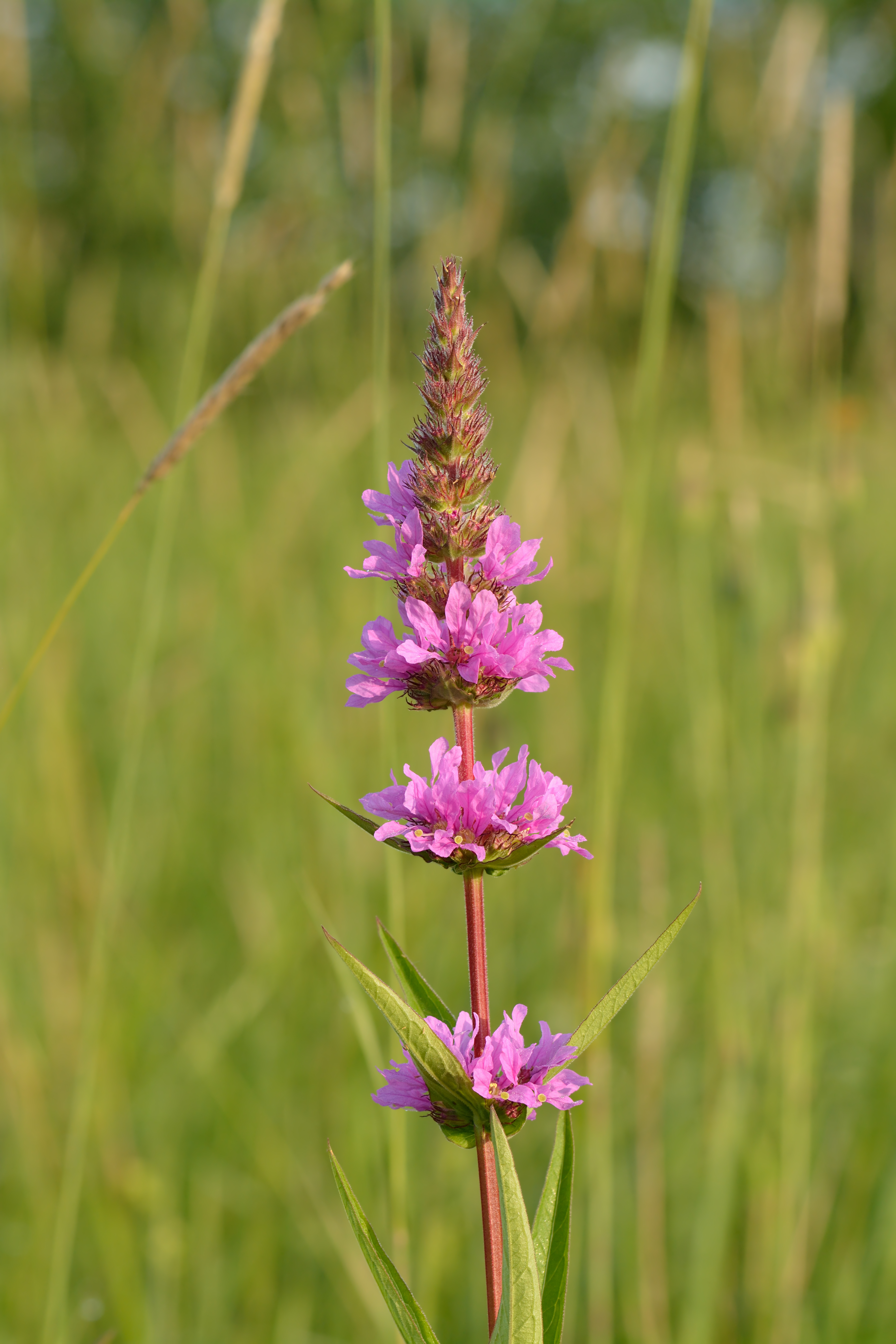
- Meadow in Illurma village, Northwestern Estonia

Conservation status
- Least Concern (IUCN 3.1)

Scientific classification
- Kingdom: Plantae
- Clade: Tracheophytes
- Clade: Angiosperms
- Clade: Eudicots
- Clade: Rosids
- Order: Myrtales
- Family: Lythraceae
- Genus: Lythrum
- Species: L. salicaria

Binomial name
- Lythrum salicaria L.

Synonyms
- List: Chabraea vulgaris Bubani; Lythron salicarium St.-Lag.; Lythrum alternifolium Lorey; Lythrum altissimum Pomel; Lythrum anceps (Koehne) Makino; Lythrum argyi H.Lév.; Lythrum cashmerianum Royle; Lythrum cinereum Griseb.; Lythrum coronense Schur; Lythrum diffusum Sweet; Lythrum dubium Schult.; Lythrum gracile (DC.) DC. ex Lafont; Lythrum hexagonum Bercht. ex Opiz; Lythrum nummulariifolium Pers.; Lythrum palustre Salisb.; Lythrum propinquum Weinm.; Lythrum pubescens Sweet; Lythrum purshianum Steud.; Lythrum quadrifolium Mart.; Lythrum salicarium St.-Lag.; Lythrum spicatum Gray; Lythrum spicatum var. verticillatum Svanlund; Lythrum spiciforme Dulac; Lythrum tomentosum Mill.; Salicaria spicata Lam.; Salicaria vulgaris Moench

= Lythrum salicaria =

Species of flowering plant

Lythrum salicaria or purple loosestrife is a flowering plant belonging to the family Lythraceae. It should not be confused with other plants sharing the name loosestrife that are members of the genus Lysimachia in the family Primulaceae. This herbaceous perennial plant is native to temperate regions of Europe, Asia, northern Africa, and eastern Australia.

== Etymology and other names ==
The generic name Lythrum is derived from the Greek 'lythron', meaning blood, in reference to the flower colour in some species. The specific epithet salicaria probably derives from the similarity of the leaves to those of willows or Salix species, though Linnaeus did not specify this in his choice of the name.

The English calque 'loosestrife' first appeared in written form in the 16th century. It was coined by English naturalist William Turner in his 1548 work A New Herball, in which he states: "Lycimachia purpurea, … may in englishe be called red loosstryfe or purple losestryfe". (Note: Turner treated this species and yellow loosestrife (now Lysimachia vulgaris) in the same genus Lycimachia [sic])

Purple-loosestrife was referred to several times as 'long purples' by John Clare, such as in his 1821 poem The Wildflower Nosegay:

"Where on the water op'd the lily buds

And fine long purples shadow'd in the lake..."

— Volume II of The Village Minstrel and Other Poems, John Clare, pg. 133

== Description ==
Lythrum salicaria can grow 1–2 m (3 ft 3 in – 6 ft 7 in) tall, forming extensive clonal colonies, with numerous erect stems growing from a single woody root mass. The stems are reddish-purple and square in cross-section. The leaves are lanceolate, 3–10 centimetres (1–4 in) long and 5–15 millimetres (3/16–9/16 in) broad, downy and sessile, and arranged opposite or in whorls of three.

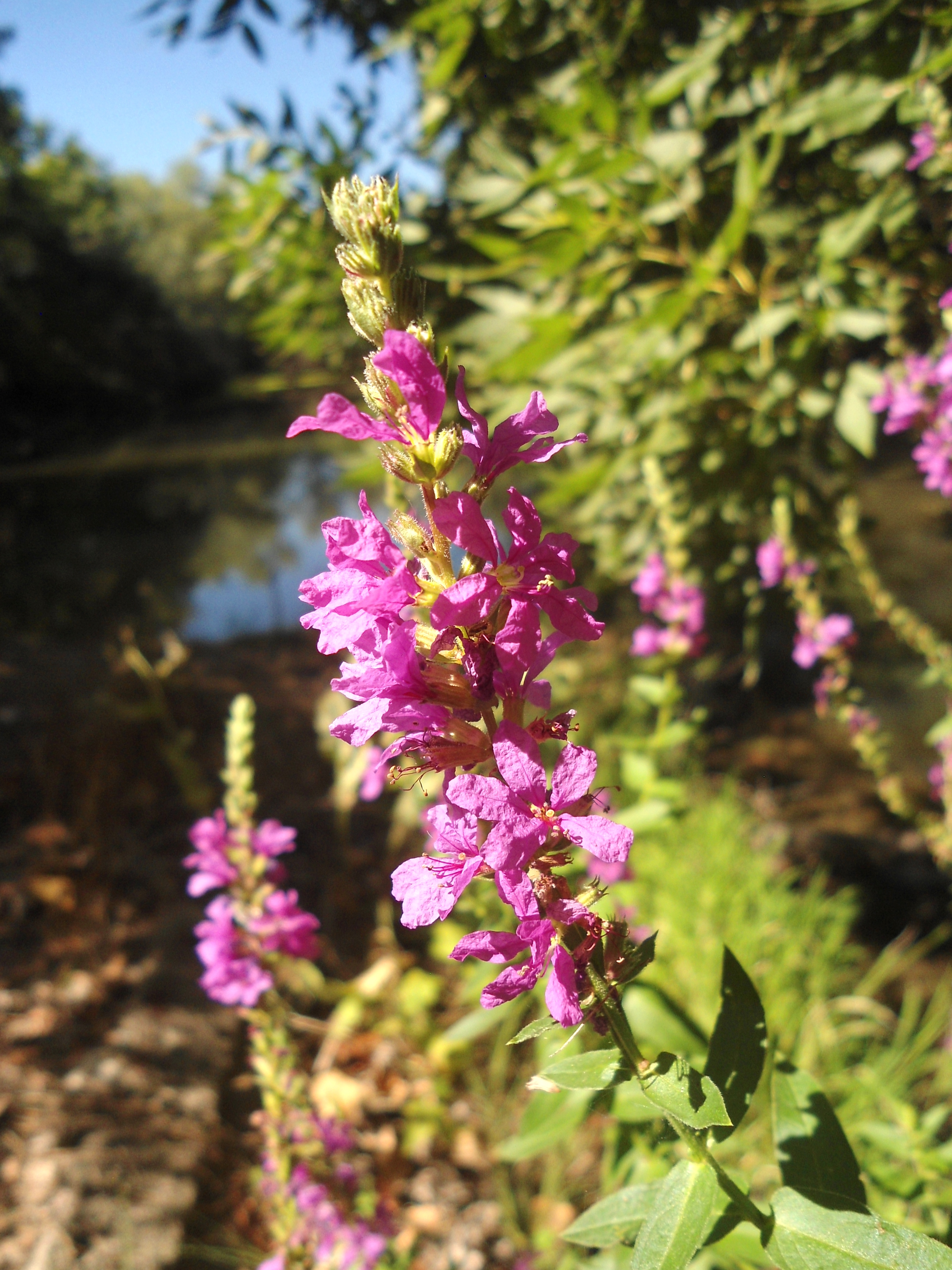
L. salicaria flowers

The flowers are reddish purple, 10–20 millimetres (1/2–3/4 in) in diameter, with six petals (occasionally five) and 12 stamens, and are clustered tightly in verticillasters in the axils of bracts or leaves. There are three different flower types, with the stamens and style of different lengths, short, medium or long; each flower type can only be pollinated by one of the other types, not the same type, thus ensuring cross-pollination between different plants. For instance, if the pistil is medium length, then the stamens will be long and short, but not medium. The flowers are visited by many types of insects, and can be characterised by a generalised pollination syndrome.

The fruit is a small 3–4 millimetres (1/8–5/32 in) capsule containing numerous minute seeds. Flowering lasts throughout the summer. When the seeds are mature, the leaves often turn bright red through dehydration in early autumn; the red autumn colour may last for almost two weeks. The dead stalks from previous growing seasons are brown.

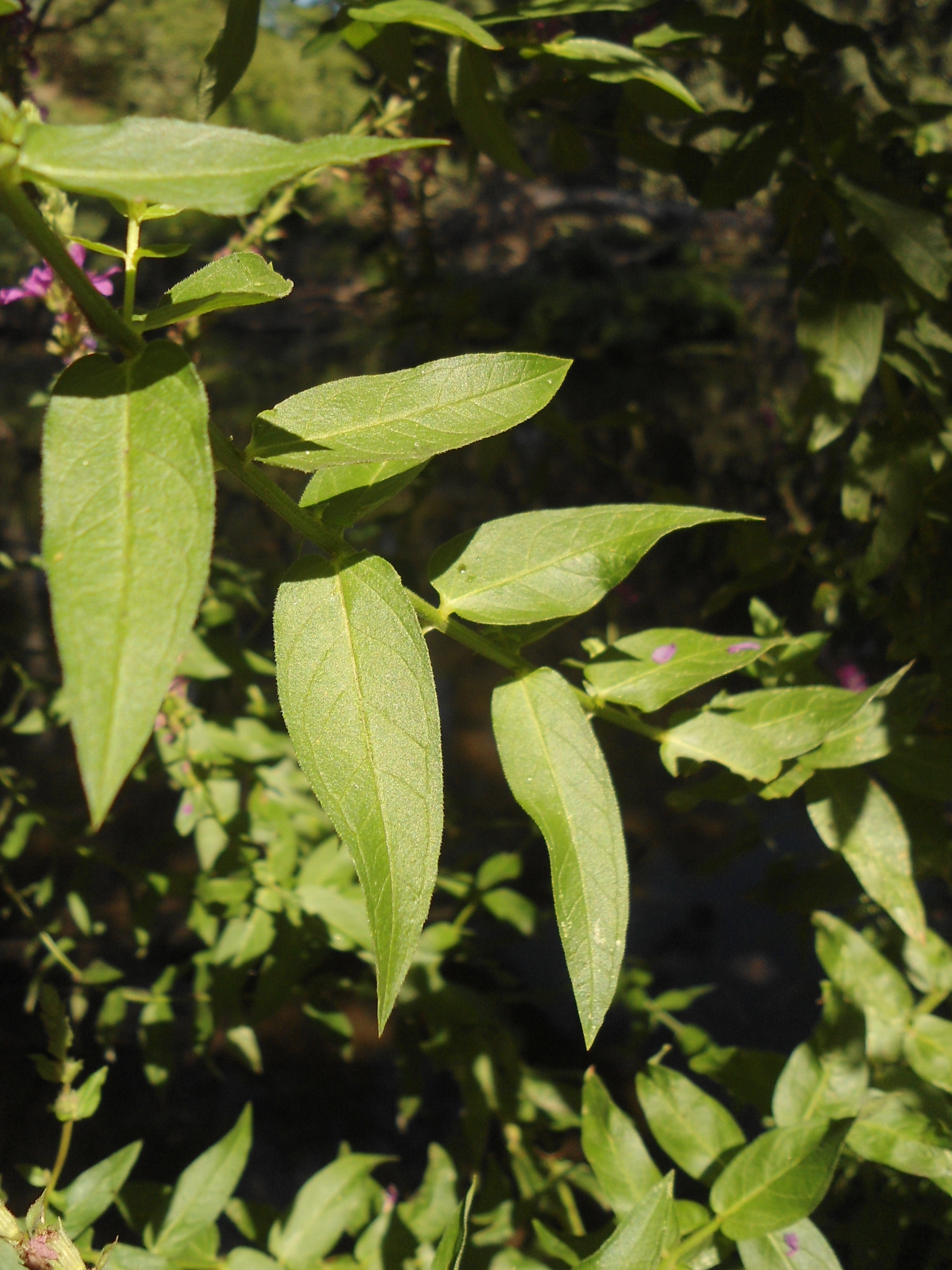
L. salicaria leaves

L. salicaria is very variable in leaf shape and degree of hairiness, and a number of subspecies and varieties have been described, but it is now generally regarded as monotypic with none of these variants being considered of botanical significance. The species Lythrum intermedium Ledeb. ex Colla has often been considered synonymous in the past, but is now treated as a separate species, from Central Asia, by the Plants of the World Online database.

== Distribution ==
Lythrum salicaria is native to Europe, temperate Asia, northern Africa, and Australia. It is also naturalised in many temperate parts of the world, including parts of southern Africa, North America, and South America. The species was thought to be a recent introduction to Australia, but pre-colonial pollen samples have been found in New South Wales, indicating natural colonisation before modern human plant introductions; the question is considered unresolved by Australian authorities.

== Ecology ==
Found in ditches, wet meadows and marshes and along sides of lakes. In North America, purple-loosestrife can invade sedge meadows.

== Associated insects ==
The flowers are pollinated by long-tongued insects, including bees and butterflies.

A number of insects use Lythrum salicaria as a food resource.

The black-margined loosestrife beetle Galerucella calmariensis is a brown beetle with a black line on its thorax. The adult feeds on the leaves of the plant, producing characteristic round holes. Its larvae destroy tender leaf buds and strip the tissue from the leaves. The golden loosestrife beetle Galerucella pusilla is nearly identical to G. calmariensis, but usually lacks the black thoracic line. Its feeding habits are also quite similar to the other leaf beetle.

The loosestrife root weevil Hylobius transversovittatus is a large red nocturnal weevil, which spends its nights feeding on leaves and leaf buds. The larvae emerge from their eggs and immediately burrow into the root of the plant, which they feed on continuously for over a year. This root damage stunts the plant's growth and ability to create seeds. If several larvae inhabit the same root, the plant can be killed.

The loosestrife flower weevil Nanophyes marmoratus is a tiny weevil which lays a single egg in each flower. When the larvae emerge they eat the flowers' ovaries, and the plant is unable to create seeds. The larvae usually proceed to hollow out the flower buds and use them as safe places to pupate.

Caterpillars of the engrailed moth (Ectropis crepuscularia), a polyphagous geometer moth, also feed on purple-loosestrife.

== Cultivation, uses and impact ==
It has been used as an astringent medicinal herb to treat diarrhea and dysentery; it is considered safe to use for all ages, including babies. It is also cultivated as an ornamental plant in gardens, and is particularly associated with damp, poorly drained locations such as marshes, bogs and watersides. However, it will tolerate drier conditions. The flowers are showy and bright, and a number of cultivars have been selected for variation in flower colour, including:

- 'Atropurpureum' with dark purple flowers
- 'Brightness' with deep pink flowers
- 'Happy' with red flowers on a short (60 cm or 24 in) stem
- 'Purple Spires' with purple flowers on a tall stem
- 'Roseum Superbum' with large pink flowers.

The cultivars 'Blush' with blush-pink flowers, and 'Feuerkerze' with rose-red flowers have gained the Royal Horticultural Society's Award of Garden Merit.

It has also been introduced in many areas of North America by bee keepers, due to its abundance of flowers which provide an important source of nectar.

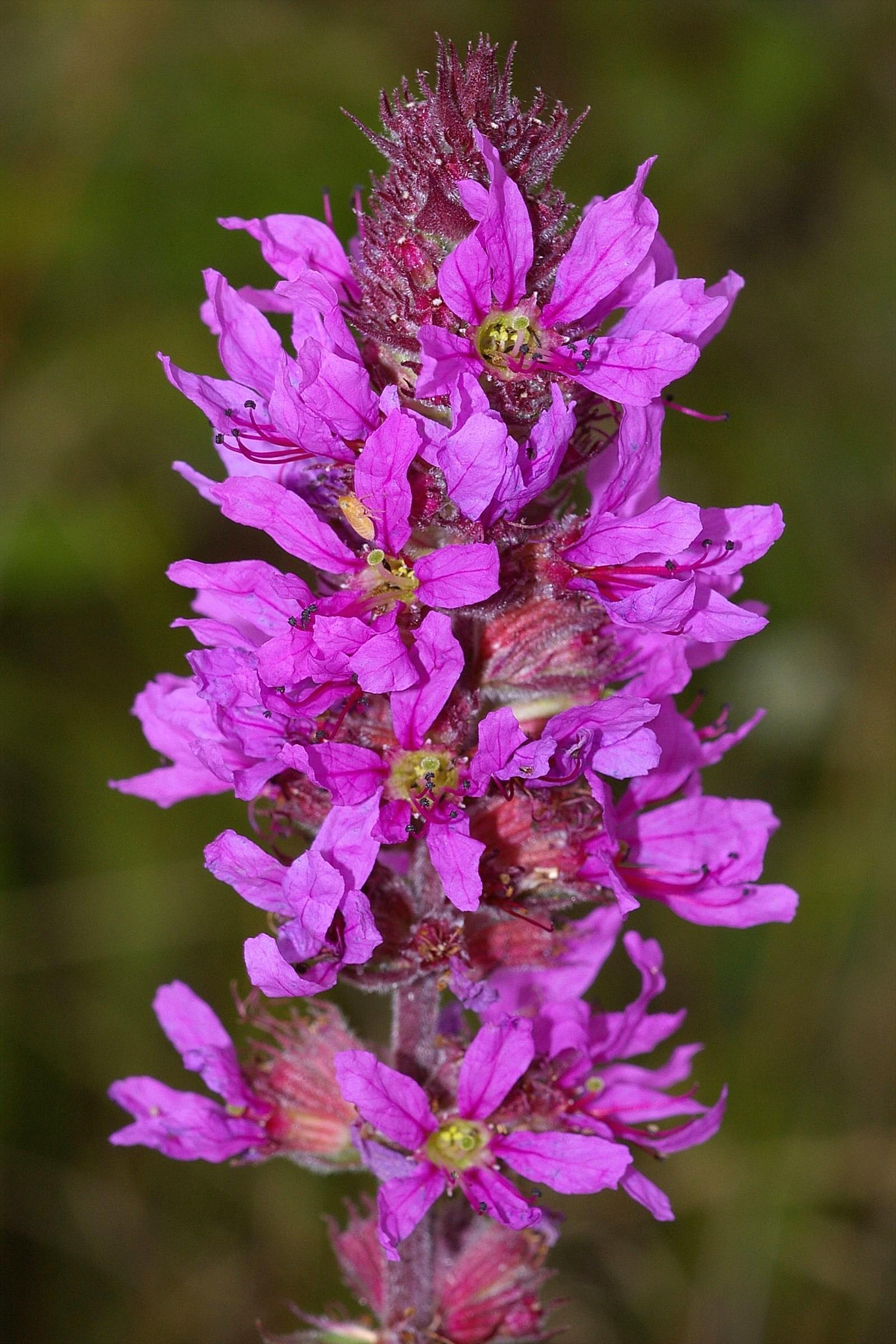
Flowers in Lower Saxony, Germany

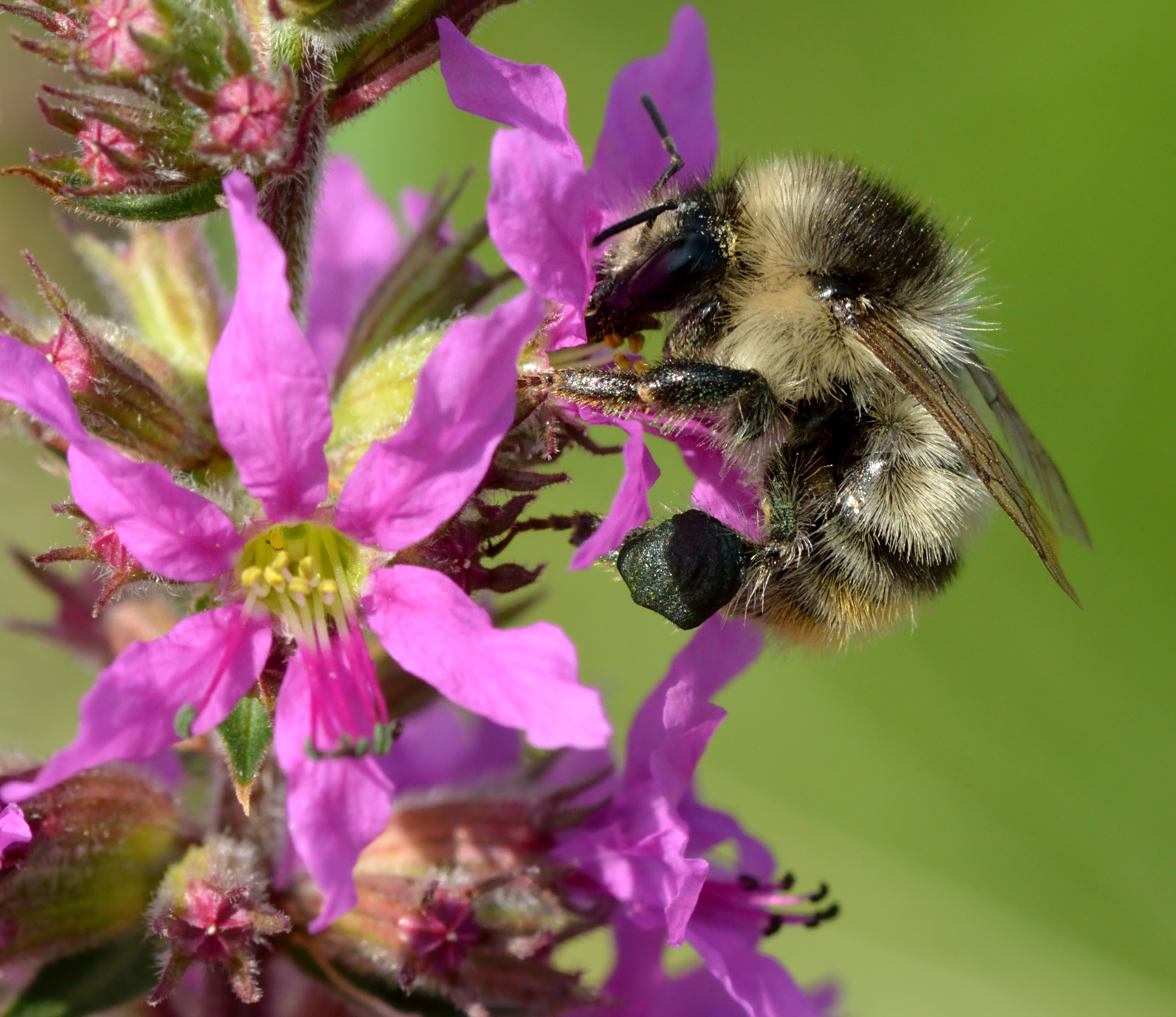
Pollinating shrill carder bee, Keila, Northwestern Estonia

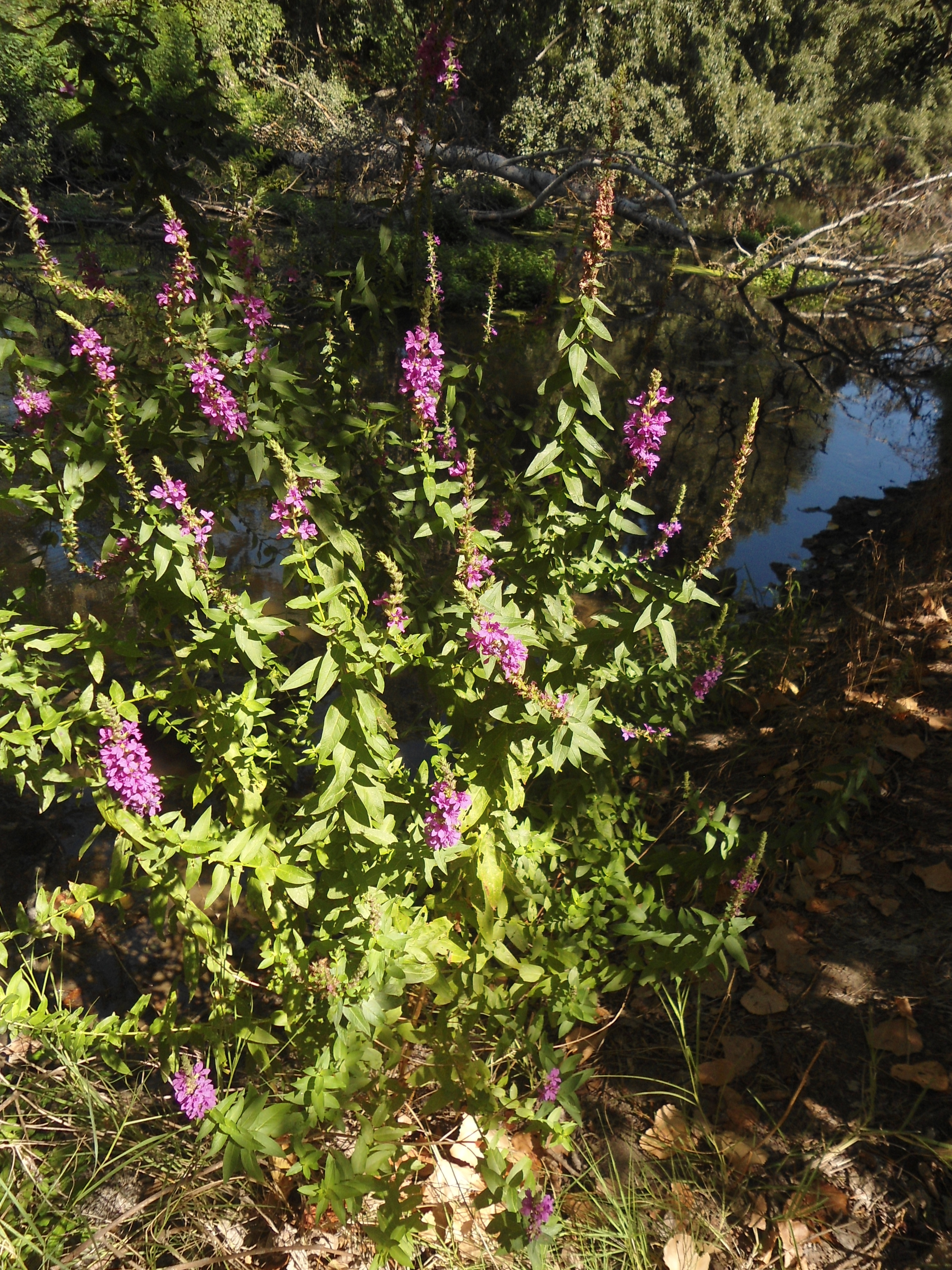
Habit in Bulgaria

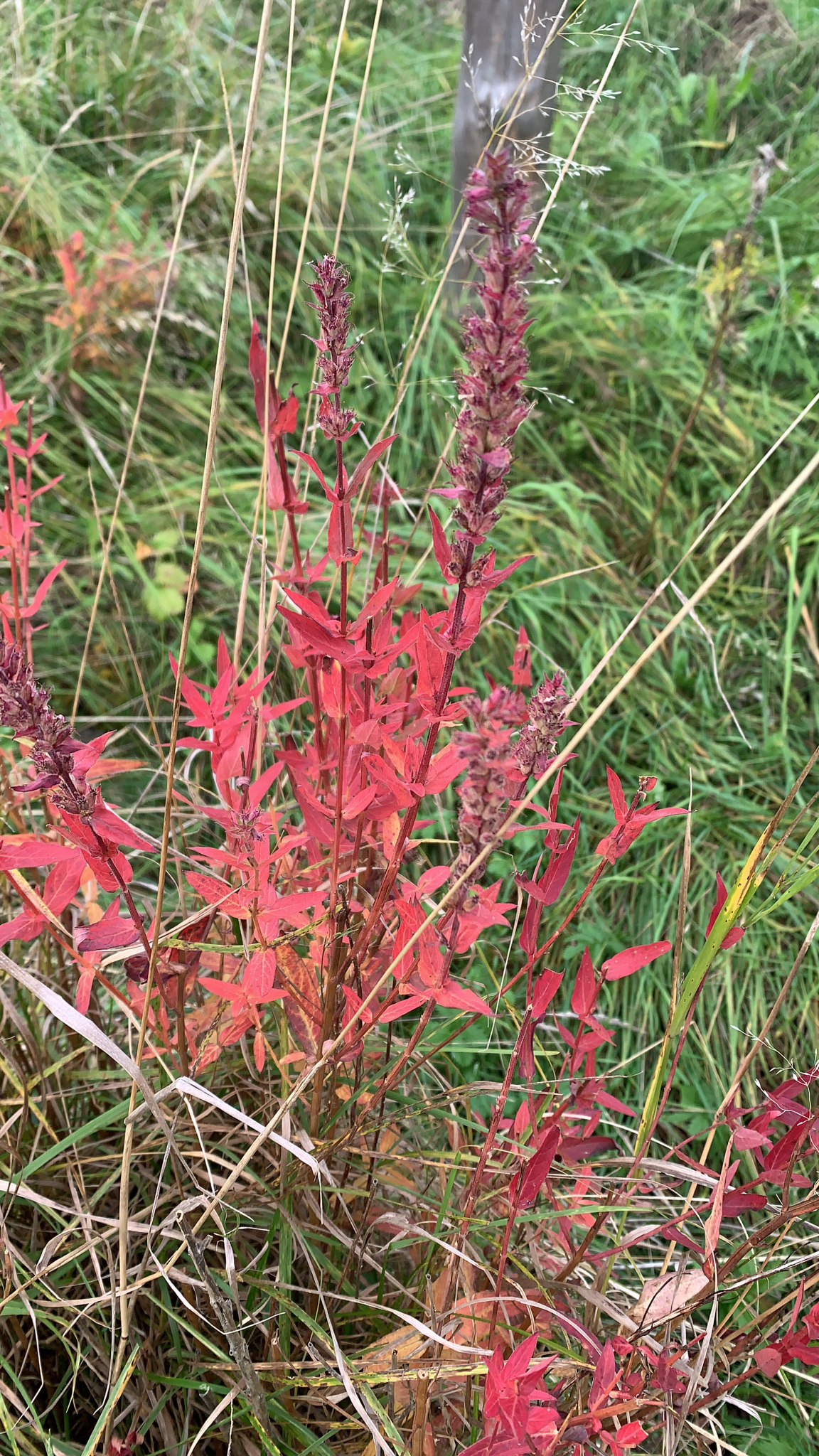
Bright crimson leaves at the onset of autumn, Velké Chvojno, Czech Republic

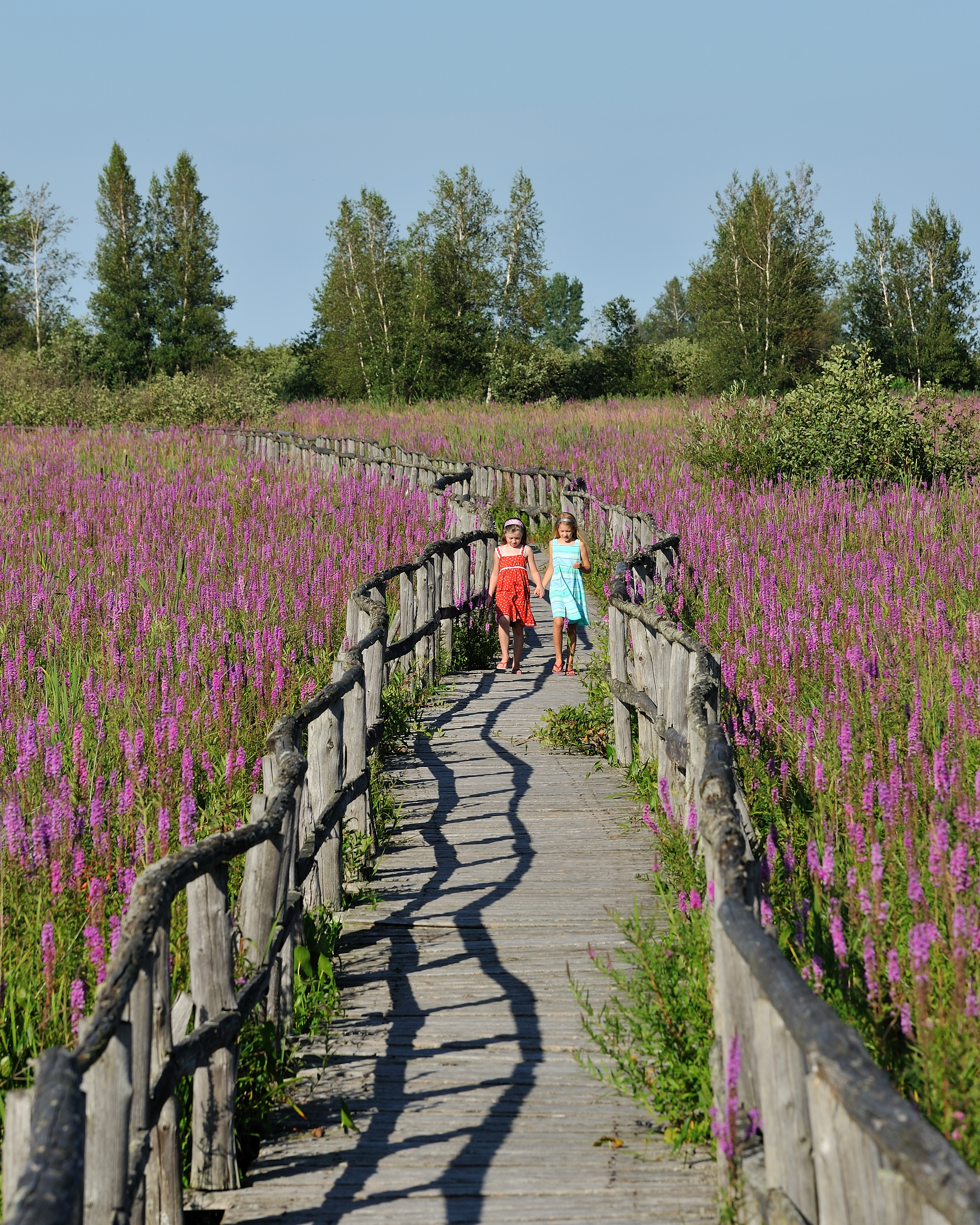
Naturalised in the Cooper Marsh Conservation Area, near Cornwall, Ontario

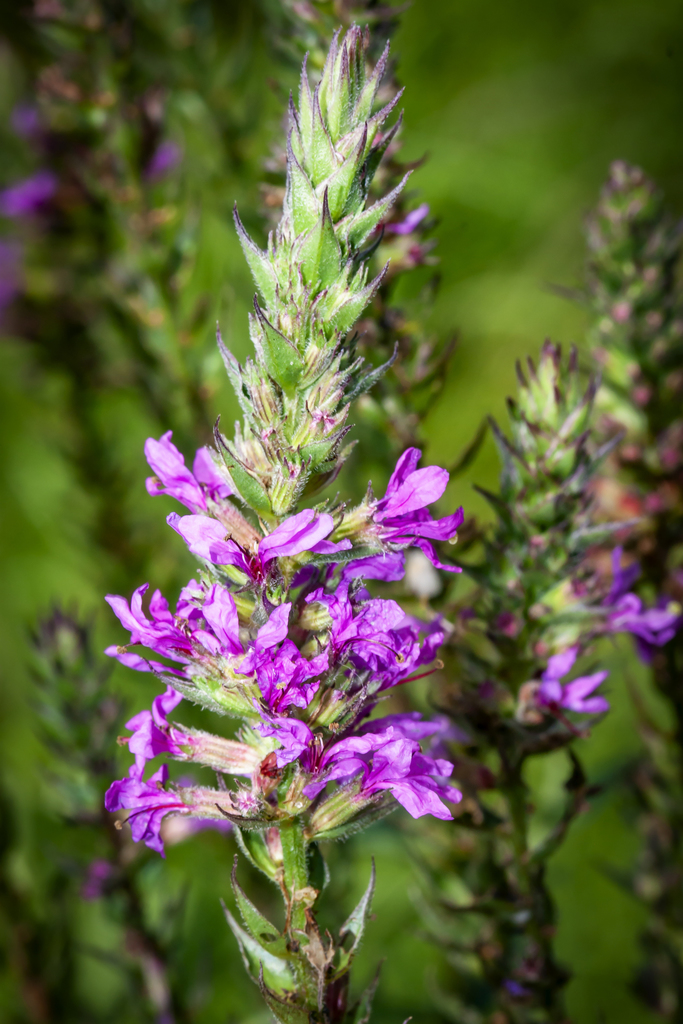
Naturalised in Pennsylvania

=== As an invasive species ===
Purple-loosestrife has been introduced into temperate New Zealand and North America where it is now widely naturalised (spreading on its own) and officially listed in some controlling agents. Infestations may rarely result in dramatic disruption in water flow in rivers and canals, and the life cycles of organisms from waterfowl to amphibians to algae being affected.

A single plant may produce up to 2.7 million tiny seeds annually. Easily carried by wind and water, the seeds germinate in moist soils after overwintering. The plant can also sprout anew from pieces of root left in the soil or water. Once established, loosestrife stands are difficult and costly to remove by mechanical and chemical means.

However, research about how invasive plants are portrayed in media indicate that the threat from loosestrife and other infamous invasive plants is driven more by media attention than science. While the species does have negative impacts on the natural environment the scientific literature supports a much more modest assessment of how bad it is outside its native range and that resources would be better spent on preventing disturbance of wetlands than on the removal of purple-loosestrife.

Plants marketed under the name "European wand loosestrife" (L. virgatum) are the same species despite the different name. In some cases the plants sold are sterile.

In North America, purple-loosestrife may be distinguished from similar native plants (e.g., fireweed Chamerion angustifolium, blue vervain Verbena hastata, Liatris Liatris spp., and spiraea (Spiraea douglasii) by its angular stalks which are square in outline, as well as by its leaves, which are in pairs that alternate at right angle and are not serrated.

==== Biological control ====
Purple-loosestrife provides a model of successful biological pest control. Research began in 1985 and today the plant is managed well with a number of insects that feed on it. Five species of beetle use purple-loosestrife as their natural food source, and they can do significant damage to the plant. The beetles used as biological control agents include two species of leaf beetle: Galerucella calmariensis and Galerucella pusilla; and three species of weevil: Hylobius transversovittatus, Nanophyes breves, and Nanophyes marmoratus. Infestations of either of the Galerucella species is extremely effective in wiping out a stand of purple-loosestrife, defoliating up to 100% of the plants in an area. The moth Ectropis crepuscularia is polyphagous and a pest species itself, and unsuitable for biological control.
