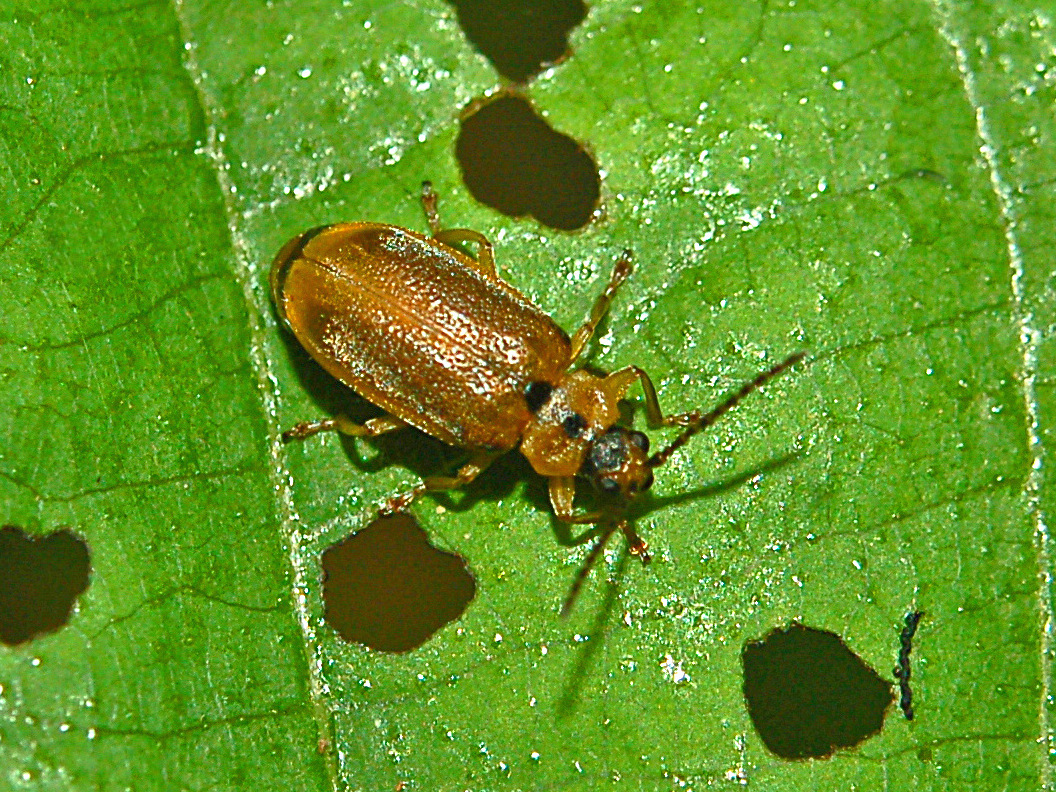

Scientific classification
- Kingdom: Animalia
- Phylum: Arthropoda
- Class: Insecta
- Order: Coleoptera
- Suborder: Polyphaga
- Infraorder: Cucujiformia
- Family: Chrysomelidae
- Genus: Galerucella
- Species: G. lineola

Binomial name
- Galerucella lineola (Fabricius, 1781)

Synonyms
- Adimonia verna Laicharting, 1781; Crioceris lineola Fabricius, 1781; Galeruca maculicornis Faldermann, 1837

= Galerucella lineola =

Species of beetle

Galerucella lineola is a species of leaf beetle in the family Chrysomelidae.

== Description ==
Galerucella lineola can reach a length of 4–5 millimetres (0.16–0.20 in). The body is almost cylindrical. The basic color is brownish-yellow with a darker spot on the pronotum and on the elytra. The antennae are black. It has a black underside. The legs are slightly lighter. The larvae are gray-white to brownish and resemble small caterpillars.

Food plants include Salix alba, Salix viminalis, Salix caprea, Salix pentandra, Salix cinerea, Salix myrsinifolia, Salix fragilis, Populus nigra, Corylus avellana, Alnus glutinosa, Betula pendula, and Alnus incana.

These beetles are considered by some a pest and can in some years do great damage to the foliage gnawing holes in the leaves.

== Distribution ==
This species is widespread in the Palearctic realm from Ireland to Japan, in the Near East, and in North Africa.

== Habitat ==
Galerucella lineola can be found along the banks of watercourses, ponds and lakes, from lowlands up to foothills.

== Subspecies ==
- Galerucella lineola lineola (Fabricius, 1781)
- Galerucella lineola solarii Burlini, 1942
