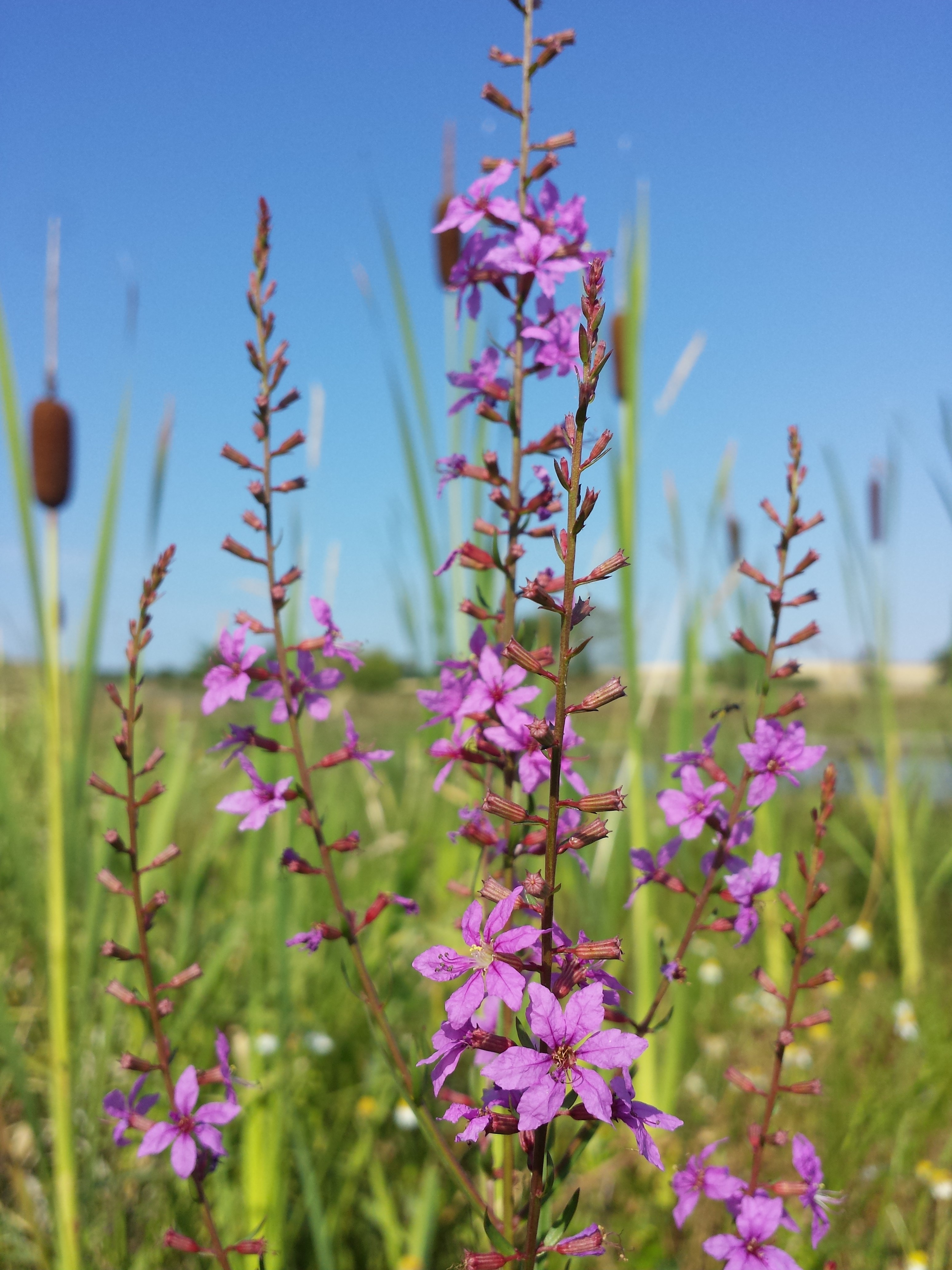
- Flower stalk
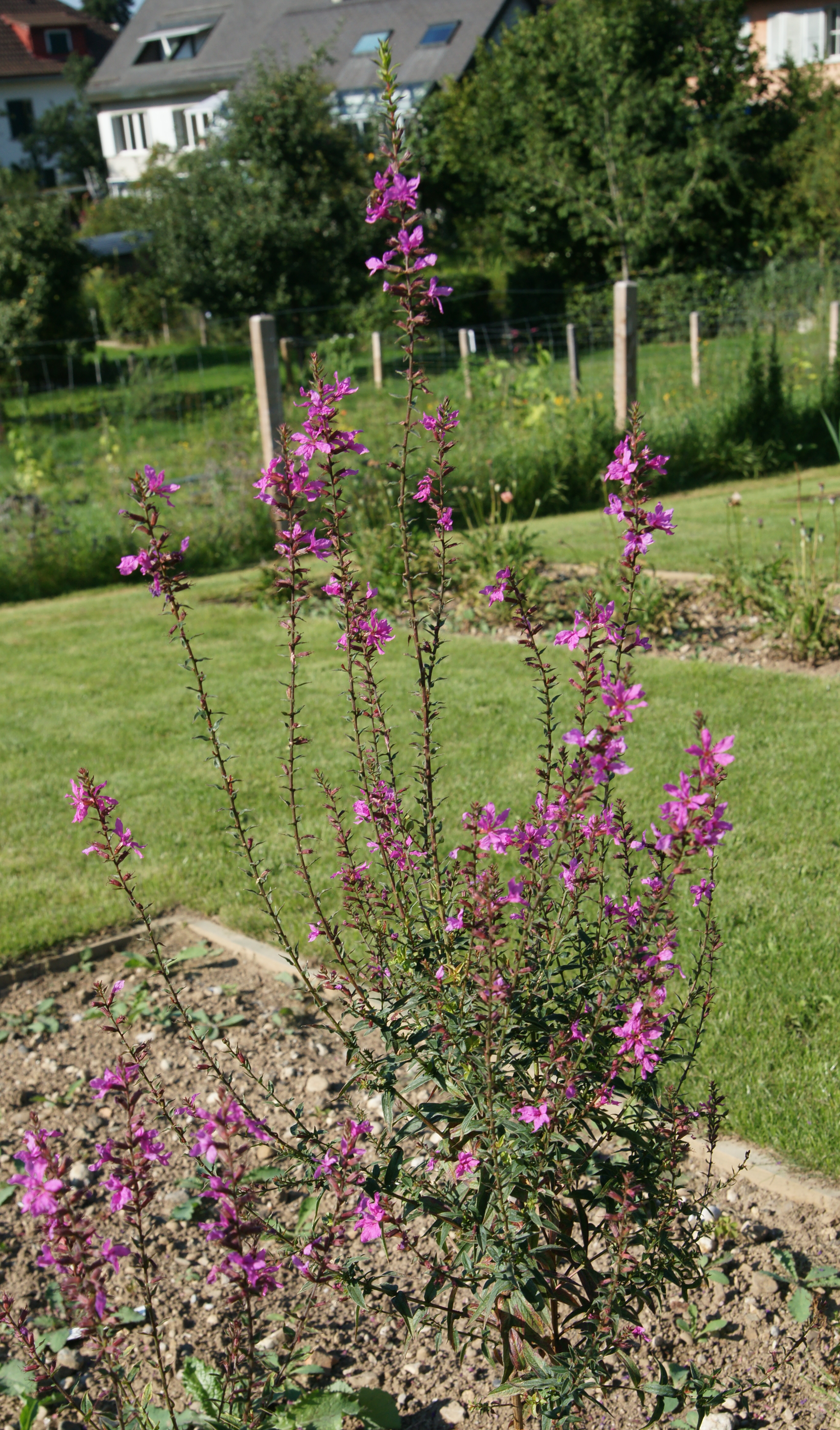
- 'Rose Queen' cultivar

Scientific classification
- Kingdom: Plantae
- Clade: Tracheophytes
- Clade: Angiosperms
- Clade: Eudicots
- Clade: Rosids
- Order: Myrtales
- Family: Lythraceae
- Genus: Lythrum
- Species: L. virgatum

Binomial name
- Lythrum virgatum L.

Synonyms
- List: Hexostemon virgatus (L.) Raf.; Lythrum acuminatum Willd.; Lythrum austriacum Jacq.; Lythrum divaricatum Schur; Lythrum elegans Schur; Lythrum lusitanicum Mill.; Lythrum roseum-superbum Abbey; Pythagorea virgata (L.) Raf.; Salicaria virgata (L.) Moench

= Lythrum virgatum =

Species of plant

Lythrum virgatum, the wand loosestrife, is a species of flowering plant in the family Lythraceae, native to wet areas of the Eurasian steppes, and introduced to France, Germany, and the United States. The unimproved species and a number of cultivars are available from commercial suppliers. It is considered an invasive species in some jurisdictions.

== Cultivars ==
- 'Dropmore Purple'
- 'Happiness'
- 'Hélène'
- 'Joy'
- pale-flowered
- 'Rose Queen'
- 'Rosy Gem'
- 'The Bride'
- 'The Rocket'
