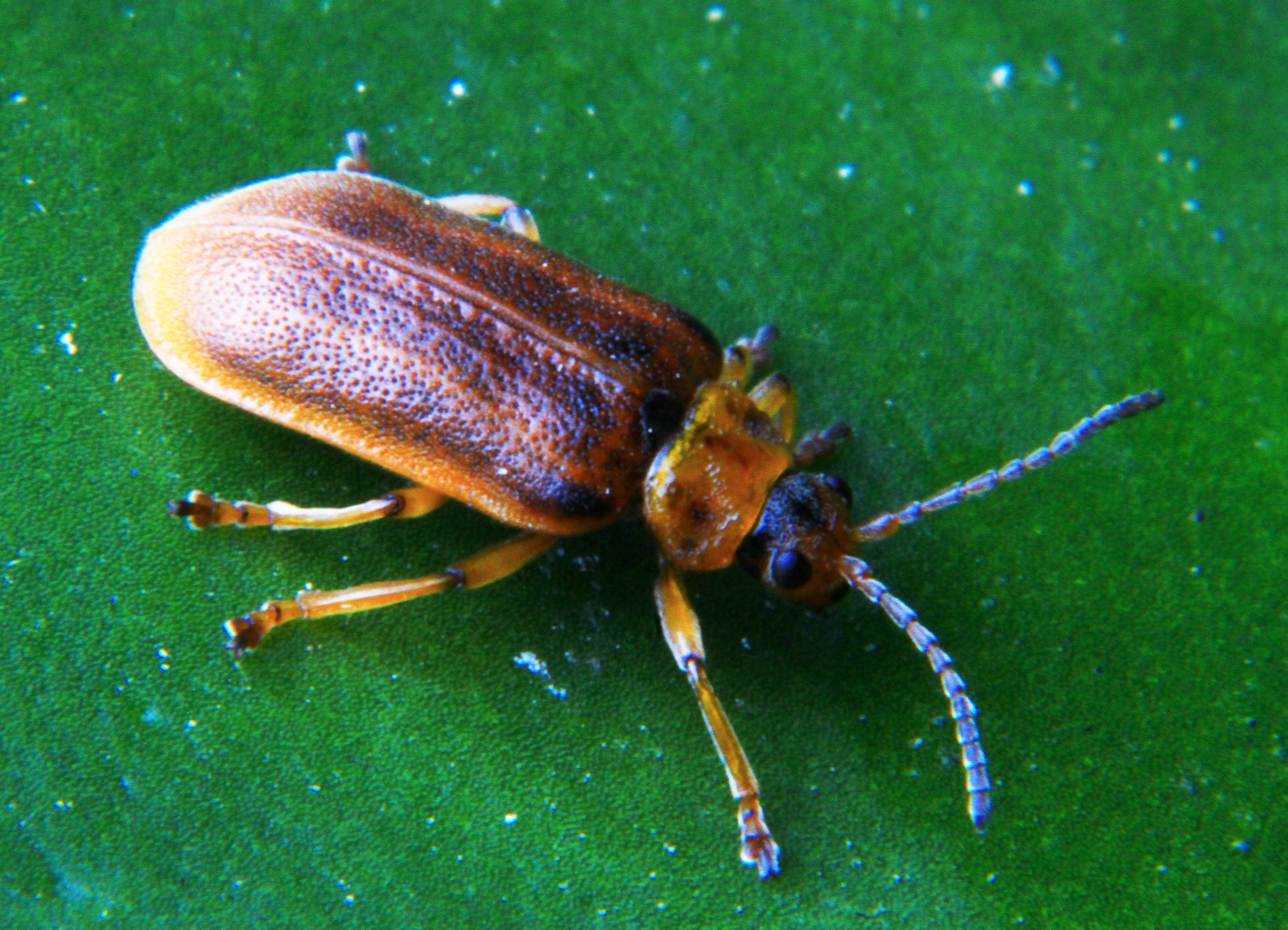

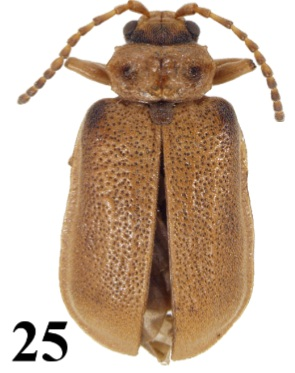

Scientific classification
- Kingdom: Animalia
- Phylum: Arthropoda
- Clade: Pancrustacea
- Class: Insecta
- Order: Coleoptera
- Suborder: Polyphaga
- Infraorder: Cucujiformia
- Family: Chrysomelidae
- Genus: Galerucella
- Species: G. nymphaeae

Binomial name
- Galerucella nymphaeae (Linnaeus, 1758)

Synonyms
- Chrysomela nymphaeae Linnaeus, 1758; Adimonia polygonata Laicharting, 1781; Galeruca aquatica Geoffroy in Fourcroy, 1785; Galleruca sagittariae Gyllenhal, 1813; Galleruca marginella Kirby, 1837; Galeruca femoralis F. E. Melsheimer, 1847; Galleruca luctuosa Mannerheim, 1852; Galerucella fergussoni Fowler, 1910; Galerucella nymphaeae var. stilleri Papp, 1943; Galerucella kerstensi Lohse, 1989

= Galerucella nymphaeae =

Species of beetle

Galerucella nymphaeae, known generally as the water-lily beetle or water lily leaf beetle, is a species of skeletonizing leaf beetle in the family Chrysomelidae. It is found in North America and Europe.

== Appearance ==
=== Adult ===
A 6–8 mm (0.24–0.31 in) elongated oval yellow-brown sleek-haired beetle with mottles on the wingtops. The feet and feelers are darker. The adults can over winter on shore and in typical central European environments have two generations a year, with the initial one closer to shore. In thermal lakes this can be increased to four generations a year with a single female producing in its lifetime 80 to 120 eggs.

=== Pupa ===
The orange-yellow pupa adhere to the surface of the water lily leaf for about a week.

=== Larvae ===
This stage lasts 5 to 10 days and they slough three times. Young larvae are black-green, and become initially light brown and once they reach 6–8 mm (0.24–0.31 in) with three foot-pairs have a chestnut-brown head capsule.

=== Eggs ===
Found as spherical reticulated opal-white bunches of 10 to 15 on stems and lily parts that emerge from the water surface.

== Pest ==
They are destructive to the ornamental appearance of water lilies with both adults and larva eating the plant whose damaged epidermis causes within days the leaf to become rotten and brown. Replacement leaves tend to be smaller and less attractive. Other water plants can be attacked as well.

=== Pest Control ===
Can be mechanical by removing the surface damaged water lilies to a nearby hard surface and heating under black plastic in the sun. In Europe a biological insecticide containing proteins from Bacillus thuringiensis subspecies tenebrionis is used.

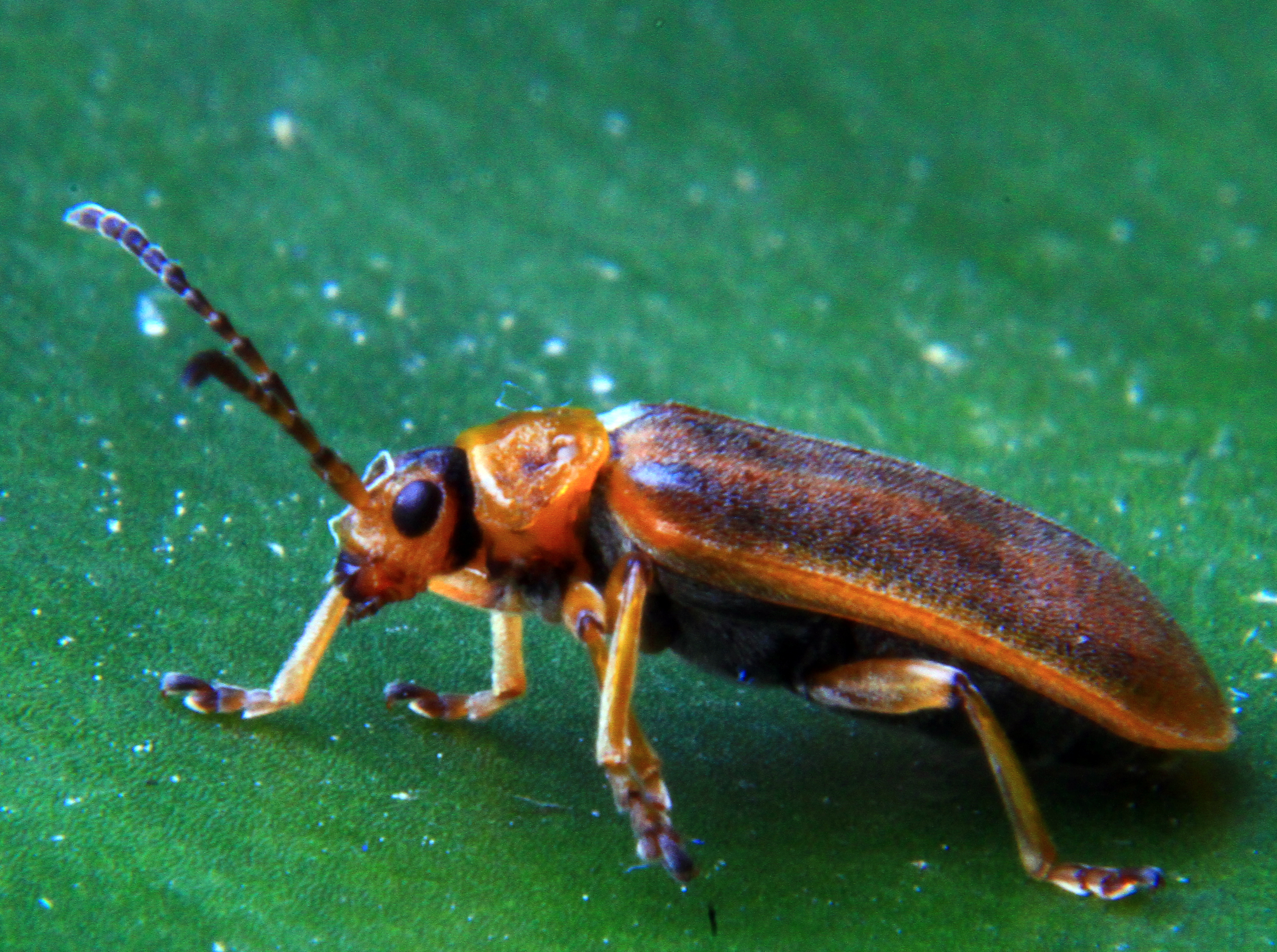
Water-lily beetle, Galerucella nymphaeae

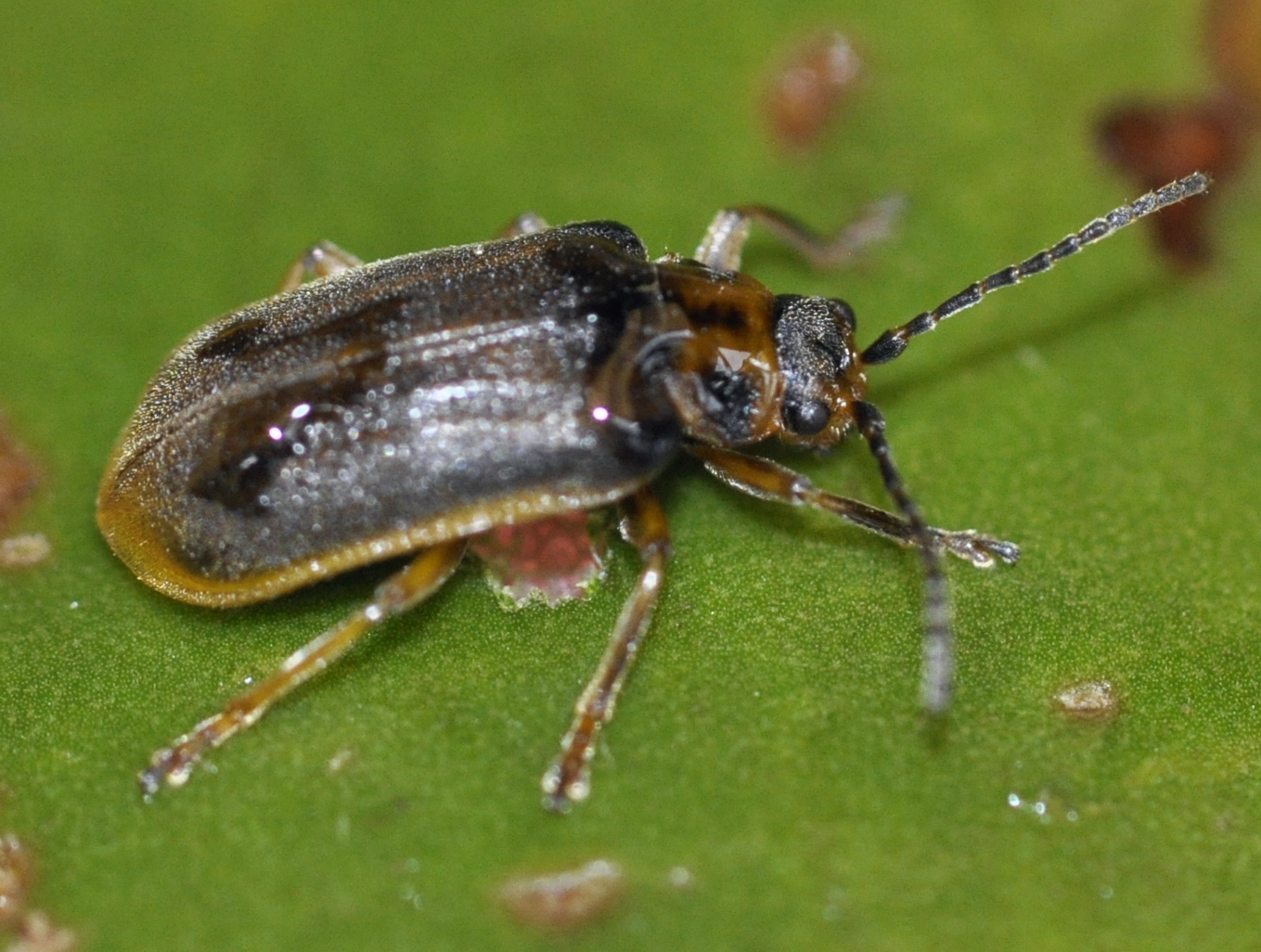
Water-lily beetle, Galerucella nymphaeae
