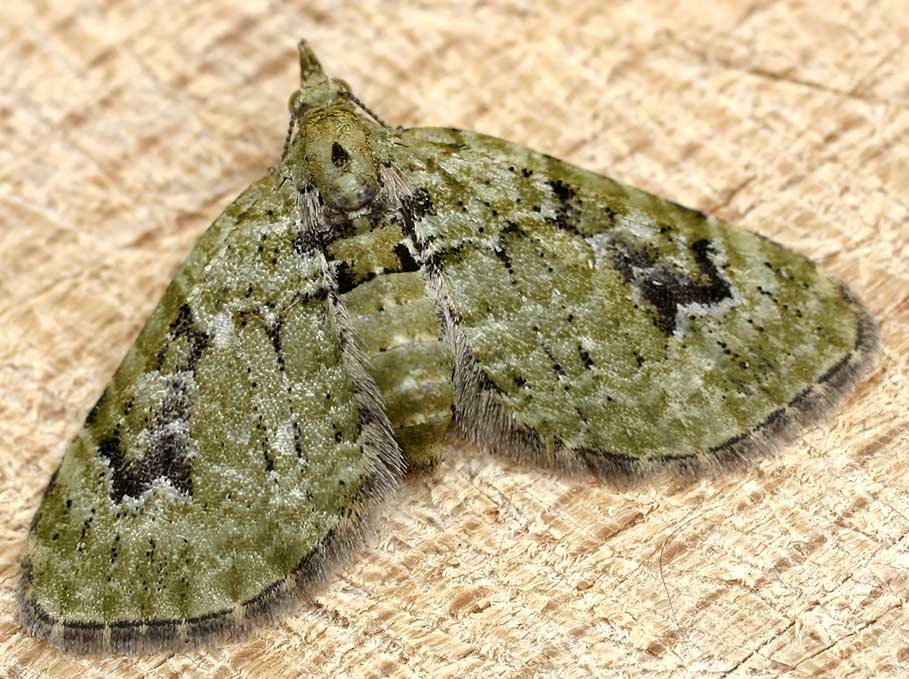

Scientific classification
- Kingdom: Animalia
- Phylum: Arthropoda
- Clade: Pancrustacea
- Class: Insecta
- Order: Lepidoptera
- Family: Geometridae
- Genus: Chloroclystis
- Species: C. v-ata

Binomial name
- Chloroclystis v-ata (Haworth, 1809)

Synonyms
- Phalaena v-ata Haworth, 1809; Geometra coronata Hubner, 1813; Chloroclystis lanceolata Vorbrodt & Muller-Rutz, 1914; Eupithecia stabiensis Stauder, 1929; Eupithecia lucinda Butler, 1879

= V-pug =

Species of moth

The v-pug (Chloroclystis v-ata) is a moth of the family Geometridae. It is found throughout the Palearctic region, the Near East and North Africa. It is well distributed in the British Isles except for the north of Scotland. The species was first described by Adrian Hardy Haworth in 1809.

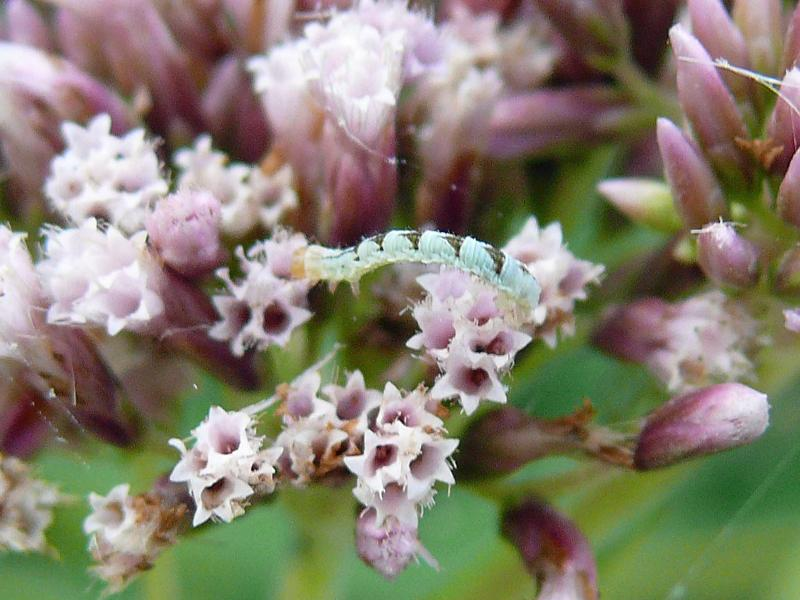
Larva

The forewings of newly emerged adults are green with a characteristic V-shaped black mark which is part of a crossline. The green colouring fades over time but the markings, small size (14–19 mm (0.55–0.75 in)) and triangular resting posture make this an easy species to identify. The hindwings are greyish white.

Either one or two broods are produced each year and adults can be seen at any time between May and August. The species flies at night and is attracted to light.

The green larva, usually with three reddish stripes, feeds on the flowers of a wide range of plants (see list below). The species overwinters as a pupa.

== Subspecies ==
- Chloroclystis v-ata lucinda (Butler, 1879)
- Chloroclystis v-ata relicta Krogerus, 1996

== Recorded food plants ==
- Achillea - yarrow
- Angelica
- Artemisia - mugwort
- Clematis
- Eupatorium
- Ligustrum - privet
- Lysimachia
- Lythrum
- Rubus
- Sambucus - elder
- Solidago - goldenrod
