= Galerucella placida =

Scientific classification
- Kingdom: Animalia
- Phylum: Arthropoda
- Clade: Pancrustacea
- Class: Insecta
- Order: Coleoptera
- Suborder: Polyphaga
- Infraorder: Cucujiformia
- Family: Chrysomelidae
- Genus: Galerucella
- Species: G. placida

Binomial name
- Galerucella placida Baly, 1878

Synonyms
- Adimonia mastersi Blackburn, 1896

Species of beetle

Galerucella placida, is a species of leaf beetle found in South Asia, Southeast Asia and Australia. It is widely used as a bio-control agent in many rice and wheat fields to control weeds.

== Description ==
Adult female is larger than male. Adult male is about 5.60 mm in length whereas adult female is 6.25 mm in length. Total life cycle of the beetle ranges from 21 days.

Eggs are bright yellow, with pyriform basally rounded and oval tip. Length of an egg is about 0.67 mm. The incubation period is about 3 days. There are three larval stages. First instar is yellowish and 1.26 mm in length. Initially second instar is also yellowish, but turn to blackish brown after an hour of feeding. Total length of second instar is about 2.64 mm. The third and final instar is about 5.59 mm in length and blackish brown. Total larval duration is about 13 days. Pupa is black and 4.58 mm in length.

== Biology ==
Adult beetles are often used as biocontrol agents on the many invasive weeds such as Rumex dentatus, Polygonum glabrum and Polygonum orientale. Adults are also attracted to the leaves of the weed, Polygonum orientale.

It also feeds on aquatic weed Polygonum hydropiper. Adults feed by scraping the green tissues from the leaves. With infestation, remaining tissue also falls by producing a hole. Heavy infestation can cause all leaf tissue to removed with holes. Larval stages also scrap the green tissue to lower epidermis which produces holes of irregular shape. Heavy infestations with grubs lead leaves to dried up and become brownish.
