= Lythrum flagellare =

Conservation status
- Vulnerable (NatureServe)

Scientific classification
- Kingdom: Plantae
- Clade: Embryophytes
- Clade: Tracheophytes
- Clade: Spermatophytes
- Clade: Angiosperms
- Clade: Eudicots
- Clade: Rosids
- Order: Myrtales
- Family: Lythraceae
- Genus: Lythrum
- Species: L. flagellare

Binomial name
- Lythrum flagellare Shuttlew. ex Chapm. 1883

Species of plant

Lythrum flagellare, also known as Florida loosestrife and lowland loosestrife, is a species of plant belonging to the family Lythraceae. It is endemic to U.S. state of Florida. The flower is known for it is sprawling habit, hence the species epithet flagellare.
