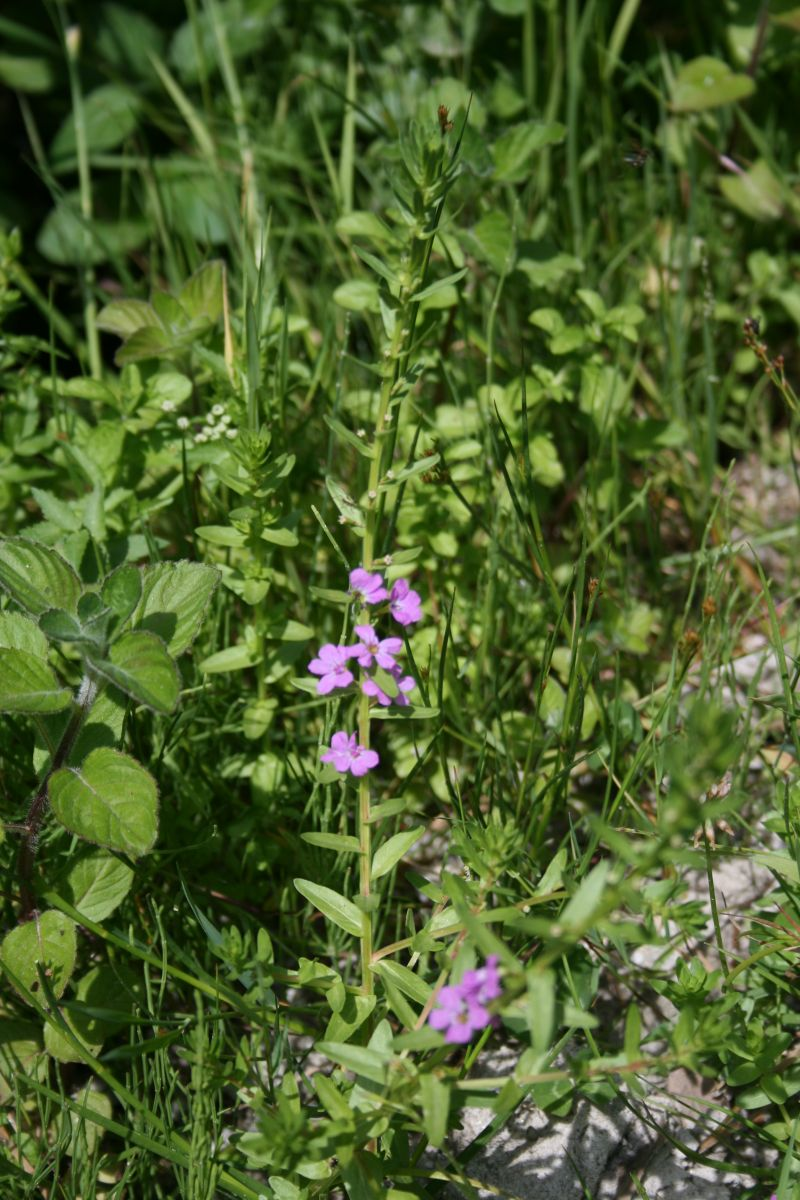

Conservation status
- Least Concern (IUCN 3.1)

Scientific classification
- Kingdom: Plantae
- Clade: Tracheophytes
- Clade: Angiosperms
- Clade: Eudicots
- Clade: Rosids
- Order: Myrtales
- Family: Lythraceae
- Genus: Lythrum
- Species: L. junceum

Binomial name
- Lythrum junceum Banks & Sol.

Synonyms
- Lythrum graefferi

= Lythrum junceum =

Species of plant

Lythrum junceum is a species of perennial herb in the family Lythraceae native to the Mediterranean Basin, West Asia and Macaronesia. They have a self-supporting growth form and simple, broad leaves. They are associated with freshwater habitat. Individuals can grow to 0.2 m.

== Sources ==
This article incorporates text from a free content work. Licensed under CC0 (license statement/permission). Text taken from Lythrum junceum. Encyclopedia of Life.
