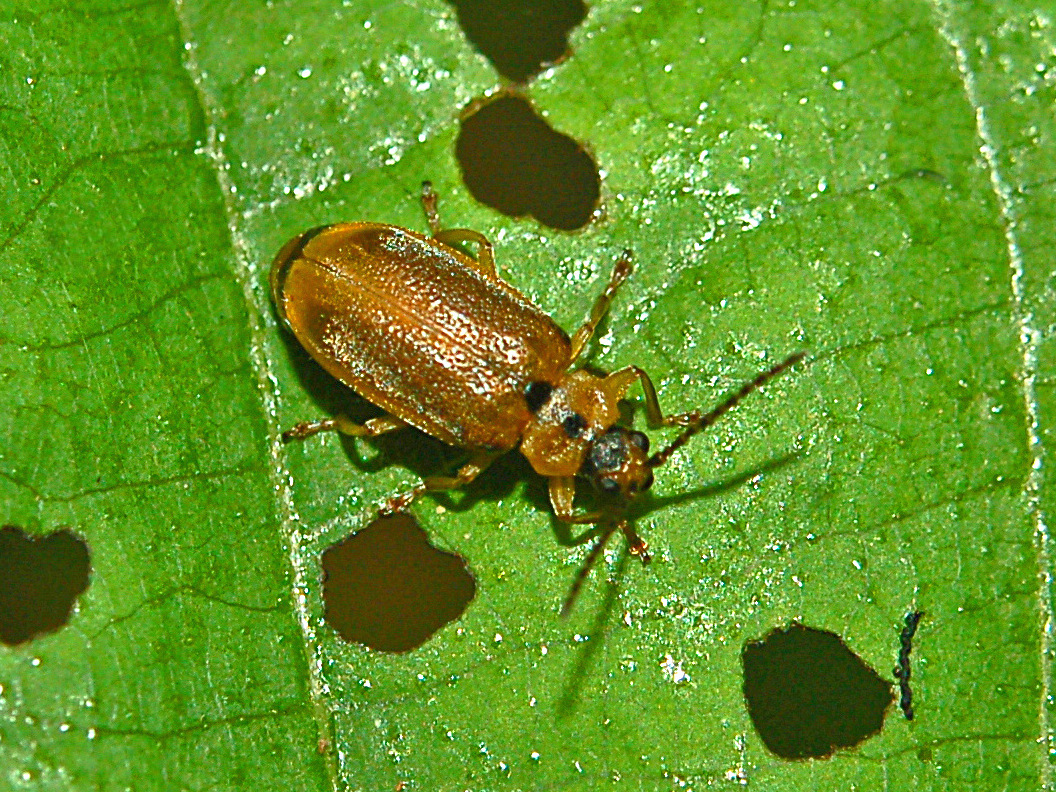
- Galerucella lineola

Scientific classification
- Kingdom: Animalia
- Phylum: Arthropoda
- Clade: Pancrustacea
- Class: Insecta
- Order: Coleoptera
- Suborder: Polyphaga
- Infraorder: Cucujiformia
- Family: Chrysomelidae
- Subfamily: Galerucinae
- Tribe: Galerucini
- Genus: Galerucella; Crotch, 1873

Synonyms
- Hydrogaleruca Laboissière, 1922

= Galerucella =

Genus of beetles

Galerucella is a genus of leaf beetles in the family Chrysomelidae described by George Robert Crotch in 1873. It is widely distributed but absent in the Neotropics. Some species feed on waterlilies and are used as biocontrol of introduced, invasive waterlilies. Galerucella tenella feed on strawberry plants.

Adults are 3.5-4.2 mm long, yellowish brown, metathorax and abdomen black; elytra evenly convex. The eggs measure 0.5-0.6 mm, globose, reddish yellow. Larvae 5–6 mm long, yellowish brown with rows of dark transverse bands and warts with setae; legs and head are black. Pupae 3.5–4 mm, black.

The immature beetles hibernate under plant remains. In the spring, in the second half of April, at a temperature of 13-14 °C, the beetles leave the wintering grounds and in addition feed: they skeletonize the leaves and gnaw through the sinuous holes. Less often damage the petioles of leaves, inflorescences and flowers. During the extension of the buds, the females lay 1 or 2 eggs each day in the gnawed holes on the underside of the leaves. The period of egg laying is stretched, up to 30 to 45 days. Fertility - 150-200 eggs. Embryonic development lasts from 12 to 20 days. Larvae live 25 to 30 days, skeletonize the leaves. After completing its development, they pass to the surface layer of the soil near the plants and pupate. Beetles that come out after 8 to 12 days, eat leaves for a while, after which they pass to wintering. One generation per year develops.

== Species ==
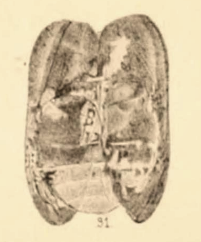
Galerucella picea (1890 illustration)

Galerucella contains the following species, divided into two subgenera Galerucella and Neogalerucella (the latter of which is sometimes considered a separate genus):

Subgenus Galerucella Crotch, 1873

- Galerucella aludela Maulik, 1936
- Galerucella amboinensis Jacoby, 1894
- Galerucella angulosa Pic, 1928
- Galerucella aquatica (Geoffroy in Fourcroy, 1785)
- Galerucella aurata Maulik, 1936
- Galerucella bataviensis Hornstedt, 1788
- Galerucella birmanica (Jacoby, 1889)
- Galerucella chujoi Komiya, 2005
- Galerucella consentanea (Hope, 1831)
- Galerucella grisescens (Joannis, 1866)
- Galerucella nipponensis (Laboissière, 1932)
- Galerucella nymphaeae (Linnaeus, 1758) – waterlily leaf beetle
- Galerucella ohkurai Kimoto & Takahashi, 1992
- Galerucella ozeana Nakane, 1963
- †Galerucella picea Scudder, 1879 - (Ypresian, Allenby Formation, Canada)
- Galerucella placida Baly, 1878
- Galerucella sagittariae (Gyllenhal, 1813

Subgenus Neogalerucella Chûjô, 1962:

- Galerucella anserina Ødegaard & Hanssen, 2020
- Galerucella calmariensis (Linnaeus, 1767) – loosestrife leaf beetle
- Galerucella fossata (Chen, 1942)
- Galerucella lineola (Fabricius, 1781)
- Galerucella medvedevi Beenen, 2008
- Galerucella pusilla (Duftschmid, 1825) – golden loosestrife beetle
- Galerucella quebecensis Brown, 1938
- Galerucella semenowi (Rybakow, 1889)
- Galerucella stefanssoni Brown, 1938
- Galerucella tenella (Linnaeus, 1761) – strawberry leaf beetle
