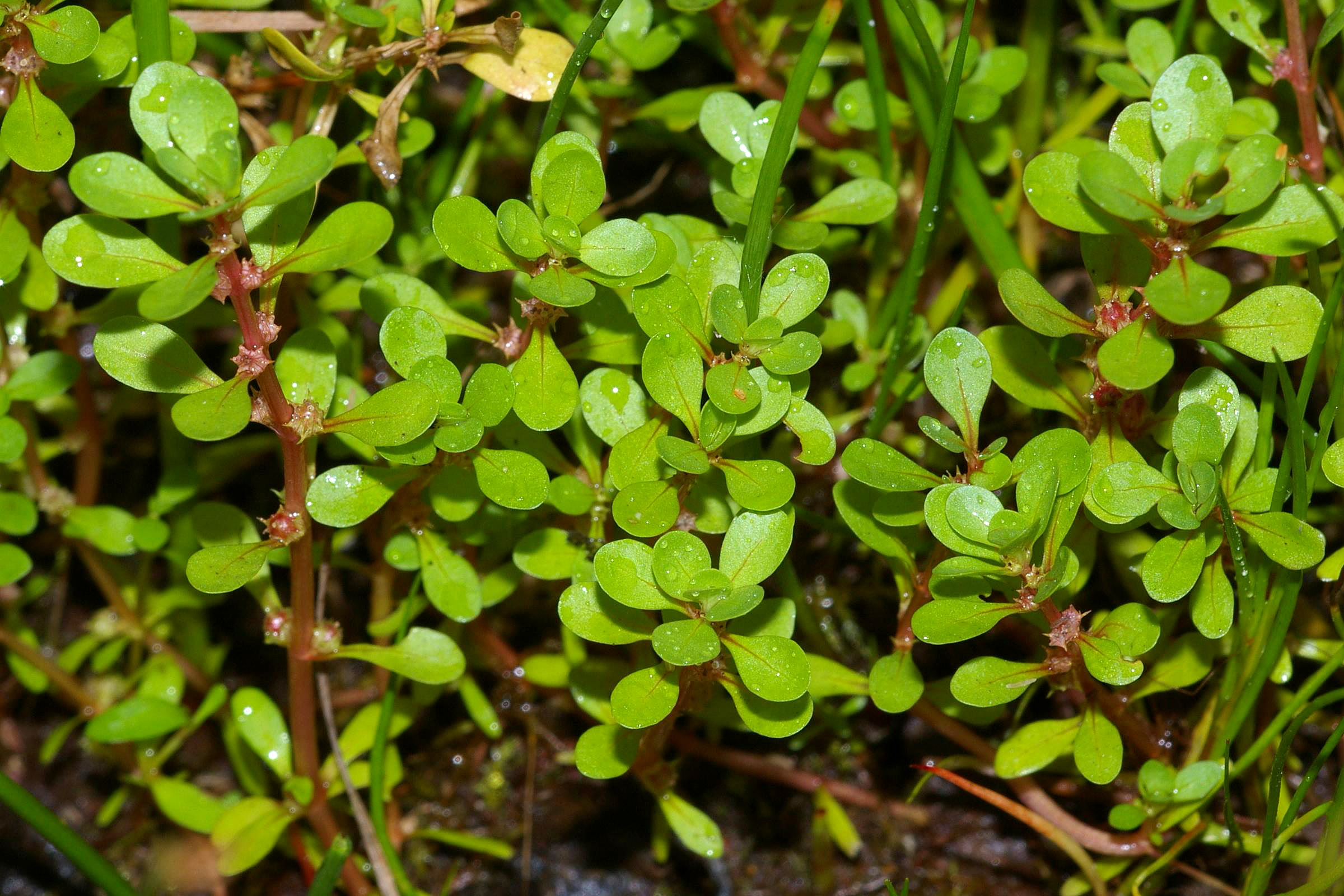

Scientific classification
- Kingdom: Plantae
- Clade: Tracheophytes
- Clade: Angiosperms
- Clade: Eudicots
- Clade: Rosids
- Order: Myrtales
- Family: Lythraceae
- Genus: Lythrum
- Species: L. portula

Binomial name
- Lythrum portula (L.) D.A.Webb

Synonyms
- Peplis portula L.

= Lythrum portula =

Species of flowering plant

Lythrum portula is a species of flowering plant in the loosestrife family known by the common names water-purslane and spatulaleaf loosestrife. It is native to Europe, and it is found in parts of western North America as an introduced species. It often grows in moist habitat, such as marshes.

This is a prostrate annual herb producing a hairless, reddish stem up to 25 centimeters long, which lies along the ground and roots where its nodes come in contact with wet earth. The slightly fleshy, spoon-shaped leaves are about a centimeter long and greenish to reddish in color. Solitary flowers occur in leaf axils. Flowers often have white or pink petals about a millimeter long, but some lack petals. The fruit is a spherical capsule containing minute seeds.
