= Neogalerucella pusilla =

Scientific classification
- Kingdom: Animalia
- Phylum: Arthropoda
- Clade: Pancrustacea
- Class: Insecta
- Order: Coleoptera
- Suborder: Polyphaga
- Infraorder: Cucujiformia
- Family: Chrysomelidae
- Genus: Neogalerucella
- Species: N. pusilla

Binomial name
- Neogalerucella pusilla (Duftschmid, 1825)

Species of beetle

Neogalerucella pusilla is a species of skeletonizing leaf beetle in the family Chrysomelidae. It is found in Europe and Northern Asia (excluding China) and North America.
