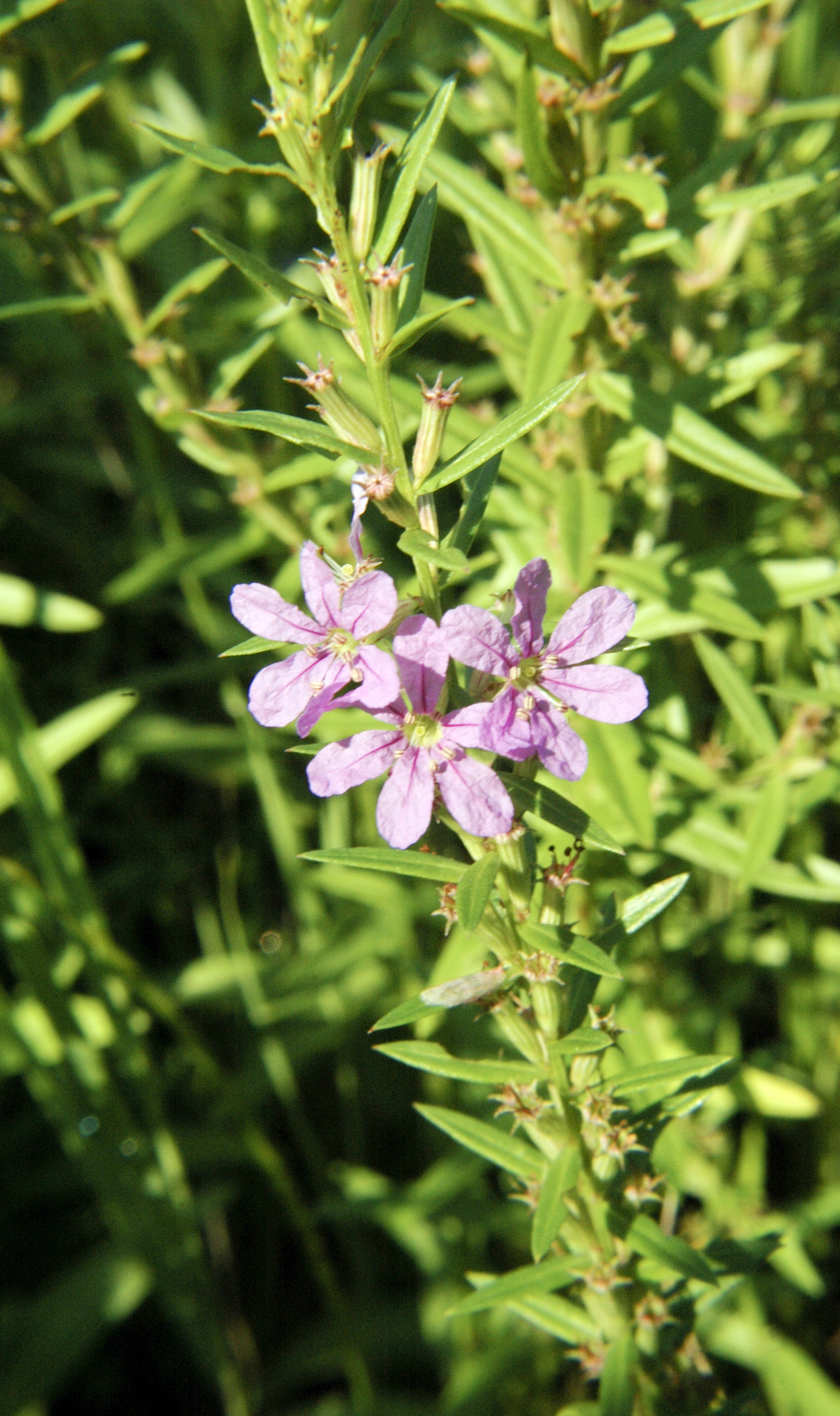

Conservation status
- Least Concern (IUCN 3.1)

- Secure (NatureServe)

Scientific classification
- Kingdom: Plantae
- Clade: Embryophytes
- Clade: Tracheophytes
- Clade: Spermatophytes
- Clade: Angiosperms
- Clade: Eudicots
- Clade: Rosids
- Order: Myrtales
- Family: Lythraceae
- Genus: Lythrum
- Species: L. alatum

Binomial name
- Lythrum alatum Pursh

Varieties
- L. alatum var. alatum; L. alatum var. lanceolatum

Synonyms
- List: Pythagorea alata (Pursh) Raf.; Salicaria alata (Pursh) Lunell

= Lythrum alatum =

Plant species in the loosestrife family

Lythrum alatum, commonly known as winged loosestrife, winged lythrum or (in Britain and Ireland) angled purple-loosestrife, is a species of flowering plant belonging to the family Lythraceae. It is endemic to wetland areas in central and eastern United States and Ontario.

== Description ==
Winged loosestrife is an upright, branching herbaceous plant growing to about one metre tall. The stems are woody in the lower parts of the plant, square in cross section with slightly winged angles. The leaves are mostly opposite, stalk-less, broadly oblong and tapering towards the tip. They have smooth un-toothed edges. The flowers are borne singly or in pairs in the axils of the much reduced upper leaves. The calyx forms a tube about 0.6 millimetres long and has six pointed teeth. The six rose-pink petals have a magenta central vein and are about 5 millimetres long and 2 millimetres wide. There are six stamens with pink filaments and purple anthers. The stigma is white and the style green. The ovary is superior and the fruit is an elongated capsule with numerous tiny seeds.

== Habitat ==
Winged loosestrife is found growing in wet meadows and fens, pond and lake margins, beside streams and by railroads.

== Conservation status in the United States ==
It is listed as endangered in Connecticut, Maryland, and Pennsylvania. It was thought to be extinct in Vermont until it was found in the town of Monkton in 2017.

== As a noxious weed in the United States ==
The Lythrum genus is listed as a noxious weed in Michigan, North Carolina, and Wisconsin.

== Native American ethnobotany ==
The Cherokee take an infusion for Lythrum alatum var. lanceolatum for the kidneys.
