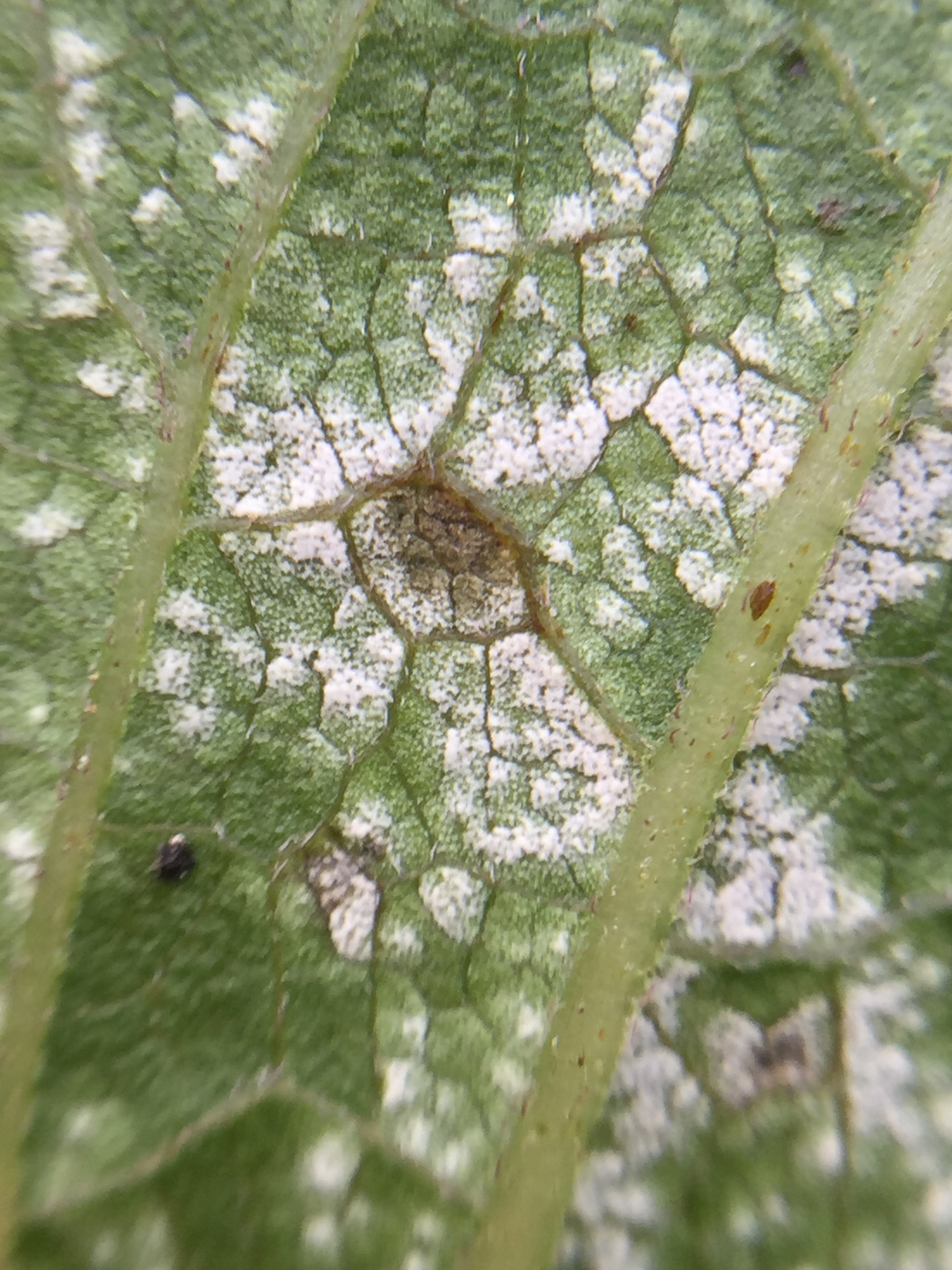
- Entyloma ageratinae on the underside of an Ageratina riparia leaf

Scientific classification
- Kingdom: Fungi
- Division: Basidiomycota
- Class: Exobasidiomycetes
- Order: Entylomatales
- Family: Entylomataceae
- Genus: Entyloma
- Species: E. ageratinae

Binomial name
- Entyloma ageratinae Barreto & Evans, 1988

Synonyms
- Cercosporella argeratina (nomen nudum) E.E. Trujillo (1976); Entyloma compositarum f. sp. Ageratinae E.E. Trujillo

= Entyloma ageratinae =

Species of fungus

Entyloma ageratinae, commonly known as the mist flower smut, is a species of leaf smut fungus. As a plant pathogen, it is widely employed as a biological herbicide in the control of Ageratina riparia, an ornamental plant which is native to Mexico, but now invasive in a variety of tropical climates. The fungus was given its current scientific name and classified within the genus Entyloma in 1988.

E. ageratinae grows exclusively on A. riparia plants in the wild, though specimens of Ageratina adenophora have contracted the fungus in laboratory trials. On A. riparia, the fungus forms lesions on the plant's leaves, causing them to die prematurely and stunting the growth of the plant. The fungus has a short life cycle and forms spores on the underside of leaves within 10 days of infecting the plant. Its spores spread most quickly in damp, windy environments.

The fungus was first collected by scientists searching for a naturally occurring control agent of A. riparia in Jamaica in 1974. Specimens were then transported to Hawaii, where they were examined and trialled as a control agent. After the species' proven success at weakening A. riparia populations, it was implemented in wide reaching projects in Hawaii and New Zealand. The pathogen is now naturalized in Hawaii, New Zealand, Australia, and South Africa.

== Taxonomy ==
The fungus was initially considered a species within the genus Cercosporella, and was recorded as the undescribed taxon Cercosporella sp. in the 1960s. In 1976, E.E. Trujillo named the species Cercosporella ageratina. However, this name was a nomen nudum, an invalidly published name. Unlike other species of Cercosporella, the fungus has aseptate conidia, leading taxonomists to question its classifiaction within Cercosporella.

In 1988, the species was formally described by R.W. Barreto and H.C. Evans as Entyloma ageratinae, within the genus Entyloma. That same year, however, Trujillo argued that the fungus was not a distinct species and should be considered part of Entyloma compositarum as it closely resembles the latter's anamorph phase. According to Trujillo, it should be classified as the forma specialis E. compositarum f. sp. Ageratinae, as the existing name is based on the species' host rather than its distinct morphological characteristics. Despite Trujillo's arguments against it, the status of E. ageratinae as a separate species has been widely accepted since 1988.

== Description ==
The fungus grows almost exclusively on A. riparia plants. The only other known species to develop symptoms of the disease is Ageratina adenophora. Though the two species are closely related, the disease's effects on A. adenophora are comparatively benign; it does not form spores and produces only small lesions. Contraction by A. adenophora is rare, and has only been documented in laboratory trials.

E. ageratinae is both a biotrophic and necrotropic pathogen, consuming both living and dead matter. The fungus initially forms small, circular chlorotic lesions on the upper surface of living A. riparia leaves. These lesions expand, darken and turn reddish-brown as the pathogen becomes necrotic. White, aseptate, holoblastic spores form on the underside of leaves 7–10 days after infection. Infected leaves eventually wilt and fall off the main plant prematurely, stunting its growth. The fungus may also cause shoots to die off.

The species has a short life cycle and spreads most quickly in windy environments with heavy rainfall. A. Ageratinae develops most quickly at 18 °C, and can spread at temperatures between 10 °C to 20 °C. The fungus cannot reproduce at temperatures above 20 °C, as its spores will not germinate or infect host plants.

=== Similar species ===
The species E. ageratinae-altissimae is closely related. It was formerly considered a variant of E. ageratinae in 1963 as E. compositarum var. eupatorii, however, this name is considered invalid. The species was identified as distinct from E. ageratinae in 2026 by Denchev & T. Denchev. E. ageratinae-altissimae has larger spores and thicker spore walls. It grows on Ageratina altissima and was identified in North America.

== Development as a biological control agent ==
A. riparia was first introduced to Hawaii as an ornamental plant around 1925 and is locally known as Hamakua pa-makani. The plant was first documented as naturalised near Hilo in 1926. It thrived in the moist climate of Hawaii, preferring ditches and low pastures. By 1930, it had spread to much of the northwest of the island. Mid-19th century methods to control the plant on the island included spraying affected areas with a solution of arsenic or calcium chlorate. These early methods were not only toxic to the native ecosystem, but proved ineffective at limiting the spread of the plant. By 1973, A. riparia had infested an estimated 62,500 ha of the island of Hawaii.

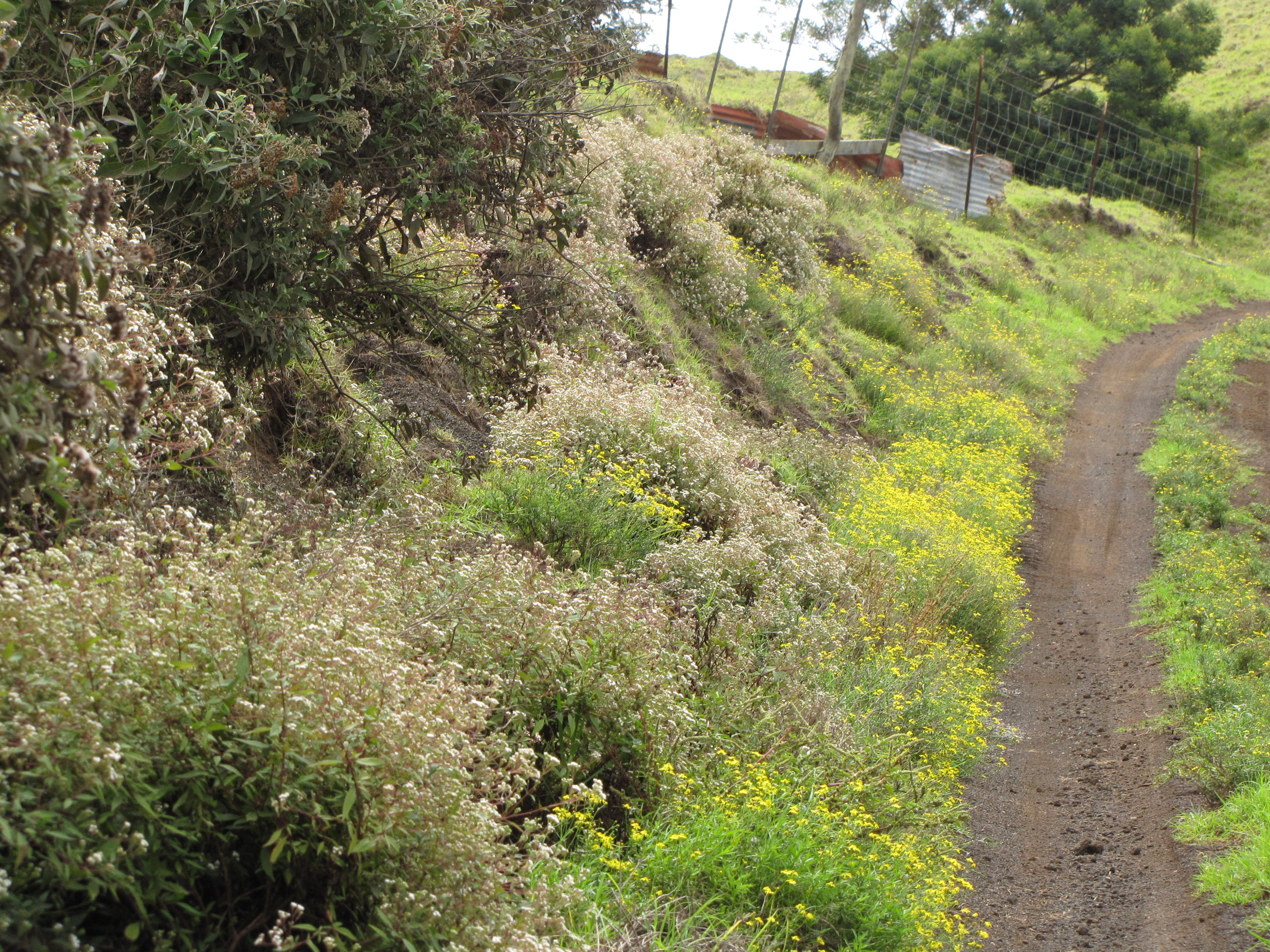
Hillside covered with white flowering A. riparia and yellow Senecio madagascariensis. Maui, Hawaii, 2013.

A $10,000 grant provided by Barbara Cox Anthony funded a total of three trips in search of naturally occurring biological control agents for A. riparia. The first two trips to the species' center of origin in Mexico in 1973 and 1974 were ultimately unsuccessful. A rust fungus was identified in El Mirador, but limited biological information meant that it could not be transported back to Hawaii due to pathogenic quarantine regulations.

A third expedition made to Jamaica in 1974 successfully discovered diseased plants in the Blue Mountains. A. riparia is believed to have been introduced to Jamaica from Mexico as an ornamental plant, but did not become invasive. Importantly, none of the adjacent crops or flora in Jamaica showed symptoms of infection by the pathogen. Because the fungus appeared highly specific to A. riparia, it was permitted for live transportation to Hawaii by the Department of Agriculture and the Federal Animal and Plant Health Inspection Service. Diseased branches of the plant were collected and placed in iced plastic bags. On arrival to Hawaii 48 hours later, five diseased leaves had survived the trip. These five leaves were used as the initial sources of inoculation for Hawaiian A. riparia plants in a quarantine terrarium in Manoa.

A host-range study was conducted in 1974 which concluded that E. ageratinae was specific to A. riparia and did not pose a significant threat to native flora. A permit was granted by Hawaii's Board of Agriculture for field inoculations of the fungus in 1975. A 1975 field test conducted on the Tantalus Ridge on Oahu proved the species' success as a biological agent. Initial assessments showed that the ridge was 80% covered by A. riparia. Within nine months, its population had dropped to less than 1%. Final assessments in 1975 concluded that the species was under control at the site, and most of the ground space formerly occupied by the plant had been covered by indigenous plant species.

Further inoculations were made at infested sites on Oahu and the island of Hawaii. No inoculations were made on Maui, but the disease was discovered at the 7 Pools in Maui six months after an inoculation at Kona. The pathogen appeared to have spread voluntarily across the ʻAlenuihāhā Channel. By 1985, more than 50,000 ha of rangeland had been restored. The majority of Hawaiian rangelands had been fully restored by 1992. The success of the disease's spread correlates to the amount of rainfall; it spreads more effectively in moist areas. As of 2005, some plants survive in regions which receive ca. 0.90 m/annum of precipitation. A. riparia is currently classified as under control in Hawaii. No evidence of pathogenic mutation of E. ageratinae or its spread to other species has been documented on the islands.

== Further distribution ==
=== New Zealand ===
A. riparia was first introduced to New Zealand as an ornamental plant in the 1930s. It quickly spread and became naturalised on the North Island. It proved particularly invasive in open areas, on slopes, and on the edges of forests and wetlands. In areas where the plant was dominant, sediment built up more quickly and slopes were less stable than with native ground cover. The species often overtook and smothered flora less than a meter tall. It posed a threat to the ecosystem as a whole, but In 1996 was reported as an active threat to two native plants in particular: Veronica bishopiana and Veronica rivalis.

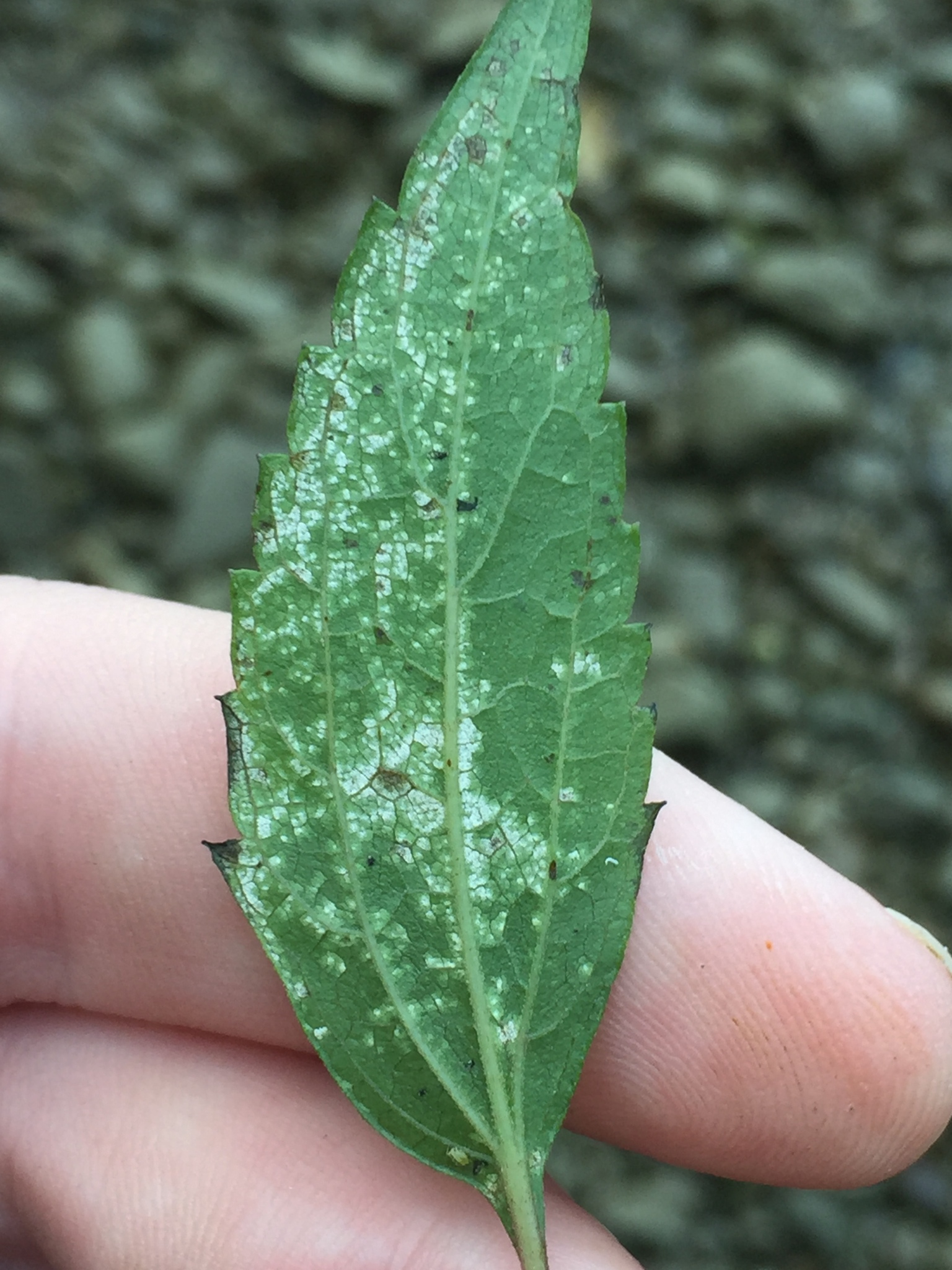
Entyloma ageratinae on the abaxial leaf surfaces of Ageratina riparia in Hillsborough, Auckland

Following the success of the biological control program in Hawaii, a similar approach was adopted. Test trials of E. ageratinae were run which exposed 35 plant species to the pathogen. Only A. riparia and A. adenophora developed symptoms of the fungus. As A. adenophora is also invasive in New Zealand and only developed small lesions which did not produce spores, its possible contraction of the disease was not a concern. The New Zealand Ministry of Agriculture permitted the pathogen to be released in 1998. Host specimens were sent from Hawaii on 5 October 1998. These were released at nine infestation sites by the end of the year. Another control agent, the fruit fly Procecidochares alani, was also released in 2004. P. alani also became established in New Zealand, but E. ageratinae had controlled the mistflower population before the impact of the second agent could be measured.

The fungus spread quickly across the North Island, both through wind dispersal of spores and by inadvertent trafficking by humans and other animals. The warm and breezy climate of the North Island likely contributed to the rapid spread of the disease. It is now naturalized on the North Island. On average, the population of A. riparia declined by 85% as a result of the introduction of E. ageratinae in New Zealand, and native ground cover has returned to the areas affected.

=== South Africa ===
A. riparia was first introduced to South Africa during the early 20th century. The first known specimen of the species was documented in 1955 in Chase Valley, Pietermaritzburg. From Chase Valley it spread to Hilton and Sweetwaters, but has remained largely confined to these areas. Diseased A. riparia leaves were secured from the University of Hawaii in November 1986 and E. ageratinae was introduced to South Africa via the Hawaiian specimens in November, 1989 at a single inoculation site in Hilton. By 1990, the disease was well established in the area.

The introduction of the pathogen in South Africa was a more precautionary and preventive measure as compared to the reconciliatory efforts of Hawaii and New Zealand. Some researchers have noted that although A. riparia is not native to South Africa, it was not at high risk of becoming invasive. The plant thrives in warm, moist climates, and the majority of the country does not receive enough precipitation to foster such growth. However, significant areas of land which are untouched by the plant would be ideal for its growth. As of 2011, the plant has not spread beyond its existing area. A 2009 survey found that most mistflower plants in South Africa were affected by E. ageratinae, suggesting that the introduction of the fungus prevented it from spreading.

=== Australia ===
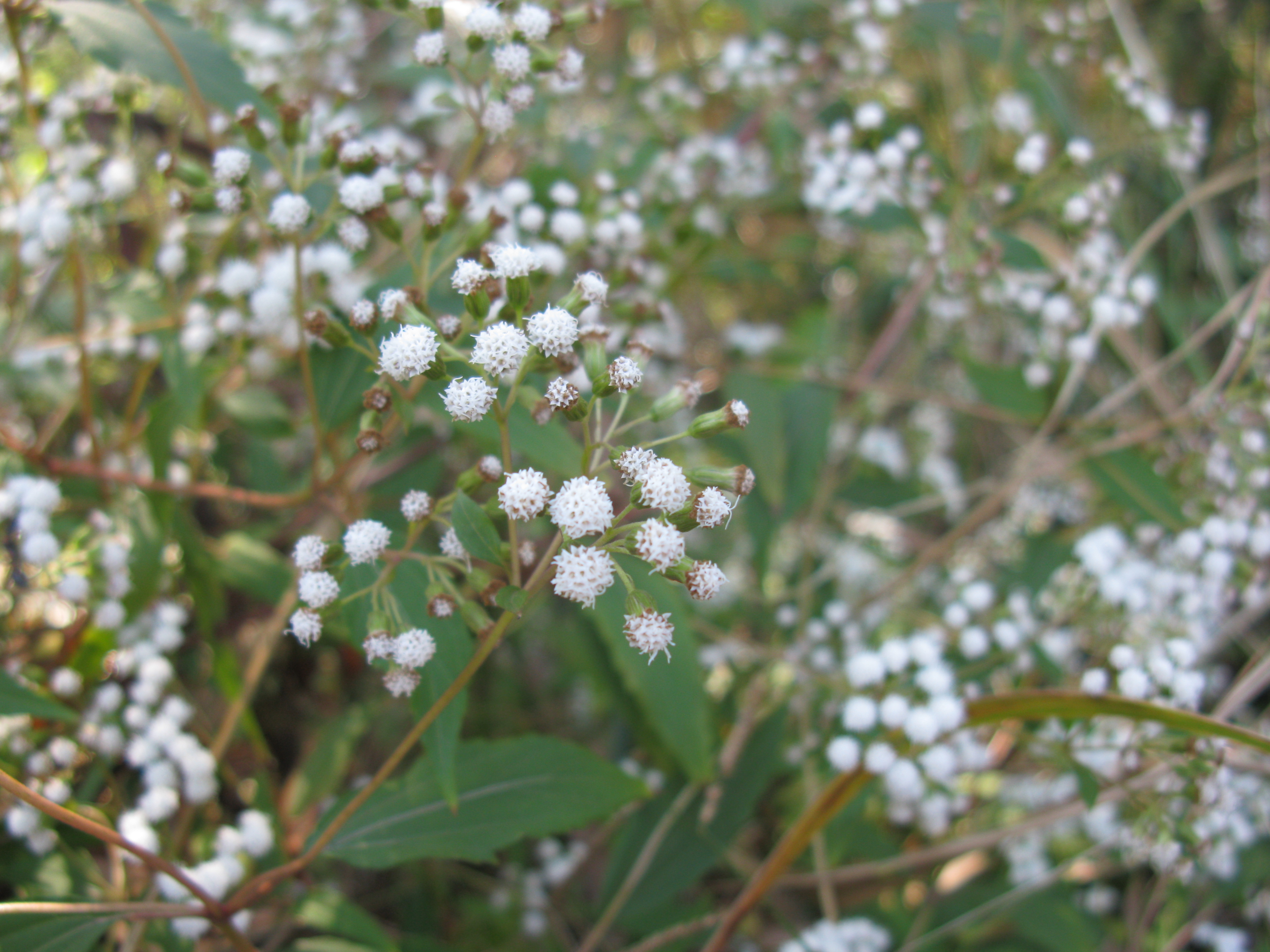
Healthy, uninfected Ageratina riparia in Australia.

A. riparia was first introduced to New South Wales as an ornamental plant in around 1875. The species was cultivated by botanical gardens in Adelaide, Melbourne, Sydney, and Brisbane in 1901. It quickly escaped from cultivation and had naturalised in Springbrook by 1930. In 1952, the species was declared a noxious weed in Australia. A. riparia poses a significant threat to native ecosystems in the mountainous regions of southern Queensland and northern New South Wales, which receive high precipitation.

Following successful uses of E. ageratinae as a biological control agent in Hawaii and New Zealand, the species was a candidate for similar projects in Australia, but these were never implemented. Without being intentionally introduced, the fungus was identified on mistflower leaves near Lamington National Park on 21 October 2010. Further surveys found that the fungus had naturalized on the northern and central coast in New South Wales, though it had not spread to the south. The fungus was present along much of Australia's eastern coast, though largely confined to Queensland and New South Wales. Specimens have also been identified on Norfolk Island. In May 2011, further A. riparia plants in New South Wales were intentionally inoculated after host-specificity tests found the fungus was highly specific and did not pose a threat to native flora. These tests found that the pathogen only posed an additional threat to A. adenophora, which is also invasive in the region. By July 2012, the plant cover of A. riparia had decreased at tests sites in New South Wales and Queensland by an average of over 60%.
