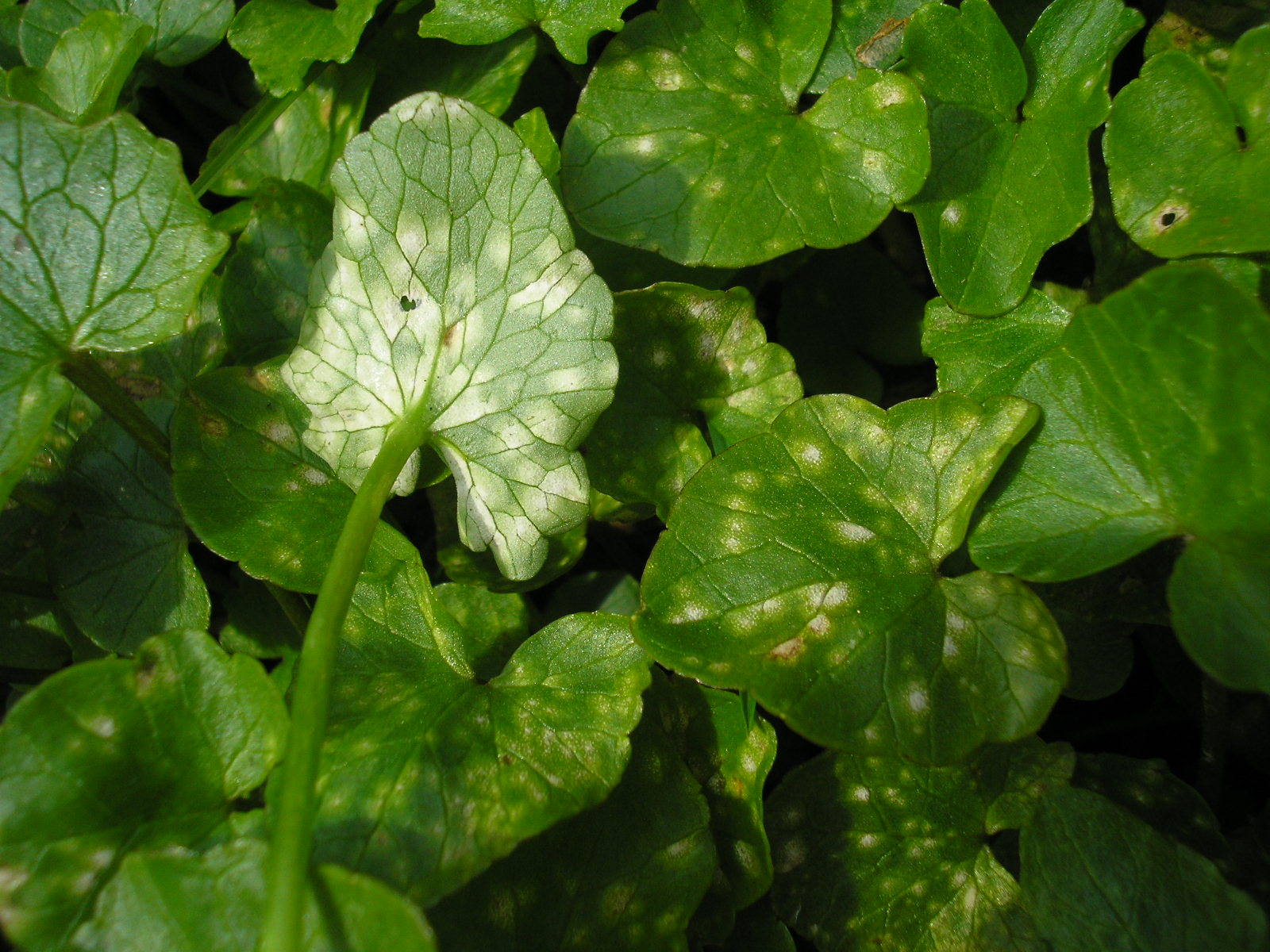
- Leaves of Ficaria verna infected by Entyloma ficariae.

Scientific classification
- Kingdom: Fungi
- Division: Basidiomycota
- Class: Exobasidiomycetes
- Order: Entylomatales
- Family: Entylomataceae
- Genus: Entyloma
- Species: E. ficariae

Binomial name
- Entyloma ficariae Fischer von Waldheim, 1877

Synonyms
- Entyloma ranunculi (Bonorden) Schröter, 1877

= Entyloma ficariae =

Plant-pathogenic smut fungus

Entyloma ficariae is a smut fungus which infects the leaves of Ficaria verna.

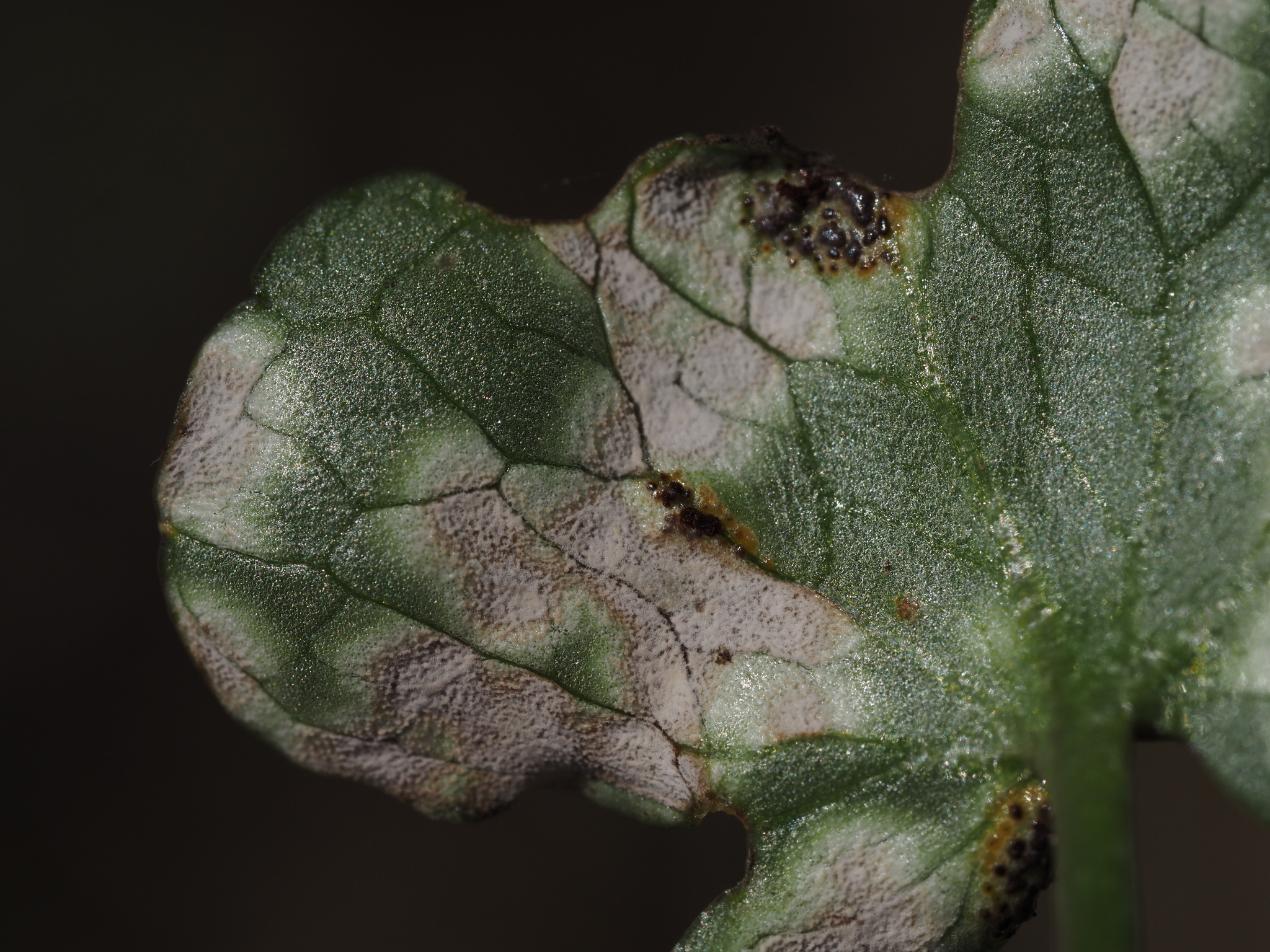
Conidiophores of Entyloma ficariae on the underside of a leaf of Ficaria verna.
