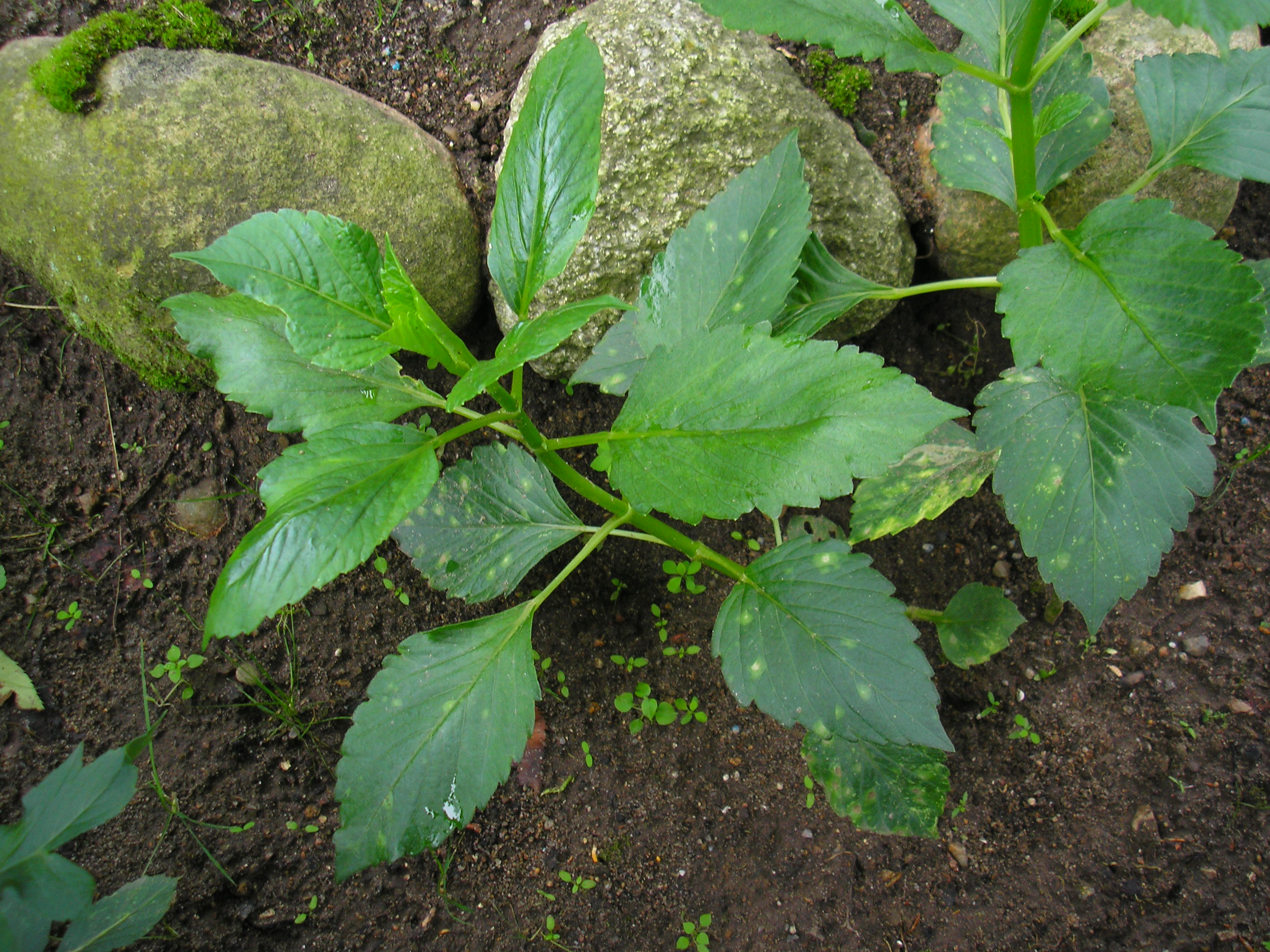

Scientific classification
- Domain: Eukaryota
- Kingdom: Fungi
- Division: Basidiomycota
- Class: Exobasidiomycetes
- Order: Entylomatales
- Family: Entylomataceae
- Genus: Entyloma
- Species: E. dahliae

Binomial name
- Entyloma dahliae Syd. & P.Syd. (1912)

Synonyms
- Entyloma dahliae Cif. (1924); Entyloma calendulae f. dahliae (Syd. & P.Syd.) Viégas (1944); Entylomella dahliae Cif. ex Boerema & Hamers (1990)

= Entyloma dahliae =

Species of fungus

Entyloma dahliae is a species of smut fungus in the family Entylomataceae. It is the causative agent of Dahlia leaf smut. The species was described in 1912 by Hans Sydow and Paul Sydow.
