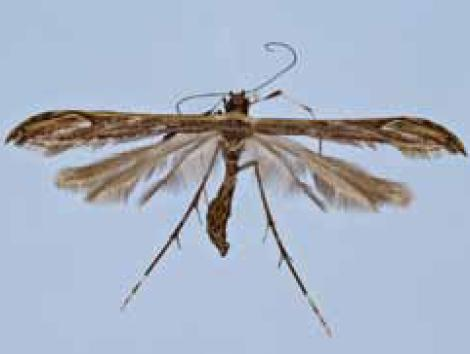

Scientific classification
- Kingdom: Animalia
- Phylum: Arthropoda
- Clade: Pancrustacea
- Class: Insecta
- Order: Lepidoptera
- Family: Pterophoridae
- Genus: Hellinsia
- Species: H. beneficus

Binomial name
- Hellinsia beneficus (Yano & Heppner, 1983)

Synonyms
- Oidaematophorus beneficus Yano & Heppner, 1983; Leioptilus beneficus Miller & Gielis, 1995

= Hellinsia beneficus =

Species of plume moth

Hellinsia beneficus is a moth of the family Pterophoridae. It is native to Mexico, but was introduced to Hawaii in 1973 as a biological control agent against mistflower, Ageratina riparia.

== Taxonomy ==
The species was identified by Kôji Yano and John B. Heppner in 1983 as Oidaematophorus beneficus. In 1995, it was transferred to the genus Leiptilus by Miller and Gielis and the species became known as Leioptilus beneficus. The genus is now recognised as Hellinsia and the species as H. beneficus.

== Description ==
The wingspan is 22–28 millimetres (0.87–1.10 in). Adults are on wing in February and July, at an altitude of 450 to 1,350 metres (1,480 to 4,430 ft). The moth prefers higher altitudes and has rarely been observed below 460 m (1500 ft) by researchers in Hawaii.

The larvae feed on Ageratina riparia. Pupation takes place on leaves or in litter at the base of the plant or on the stem. The moth larvae create smooth edged holes in the plant's leaves, which stunt its growth. Because the A. riparia is highly invasive in tropical climates, the moth has been used as a biological control agent to slow its growth. Although the larvae are highly specific to A. riparia, they have also reportedly been found feeding on A. adenophora in Hawaii.

The parasitoid wasp, Meteorus laphygmae has been observed parasitizing the species' larvae in Hawaii.

== Distribution ==
H. beneficus is native to Mexico, in the region which its larval host plant, A. riparia originates. The species of moth has since been introduced to other regions as a biological control agent against A. riparia. After collecting specimens from Mexico, unsuccessful attempts were made to introduce the species to Hawaii in 1959 and 1965. The moth was successfully introduced in Hawaii in 1973 when a total of approximately 1525 specimens from Contreras, Mexico were released at Mt. Kaala and Kona.
