= Entyloma ellisii =

Scientific classification
- Domain: Eukaryota
- Kingdom: Fungi
- Division: Basidiomycota
- Class: Exobasidiomycetes
- Order: Entylomatales
- Family: Entylomataceae
- Genus: Entyloma
- Species: E. ellisii

Binomial name
- Entyloma ellisii Halst. (1890)

Species of fungus

Entyloma ellisii is a plant pathogen.
