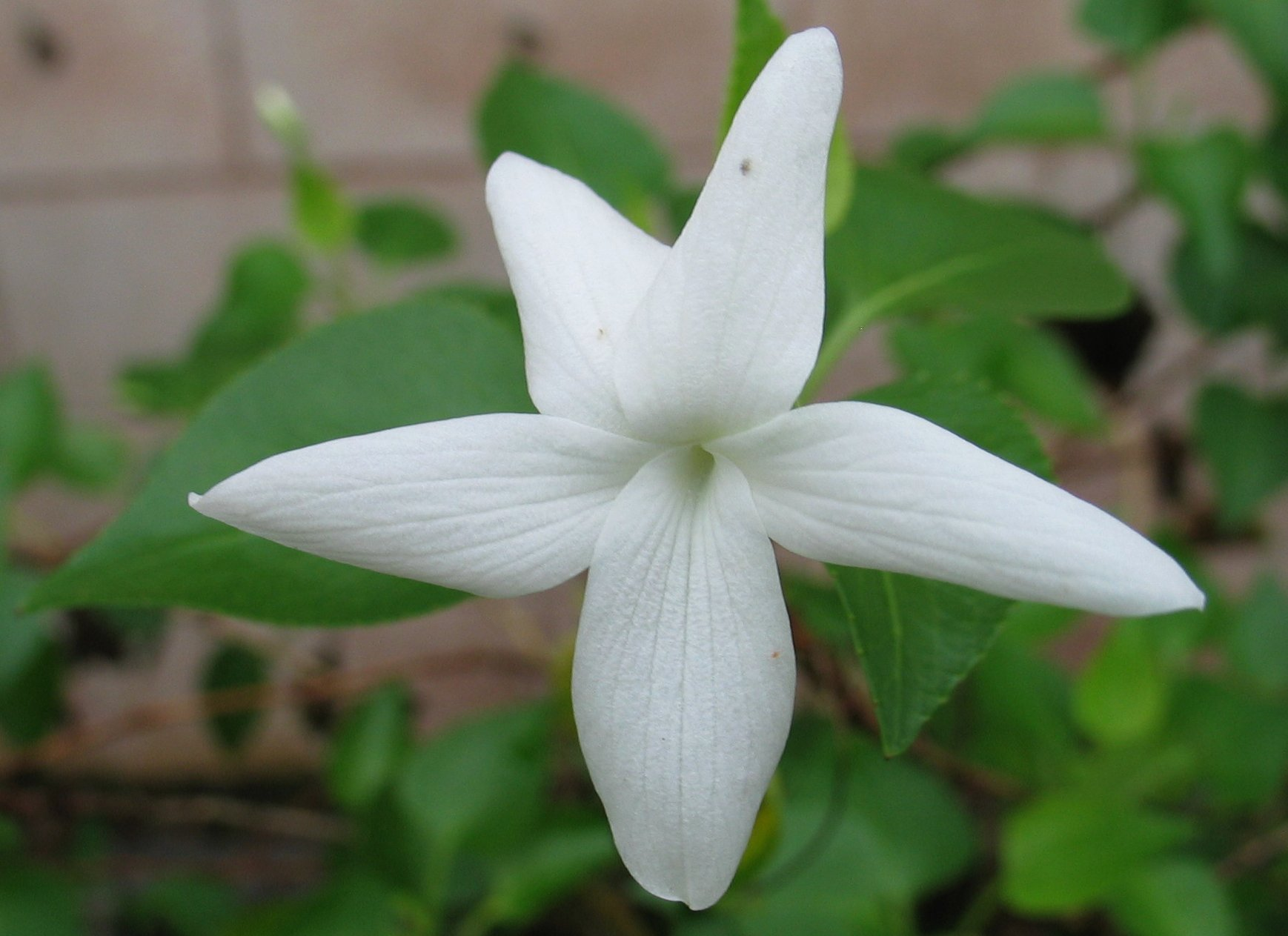

Conservation status
- Imperiled (NatureServe)

Scientific classification
- Kingdom: Plantae
- Clade: Tracheophytes
- Clade: Angiosperms
- Clade: Eudicots
- Clade: Rosids
- Order: Malpighiales
- Family: Violaceae
- Genus: Viola
- Species: V. chamissoniana

Binomial name
- Viola chamissoniana Gingins

= Viola chamissoniana =

Species of flowering plant

Viola chamissoniana is a species of flowering plant in the violet family known by the common name 'olopu. It is endemic to Hawaii, where it is known from the islands of Kauai, Oahu, Molokai, and Maui.

This plant is a woody shrub growing from a taproot and rooting where the lower stem comes in contact with the substrate. The leaves are up to 29 centimeters long by 9 wide and have toothed edges. The purple-tinged white flowers have petals measuring 1 to 2 centimeters long. The fruit is a capsule 1 to 2 centimeters in length, which contains small dark-colored seeds.

There are three subspecies of this plant. Subspecies tracheliifolia is common. Subspecies chamissoniana is a federally listed endangered species of the United States which is limited to Oahu. There are three populations in the Waianae Range containing a total of about 443 individuals. Most of the plants grow on steep cliffs, but fences are in place to protect them from feral goats. Another threat is exotic plants such as Maui pamakani (Ageratina adenophora).
