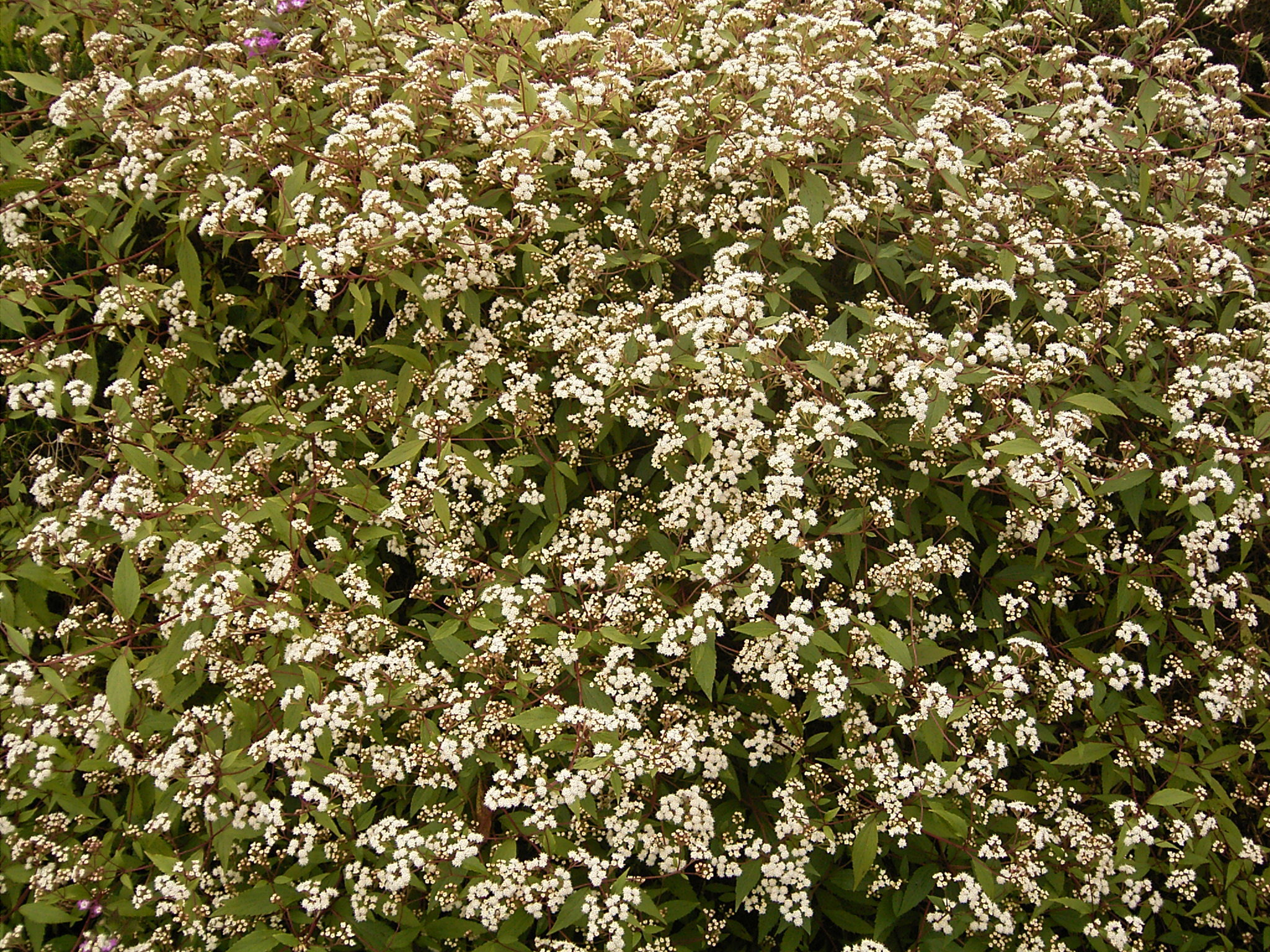

Conservation status
- Unranked (NatureServe)

Scientific classification
- Kingdom: Plantae
- Clade: Tracheophytes
- Clade: Angiosperms
- Clade: Eudicots
- Clade: Asterids
- Order: Asterales
- Family: Asteraceae
- Genus: Ageratina
- Species: A. riparia

Binomial name
- Ageratina riparia (Regel) R.M.King & H.Rob.

Synonyms
- Ageratina ventillana (Cuatrec.) R.M.King & H.Rob.; Eupatorium harrisii Urb.; Eupatorium riparium Regel; Eupatorium ventillanum Cuatrec.; Fleischmannia repens B.L.Rob.

= Ageratina riparia =

Species of flowering plant

Ageratina riparia, commonly known as mistflower, is a species of flowering plant in the family Asteraceae, native to Mexico. The species is widely adventive and has spread to Cuba, Jamaica, and other parts of the Caribbean. It has also been introduced as an ornamental plant and naturalized in a variety of regions, including parts of Hawaii, South Africa, Southeast Asia, Macaronesia, Oceania, Peru, and the Indian subcontinent. In tropical climates, A. riparia is highly invasive and a variety of control methods have been developed to reduce its spread.

== Taxonomy ==
The species was identified by Eduard Regel as Eupatorium riparium in the 1866 edition of Gartenflora. It was given its current classification as member of the genus Ageratina by Robert Merrill King and Harold E. Robinson in a 1970 edition of Phytologia. The species has several heterotypic synonyms, including: Ageratina repens, Ageratina ventillana, Eupatorium harrisii, Eupatorium ventillanum, and Fleischmannia repens.

The name Ageratina is derived from Greek meaning "un-aging", in reference to the way the plant's flowers keep their color for an extended period of time. This name was used by Dioscorides for a number of different plants. The name riparia is derived from the Latin word ripa meaning "riverbank"' or "streambank". The suffix -aris denotes that it "belongs to" the bank. Thus, riparia means 'growing on the banks'.

A wide variety of common names exist for the plant. In English it has been referred to as creeping croftonweed, mistflower, river-eupatorium, spreading snakeroot, and William Taylor. In KwaZulu-Natal, it may be called mistblom. In Hawaii, the plant is commonly referred to as hāmākua pāmakani. The term pāmakani means "windblown" in the Hawaiian language, referring to the way its seeds are naturally dispersed.

== Description ==
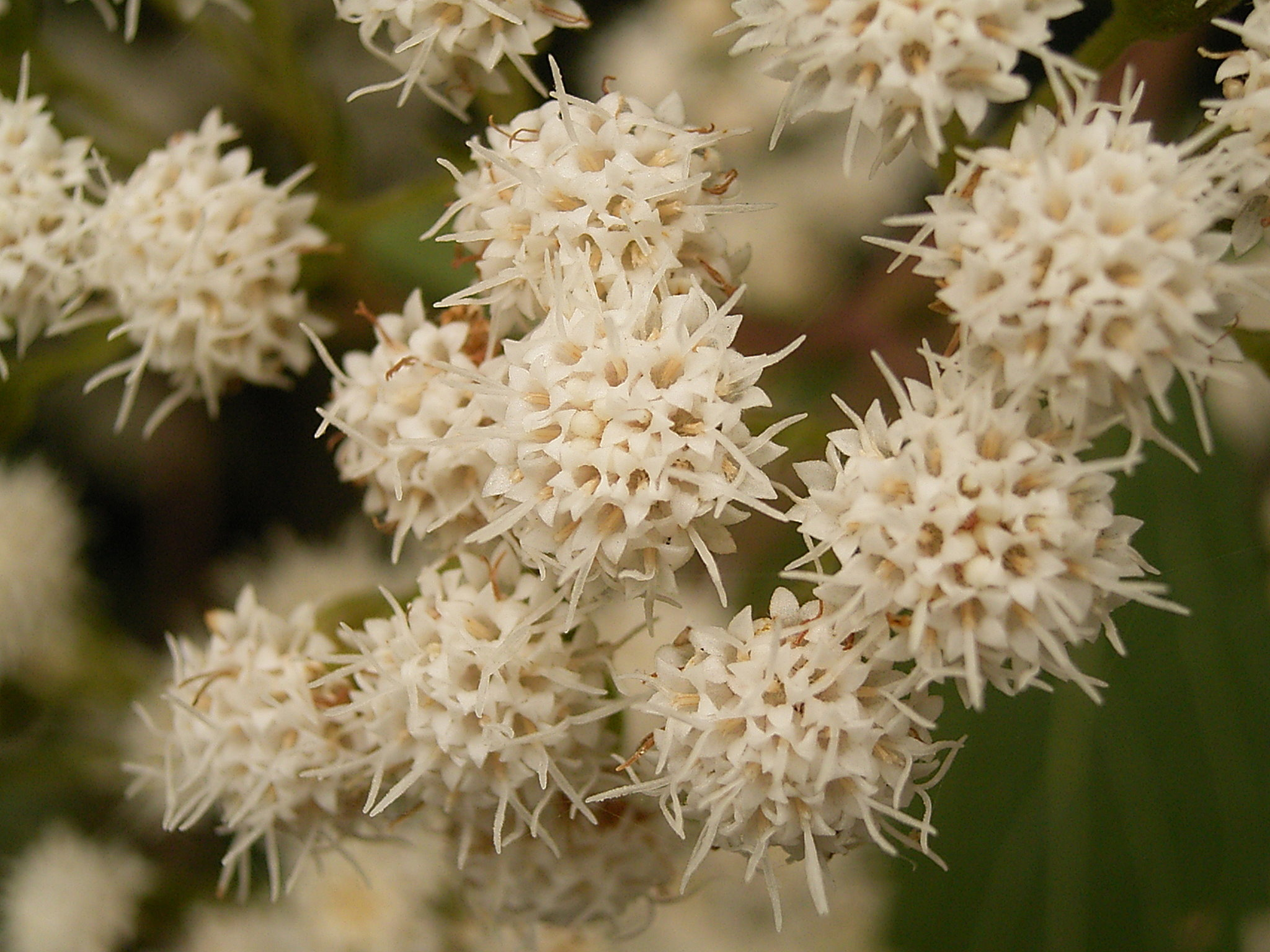
Flowers of A. riparia on La Palma, Canary Islands.

Mistflower is a low growing, sprawling perennial herb that may grow up to 1 meter in height in some climates. The species has a fibrous rootstock and its stems are often woody and covered in purple hairs. The stems may produce additional roots if they contact the ground.

The serrated leaves on average reach 7.5 cm long and 2.5 cm wide and taper at each end. The leaves form in opposing pairs which are coarsely serrated except near the base. The species is related to and closely resembles Ageratina adenophora. However, its distinctive serrated leaves may be used to distinguish mistflower from A. adenophora. The white flowers are also similar in appearance to A. adenphora. The flowers are white with dense heads at the ends of the branches. Mistflower buds from July until August, and may flower from August through March in some climates. Its seeds are black, slender, angular, 2 mm long, with fine white hairs at the tip. They are dispersed by wind and flowing water. Mature plants can produce around 10,000 to 100,000 seeds per year.

== Distribution and invasiveness ==
Mistflower is native to western Mexico. In its natural habitat the flower occurs sparsely and may even be considered endangered. Specimens were originally collected from the canyon of El Mirador, Mexico in 1857 for use as an ornamental plant. It was then brought back to Germany by Jean Jules Linden. From Linden's specimen, mistflower was introduced to many parts of the globe as an ornamental plant during the late 19th and early 20th centuries.

Outside of its natural habitat, the species spread quickly. It has become naturalized in many regions, including parts of South Africa, tropical Asia, Oceania, Macronesia, Madagascar, the Mascarenes, Hawaii, and Peru. Mistflower has become especially invasive in tropical and warm temperate climates. In these regions, the species can form dense underbrush. The branches of mistflower plants may intertwine with each other, creating a blanket effect which out-competes native flora and prevents indigenous species from propagating because of the lack of sunlight. In Sri Lanka, for example, it chokes out native plants in the country's mountain and cloud forests, and in pastures, roadsides, barren areas and bushlands of other places where it has been introduced with often disastrous effects. There is evidence that mistflower's decaying plant matter further inhibits the germination of native flora as it produces allelopathic compounds in decomposition that limit soil nutrients. It also adversely affects grazing pastures, as it can be toxic to horses and is often avoided by grazing stock.

Outside of its natural habitat, mistflower is often found in temperate pastoral areas and wetlands. The species grows in either sun or shade, but prefers higher levels of light found in marginal habitats: at the edge of forests and on streambanks. It thrives in warm and humid habitats, especially subtropical and tropical forests. Mistflower is tolerant to most soils, variable humidity levels, shade, and is resilient to damage from grazing.

== Control ==
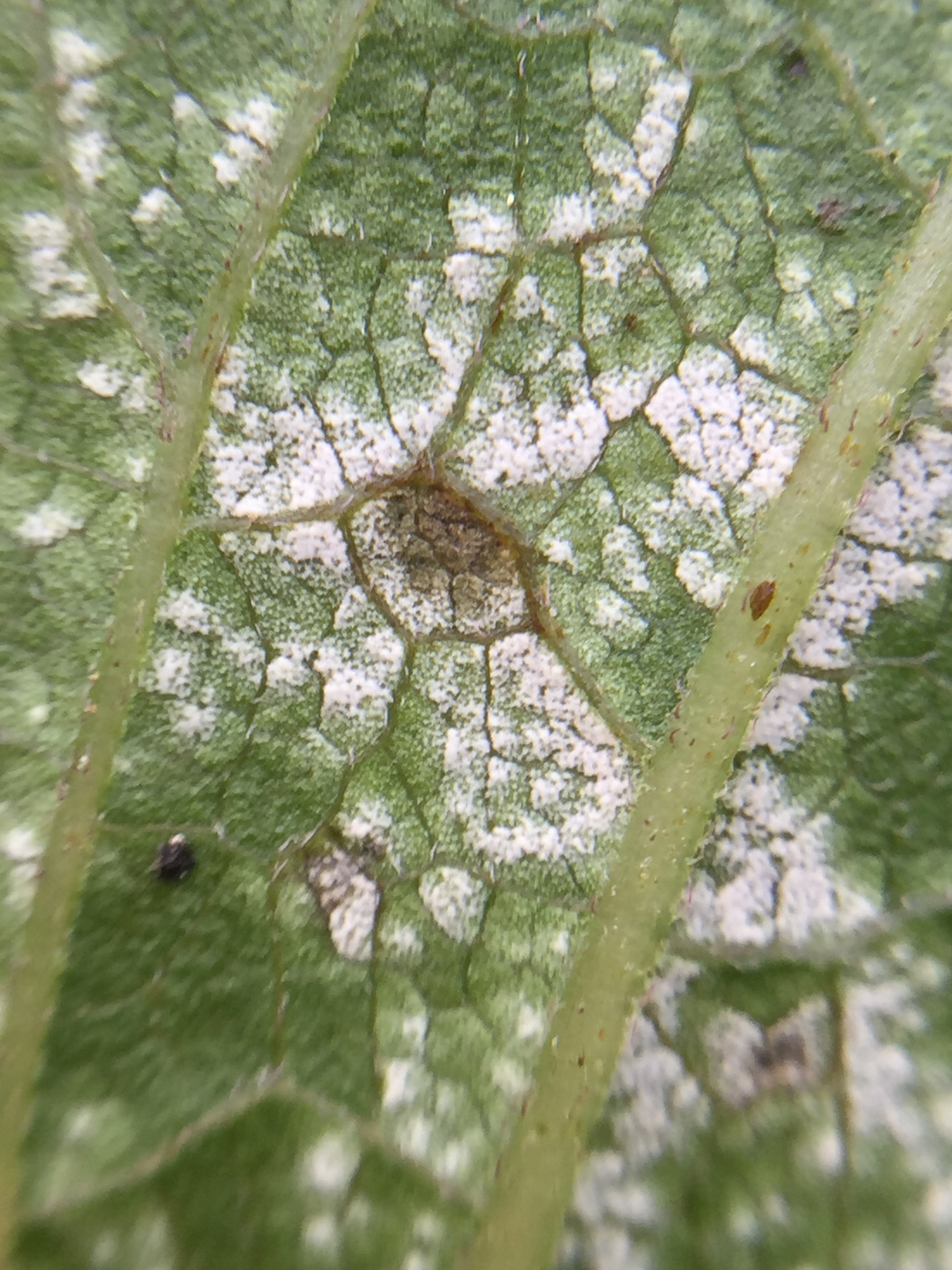
Close-up of the underside of a leaf infected by Entyloma ageratinae in Auckland.

Because of mistflower's broadly invasive nature, a variety of methods to control its spread have been developed by various countries since the mid-20th century. Mechanical measures are often employed against the plant, such as attempts to uproot areas overtaken by the plant. A variety of herbicides are currently employed against A. riparia, including: dicamba, glyphosate, metsulfuron, aminopyralid, metsulfuron-methyl, triclopyr, fluroxypyr, picloram, and aminopyralid.

=== Biological control agents ===
A number of biological control agents have been identified for use against A. riparia in regions where the species is invasive. These include, the gall fly Procecidochares alani, the plume moth Hellinsia beneficus, and the smut fungus Entyloma ageratinae. All of these species damage existing plants or otherwise inhibit its ability to propagate.

Entyloma ageratinae, a smut fungus, has been one of the most successful agents employed against the species. The species of fungus is commonly known as mist flower smut as it is highly specific to mist flower plants. In 1974, specimens of E. ageratinae were intentionally collected from mistflower plants in Jamaica, where it was noticed that mistflower was not as invasive as other regions with a similar climate. After a number of host range studies, proved that the pathogen only posed a threat to mistflower plants, the fungus was released at three sites on Oahu in 1975. One of these sites saw the area previously covered by mistflower drop from ~75% to less than 1% within 9 months, allowing for indigenous plants to reemerge. Following the fungus' proven success in several other inoculations were made at other sites throughout Hawaii. The pathogen spread quickly, especially in moist areas of the islands. After the pathogen's success in Hawaii, E. ageratinae was introduced at nine sites in New Zealand in 1998. The fungus quickly spread across the islands, quickly infecting an estimated 60% of live mistflower leaves.

Hellinsia beneficus, a plume moth from Mexico, was collected for the control of A. riparia because its larvae feed on the species' leaves. Unsuccessful attempts were made to introduce the species to Hawaii in 1959 and 1965. The moth was successfully introduced in Hawaii in 1973 when a total of approximately 1525 specimens were released at Mt. Kaala and Kona. The moth prefers higher altitudes and has rarely been observed below 1500 ft. by researchers in Hawaii. However, the moth has been effective in controlling A. riparia by damaging its leaves at elevations between 1500 ft and 4000 ft.

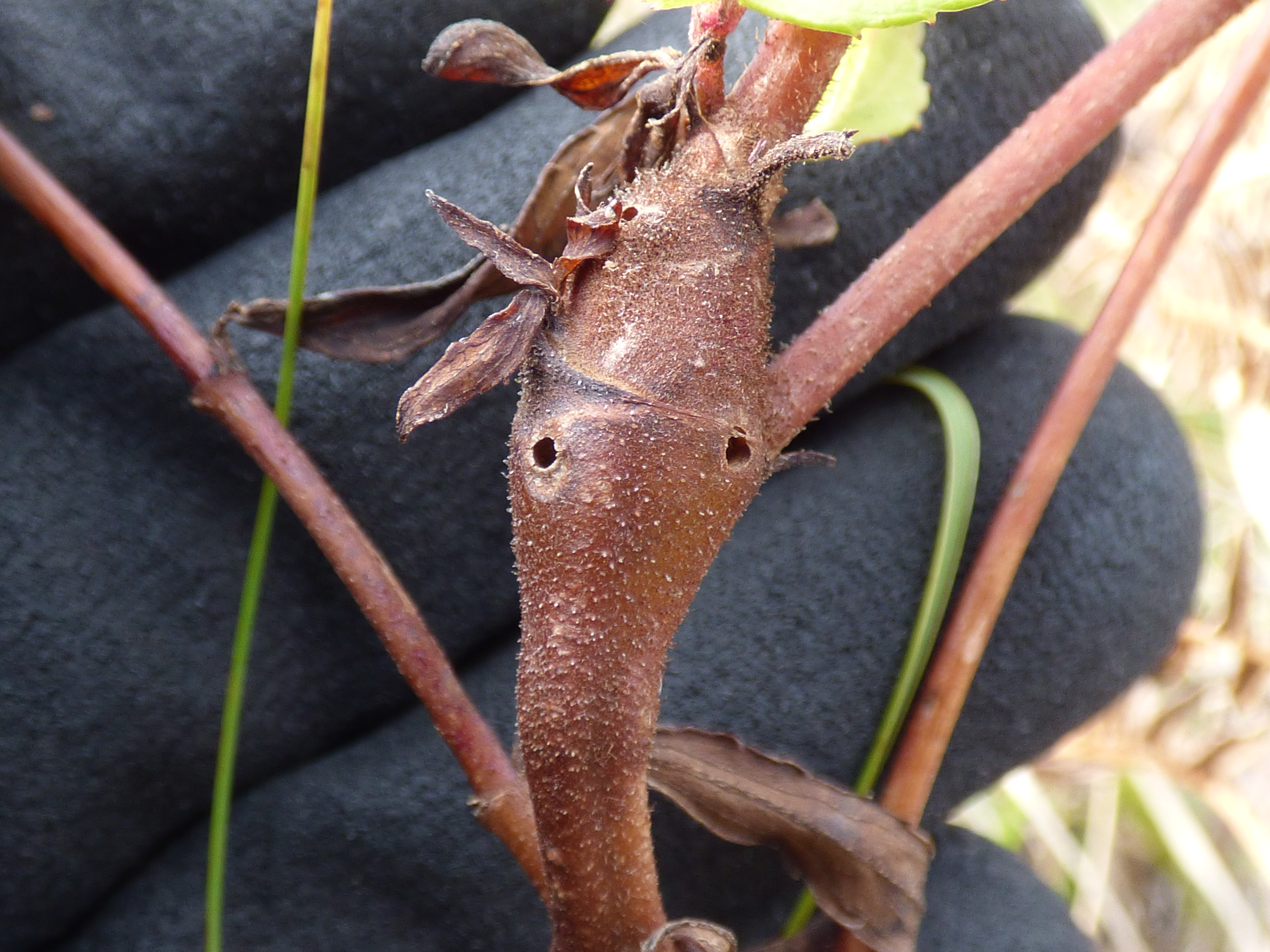
Stem galls caused by Procecidochares alani on Maui, Hawaii.

Procecidochares alani, a gall fly, spends its larval stage within the stem of mistflower plants, causing the formation of a bulbous gall at the top of the stem. This gall slows the plant's growth and inhibits its ability to compete with surrounding flora. The species is highly specific to the mistflower plant and poses little threat to other flora. Specimens were collected from Mexico by William Rose in 1973 as a potential biocontrol agent to be used in Hawaii. The fly was first released at Kona in 1974, followed by several other locations on the island of Hawaii. Together, the moth P. alani and the fly H. beneficus have helped control mistflower populations in high altitude areas of Hawaii where the smut fungus E. ageratina has not already devastated the population. Following the success of P. alani in controlling mistflower in Hawaii, the species was introduced to Australia in 1987 and to New Zealand in 2001. In Australia, P. alani, but failed to establish itself as a biocontrol agent as it was soon effected by native parasitoid wasps. The species had greater success in New Zealand.

A total of 11,630 flies were released in New Zealand across 34 sites in 2001. Compared to E. ageratinae, which had been released in New Zealand two years prior, P. alani had a more limited effect. The gall fly population did grow exponentially at release sites, but was comparatively slow to spread across New Zealand. The gall fly, however, has been proven to be more effective at targeting mistflower plants in dry areas, while the fungus E. ageratinae prefers moist habitats. The two species are therefore most effective acting together to control mistflower populations.

== Uses ==
Mistflower has most commonly been used as an ornamental plant. It may also be harvested for use as a tanning agent. In some regions, it is used for the stabilization of embankments and for partitioning land.

Near the village of Sangau in India where the species is known as Hlo-thar, there is evidence of the use of the plant's dried leaves and flowers to prepare an herbal tea, taken to reduce blood pressure and blood sugar.

The production of a methanol extract using the aerial part of the plant has revealed that the plants contain the antifungal compound methylripariochromene. Research into the antifungal aspects of mistflower suggest that its components may be exploited to create a fungicide able to control Colletotruchum musae, the cause of banana anthracnose disease.
