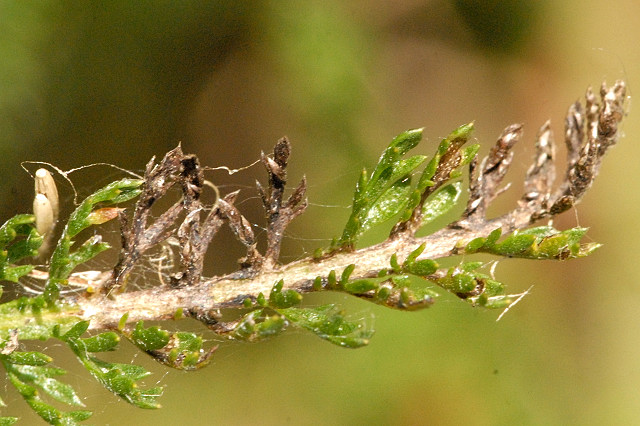
- Entyloma achilleae from Commanster, Belgium

Scientific classification
- Kingdom: Fungi
- Division: Basidiomycota
- Class: Exobasidiomycetes
- Order: Entylomatales
- Family: Entylomataceae
- Genus: Entyloma de Bary (1874)

Type species
- Entyloma microsporum (Unger) J.Schröt. (1874)

= Entyloma =

Genus of fungi

Entyloma is a genus of smut fungi in the family Entylomataceae. The genus was described by Anton de Bary in 1874. A 2008 estimates places about 180 species in the genus. The anamorph form of Entyloma is Entylomella.

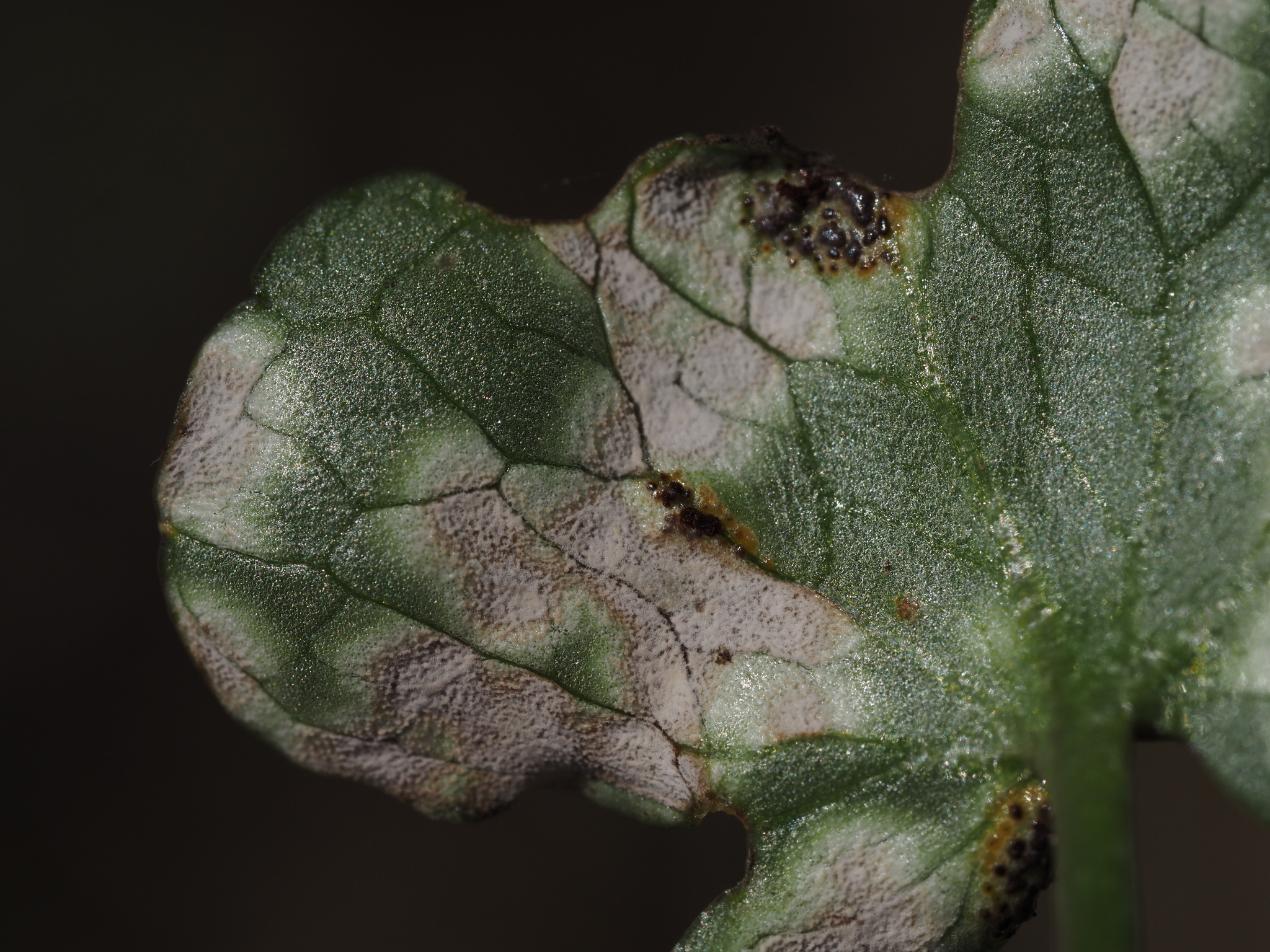
Conidiophores of Entyloma ficariae on the underside of a leaf of Ficaria verna.

== Species ==
- E. acanthocephali
- E. achilleae
- E. aeschynomenis
- E. ageratinae
- E. agoseridis
- E. aldamae
- E. alopecurivorum
- E. amaranthi
- E. ambrosiae-maritimae
- E. ameghinoi
- E. anadelphiae
- E. anceps
- E. antennariae
- E. aposeridis
- E. aquaticum
- E. arctothecae
- E. arctotis
- E. aristolochiae
- E. armoraciae
- E. arnaudianum
- E. arnicae
- E. arnicale
- E. arnoseridis
- E. asteris-alpini
- E. asteris-sericei
- E. asterisci
- E. asterisci-maritimi
- E. atlanticum
- E. australe
- E. bavaricum
- E. bellidiastri
- E. bellidis
- E. bergeniae
- E. blumeae
- E. boltoniae
- E. boraginis
- E. bracteanthae
- E. browalliae
- E. bullulum
- E. bupleuri
- E. calceolariae
- E. calendulae
- E. catananches
- E. catananchis
- E. ceratocephali
- E. chaenorrhini
- E. chelidonii
- E. chilense
- E. chloridis
- E. chrysosplenii
- E. cichorii
- E. circaeae
- E. cissigenum
- E. clintonianum
- E. collinsiae
- E. comaclinii
- E. commelinae
- E. compositarum
- E. convolvuli
- E. coreopsis
- E. corydalis
- E. cosmi
- E. costaricense
- E. crepidicola
- E. crepidis
- E. crepidis-rubrae
- E. crepidis-tectori
- E. cynoglossi
- E. cynosuri
- E. cyperi
- E. dahliae
- E. davisii
- E. debonianum
- E. deliliae
- E. deschampsiae
- E. diastateae
- E. doebbeleri
- E. dubium
- E. echinaceae
- E. echinopis
- E. ecuadorense
- E. ellisii
- E. erigerontis
- E. erodianum
- E. erodii
- E. eryngii
- E. eryngii-alpini
- E. eryngii-dichotomi
- E. eryngii-plani
- E. eryngii-tricuspidati
- E. eschscholziae
- E. espinosae
- E. eugeniarum
- E. eupatorii
- E. farisii
- E. fergussonii
- E. feurichii
- E. ficariae
- E. fimbriatum
- E. flavum
- E. floerkeae
- E. fragosoi
- E. frondosa
- E. fumariae
- E. fuscum
- E. gaillardiae
- E. gaillardianum
- E. galinsogae
- E. garcilassae
- E. garhadioli
- E. gaudinae
- E. gaudiniae
- E. geranti
- E. globigenum
- E. glyceriae
- E. grampiansis
- E. gratiolae
- E. guaraniticum
- E. guizotiae
- E. helenii
- E. helosciadii
- E. henningsiana
- E. henningsianum
- E. heterothecae
- E. hieracii
- E. hieroense
- E. holwayi
- E. hydrocotyles
- E. hypecoi
- E. hypochaeridis
- E. incertum
- E. jaegeriae
- E. kazachstanicum
- E. khandalensis
- E. korshinskyi
- E. kundmanniae
- E. lagerheimianum
- E. lagerheimii
- E. lapponicum
- E. lavrovianum
- E. leontices
- E. leontodontis
- E. lepachydis
- E. leucanthemi
- E. leucomaculans
- E. linariae
- E. lini
- E. lithophragmatis
- E. lobeliae
- E. ludwigianum
- E. madiae
- E. magnusii
- E. magocsyanum
- E. maireanum
- E. majewskii
- E. maroccanum
- E. martindalei
- E. matricariae
- E. meconopsidis
- E. medicaginis
- E. mediterraneum
- E. meliloti
- E. menispermi
- E. microsporum
- E. moniliferum
- E. montis-rainieri
- E. mundkurii
- E. myosuri
- E. mysorense
- E. nierenbergiae
- E. nigellae
- E. nigricans
- E. novae-zelandiae
- E. nubilum
- E. obionum
- E. occultum
- E. oenanthes
- E. oenotherae
- E. pachydermum
- E. pammelii
- E. paradoxum
- E. parietariae
- E. parthenii
- E. pastinacae
- E. pavlovii
- E. peninsulae
- E. peregrinum
- E. petuniae
- E. peullense
- E. phalaridis
- E. physalidis
- E. picridis
- E. plantaginis
- E. poae
- E. podospermi
- E. polygoni-amphibii
- E. polygoni-punctati
- E. polypogonis
- E. polysporum
- E. primulae
- E. pustulosum
- E. ranunculacearum
- E. ranunculi-repentis
- E. ranunculi-scelerati
- E. ranunculorum
- E. rhagadioli
- E. saccardoanum
- E. saniculae
- E. scalianum
- E. semenoviana
- E. serotinum
- E. sidae-rhombifoliae
- E. siegesbeckiae
- E. sonchi
- E. speciosum
- E. spectabile
- E. spegazzinii
- E. spilanthis
- E. sporoboli
- E. spragueanum
- E. sydowianum
- E. tagetesium
- E. tanaceti
- E. taraxaci
- E. terrieri
- E. thalictri
- E. thirumalacharii
- E. tichomirovii
- E. tolpidis
- E. tomilinii
- E. tozziae
- E. trigonellae
- E. ulei
- E. uliginis
- E. unamunoi
- E. urocystoides
- E. variabile
- E. veronicae
- E. verruculosum
- E. vignae
- E. vulpiae
- E. winteri
- E. wisconsiniense
- E. wroblewskii
- E. wyomingense
- E. xanthii
- E. xauense
- E. zacintha
- E. zinniae
