= Entylomella =

Scientific classification
- Domain: Eukaryota
- Kingdom: Fungi
- Division: Basidiomycota
- Class: Exobasidiomycetes
- Order: Entylomatales
- Family: Entylomataceae
- Genus: Entylomella; Höhn. (1924)

Type species
- Entylomella ranunculi (Bonord.) Cif. (1924)

Genus of fungi

Entylomella is a genus of smut fungi in the family Entylomataceae. The genus, which contains anamorph forms of Entyloma species, was circumscribed in 1924 by Franz Xaver Rudolf von Höhnel.

== Species ==
- Entylomella callitriches
- Entylomella chrysanthemi
- Entylomella circinans
- Entylomella ellisii
- Entylomella geranii
- Entylomella guaranitica
- Entylomella leontices
- Entylomella lobeliae
- Entylomella meliloti
- Entylomella microspora
- Entylomella oenotherae
- Entylomella oenotherae-biennis
- Entylomella pfaffii
- Entylomella premnicola
- Entylomella saussureae
- Entylomella schinziana
- Entylomella sidae-rhombifoliae
- Entylomella sii-latifolii
- Entylomella smarodsii
- Entylomella veronicae
- Entylomella veronicae-cymbalariae
- Entylomella veronicicola
- Entylomella winteri
