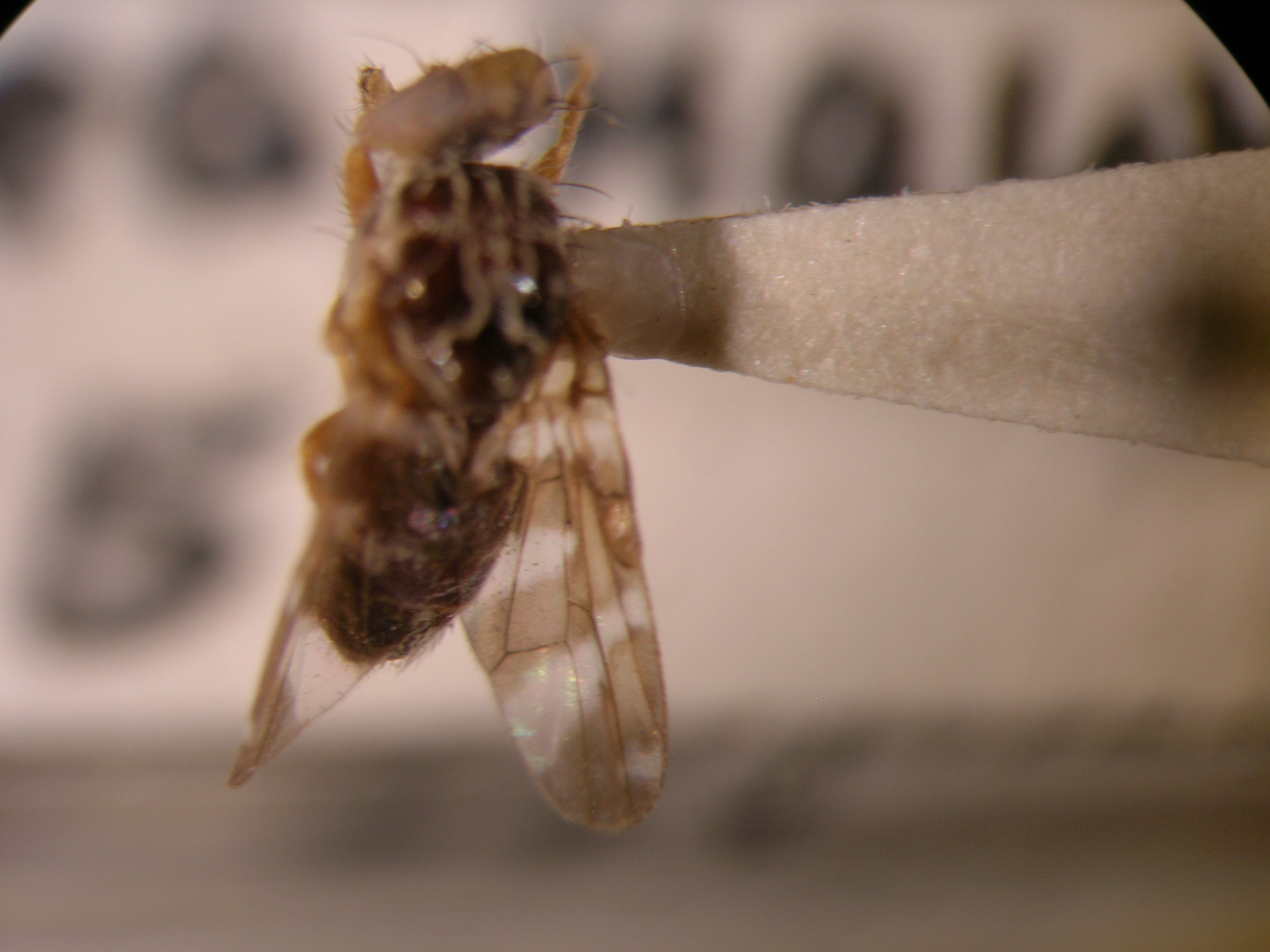
- Pinned P. alani from Onomea Hawaii.

Scientific classification
- Kingdom: Animalia
- Phylum: Arthropoda
- Class: Insecta
- Order: Diptera
- Family: Tephritidae
- Subfamily: Tephritinae
- Tribe: Cecidocharini
- Genus: Procecidochares
- Species: P. alani

Binomial name
- Procecidochares alani Steyskal, 1974

= Procecidochares alani =

Species of fly

Procecidochares alani is a species of tephritid or fruit flies in the genus Procecidochares.

== Distribution ==
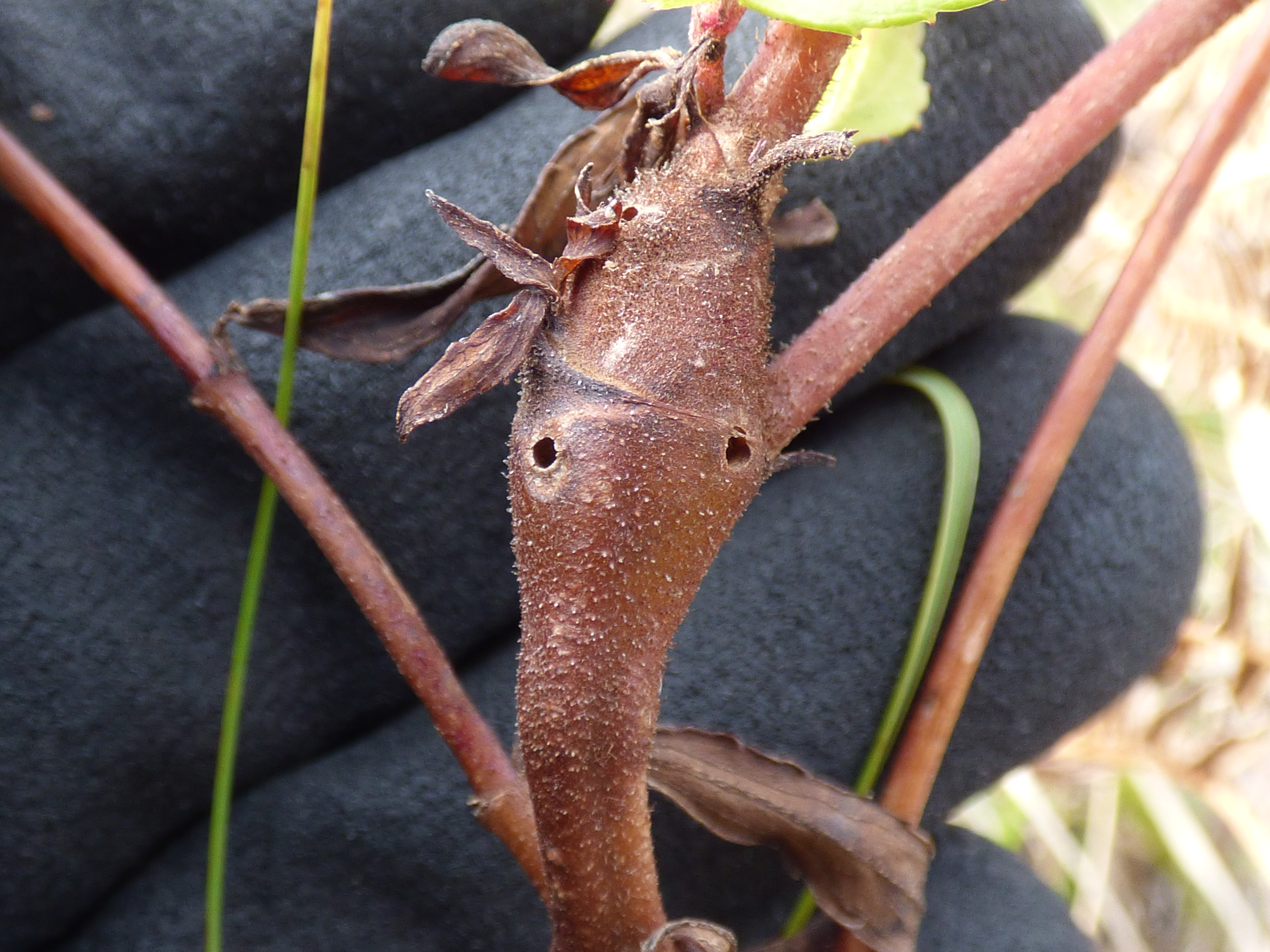
Stem gall of Ageratina riparia caused by P. alani in Hawaii.

The species is native to Mexico. Specimens have been introduced to Hawaii, New Zealand, and Australia as a biocontrol agent against Ageratina riparia. Larve of P. alani feed on the inside of the invasive plant, and cause stem galls to form, impeding growth.

P. alani was first introduced to Australia in 1987 as a biocontrol agent, but had limited success as it was soon effected by native parasitoid wasps.
