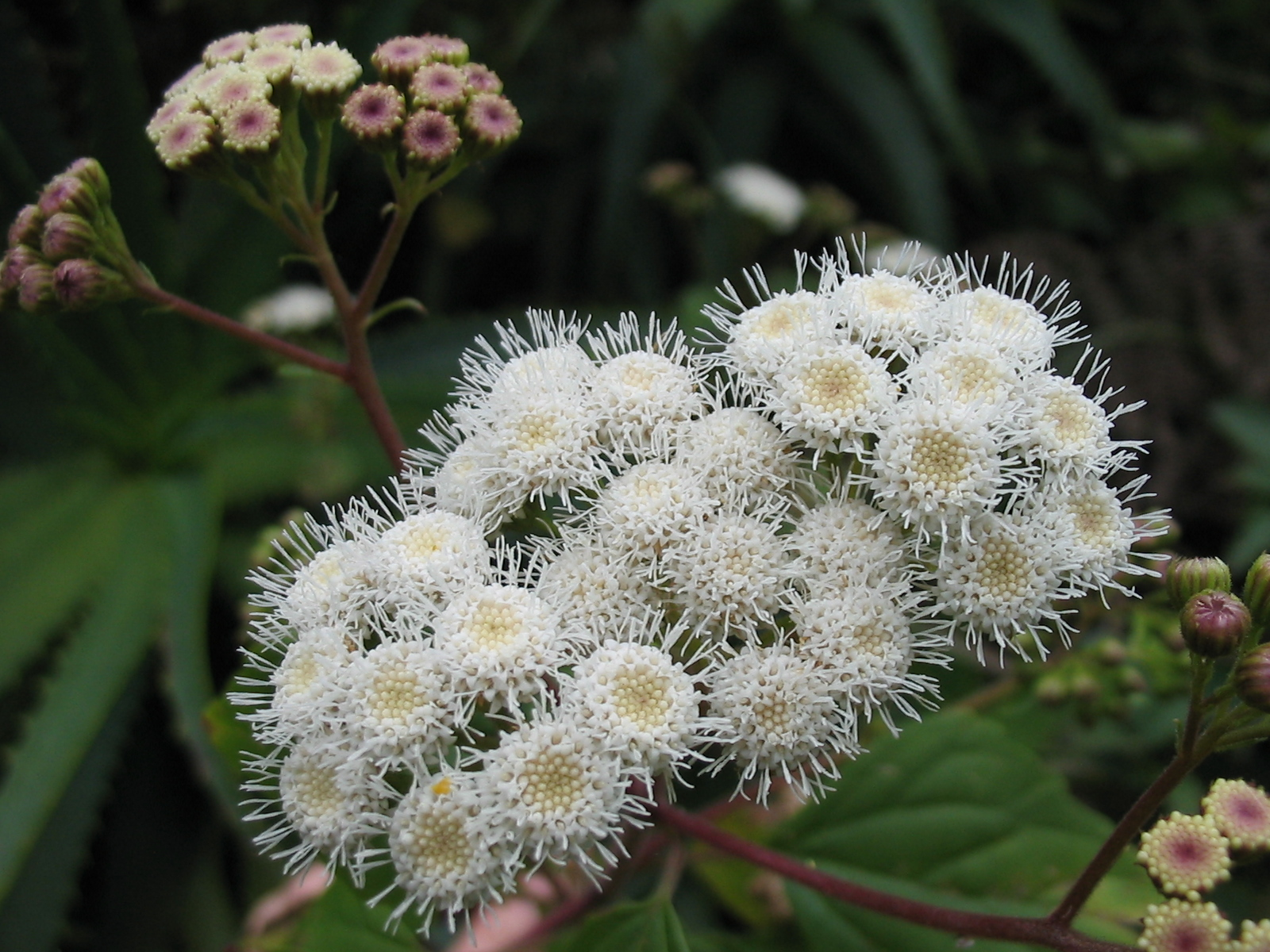
- Crofton weed

Scientific classification
- Kingdom: Plantae
- Clade: Tracheophytes
- Clade: Angiosperms
- Clade: Eudicots
- Clade: Asterids
- Order: Asterales
- Family: Asteraceae
- Genus: Ageratina
- Species: A. adenophora

Binomial name
- Ageratina adenophora (Spreng.) King & H.Rob.

Synonyms
- Eupatorium adenophorum Spreng.; Eupatorium glandulosum Michx.; Eupatorium glandulosum Hort. ex Kunth; Eupatorium pasadenense Parish

= Ageratina adenophora =

Crofton weed

Weedy species of flowering plant

Ageratina adenophora (synonym Eupatorium adenophorum), commonly known as Crofton weed, is a species of flowering plant in the family Asteraceae native to Mexico. Originally grown as an ornamental plant, it has become invasive into farmland and bushland worldwide. It is toxic to horses, which develop a respiratory disease known as Numinbah horse sickness after eating it.

== Taxonomy ==
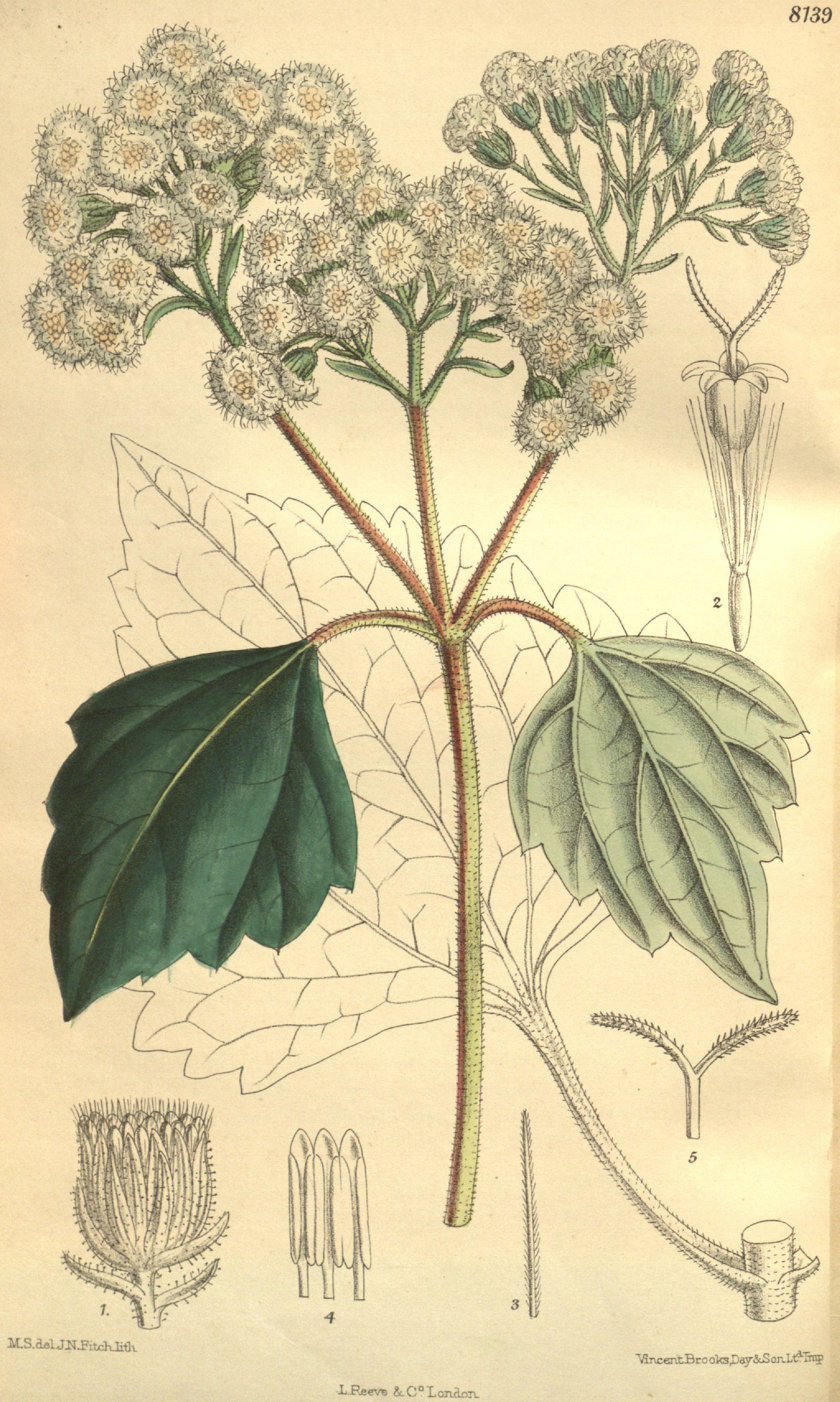
Illustration showing plant details.

Ageratina adenophora is known by many common names, including eupatory, sticky eupatorium, sticky snakeroot, thoroughwort, and Mexican devil.

== Description ==
Ageratina adenophora is a perennial herbaceous shrub that may grow to 1 or 2 metres (3.3 or 6.6 ft) high. It has opposite trowel-shaped serrated leaves that are 6–10 cm (2.4–3.9 in) long by 3–6 cm (1.2–2.4 in) in width. The small compound flowers occur in late spring and summer, and are found in clusters at the end of branches. Each flowerhead is up to 0.5 cm in the diameter and creamy white. Each small flower is followed by a small brown seed with a white feathery "parachute" that can be dispersed by the wind similar to a dandelion.

== Distribution and habitat ==
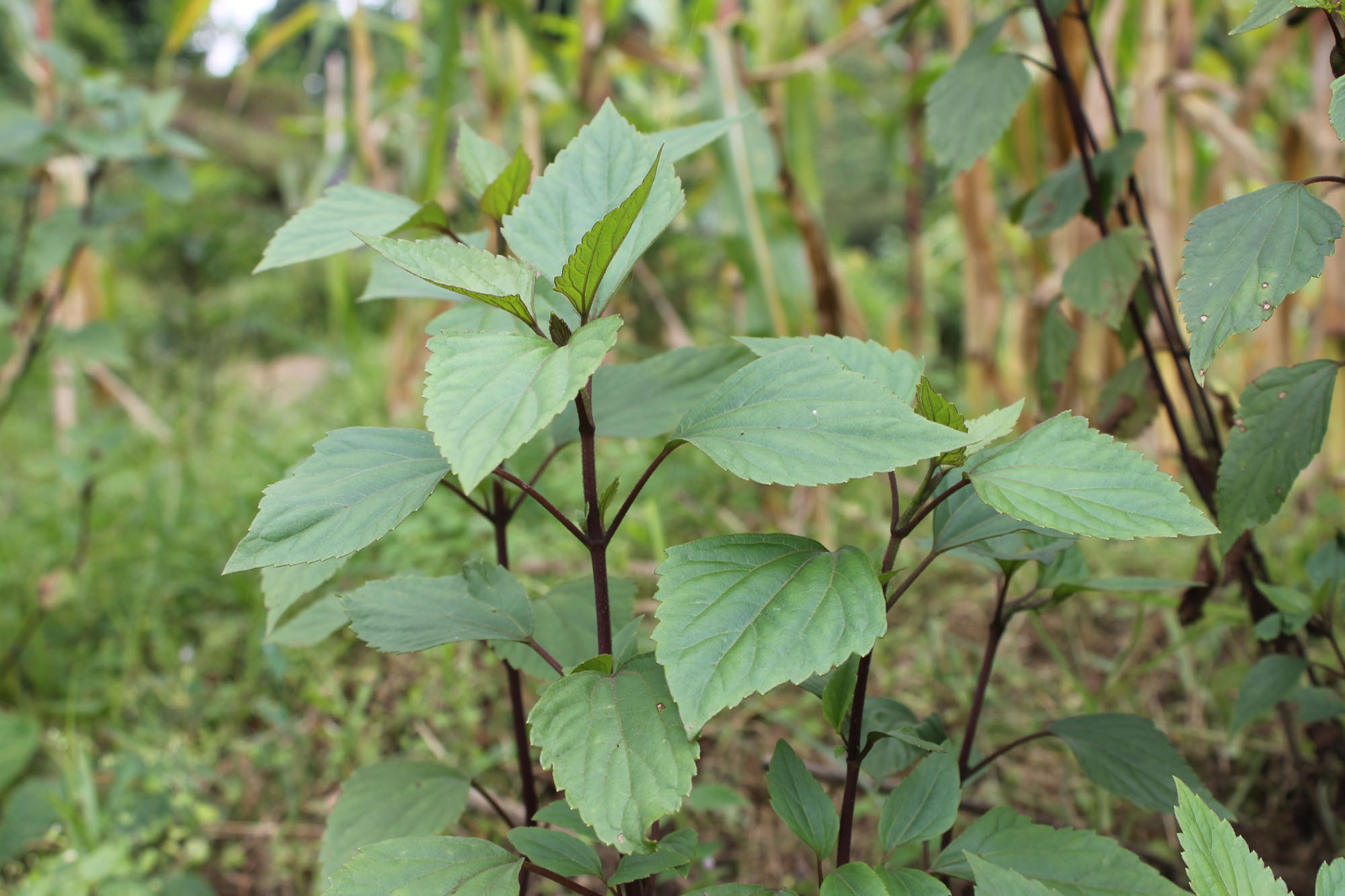
Ageratina adenophora (Nepali: कालीमुन्टे, romanized: kalimunte) plant found in Panchkhal Valley, Nepal

It is native to Mexico, but it is known in many other parts of the world as an introduced species and often a noxious weed. It has caused great economic loss in agriculture in southwestern China, and is threatening the native biodiversity there. It was first inadvertently introduced to Yunnan around 1940, and its rapid spread is due in part to its allelopathic competition with other plant species. It also a weed in Australia, where it was introduced to Sydney in 1904. It has spread along the coastline of New South Wales and southern Queensland. It is rated a Class 4 Noxious Weed under the NSW Noxious Weeds Act of 1993.

Ageratina adenophora has also spread in Hawaii and the mainland United States, where it is recognised as a weed in ten states of the South and Southwest.

Elsewhere it is an invasive species in many tropical and subtropical countries, including northeastern India, China, Sri Lanka, Nigeria, Southeast Asia, Australia, New Zealand, the Pacific Islands, the Canary Islands, some islands of Cabo Verde (it has been spotted on the island of Brava), Portugal (including the Azores and Madeira islands) and South Africa.

The plant can spread vegetatively (i.e., the stems can sprout roots and grow upon contact with earth). The seed is also carried by the wind or water and readily colonises disturbed areas, such as fields and areas near human habitation. Seed may also be transported on animals and in soil.

=== Galls ===
This species is host to the following insect induced gall Procecidochares utilis an Eupatorium Gall Fly that produces a stem gall (see image below).

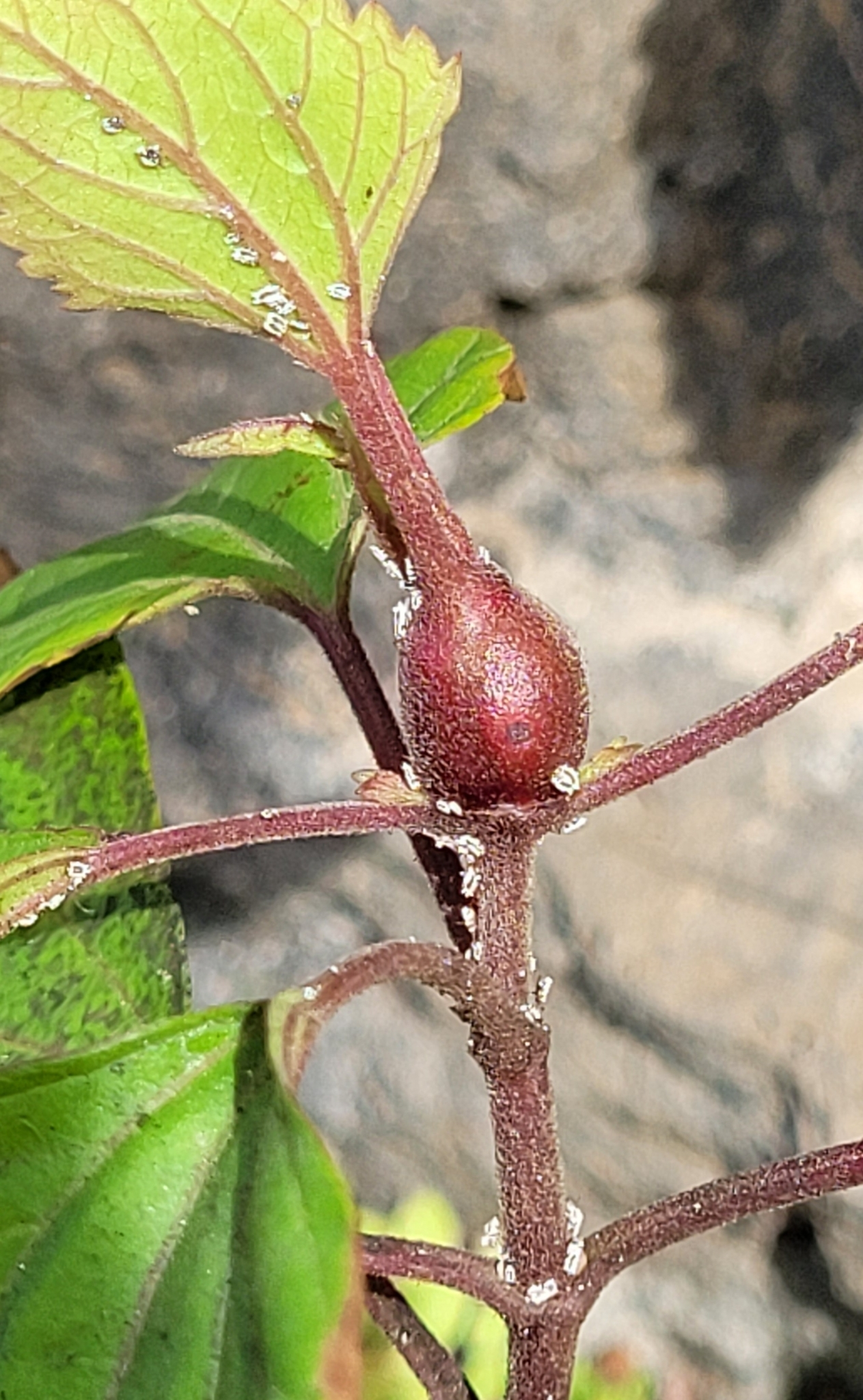
Eupatorium Gall Fly

== Toxicity ==
Crofton weed is toxic to livestock. Ongoing consumption of crofton weed by horses leads to chronic lung disease, known as Numinbah Horse Sickness or Tallebudgera Horse Disease in northern New South Wales and Queensland. Outbreaks occurred in Hawaii in the 1920s, and subsequently in eastern Australia and Northland in New Zealand. There are reports of farms losing all their horses to the condition. It is typified by impaired ability to work or exercise and emphysema. Pathological findings include pulmonary interstitial fibrosis and alveolar epithelisation.

== Etymology ==
Ageratina is derived from Greek meaning 'un-aging', in reference to the flowers keeping their color for a long time. This name was used by Dioscorides for a number of different plants.
