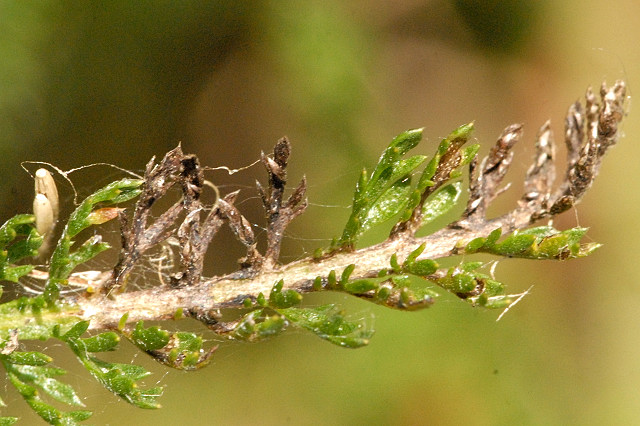
- Entyloma achilleae from Commanster, Belgium

Scientific classification
- Kingdom: Fungi
- Division: Basidiomycota
- Class: Exobasidiomycetes
- Subclass: Exobasidiomycetidae
- Order: Entylomatales; R.Bauer & Oberw. (1997)

Type genus
- Entyloma de Bary (1874)

Genera
- Entyloma; Entylomella

= Entylomatales =

Order of fungi

The Entylomatales are an order of smut fungi in the class Exobasidiomycetes. A monotypic order, it consists of a single family, the Entylomataceae. Both the family and order were circumscribed in 1997.
