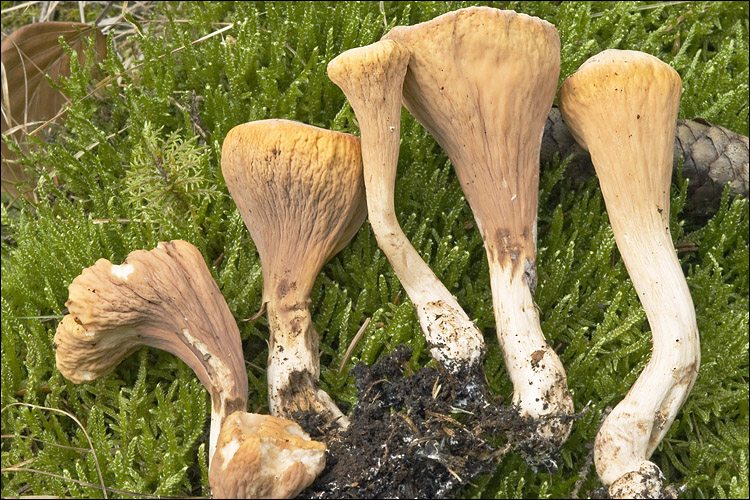

Scientific classification
- Kingdom: Fungi
- Division: Basidiomycota
- Class: Agaricomycetes
- Order: Gomphales
- Family: Clavariadelphaceae
- Genus: Clavariadelphus
- Species: C. truncatus

Binomial name
- Clavariadelphus truncatus (Quél.) Donk

Synonyms
- Clavariadelphus borealis V.L. Wells & Kempton; Clavariadelphus lovejoyae V.L. Wells & Kempton; Clavariadelphus truncatus var. lovejoyae (V.L. Wells & Kempton) Corner; Craterellus pistillaris Fr. Trombetta pistillaris (Fr.) Kuntze; Clavaria truncata Lovejoy

= Clavariadelphus truncatus =

Species of mushroom

- Mycological characteristics
- Smooth hymenium
- No distinct cap
- Hymenium attachment is irregular or not applicable
- Stipe is bare
- Spore print is ochre
- Ecology is mycorrhizal
- Edibility is edible or choice

Clavariadelphus truncatus, commonly known as the truncate club coral, truncated club, or club coral, is a species of mushroom. It is a member of the basidiomycete fungi family Gomphaceae.

== Description ==
The species has a yellow-orange fruiting body in the shape of a club with a flat cap. The flesh is white, thin, and hollow at the top. The vertical side of the fruiting body normally has folds and wrinkles, but can be smooth. The spores are smooth and their spore print is pale yellow to ochre.

The mushroom has a pleasant odor and a sweet taste.

=== Chemistry ===
C. truncatus can bioaccumulate significant amounts of zinc, and radioactive caesium-137.

=== Similar species ===
Although one field guide says that it is unlikely that anyone would confuse the mushroom with another species, the yellow chanterelle is distantly related to the mushroom and looks nearly the same, except for the ridges and cross-veined hymenium. In North America, C. pallidoincarnatus (found in the West) and C. unicolor (in the East) are similar, as is C. ligula. Clavariadelphus pistillaris is also similar, but the top is not flat. Additionally, Macrotyphula fistulosa is tall and skinny, and Neolecta has a bright yellow head.

== Habitat and distribution ==
The mushroom's habitat is in coniferous forests from summer to autumn. The mushroom is a common species. The species is found at a high elevation and is widely distributed.

== Uses ==
The mushroom is edible and has a sweet taste. Old mushrooms may be spongy and soft inside. The species is high in nutrition and can be used for cooking. One field guide says that the mushroom is one of the best to eat and has a sweet flavor that is especially appealing to some people. David Arora writes that the mushroom can be sautéed and served for dessert.

=== Medicine ===
The mushroom contains clavaric acid, which has been shown to reduce the rate of tumor development when given to mice. Clavaric acid interferes with farnesyltransferase, an enzyme implicated in tumorigenesis, which suggests that clavaric acid may have therapeutic value in the treatment of certain cancers. It has been reported that the mushrooms have significant antioxidant activity.

== See also ==
- Medicinal mushrooms
