= Ramaria flavosaponaria =

Scientific classification
- Kingdom: Fungi
- Division: Basidiomycota
- Class: Agaricomycetes
- Order: Gomphales
- Family: Gomphaceae
- Genus: Ramaria
- Subgenus: Laeticolora
- Species: R. flavosaponaria

Binomial name
- Ramaria flavosaponaria R.H. Petersen 1986

Synonyms
- Ramaria aquafaba; Ramaria aurea sensu mihi; Ramaria flavo-saponaria R.H. Petersen 1986

Species of fungus

Ramaria flavosaponaria
- Mycological characteristics
- Smooth hymenium
- No distinct cap
- Hymenium attachment is not applicable
- Stipe is bare
- Spore print is ochre to buff
- Ecology is mycorrhizal
- Edibility is unknown

Ramaria flavosaponaria is a species of coral fungus in the family Gomphaceae. It is found in the mountains of eastern North America from Georgia and Tennessee to Nova Scotia.

== Names ==
The specific epithet is from the flavo ('yellow') and saponaria ('soapy'), both of which are distinguishing features of the mushroom. The name was originally published as Ramaria flavo-saponaria, including a hyphen. However, this is considered erroneous by the International Code of Nomenclature for algae, fungi, and plants, so the proper orthography is Ramaria flavosaponaria.

Before being formally described in 1986 by Ron Petersen, the species was labelled in scientific collections under various names. Ramaria aurea sensu mihi was used for its resemblance to the European Ramaria aurea. It was also sometimes labeled Ramaria aquafaba, at least as early as 1969, predating the 2015 coinage of the term aquafaba in an unrelated culinary usage. This term possibly relates to the use of some yellow species of Ramaria (possibly including R. flavosaponaria) to make flavorful broth. cooked R. flavosaponaria has a beany flavor, so this 'bean water' (Latin aqua + faba) likely led to the early R. aquafaba name.

== Description ==
Ramaria flavosaponaria has fruiting bodies up to 8 by 12 centimetres (3 in × 4 1/2 in) in size that are broadly obovate to circular in shape and cespitose or scattered. The irregularly shaped stipe grows up to 3 cm × 1.5 cm (1 1/4 in × 1/2 in) with much aborted branching, giving an appearance like cauliflower. The flesh is white to yellow, does not bruise, but has a soapy texture without being gelatinous. The above-ground parts are weakly vinescent (turning to a red wine color) around soil particles. The flesh is brittle whether dried or fresh.

The odor of fresh specimens is fabaceous (bean-like), which becomes like fenugreek upon drying. The taste is described as moderately fabaceous, but it is not known if the species is edible. A Colorado couple suffered gastrointestinal distress and cramps from a mushroom similar to the European R. aurea, but if this was R. flavosaponaria or another species is uncertain.

The species tests positive with pyrogallol. It is moderately positive in response to ferric chloride. Tincture of guaiac is negative on the branch sections but weakly positive on the surface of the stipe. Ammonium hydroxide and potassium hydroxide cause bleaching. Testing with melzer's reagent is negative.

The trama hyphae of the upper branches are no bigger than 7 μm in diameter and appear glassy, are hyaline, and lack clamp connections. The areas near the septa are inflated up to 15 μm and are ornamented delicately. Gloeoplerous hyphae are not present. The hymenium is thickening, with clavate basidia that also lack clamp connections.

The subcylindrical or narrowly ovate spores are 3.6–5.4 × 7.2–11.2 μm with roughened profiles. The spores have walls up to 0.3 μm thick, with ornamentation of low warts and meandering, reticulate, and complex cyanophilous ridges. Spore prints are cinnamon buff.

=== Similar species ===
Ramaria flavosaponaria is easily distinguished from related mushrooms by the brilliant gold color, the large number of aborted branchlets, a surface that feels slippery, a lack of clamp connections, and a complex spore ornamentation. It is sometimes confused with R. aurea, which only grows in Europe. Ramaria stuntzii also lacks clamps, has small spores, and aborted branchlets, but is a bright red color and not slippery to the touch. There is also a similar Ramaria species in Nova Scotia that is bronze-colored and also not slippery. Macroscopically, R. primulina is quite similar, but produces larger spores, has clamps, and flesh that is more gelatinous than soapy.

== Ecology ==
The species forms ectomycorrhizal relationships with Fagus sylvatica (European beech). It has been found growing under Tsuga canadensis (eastern hemlock) and Quercus (oak) trees.
