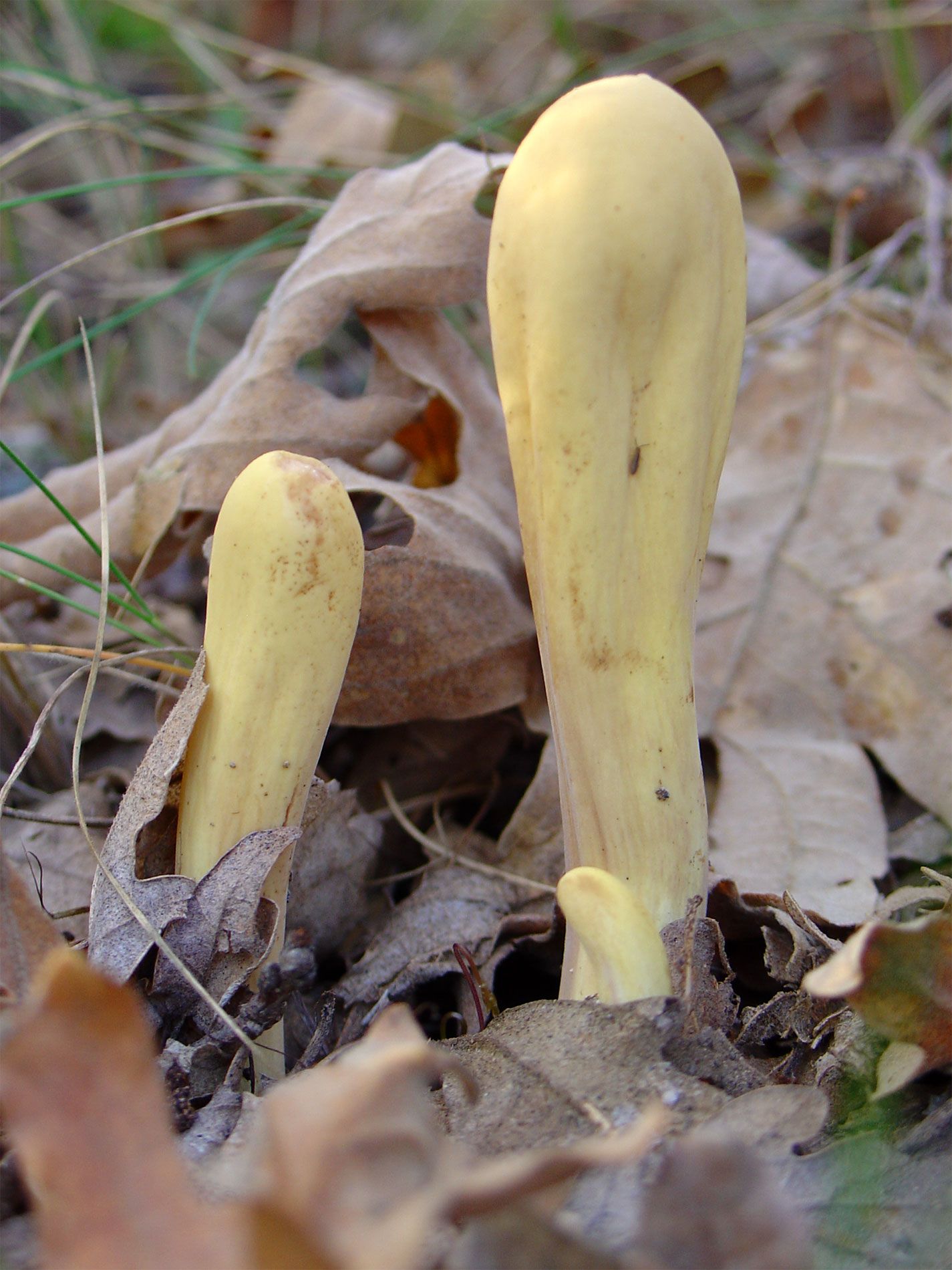

Scientific classification
- Kingdom: Fungi
- Division: Basidiomycota
- Class: Agaricomycetes
- Order: Gomphales
- Family: Clavariadelphaceae
- Genus: Clavariadelphus
- Species: C. pistillaris

Binomial name
- Clavariadelphus pistillaris (L.) Donk (1933)

Synonyms
- Clavaria pistillaris L.

= Clavariadelphus pistillaris =

Species of fungus

Clavariadelphus pistillaris
- Mycological characteristics
- Smooth hymenium
- No distinct cap
- Hymenium attachment is not applicable
- Stipe is bare
- Spore print is white
- Ecology is mycorrhizal
- Edibility is edible or edible, but unpalatable

Clavariadelphus pistillaris, commonly known as the common club coral, is a rare species of mushroom of the family Gomphaceae native to Europe and North America.

== Taxonomy ==
The western North American variety is known as C. occidentalis.

== Description ==
The mat and wrinkled fruiting body has the shape of a club with a rounded top. Its length varies between 6 and 30 centimetres (2 1/2 and 12 in) and its width between 0.8 and 6 cm (1/4 and 2 1/4 in). The skin is red brown to ocher red, sometimes cinnamon brown with a lilac tint, turning brown when damaged. The spongy flesh is white. The spore print is pale yellow.

=== Similar species ===
Through its appearance it could be mistaken for C. truncatus, a species found in coniferous montane forests. C. subfastigiatus is also similar.

== Habitat and distribution ==
Native to Europe and North America.

== Uses ==
The species is recorded as being edible. There have been reports of the mushroom being a "nutraceutical and/or functional food" due to its high antioxidant activity and containing essential fatty acids.

According to one field guide, the americana variety of the species usually does not have enough flesh to make it worthwhile to eat.
