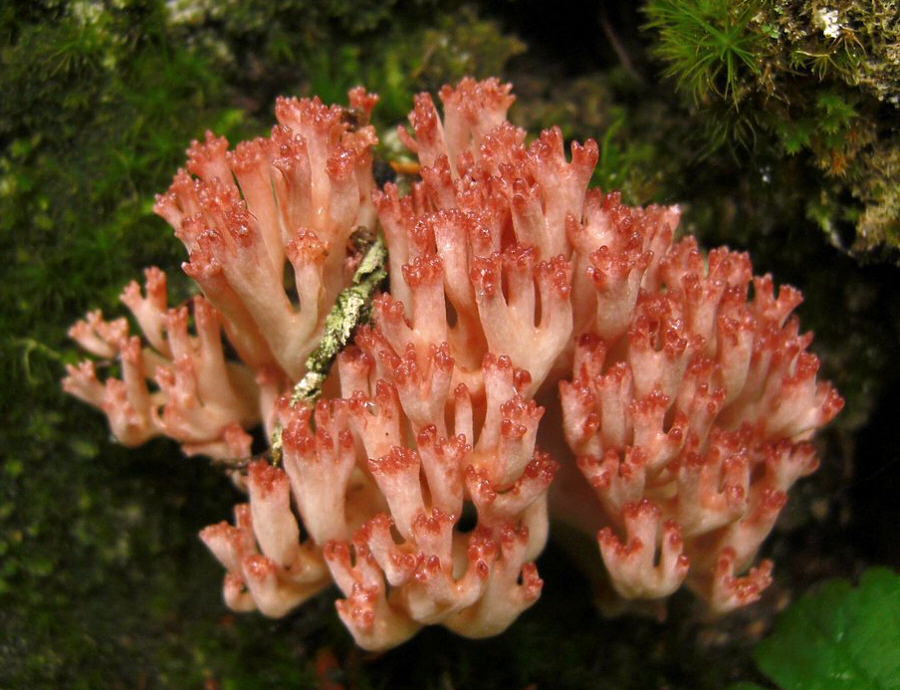

Scientific classification
- Kingdom: Fungi
- Division: Basidiomycota
- Class: Agaricomycetes
- Order: Gomphales
- Family: Gomphaceae
- Genus: Ramaria
- Species: R. botrytis

Binomial name
- Ramaria botrytis (Pers.) Ricken (1918)

Synonyms
- Clavaria botrytis Pers. (1797); Corallium botrytis (Pers.) G.Hahn (1883); Clavaria botrytis var. alba A.Pearson (1946)

= Ramaria botrytis =

Species of coral fungus in the family Gomphaceae

Ramaria botrytis
- Mycological characteristics
- Smooth hymenium
- No distinct cap
- Stipe is bare
- Spore print is yellow
- Ecology is mycorrhizal
- Edibility is edible but not recommended

Ramaria botrytis, commonly known as the clustered coral, the pink-tipped coral mushroom, or the cauliflower coral, is a species of coral fungus in the family Gomphaceae. The type species of the genus Ramaria, R. botrytis was first described scientifically in 1797 by mycologist Christiaan Hendrik Persoon.

The robust fruit body can grow up to 15 cm (6 in) in diameter and 20 cm (8 in) tall, and resembles some marine coral. Its dense branches, which originate from a stout, massive base, are swollen at the tips and divided into several small branchlets. The branches are initially whitish but age to buff or tan, with tips that are pink to reddish. The flesh is thick and white. The spores, yellowish in deposit, are ellipsoid, feature longitudinal striations, and measure about 13.8 by 4.7 micrometers. It resembles several species of coral fungi, some of which require microscopy to reliably identify.

A widely distributed species, it is found in North America, Australia, North Africa, central and eastern Europe, and Asia. The fungus is mycorrhizal with broadleaf trees, and fruits on the ground in wooded areas. The fruit bodies are edible and young specimens have a mild, fruity taste. Some authors warn of laxative effects in susceptible individuals. The fungus contains several chemical compounds with in vitro biological activity, and fruit bodies have antimicrobial activity against several species and strains of drug-resistant bacteria that cause disease in humans.

== Taxonomy ==
The species was first named as Clavaria botrytis in 1797 by Christian Hendrik Persoon. In 1821, Elias Magnus Fries sanctioned the genus name Clavaria, and treated Ramaria as a section of Clavaria. It was given its current name in 1918 by Adalbert Ricken. Obsolete historical synonyms include Gotthold Hahn's 1883 Corallium botrytis and Arthur Anselm Pearson's variety Clavaria botrytis var. alba, which is no longer recognized as an independent taxon. Currie Marr and Daniel Stuntz described the variety R. botrytis var. aurantiiramosa in their 1973 monograph of western Washington Ramaria; Edwin Schild and G. Ricci described variety compactospora from Italy in 1998. In 1950, E. J. H. Corner published George F. Atkinson's 1908 Clavaria holorubella as R. botrytis var. holorubella, but this taxon is now known as the independent species Ramaria holorubella.

The specific epithet botrytis is derived from the Greek word βότρυς (botrus) meaning "bunch of grapes". The species is commonly known as the "cauliflower coral", the "pink-tipped coral mushroom", or the "rosso coral". In the Cofre de Perote region of Veracruz, Mexico, R. botrytis is known by the local names escobea, meaning "broom", or pechuga, meaning "breast meat of chicken".

Ramaria botrytis was designated the type species of Ramaria in 1933 by Marinus Anton Donk. Modern molecular analysis indicates that Ramaria is a polyphyletic assemblage of species with clavarioid fruit bodies. According to the infrageneric classification scheme proposed by Marr and Stuntz, R. botrytis is included in the subgenus Ramaria, which includes species that have grooved spores, clamps present in the hyphae, and fruit bodies with a large, profusely branched cauliflower-like appearance. Phylogenetic analysis of nuclear large subunit ribosomal DNA suggests that R. botrytis is closely related to R. rubripermanens and R. rubrievanescens, and that these species form a clade that is sister (sharing a recent common ancestor) to the false truffle genus Gautieria, the most derived group within the studied taxa.

== Description ==
The fruit bodies produced by the fungus are 6 to 20 cm (2 1/2 to 8 in) tall and 4 to 30 cm (1 1/2 to 12 in) wide. They are fleshy cauliflower-like masses with a stout central stem that splits into a few lower primary branches before branching densely above. The stem is short and thick—about 2–6 cm (3/4–2 1/4 in) long and 1.5–6 cm (1/2–2 1/4 in) in diameter—and tapers downward. Initially white, in age both the stem and branches turn pale yellow to buff to tan. Old fruit bodies can fade to become almost white, or may be ochre due to fallen spores. The branching pattern is irregular, with the primary branches few and thick—typically 2–3 cm (3/4–1 1/4 in)—and the final branches slender (2–3 mm), and usually terminated with five to seven branchlets. The branchlet tips are pink to purplish-red. The flesh is solid and white, and has an odor described variously as indistinct or pleasant. A drop of Melzer's reagent applied to the stem tissue reveals a weak amyloid staining reaction that often requires more than 30 minutes to develop. This reaction can be used to help distinguish R. botrytis from other similar fungi.

Spores are produced by basidia on the outer surface of the branches. Viewed in deposit, the spores are pale yellow. Microscopically, they have fine longitudinal or oblique striations that often fuse together in a vein-like network. They range in shape from roughly cylindrical to sigmoid (curved like the letter "S"), and their dimensions are 12–16 by 4–5 μm. Basidia are four-spored (occasionally two-spored), and measure 59–82 by 8–11 μm. The sterigmata (slender projections of the basidia that attach to the spores) are 4–8 μm long. The hymenium and subhymenium (the tissue layer immediately under the hymenium) combined are about 80 μm thick. Hyphae comprising the subhymenium are interwoven, 2.5–4.5 μm in diameter, thin-walled, and clamped.

The variety R. botrytis var. aurantiiramosa is distinguished from the more common variety by the orange color of the upper branches. Variety compactospora tends to show a more pronounced wine-red, purple, or reddish color in the branch tips, and has smaller spores measuring 9.2–12.8 by 4–5.4 μm.

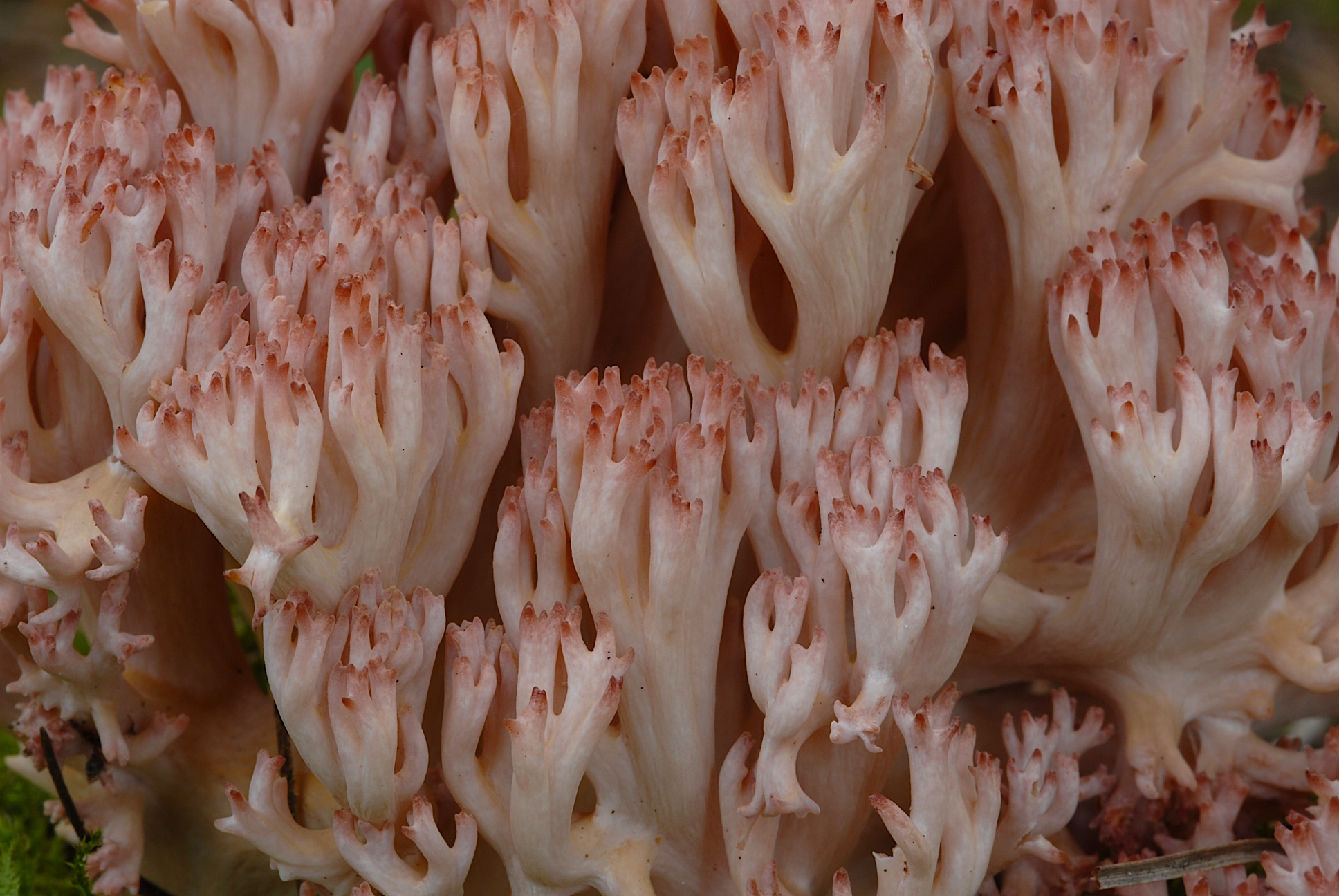
The branches are whitish to buff with reddish tips.

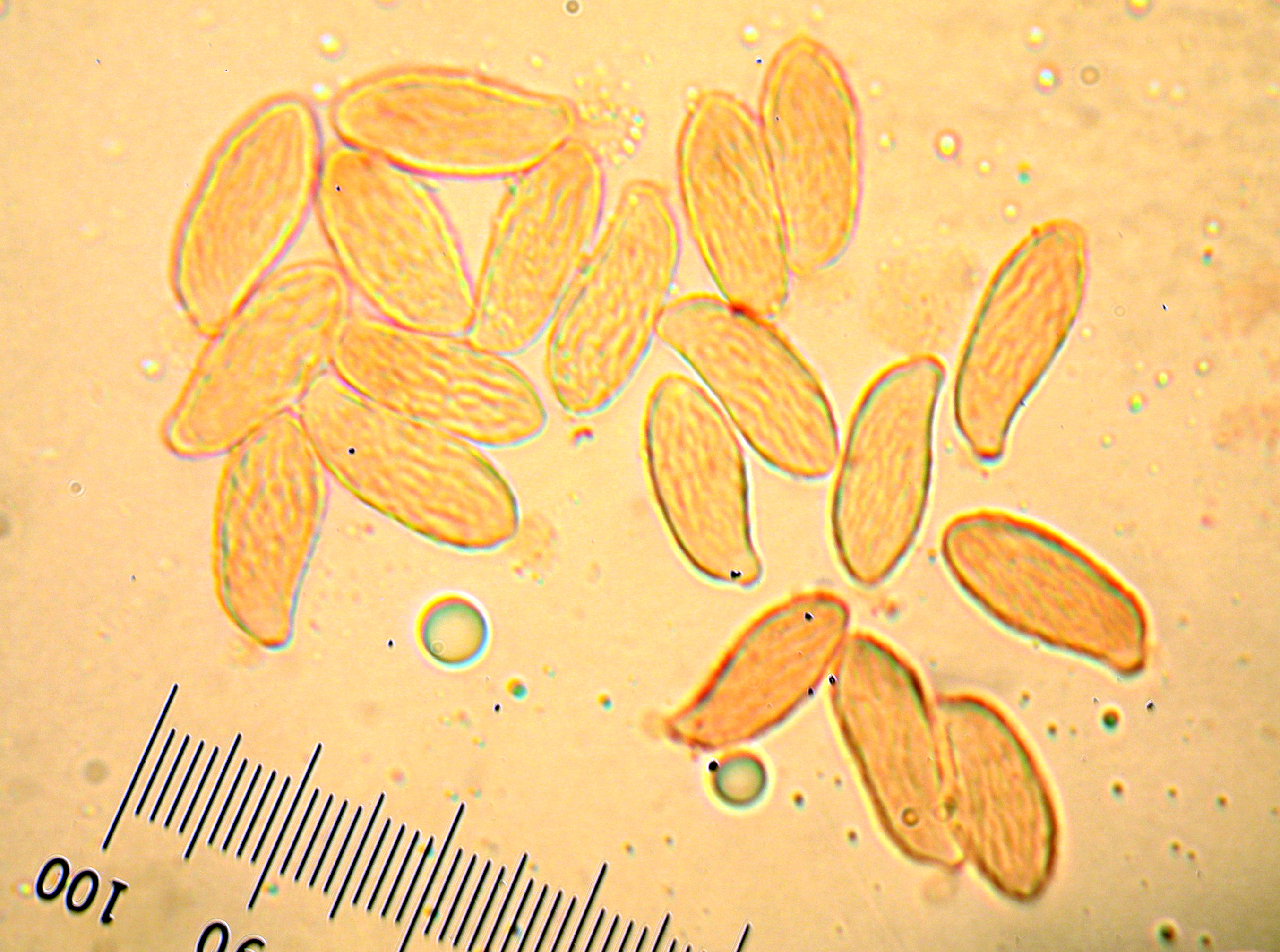
The cylindrical to S-shaped spores bear characteristic longitudinal striations.

=== Similar species ===
Distinctive features of Ramaria botrytis include its large size, the orange, reddish, or purplish branchlets, striate spores with dimensions averaging 13.8 by 4.7 μm, and a weak amyloid staining reaction of the stem tissue. R. rubripermanens has reddish terminal branches, a stout form, and striate spores, but may be distinguished from R. botrytis by its much shorter spores. Other species with which R. botrytis may be confused include: R. formosa, which has branches that are pinker than R. botrytis, and yellow-tipped; R. caulifloriformis, found in the Great Lakes region of the United States, whose branch tips darken with age; R. strasseri, which has yellow to brown branch tips; R. rubrievanescens, which has branches in which the pink color fades after picking or in mature fruit bodies; and R. botrytoides, which is most reliably distinguished from R. botrytis by its smooth spores. The European species R. rielii, often confused with R. botrytis and sometimes considered synonymous, can be distinguished by microscopic characteristics: R. reilii lacks the clamped hyphae of R. botrytis, its spores are longer and wider, and they have warts instead of striations. The North American species R. araiospora, though superficially similar to R. botrytis, has several distinguishing characteristics: it grows under hemlock; it has reddish to magenta branches with orange to yellowish tips; it lacks any discernible odor; it has warted, somewhat cylindrical spores averaging 9.9 by 3.7 μm; and it has non-amyloid stem tissue. Uniformly colored bright pink to reddish, R. subbotrytis has spores measuring 7–9 by 3–3.5 μm.

Lookalike Ramaria
R. araiospora	R. formosa	R. subbotrytis

== Habitat and distribution ==
An ectomycorrhizal species, R. botrytis forms mutualistic associations with broadleaf trees, particularly beech. In a study to determine the effectiveness of several edible ectomycorrhizal fungi in promoting growth and nutrient accumulation of large-fruited red mahogany (Eucalyptus pellita), R. botrytis was the best at improving root colonization and macronutrient uptake. Records of associations with conifers probably represent similar species. Fruit bodies grow on the ground singly, scattered, or in small groups among leaves in woods. They can also grow in fairy rings. Ramaria botrytis is a "snowbank fungus", meaning it commonly fruits near the edges of melting snowbanks in the spring. In Korea, it is prevalent at sites that also produce the choice edible species Tricholoma matsutake.

Ramaria botrytis is found in Africa (Tunisia), Australia, Chile, Asia (including the eastern Himalayas of India, Nepal, Japan, Korea, Pakistan, China, the Far East of Russia, and Turkey) and Europe (including the Netherlands, France, Portugal, Italy, Bulgaria, and Spain). It is widely distributed in North America (October–January on the West Coast and July–September elsewhere), where it is most common in the southeast and along the Pacific Coast but also appears in Mexico and Guatemala. The variety R. botrytis var. aurantiiramosa, limited in distribution to Lewis County, Washington, associates with Douglas-fir (Pseudotsuga menziesii) and western hemlock (Tsuga heterophylla). Variety compactospora is known from Sardinia, Italy, where it has been found growing in sandy soil in forests comprising strawberry tree (Arbutus unedo), tree heath (Erica arborea), and holm oak (Quercus ilex).

== Uses ==
Ramaria botrytis is an edible species, and some rate it as choice. Its taste is "slight", or "fruity", and has been likened to sauerkraut, green peanuts (fresh harvested peanuts that have not been dehydrated), or pea pods. Older fruit bodies develop an acidic flavor. It is sold in food markets in Japan as Nedzumi-take, and harvested from the wild in Korea and Nepal. The thick base and main branches require longer cooking than the smaller branchlets. In the Garfagnana region of central Italy, the mushroom is stewed, or pickled in oil. Fruit bodies can be preserved by slicing thinly and drying. One field guide rates the edibility as "questionable", warning of the possible danger of confusing specimens with the poisonous Ramaria formosa. Other authors warn that some individuals may experience laxative effects from consuming the mushroom. Caution is advised when collecting fruit bodies near polluted areas, as the species is known to bioaccumulate toxic arsenic.

Chemical analysis shows R. botrytis to have a food energy value of 154 kilojoules per 100 grams of fresh fruit bodies, which is comparable to the 120–150 kJ range reported for commercially grown edible mushrooms. As a percentage of dry matter, the fruit bodies contain 39.0% crude protein, 1.4% lipids, 50.8% carbohydrates, and 8.8% ash. The majority of the lipid content comprises oleic (43.9%), linoleic (38.3%), and palmitic (9.9%) fatty acids.

=== Chemistry ===
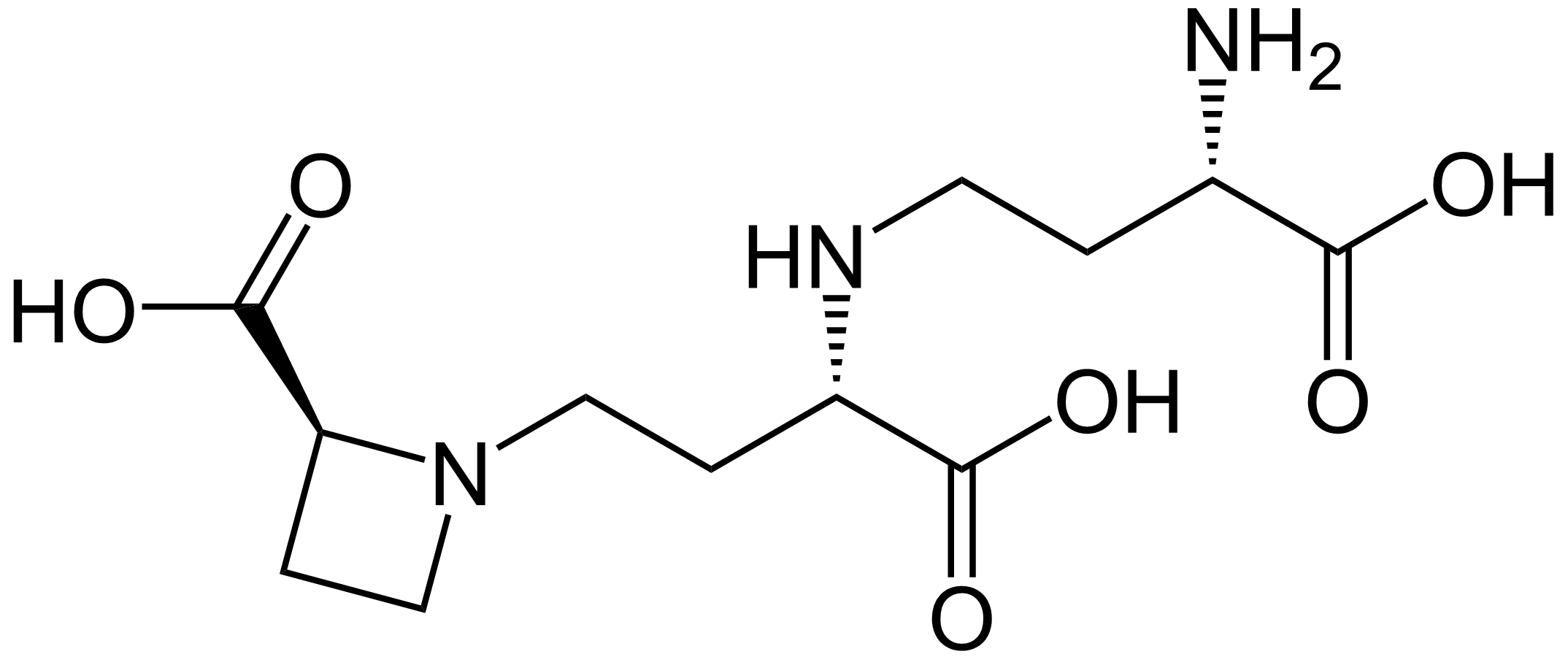
Nicotianamine

Extracts of the fruit body of Ramaria botrytis have been shown to favorably influence the growth and development of HeLa cells grown in tissue culture. The mushroom contains nicotianamine, an ACE inhibitor (angiotensin-converting enzyme). Nicotianamine is a metal-chelating compound essential in iron metabolism and utilization in plants. Several sterols have been isolated from the fruit bodies, 5α,6α-epoxy-3β-hydroxy-(22E)-ergosta-8(14),22-dien-7-one, ergosterol peroxide, cerevisterol, and 9α-hydroxycerevisterol, in addition to the previously unknown ceramide (2S,2'R,3R,4E,8E)-N-2'-hydroxyoctadecanoyl-2-amino-9-methyl-4,8-heptade-cadiene-1,3-diol.

Laboratory tests show that fruit bodies have antimicrobial activity against several strains of drug-resistant bacteria that are pathogenic in humans. Extracts inhibit the growth of the gram-positive bacteria Enterococcus faecalis and Listeria monocytogenes, and kill the gram-positive species Pasteurella multocida, Streptococcus agalactiae and S. pyogenes.

In a 2009 study of 16 Portuguese edible wild mushroom species, R. botrytis was shown to have the highest concentration of phenolic acids (356.7 mg per kg of fresh fruit body), made up largely of protocatechuic acid; it also had the highest antioxidant capacity. Phenolic compounds—common in fruits and vegetables—are being scientifically investigated for their potential health benefits associated with reduced risk of chronic and degenerative diseases.
