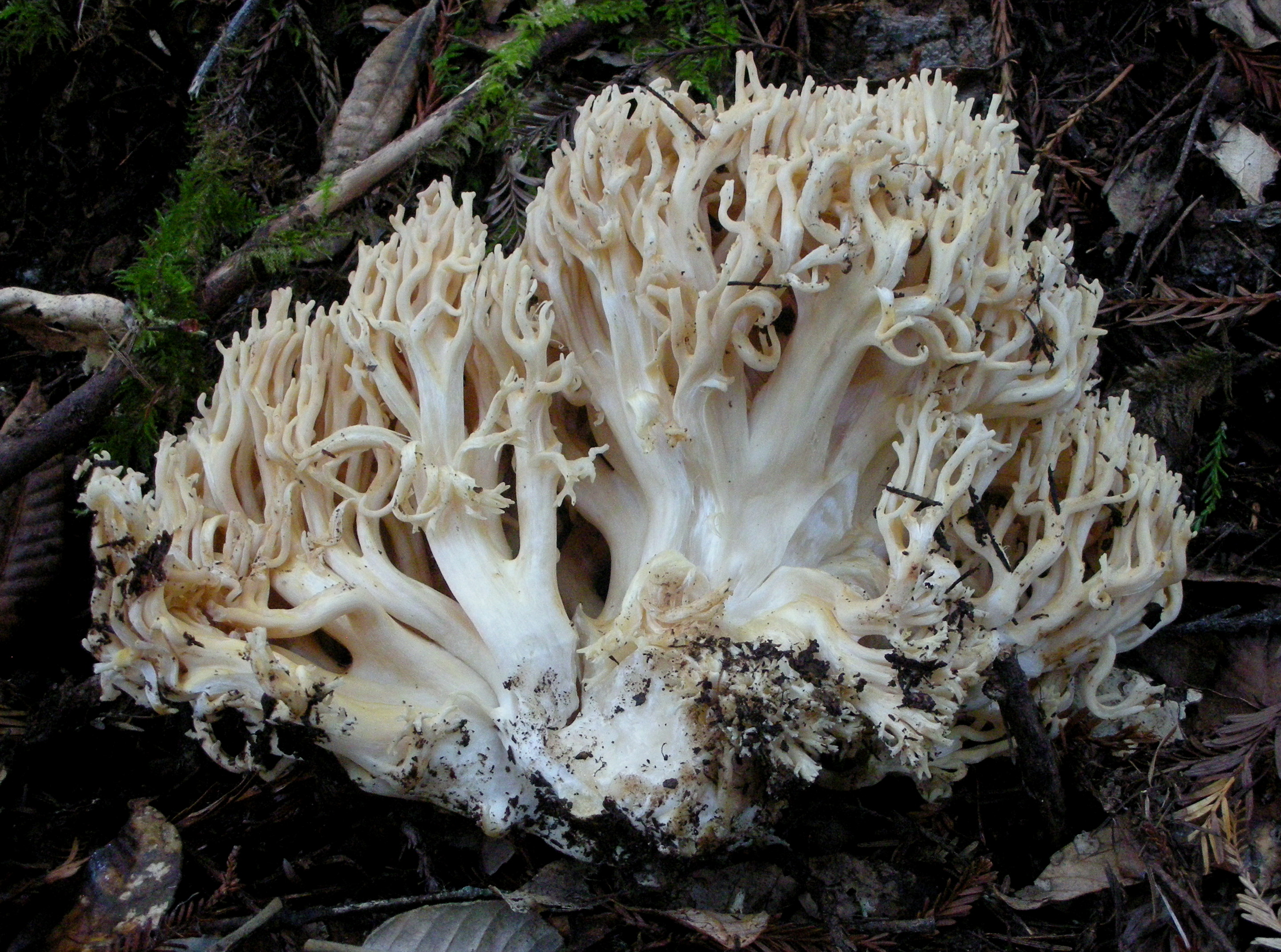

Conservation status
- Least Concern (IUCN 3.1)

- Apparently Secure (NatureServe)

Scientific classification
- Kingdom: Fungi
- Division: Basidiomycota
- Class: Agaricomycetes
- Order: Gomphales
- Family: Gomphaceae
- Genus: Ramaria
- Species: R. rubrievanescens

Binomial name
- Ramaria rubrievanescens Marr & D.E.Stuntz (1974)

= Ramaria rubrievanescens =

Species of fungus

Ramaria rubrievanescens, commonly known as the fading pink coral, is a coral mushroom in the family Gomphaceae. It is found in North America.

The coral is generally white with pinkish branch tips. The stem often bruises brown.

Ramaria rubripermanens is quite similar, fruiting in spring and autumn, and retaining color in its tips for longer, while R. rubrievanescens fruits only in autumn, and the colour of the tips fades quickly. Both species have a similar spore size, which are smaller than in R. botrytis. These species are sometimes eaten, but for some people they have a laxative effect.
