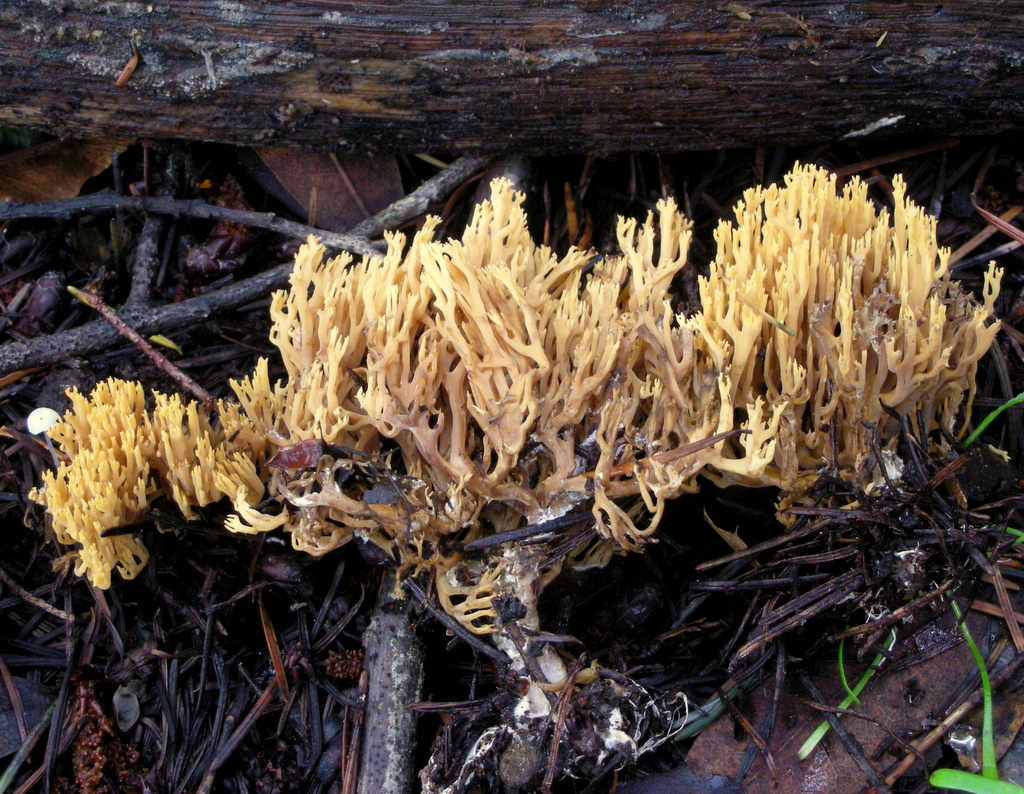

Scientific classification
- Kingdom: Fungi
- Division: Basidiomycota
- Class: Agaricomycetes
- Order: Gomphales
- Family: Gomphaceae
- Genus: Ramaria
- Species: R. myceliosa

Binomial name
- Ramaria myceliosa (Peck) Corner (1950)

Synonyms
- Clavaria myceliosa Peck (1904)

= Ramaria myceliosa =

Species of fungus

Ramaria myceliosa
- Mycological characteristics
- Smooth hymenium
- No distinct cap
- Hymenium attachment is irregular or not applicable
- Stipe is bare
- Edibility is unknown

Ramaria myceliosa is a species of coral fungus in the family Gomphaceae. Found in North America, it was originally described by Charles Horton Peck in 1904 with the name Clavaria myceliosa. The type was collected by botanist Edwin Bingham Copeland in the mountains near Stanford University in California. E. J. H. Corner transferred it to the genus Ramaria in 1950. Giachini and colleagues proposed that R. myceliosa is the same species as the European Phaeoclavulina curta, but did not provide molecular evidence to support their suggested synonymy. In a recent (2014) publication on California fungi, the authors propose the transfer of R. myceliosa to the genus Phaeoclavulina, but as of January 2016, this transfer has not been accepted by either MycoBank or Index Fungorum.

The fruiting body is usually about 3–6 cm tall and wide, yellowish to tan, with tips branching into two to four points, whitish flesh, mild odor, and bitter taste. The stalks are about 2 cm tall. The spores are yellowish. The species is inedible.

Similar species include Ramaria abietina and Ramaria stricta.
