= Gautieria otthii =

Conservation status
- Apparently Secure (NatureServe)

Scientific classification
- Domain: Eukaryota
- Kingdom: Fungi
- Division: Basidiomycota
- Class: Agaricomycetes
- Order: Gomphales
- Family: Gomphaceae
- Genus: Gautieria
- Species: G. otthii

Binomial name
- Gautieria otthii Trog

Species of fungus

Gautieria otthii is a species of hypogeal fungus in the family Gomphaceae.
