= Gautieria trabutii =

Scientific classification
- Domain: Eukaryota
- Kingdom: Fungi
- Division: Basidiomycota
- Class: Agaricomycetes
- Order: Gomphales
- Family: Gomphaceae
- Genus: Gautieria
- Species: G. trabutii

Binomial name
- Gautieria trabutii (Chatin) Pat.

Species of fungus

Gautieria trabutii is a species of hypogeal fungus in the family Gomphaceae.
