= Gautieria inapire =

Scientific classification
- Domain: Eukaryota
- Kingdom: Fungi
- Division: Basidiomycota
- Class: Agaricomycetes
- Order: Gomphales
- Family: Gomphaceae
- Genus: Gautieria
- Species: G. inapire

Binomial name
- Gautieria inapire Palfner & E. Horak

Species of fungus

Gautieria inapire is a species of hypogeal fungus in the family Gomphaceae found in Chile.
