= Gautieria sinensis =

Scientific classification
- Domain: Eukaryota
- Kingdom: Fungi
- Division: Basidiomycota
- Class: Agaricomycetes
- Order: Gomphales
- Family: Gomphaceae
- Genus: Gautieria
- Species: G. sinensis

Binomial name
- Gautieria sinensis J.Z. Ying

Species of fungus

Gautieria sinensis is a species of hypogeal fungus in the family Gomphaceae.
