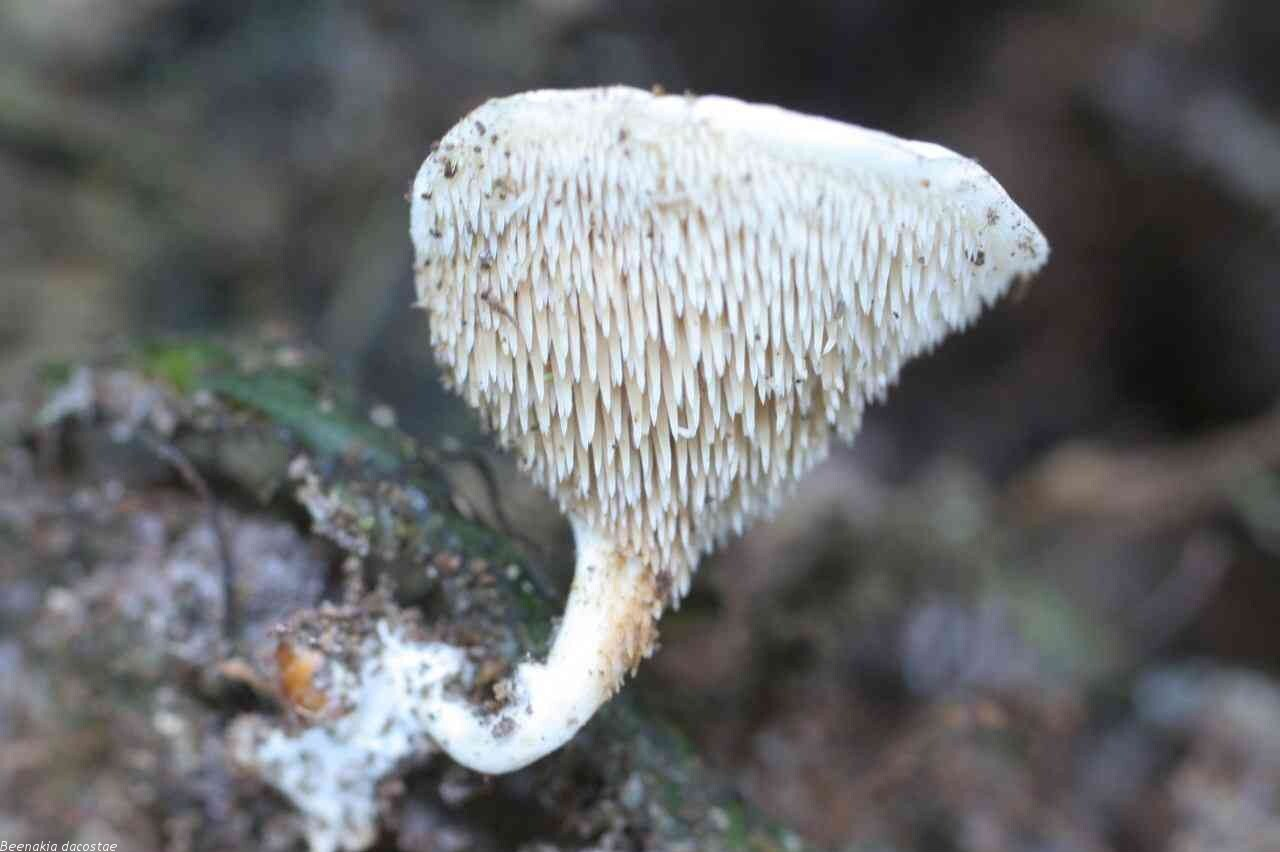

Scientific classification
- Kingdom: Fungi
- Division: Basidiomycota
- Class: Agaricomycetes
- Order: Gomphales
- Family: Clavariadelphaceae
- Genus: Beenakia
- Species: B. dacostae

Binomial name
- Beenakia dacostae D.A.Reid

= Beenakia dacostae =

Species of fungus

Beenakia dacostae is commonly found growing around parts of Victoria and Tasmania, Australia. Found in the family Clavariadelphaceae this small, stalked fungus has a very smooth, white, wavy cap. Pale olive-brown teeth underneath the cap are long, pointed and extend part way down the stem.

== Description ==
Commonly found growing on dry, woody debris or rotten branches in wet eucalypt forests. This small, stalked fungus has a very smooth, white, wavy cap. Pale olive-brown teeth underneath the cap are long, pointed and extend part way down the stem. The thin, woody stem is smooth and white, but often coloured pale brown with spores.

Cap has a diameter to 25 mm; round to kidney-shaped, ageing flat to wavy; white, cream to ochre, drying to yellow-brown; smooth, cottony with soft matted hairs; margin often lobed. Central, off-centre or lateral stem; length to 30 mm, diameter to 3 mm, often poorly developed; slightly curved; white, yellow-brown at apex; woody, smooth, cottony with soft hairs. Basal mycelium white, matted. Teeth are decurrent; length to 10 mm; slender, tapering to a point; crowded; pale olive-brown.

The toothed Wood Hedgehog (Hydnum repandum)is a common look-alike, also found in leaf litter though is much larger (cap to 70 mm), has apricot tints and has a far more robust stem.

This species is listed as Near Threatened by the IUCN.
