= Gautieria mexicana =

Scientific classification
- Domain: Eukaryota
- Kingdom: Fungi
- Division: Basidiomycota
- Class: Agaricomycetes
- Order: Gomphales
- Family: Gomphaceae
- Genus: Gautieria
- Species: G. mexicana

Binomial name
- Gautieria mexicana (E.Fisch.) Zeller & C.W.Dodge (1934)

Species of fungus

Gautieria mexicana is a species of hypogeal fungus in the family Gomphaceae.
