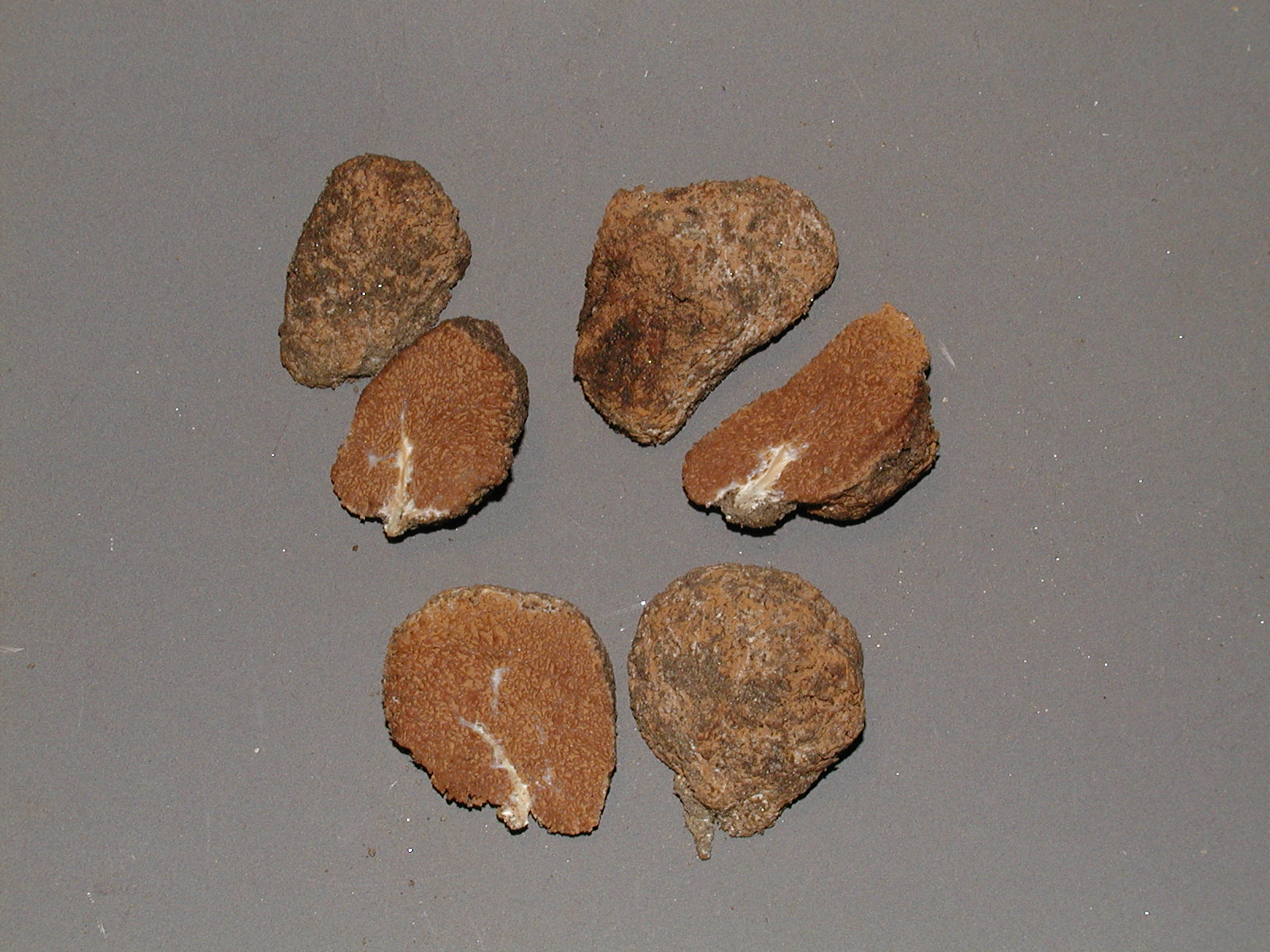

Scientific classification
- Kingdom: Fungi
- Division: Basidiomycota
- Class: Agaricomycetes
- Order: Gomphales
- Family: Gomphaceae
- Genus: Gautieria
- Species: G. monticola

Binomial name
- Gautieria monticola Harkn. (1884)

= Gautieria monticola =

Species of fungus

Gautieria monticola
- Mycological characteristics
- Glebal hymenium
- No distinct cap
- Hymenium attachment is irregular or not applicable
- Lacks a stipe
- Spore print is white
- Ecology is mycorrhizal
- Edibility is edible

Gautieria monticola is a species of hypogeal truffle-like fungus in the family Gomphaceae. It was described as new to science in 1884 by American mycologist Harvey Willson Harkness.

It grows up to 9 centimetres (3 1/2 in) across with no stem. It is pallid in youth then tannish to brownish, with similarly coloured spore chambers. In age, it smells like decaying onions or sour milk.

It is nonpoisonous, but has a rubbery texture and may smell unpleasant.
