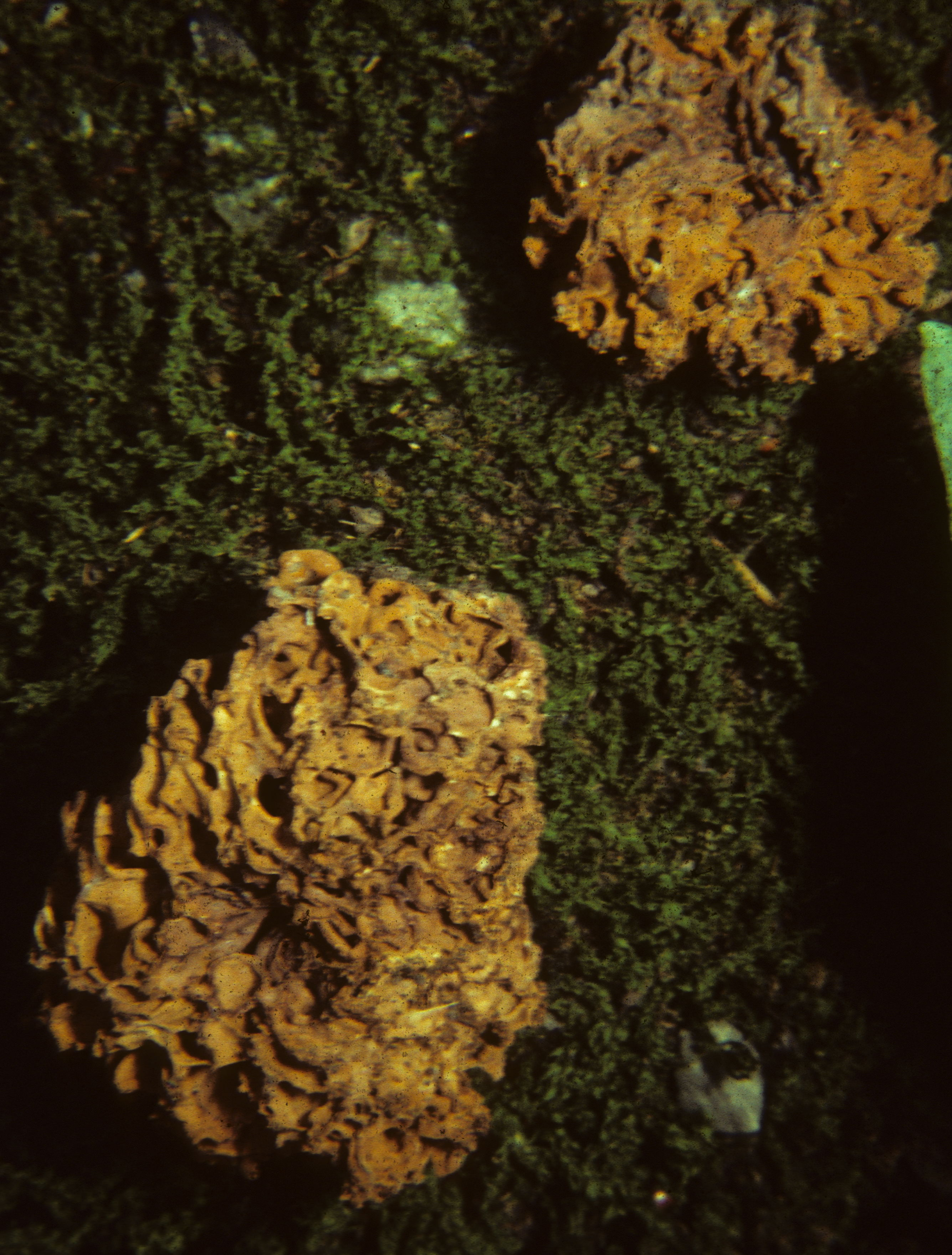

Scientific classification
- Domain: Eukaryota
- Kingdom: Fungi
- Division: Basidiomycota
- Class: Agaricomycetes
- Order: Gomphales
- Family: Gomphaceae
- Genus: Gautieria
- Species: G. morchelliformis

Binomial name
- Gautieria morchelliformis Vittad. (1831)

Synonyms
- Uslaria morchelliformis (Vittad.) Nieuwl. (1916)

= Gautieria morchelliformis =

Species of fungus

Gautieria morchelliformis is a species of hypogeal fungus in the family Gomphaceae. It was first described scientifically by Italian Carlo Vittadini in 1831. Three varieties have been described: var. globispora and var. stenospora by Albert Pilát in 1958; and var. microspora by Evžen Wichanský in 1962. None are considered to have independent taxonomical significance.
