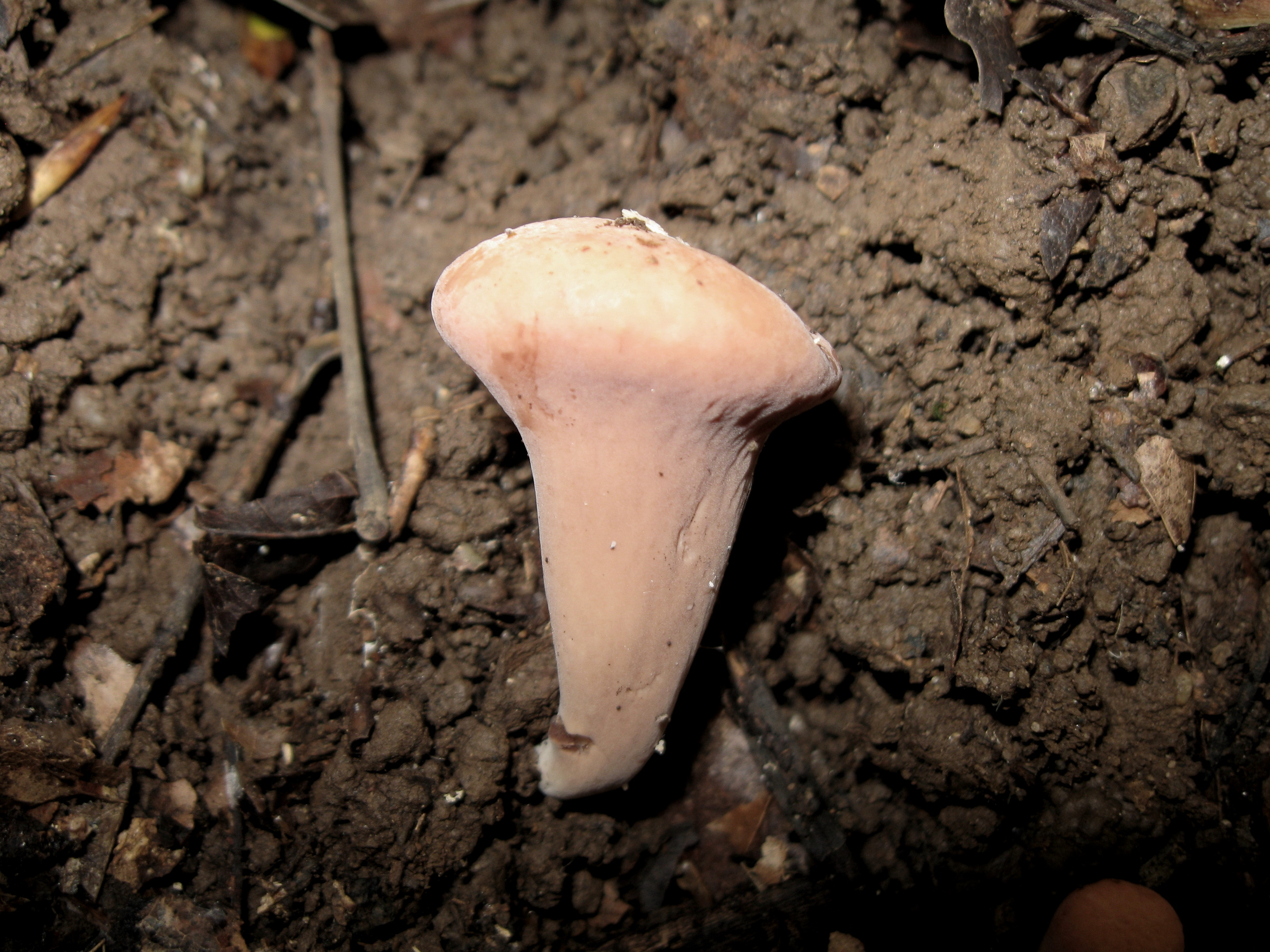

Scientific classification
- Kingdom: Fungi
- Division: Basidiomycota
- Class: Agaricomycetes
- Order: Gomphales
- Family: Clavariadelphaceae
- Genus: Clavariadelphus
- Species: C. unicolor

Binomial name
- Clavariadelphus unicolor (Berk. & Ravenel) Corner (1950)

Synonyms
- Craterellus unicolor Berk. & Ravenel (1873); Trombetta unicolor (Berk. & Ravenel) Kuntze (1891); Clavaria pistillaris var. unicolor (Berk. & Ravenel) Coker (1947)

= Clavariadelphus unicolor =

Species of fungus

Clavariadelphus unicolor is a species of club fungus in the family Gomphaceae found in North America. Originally described in 1873 by Miles Joseph Berkeley and Henry William Ravenel as Craterellus unicolor, it was transferred to the genus Clavariadelphus by Edred John Henry Corner in 1950.
