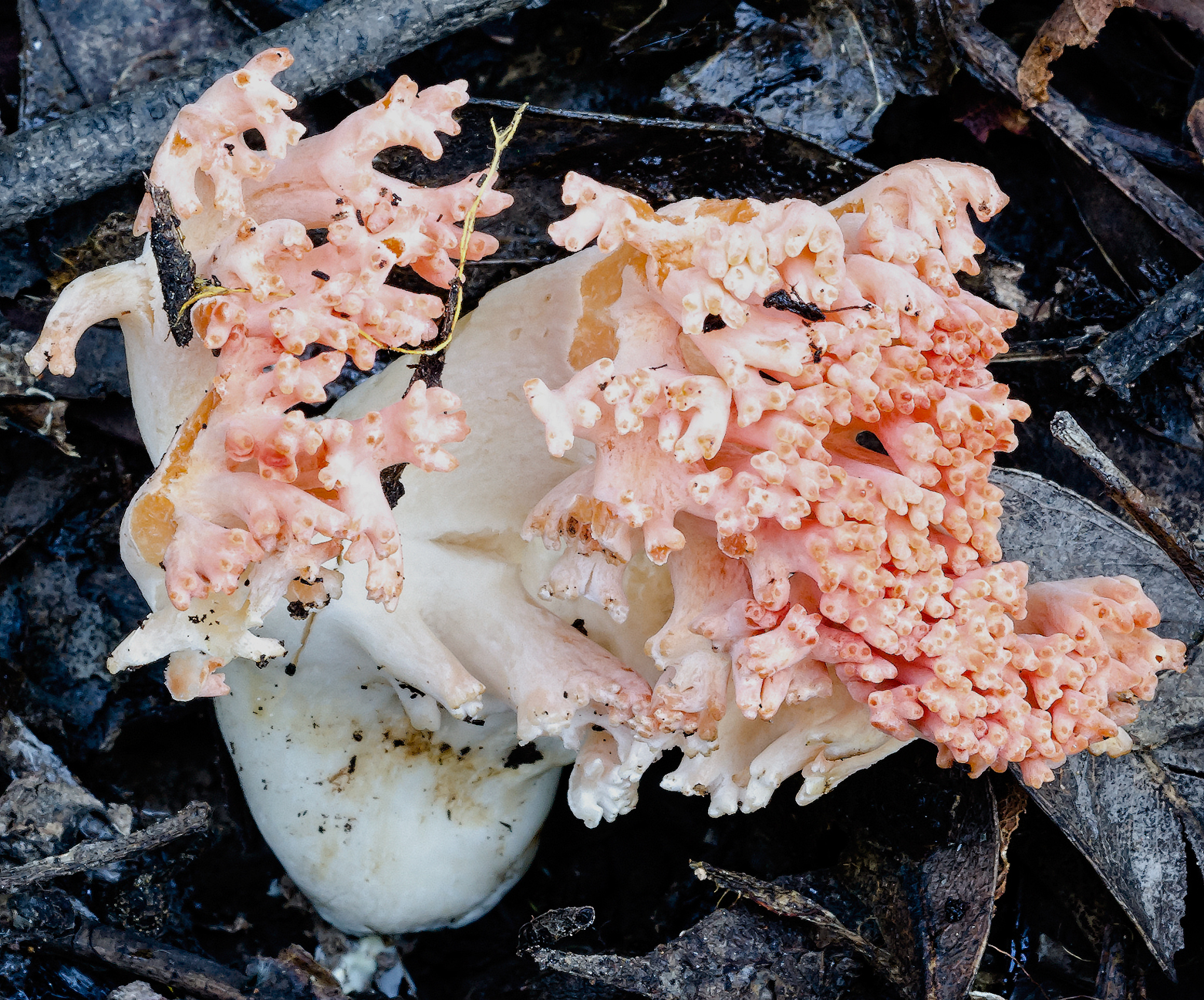

Scientific classification
- Domain: Eukaryota
- Kingdom: Fungi
- Division: Basidiomycota
- Class: Agaricomycetes
- Order: Gomphales
- Family: Gomphaceae
- Genus: Ramaria
- Species: R. botrytoides

Binomial name
- Ramaria botrytoides (Peck) Corner (1950)

Synonyms
- Clavaria botryoides Peck (1905)

= Ramaria botrytoides =

Species of fungus

Ramaria botrytoides is a species of coral fungus in the family Gomphaceae. First described by American mycologist Charles Horton Peck in 1905 as Clavaria botryoides, it was transferred to the genus Ramaria in 1950 by E.J.H. Corner. Found in the eastern United States, it resembles Ramaria botrytis, but can be most reliably distinguished from that species by the lack of longitudinal striations in its spores.
