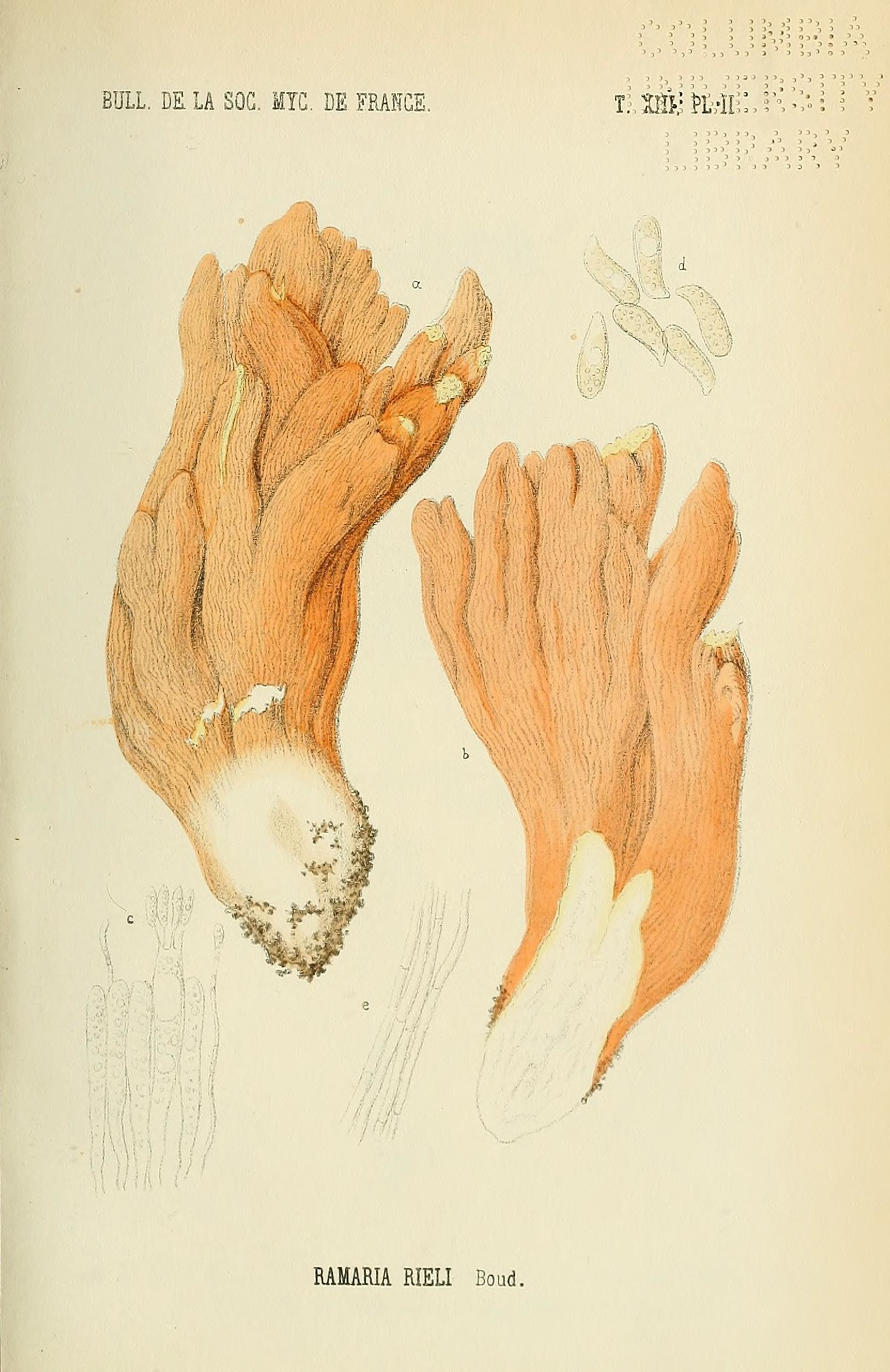

Scientific classification
- Kingdom: Fungi
- Division: Basidiomycota
- Class: Agaricomycetes
- Order: Gomphales
- Family: Gomphaceae
- Genus: Ramaria
- Species: R. rielii

Binomial name
- Ramaria rielii Boud. (1897)

Synonyms
- Clavaria rielii (Boud.) Sacc. & P.Syd. (1899)

= Ramaria rielii =

Species of fungus

Ramaria rielii is a European species of coral fungus in the family Gomphaceae. It was described in 1897 by Jean Louis Émile Boudier. It is quite similar in appearance to the more common and widely distributed Ramaria botrytis, but can be distinguished from that species by the lack of clamped hyphae, its longer and wider spores, and warts instead of striations on the spore surface.
