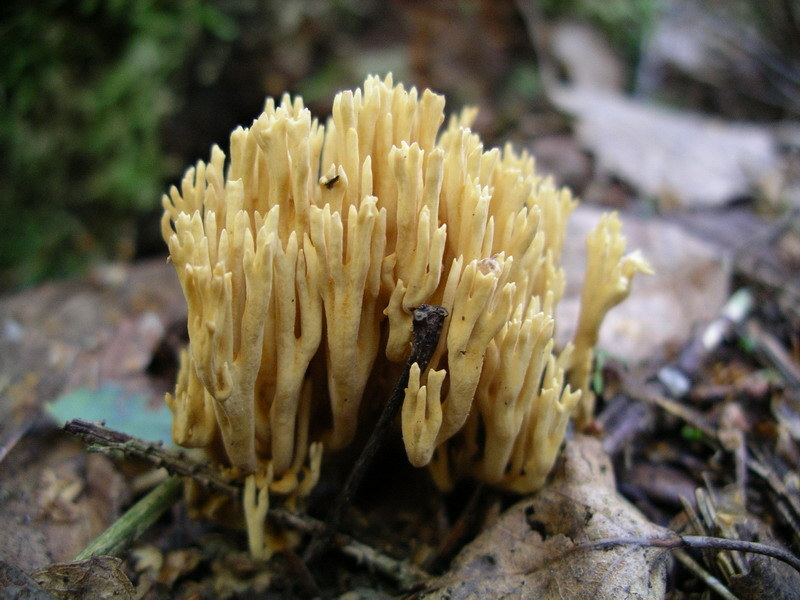

Conservation status
- Apparently Secure (NatureServe)

Scientific classification
- Kingdom: Fungi
- Division: Basidiomycota
- Class: Agaricomycetes
- Order: Gomphales
- Family: Gomphaceae
- Genus: Phaeoclavulina
- Species: P. abietina

Binomial name
- Phaeoclavulina abietina (Pers.) Giachini (2011)

Synonyms
- Clavaria abietina Pers. (1794); Merisma abietinum (Pers.) Sprengel (1827); Hydnum abietinum (Pers.) Duby (1830); Clavariella abietina (Pers.) J.Schröt. (1888); Ramaria abietina (Pers.) Quél. (1888); Ramaria ochraceovirens

= Phaeoclavulina abietina =

Species of fungus

Phaeoclavulina abietina
- Mycological characteristics
- Smooth hymenium
- Hymenium attachment is irregular or not applicable
- Stipe is bare
- Edibility is inedible

Phaeoclavulina abietina, commonly known as the green-staining coral, is a coral mushroom in the family Gomphaceae. It is characterized by the green staining reaction it develops in response to bruising or injury.

== Taxonomy ==
The species was first described by Christian Hendrik Persoon in 1794 as Clavaria abietina. It is commonly known as the "green-staining coral". It was classified in the genus Ramaria (in the subgenus Echinoramaria), until molecular phylogenetic showed that Ramaria was polyphyletic.

== Description ==
The fruit bodies are leathery, and brittle when dry. They are small, measuring 2–5 cm (3/4–2 in) tall by 1–5 cm (1/2–2 in) wide, and branch from the central stem up to five times. The slender branches are slightly flattened or spreading, and forked or crested near the top. The color of the fruit body is medium yellow green to light olive, but will bruise a darker olive green to dark olive green. The stem is 5–15 mm (1/4–5/8 in) long and 2–10 mm (1/8–3/8 in) thick; it has a mat of mycelia at its base, which is attached to rhizomorphs that branch into the substrate. The odor of the mushroom tissue ranges from indistinct to earthy, and it tastes initially sweet, then somewhat bitter. The species is inedible.

The spores are dark orange-yellow when collected in mass. The spores are pip-shaped to broadly elliptical, with one oblique end; their dimensions are 6–9 by 3.5–4.5 μm. The basidia (spore-bearing cells) are typically four-spored, with the spores attached by sterigmata up to 7 μm long.

=== Similar species ===
Phaeoclavulina myceliosa is very similar but does not produce a greenish stain.

Ramaria apiculata differs in its bright teal tips. Also similar in appearance is R. invalii, which does not stain when bruised.

== Habitat and distribution ==
Fruit bodies grow scattered or in groups (sometimes arranged in rows) on the ground in duff of coniferous forests. In North America, it is found in the United States (mostly October–February on the West Coast and July–October inland), including the Pacific Northwest, as well as Mexico. It is also found in Europe.
