= Phaeoclavulina murrillii =

Scientific classification
- Kingdom: Fungi
- Division: Basidiomycota
- Class: Agaricomycetes
- Order: Gomphales
- Family: Gomphaceae
- Genus: Phaeoclavulina
- Species: P. murrillii

Binomial name
- Phaeoclavulina murrillii (Coker) Franchi & M.Marchetti (2018)

Synonyms
- Clavaria murrilli; Ramaria murrilli

Phaeoclavulina murrillii is a coral fungus that is widely distributed in the southeastern United States. It has also been found as far North in the United States as Michigan, and in Spain.

== Taxonomy ==
It was first found in 1904 by William Alphonso Murrill. Originally, it was described as Clavaria murrilli by William Chambers Coker. Later it was moved to Ramaria by Edred John Henry Corner.

== Description ==
=== Fruit body ===
The fruit body may be growing singularly or in scattered groups on the ground in humus in broadleaf or mixed broadleaf and conifer forests from June through October. Fruiting has additionally been reported as occurring in low nutrient areas within meadows. The size ranges from 4–12 centimeters high that are coral-like in appearance with many branches and arising from a rounded, central stalk. Much of the lower portion of the fruitbody and the stipe have white threads that stain pinkish, and these threads can be observed on dry specimens too. The branches are rounded and described as a "dull brownish pink to pale rusty brown, darkening when bruised", and are fibrous-tough and twisted and divided. The branch tips can be pointed or blunt, and are white at first, becoming "golden-yellow to orange" and turning more brown with age.

Mycological characteristics
- Spore print is ochre
- Edibility is unknown

=== Spore print ===
The spores have a "dull ochraceous tan" deposit.

=== Microscopic features ===
The spores "appear brown under the microscope". The spore size is comparatively more divergent than similar species ranging from 6.5–9.5 × 3.5–5.5 μm, and they are "elliptic to bottle-shaped" or "elongate pip-shaped". The basidia are clavate, 5–5.5 μm wide and 4-spored. The hymenium is 50–60 μm thick. The hyphae are 3.5–5 μm wide and clamp-connections are present.

=== Chemical test ===
Applying $\ce{FeSO4}$ to the branches will cause them to stain green.

=== Edibility ===
The edibility is unknown. It has a nondistinctive odor, and the taste of the flesh is described as bitter.
