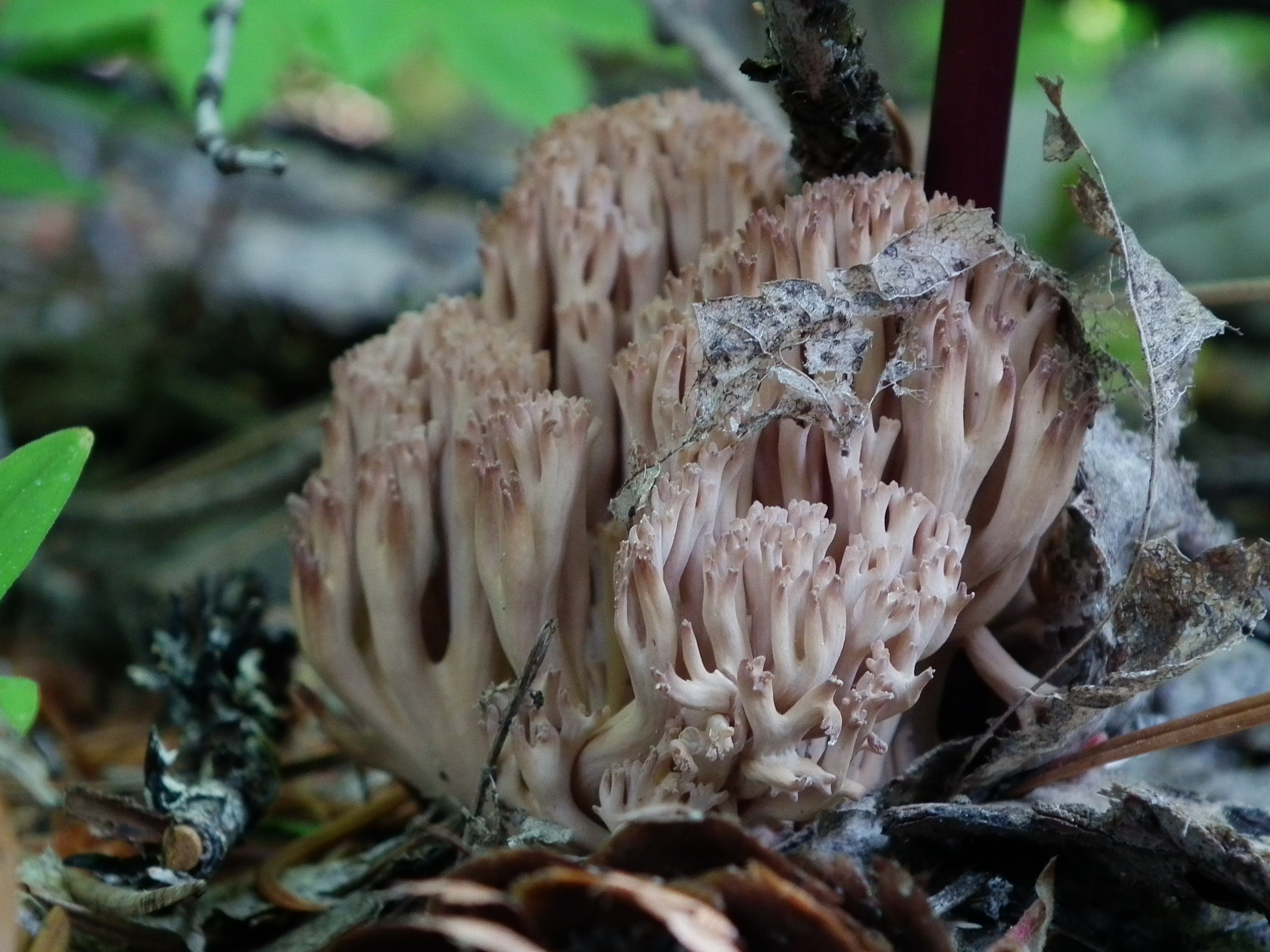

Conservation status
- Least Concern (IUCN 3.1)

- Apparently Secure (NatureServe)

Scientific classification
- Kingdom: Fungi
- Division: Basidiomycota
- Class: Agaricomycetes
- Order: Gomphales
- Family: Gomphaceae
- Genus: Ramaria
- Species: R. rubripermanens

Binomial name
- Ramaria rubripermanens Marr & D.E.Stuntz (1973)

= Ramaria rubripermanens =

Species of fungus

Ramaria rubripermanens is a species of coral fungus in the family Gomphaceae. Described as new to science in 1973, it is found in the western United States and Mexico. Its fruit bodies, which resemble sea coral, grow up to 16 cm (6.3 in) tall and feature whitish to light yellow branches with pinkish to reddish tips. It is edible.

== Taxonomy ==
The fungus was described as new to science in 1973 by Currie Marr and Daniel Stuntz in their monograph on the Ramaria of western Washington. The type collection was made in Washington in 1967.

== Description ==
Fruit bodies grow on the ground, and measure 9–13 cm (3.5–5.1 in) wide by 9–16 cm (3.5–6.3 in) tall. Young fruit bodies have whitish to light yellow branches (which dry to fawn-brown with a reddish tint) with pinkish to reddish tips. The flesh has a sweet odor and an indistinct taste. Its spores are somewhat ellipsoid, have longitudinal striations (grooves), and measure 8–13 by 3.5–4.5 μm (averaging 10.3 by 3.8 μm). It is an edible mushroom.

=== Similar species ===
Ramaria rubripermanens is somewhat similar in appearance to Ramaria botrytis, but can be distinguished from that species by the persisting pink to red coloration of the branch tips, and the lack of a staining reaction in the branches. It can be reliably distinguished from R. botrytis by its smaller spores, which measure 8–13 by 3.5–4.5 μm. The basidia, which feature a clamp at their bases, are club-shaped, usually four-spored, and measure 31–62 by 7–11 μm.

== Habitat and distribution ==
Ramaria rubripermanens is known from the western United States, including Washington, Idaho, and Oregon. It has also been recorded in Mexico.
