= Terenodon =

Scientific classification
- Kingdom: Fungi
- Division: Basidiomycota
- Class: Agaricomycetes
- Order: Gomphales
- Family: Gomphaceae
- Genus: Terenodon; Maas Geest.

Type species
- Terenodon serenus Maas Geest.

Genus of fungi

Terenodon is a genus of fungi in the family Gomphaceae. A monotypic genus, it contains the single species Terenodon serenus, described by Dutch mycologist Rudolph Arnold Maas Geesteranus in 1971.
