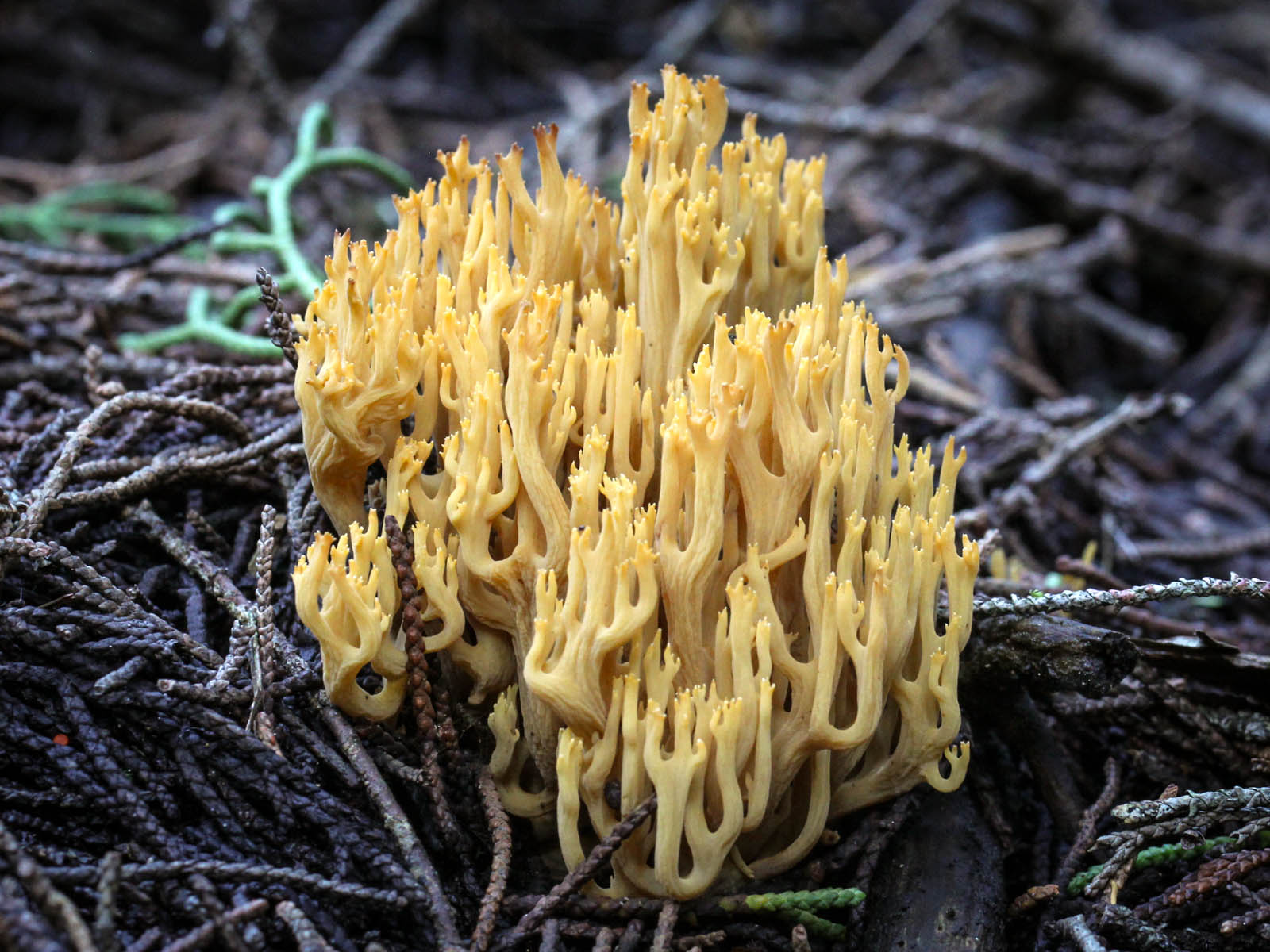
- Phaeoclavulina myceliosa

Scientific classification
- Kingdom: Fungi
- Division: Basidiomycota
- Class: Agaricomycetes
- Order: Gomphales
- Family: Gomphaceae
- Genus: Phaeoclavulina; Brinkmann (1897)

Type species
- Phaeoclavulina macrospora Brinkmann (1897)

= Phaeoclavulina =

Genus of fungi

The genus Phaeoclavulina comprises over 60 species of coral fungi.

== Description ==
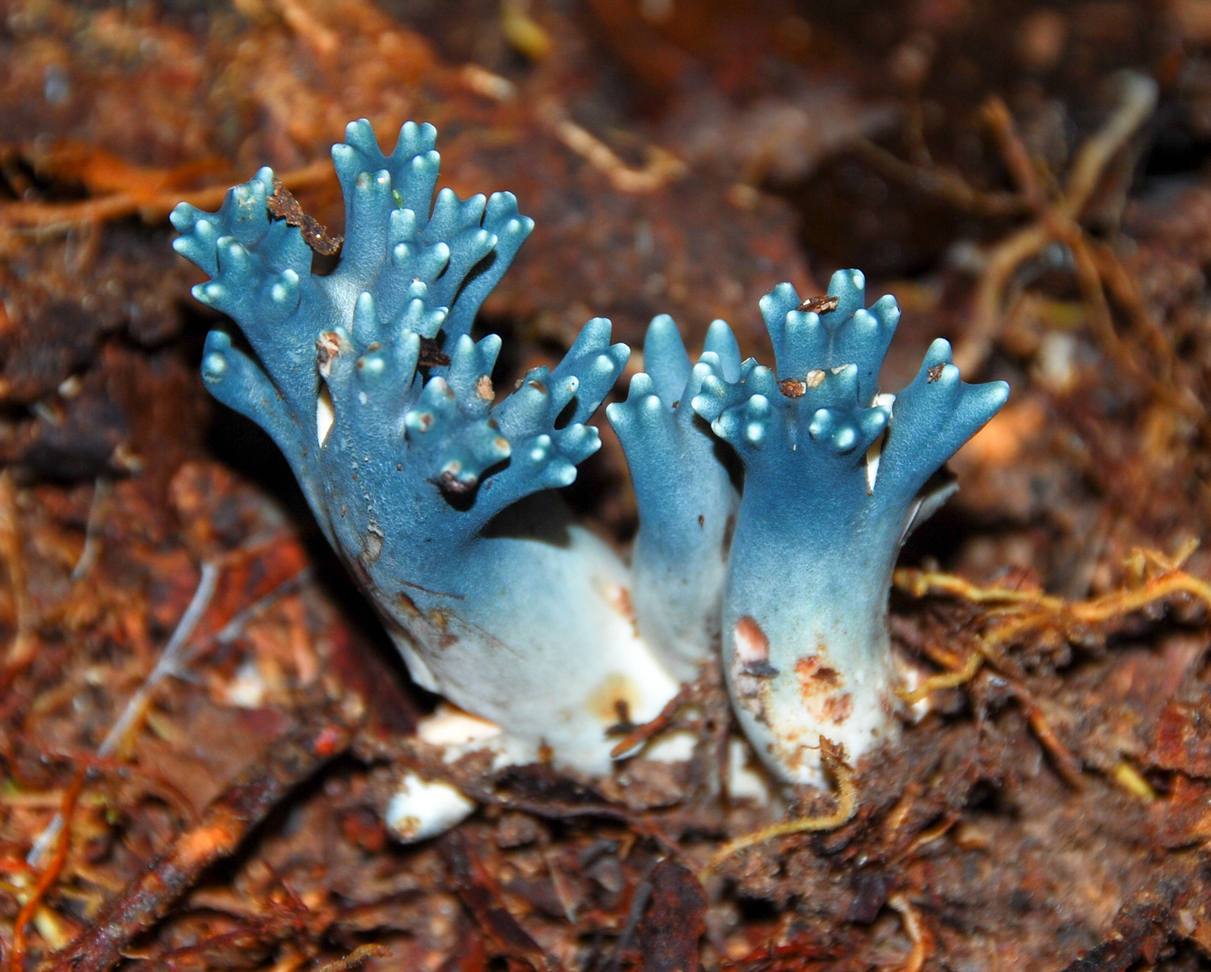
P. cyanocephala

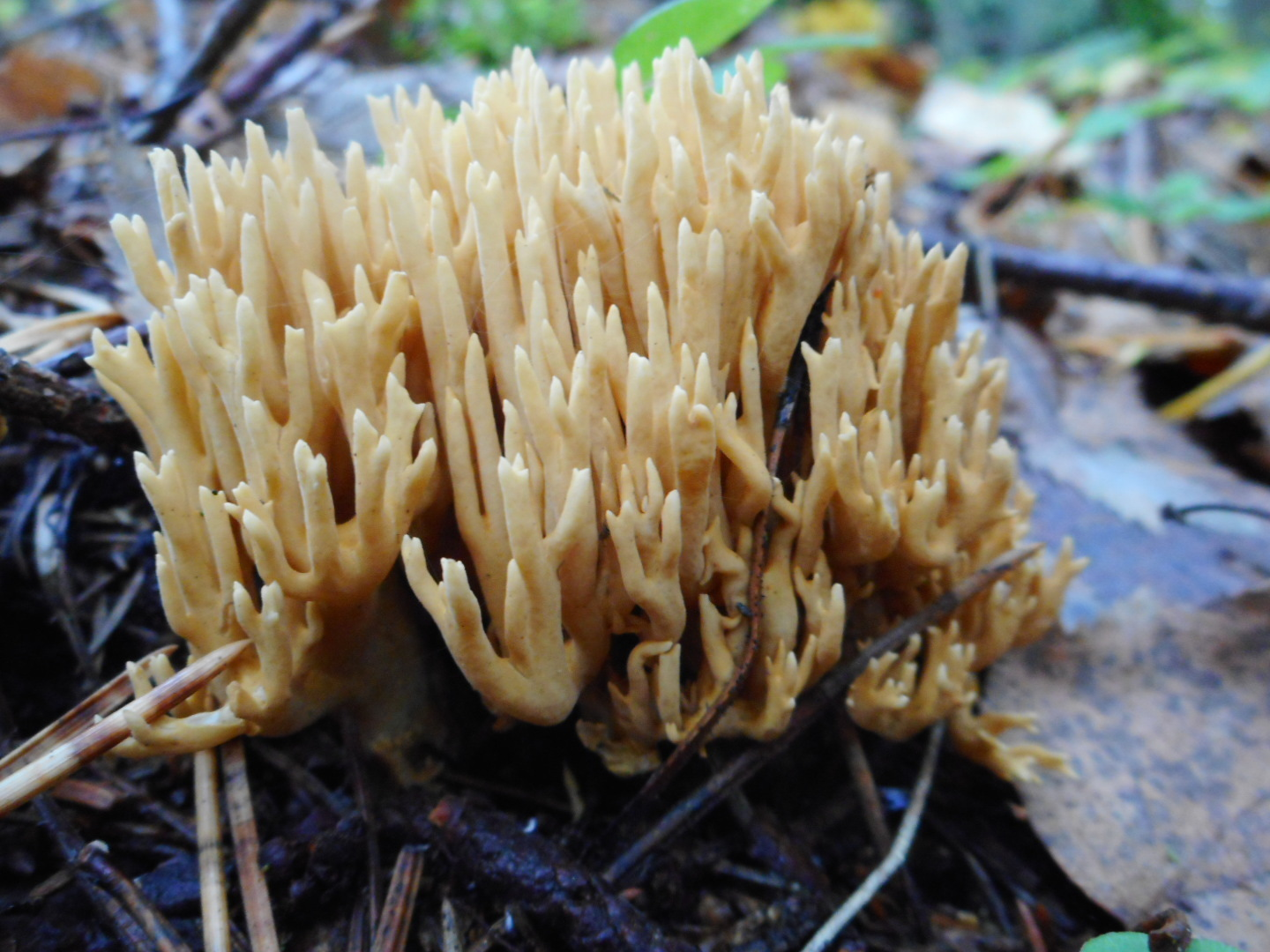
P. eumorpha

Basidiocarps may range in color from bright yellow, to ochre, orange or shades of tan. The spores of Phaeoclavulina species are ochre-brown in mass deposit and are echinulate (covered with small spines).

== Distribution ==
Phaeoclavulina species range from tropical to temperate regions. They are more abundant in the tropics and subtropics. Many Phaeoclavulina species have a cosmopolitan distribution.

== History ==
- The genus was proposed in 1897 to accommodate coral fungi with spiny spores.
- The genus has been expanded in 2011 to include certain species formerly classified in Gomphus and Ramaria genera. After that, the genus Phaeoclavulina included 41 species.
- Between 2018 and 2022, 15 new species were described from Italy, Mexico, and China.
- P. bicolor, P. echinoflava, P. jilinensis, P. aurantilaeta, and P. yunnanensis were described in 2024 from China.
- P. aeruginea & P. cinnamomea were described in 2025 from Hunan Province, China.

== Species ==
The following species are recognised in the genus Phaeoclavulina:

- Phaeoclavulina abietina
- Phaeoclavulina aeruginea
- Phaeoclavulina africana
- Phaeoclavulina alboapiculata
- Phaeoclavulina angustata
- Phaeoclavulina apiahyna
- Phaeoclavulina arcosuensis
- Phaeoclavulina argentea
- Phaeoclavulina articulotela
- Phaeoclavulina aurantilaeta
- Phaeoclavulina bicolor
- Phaeoclavulina camellia
- Phaeoclavulina campestris
- Phaeoclavulina campoi
- Phaeoclavulina capucina
- Phaeoclavulina carovinacea
- Phaeoclavulina caroviridula
- Phaeoclavulina cervicornis
- Phaeoclavulina cinnamomea
- Phaeoclavulina clavarioides
- Phaeoclavulina cokeri
- Phaeoclavulina coniferarum
- Phaeoclavulina corrugata
- Phaeoclavulina curta
- Phaeoclavulina cyanocephala
- Phaeoclavulina decolor
- Phaeoclavulina decurrens
- Phaeoclavulina echinoflava
- Phaeoclavulina echinovirens
- Phaeoclavulina eumorpha
- Phaeoclavulina flaccida
- Phaeoclavulina gigantea
- Phaeoclavulina glauco-aromatica
- Phaeoclavulina grandis
- Phaeoclavulina griseobrunnea
- Phaeoclavulina guadelupensis
- Phaeoclavulina guyanensis
- Phaeoclavulina insignis
- Phaeoclavulina jilinensis
- Phaeoclavulina liliputiana
- Phaeoclavulina longicaulis
- Phaeoclavulina macrospora
- Phaeoclavulina minutispora
- Phaeoclavulina murrillii
- Phaeoclavulina mutabilis
- Phaeoclavulina myceliosa
- Phaeoclavulina nigricans
- Phaeoclavulina ochracea
- Phaeoclavulina pancaribbea
- Phaeoclavulina pseudozippelii
- Phaeoclavulina quercus-ilicis
- Phaeoclavulina retispora
- Phaeoclavulina roellinii
- Phaeoclavulina sikkimia
- Phaeoclavulina subclaviformis
- Phaeoclavulina subdecurrens
- Phaeoclavulina tropicalis
- Phaeoclavulina vinaceipes
- Phaeoclavulina viridis
- Phaeoclavulina yunnanensis
- Phaeoclavulina zealandica
- Phaeoclavulina zippelii
