= Araeocoryne =

Scientific classification
- Kingdom: Fungi
- Division: Basidiomycota
- Class: Agaricomycetes
- Order: Gomphales
- Family: Gomphaceae
- Genus: Araeocoryne; Corner

Type species
- Araeocoryne elegans Corner

Genus of fungi

Araeocoryne is a genus of fungi in the family Gomphaceae. The genus is monotypic, containing the single species Araeocoryne elegans, found in Malaysia.
