= Delentaria =

Scientific classification
- Kingdom: Fungi
- Division: Basidiomycota
- Class: Agaricomycetes
- Order: Gomphales
- Family: Gomphaceae
- Genus: Delentaria; Corner

Type species
- Delentaria decurva Corner

Genus of fungi

Delentaria is a genus of fungi in the family Gomphaceae. The genus is monotypic, containing the single species Delentaria decurva, found in Brazil.
