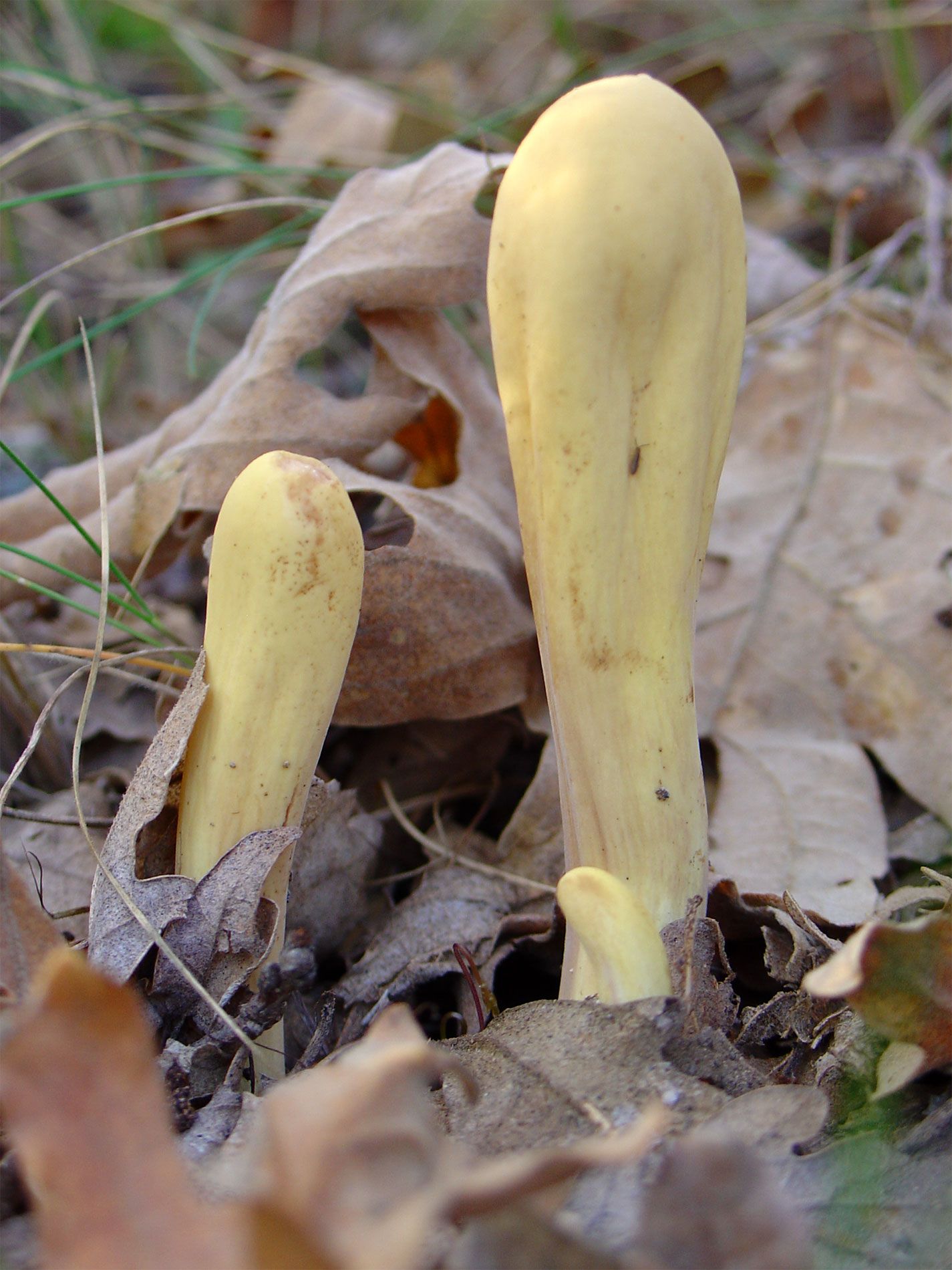
- Clavariadelphus pistillaris

Scientific classification
- Kingdom: Fungi
- Division: Basidiomycota
- Class: Agaricomycetes
- Order: Gomphales
- Family: Clavariadelphaceae
- Genus: Clavariadelphus; Donk (1933)

Type species
- Clavariadelphus pistillaris (L.) Donk (1933)

Species
- 35 species

= Clavariadelphus =

Genus of fungi

Clavariadelphus is a genus of fungi in the family Clavariadelphaceae in the order Gomphales. Morphologically its members can be described as club fungi with simple, erect and unbranched basidiomata, even if the clavarioid fungi are today not seen as a systematic group. Numbers of described and currently accepted species are constantly rising, this might be connected both to applied new techniques and due to previously understudied areas like China. As of March 2026 there are, depending on the source, either 31, 34 or 35 accepted species currently recognized.

== Description ==
Macroscopic characters

The basidiomata are usually club-shaped (sometimes with deviations), unbranched and upright with a blunt to rounded, sometimes more acute apex, mature specimens can be slightly hollow, their trama is white, soft and spongy, they have a medium to large size (from about 4 cm to about 20 cm), they show various rather pale coulours, and grow solitary, scattered or gregarious but very rarely cespitose or in fascicles.

Microscopic characters

The basidia have the spindle apparatus of the dividing diploid nucleus oriented orthogonally to their axis and shifted towards the tip, this makes the basidias shape being apically inflated; they bear 4 elliptic, smooth, hyaline and large (10—20 μm long) spores. The basidia and the spores can appear guttulate and lack crystalline structures. The hyphae of the trama have throughout the basidiocarp conspicuous clamps and they are imperfectly oriented to the longitudinal axis of the club-shaped basidiocarp, loosely interwoven and not adherent to each other.

== Distribution and Habitat ==
The genus has a widespread distribution in temperate and boreal areas of Eurasia and North America including more southern forested regions at high altitudes like around the Himalayas. According to species that are described a longer time ago both widespread and rather restricted single-species distributions exist.

Reported occurrences from the southern continents (excluding Antarctica) seem to be rare. Many of them are not identified to species level or have some issues. The majority of the reported occurrences on southern continents come from soil samples, including a whole bunch of occurrences in Australia inferred from 18S rRNA sequences and identified as Clavariadelphus pistillaris. However, the results of classical genetical short cut methods can be ambiguous for fungi, so it will be interesting to see if future studies (e.g., with genomics) will confirm the presence of Clavariadelphus on the southern hemisphere. For the identification of fungi by barcoding the ITS is recommended as a reliable sequence instead.

Clavariadelphus seems to be restricted to restricted to the surrounding of trees like, e.g. conifers and oaks, mainly in (rather moist and temperate) forests. There it grows mainly in the soil or on debris (like needles), either solitary, scattered or gregarious (in groups) - depending on species.

== Nutrition modes ==
Both saprotrophic and mycorrhizal nutrition modes have been reported.

== Etymology ==
The name of this genus is most likely a reference to the similar shaped other genus Clavaria (which is not closely related), in fact the first three species of Clavariadelphus were originally placed in Clavaria before Marinus Anton Donk established the new genus Clavariadelphus in 1933. It seems to be a composition of Clavari- and adelphos, which means brother in Latin; taken together this would mean something like "the brother of Clavaria". Clavaria is coming clava, Latin for club. However, Donk did not note anything about the name, so it is difficult to be certain. Theories that the latter part of the name would come from delphus (Greek for both uterus and dolphin and thus resulting overall in something like "uterus-shaped club") seem unlikely as this may have been worth a notice in the description of the genus.

== Species ==
- Clavariadelphus abetonensis Franchi & M. Marchetti 2025
- Clavariadelphus acuminatus X.L. Gao & P. Zhang 2025
- Clavariadelphus alpinus J. Zhao & L.P. Tang 2020
- Clavariadelphus americanus (Corner) Methven 1989
- Clavariadelphus amplus J. Zhao, L.P. Tang & Z.W. Ge 2020
- Clavariadelphus aurantiacus P. Zhang 2020
- Clavariadelphus caespitosus Methven 1989
- Clavariadelphus cokeri V.L.Wells & Kempton 1968
- Clavariadelphus elongatus J. Khan, Sher & Khalid 2018
- Clavariadelphus fasciculatus Methven & Guzmán 1989
- Clavariadelphus flavidus Methven 1989
- Clavariadelphus flavoimmaturus R.H.Petersen 1974
- Clavariadelphus gansuensis J. Zhao & L.P. Tang 2020
- Clavariadelphus griseoclavus L. Fan & L. Xia 2020
- Clavariadelphus griseoglaucus Franchi, M. Marchetti & Paoli 2022
- Clavariadelphus helveticus Rahm & Schild 1974
- Clavariadelphus himalayensis Methven 1989
- Clavariadelphus khinganensis J. Zhao, L.P. Tang & P. Zhang 2020
- Clavariadelphus lignicola R.H.Petersen 1974
- Clavariadelphus ligula (Schaeff.) Donk 1933
- Clavariadelphus miniatus P. Zhang & Mei J. Li 2025
- Clavariadelphus mirus (Pat.) Corner 1950
- Clavariadelphus mucronatus V.L.Wells & Kempton 1968
- Clavariadelphus occidentalis Methven 1989
- Clavariadelphus pakistanicus Hanif & Khalid 2014
- Clavariadelphus pallidoincarnatus Methven 1989
- Clavariadelphus pistillaris (L.) Donk 1933
- Clavariadelphus pseudoelongatus P. Zhang & Zuo H. Chen 2025
- Clavariadelphus sachalinensis (S.Imai) Corner 1950
- Clavariadelphus subfastigiatus V.L.Wells & Kempton 1968
- Clavariadelphus tenuis P. Zhang 2020
- Clavariadelphus truncatus (Quél.) Donk 1933
- Clavariadelphus unicolor (Berk. & Ravenel) Corner 1950
- Clavariadelphus xanthocephalus Rahm & Schild 1977
- Clavariadelphus yunnanensis Methven 1989
