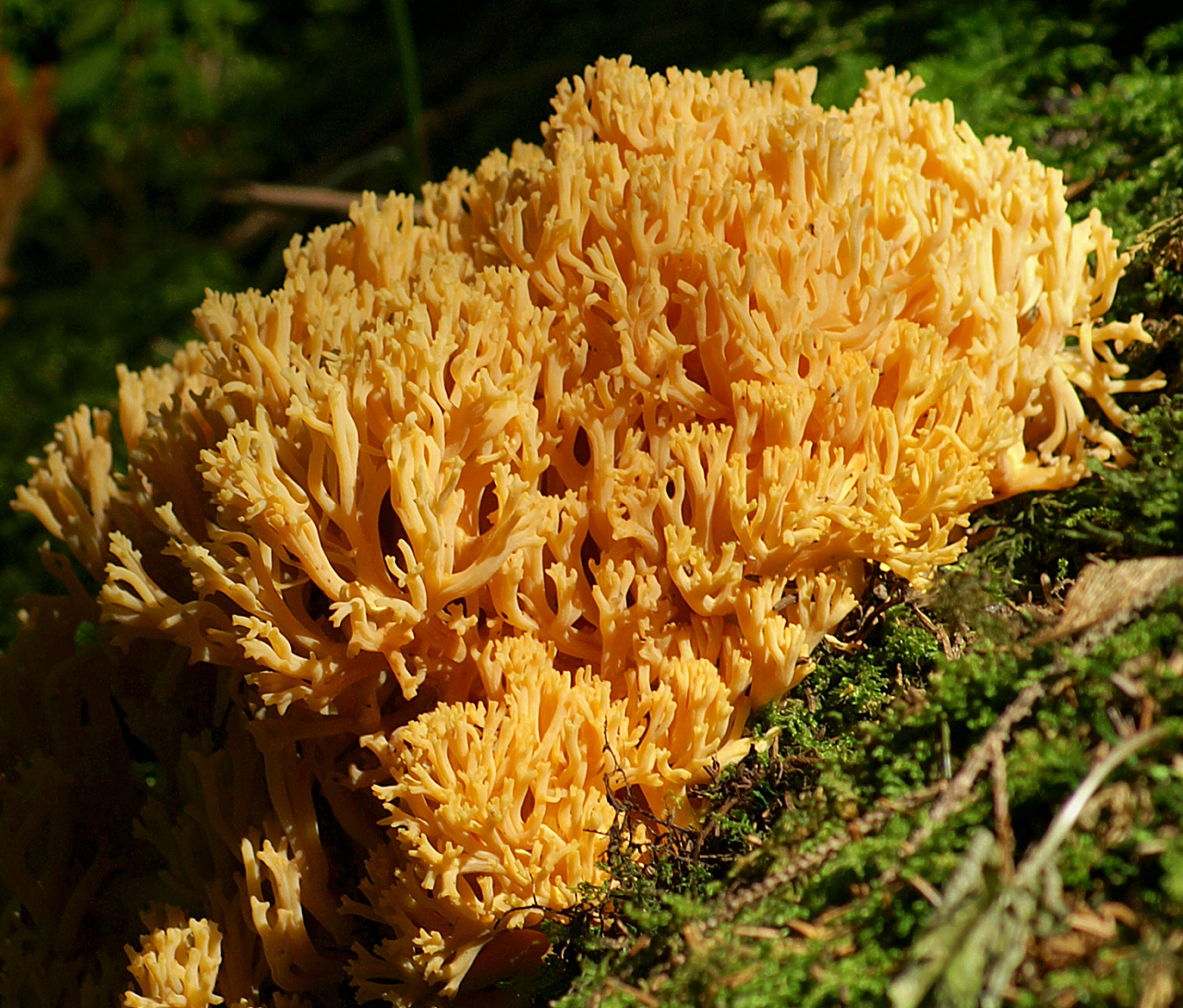

Scientific classification
- Domain: Eukaryota
- Kingdom: Fungi
- Division: Basidiomycota
- Class: Agaricomycetes
- Order: Gomphales
- Family: Gomphaceae
- Genus: Ramaria
- Species: R. aurea

Binomial name
- Ramaria aurea (Schaeff.) Quél. 1888

= Ramaria aurea =

Species of fungus

Ramaria aurea is a coral mushroom in the family Gomphaceae. It is found in North America and Europe. It is similar to R. flava; both species are edible.
