= G. graveolens =

G. graveolens may refer to:

- Gautieria graveolens, a fungus species
- Globifomes graveolens, a fungus species
