= Gautieria graveolens =

Scientific classification
- Kingdom: Fungi
- Division: Basidiomycota
- Class: Agaricomycetes
- Order: Gomphales
- Family: Gomphaceae
- Genus: Gautieria
- Species: G. graveolens

Binomial name
- Gautieria graveolens Vittad.

Species of fungus

Gautieria graveolens is a species of hypogeal fungus in the family Gomphaceae. It is found in forests in Central and Southern Europe. It was described by Carlo Vittadini in 1831.
