= Protogautieria =

Scientific classification
- Kingdom: Fungi
- Division: Basidiomycota
- Class: Agaricomycetes
- Order: Gomphales
- Family: Gomphaceae
- Genus: Protogautieria; A.H. Sm.

Type species
- Protogautieria lutea A.H. Sm.

Species
- P. lutea P. substriata

Genus of fungi

Protogautieria is a genus of fungi in the family Gomphaceae. The genus contains two species found in North America.
