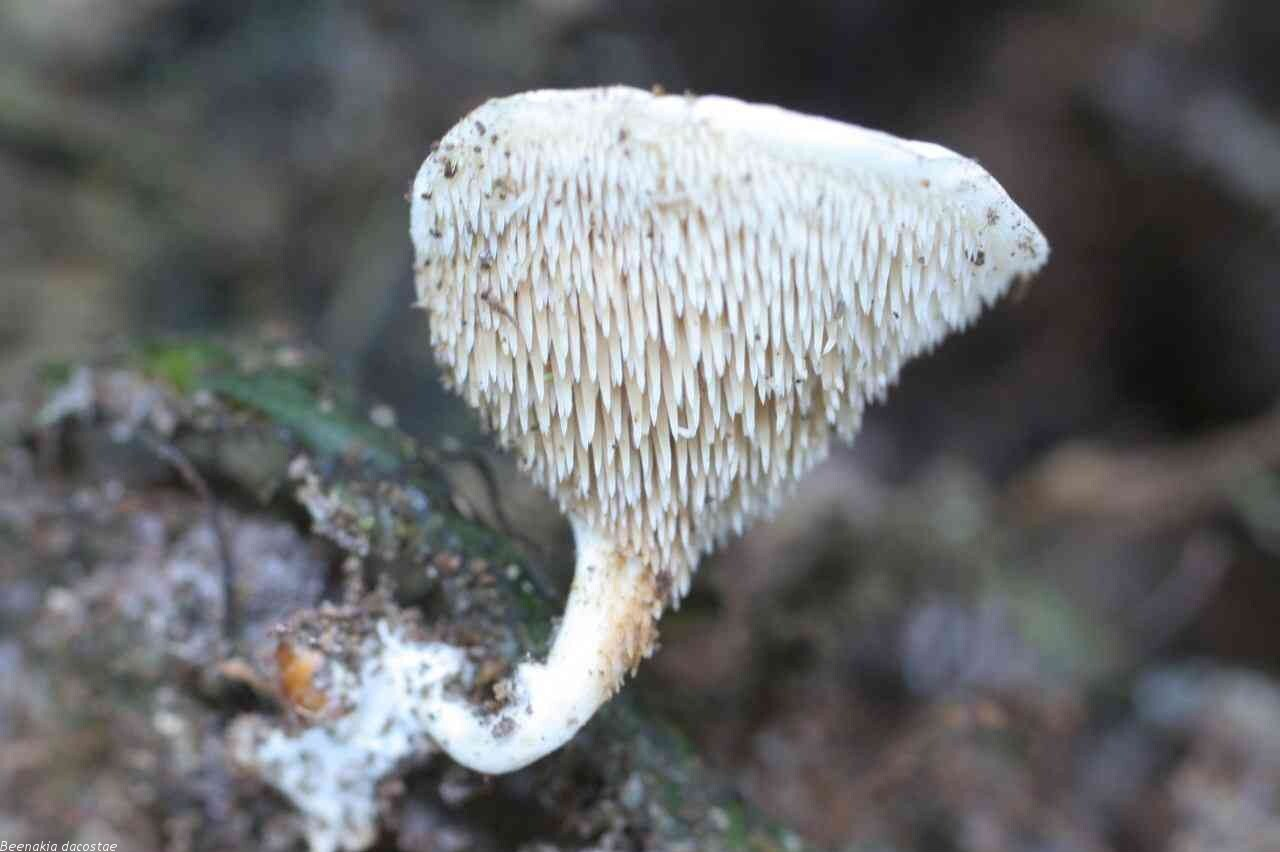
- Beenakia dacostae

Scientific classification
- Kingdom: Fungi
- Division: Basidiomycota
- Class: Agaricomycetes
- Order: Gomphales
- Family: Clavariadelphaceae
- Genus: Beenakia; D.A.Reid

Type species
- Beenakia dacostae D.A.Reid

Species
- B. dacostae B. fricta B. fuliginosa B. hololeuca B. informis B. mediterranea B. subglobospora

= Beenakia =

Genus of fungi

Beenakia is a genus of fungi in the Clavariadelphaceae family. The genus has a widespread distribution, and contains seven species.
