= Pseudogomphus =

Scientific classification
- Kingdom: Fungi
- Division: Basidiomycota
- Class: Agaricomycetes
- Order: Gomphales
- Family: Gomphaceae
- Genus: Pseudogomphus; R. Heim

Type species
- Pseudogomphus fragilissimus R. Heim & Gilles

Genus of fungi

Pseudogomphus is a genus of fungi in the family Gomphaceae. A monotypic genus, it contains the single species Pseudogomphus fragilissimus, found in Gabon.
