= Ramaricium =

Scientific classification
- Kingdom: Fungi
- Division: Basidiomycota
- Class: Agaricomycetes
- Order: Gomphales
- Family: Gomphaceae
- Genus: Ramaricium; J. Erikss.

Type species
- Ramaricium occultum J. Erikss.

Species
- R. albo-ochraceum R. alboflavescens R. flavomarginatum

Genus of fungi

Ramaricium is a genus of fungi in the family Gomphaceae. The genus contains three species that collectively have a widespread distribution.
