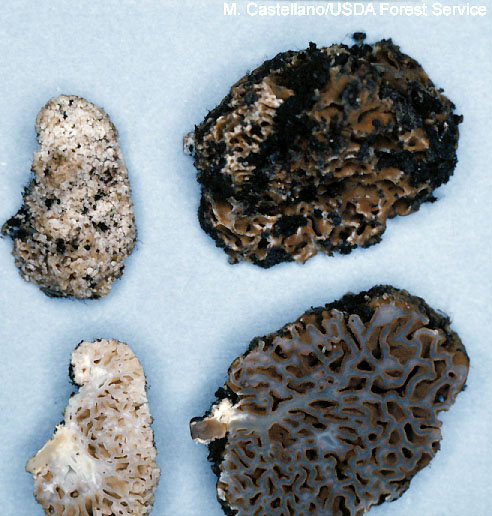
- Gautieria magnicellaris

Scientific classification
- Domain: Eukaryota
- Kingdom: Fungi
- Division: Basidiomycota
- Class: Agaricomycetes
- Order: Gomphales
- Family: Gomphaceae
- Genus: Gautieria; Vittad. (1831)

Type species
- Gautieria morchelliformis Vittad. (1831)

Synonyms
- Ciliciocarpus Corda (1831); Hydnospongos Wallr. (1839); Uslaria Nieuwl. (1916)

= Gautieria =

Genus of fungi

Gautieria is a genus of hypogeal fungi in the family Gomphaceae. They form mycorrhizae with various tree species, mostly from the family Pinaceae. Species are present over much of the world's temperate and boreal forest habitats. It is well documented that species from this genera are an important part of the diet of the northern flying squirrel (Glaucomys sabrinus). Also, some Australian marsupials, especially the rat-kangaroos, feed extensively on these fungi. The fungi also benefit from this relationship: not only do the squirrels help to disperse the spores and propagate the species, studies suggest that passage through the digestive tract of a mammal promotes germination of spores.

== Taxonomy ==
The genus name of Gautieria is in honour of Joseph (Giuseppe) Gautieri (1769 - 1833), who was an Italian doctor and naturalist from Novara.

The genus was first described by Italian doctor and naturalist Carlo Vittadini within Monogr. Vol.25. in 1831. for hypogeous (below-ground) gasteromycetes with chambers exposed to the surface and lined with a spore-bearing hymenium, a basal rhizomorph, and ovoid-fusiform, striate-grooved spores. Vittadini's original concept was based on two species he collected in Italy, Gauteria morchellaeformis and Gautieria graveolens. In 1918, Zeller and Dodge examined various dried herbarium collections of Gautieria, and recognized five species. Additional research led to them recognizing 34 species and expanding their generic concept to include species with a well-developed peridium of periclinal hyphae at maturity. As of 2008, Gautieria is thought to contain 25 species.

== Description ==
Fruit bodies (gasterocarps) are typically roughly spherical in shape, with a persisting single or branched rhizomorph. The columella (the central sterile portion of the sporangium) are variable in size and shape. The peridium (the wall of the sporangium) is thin and short-lasting. The gleba is initially white, but later becomes colored by the masses of spores. The basidia are club-shaped, usually two-spored, and with long filiform sterigmata. Spores are 12–26 μm long, and ovoid to ellipsoid in shape.

== Species ==
- Gautieria caudata (Harkn.) Zeller & C.W.Dodge (1934)
- Gautieria chengdensis J.Z.Ying (1984)
- Gautieria chilensis Zeller & C.W.Dodge (1934)
- Gautieria clelandii G.Cunn. (1941)
- Gautieria costata G.Cunn. (1938)
- Gautieria crispa E.L.Stewart & Trappe (1984)
- Gautieria drummondii Cooke (1892)
- Gautieria fuegiana E. Horak (1964)
- Gautieria gautierioides (Lloyd) Zeller & C.W.Dodge (1934)
- Gautieria graveolens Vittad. (1831)

- Gautieria graveolens f. graveolens Vittad. (1831)
- Gautieria graveolens f. inodora A.H.Sm. & Solheim (1953)
- Gautieria graveolens var. graveolens Vittad. (1831)

- Gautieria harknessii Zeller & C.W.Dodge (1934)
- Gautieria inapire Palfner & E.Horak (2001)
- Gautieria macrospora G.Cunn. (1935)
- Gautieria magnicellaris (Pilát) E.L.Stewart & Trappe (1992)
- Gautieria mexicana (E.Fisch.) Zeller & C.W.Dodge (1934)
- Gautieria microspora Rodway (1929)
- Gautieria monospora G.W.Beaton, Pegler & T.W.K.Young (1985)
- Gautieria monticola Harkn. (1884)
- Gautieria morchelliformis Vittad. (1831)

- Gautieria morchelliformis var. globispora Pilát (1958)
- Gautieria morchelliformis var. magnicellaris Pilát (1953)
- Gautieria morchelliformis var. microspora Wichanský (1962)
- Gautieria morchelliformis var. morchelliformis Vittad. (1831)
- Gautieria morchelliformis var. stenospora Pilát (1958)

- Gautieria novae-zelandiae G. Cunn. (1938)
- Gautieria otthii Trog (1857)
- Gautieria pallida Harkn. (1934)
- Gautieria parksiana Zeller & C.W.Dodge (1922)
- Gautieria plumbea Zeller & C.W.Dodge (1918)
- Gautieria pseudovestita Malençon (1976)
- Gautieria queenslandica J.W.Cribb (1958)
- Gautieria retirugosa Fr. (1909)
- Gautieria sinensis J.Z.Ying (1995)
- Gautieria tasmanica Rodway (1929)
- Gautieria tasmanica G.Cunn. (1938)
- Gautieria trabutii (Chatin) Pat. (1897)
- Gautieria villosa Quél. (1878)
- Gautieria xinjiangensis
