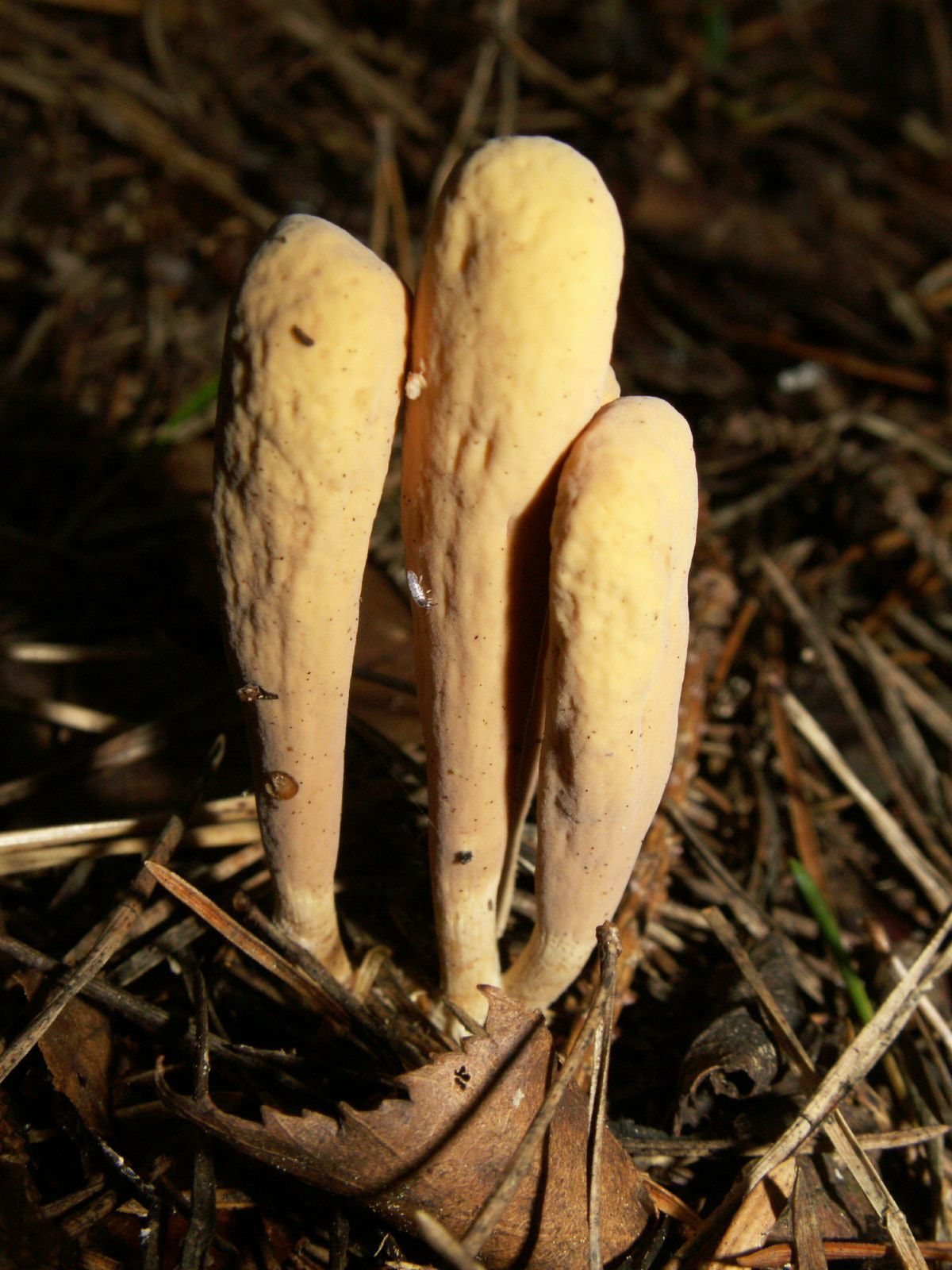

Conservation status
- Secure (NatureServe)

Scientific classification
- Kingdom: Fungi
- Division: Basidiomycota
- Class: Agaricomycetes
- Order: Gomphales
- Family: Clavariadelphaceae
- Genus: Clavariadelphus
- Species: C. ligula

Binomial name
- Clavariadelphus ligula (Schaeff.) Donk (1933)

Synonyms
- Clavaria ligula Schaeff. (1774); Clavaria ophioglossoides Batsch (1783)

= Clavariadelphus ligula =

Species of fungus

- Mycological characteristics
- Smooth hymenium
- No distinct cap
- Hymenium attachment is irregular or not applicable
- Stipe is bare
- Spore print is white
- Ecology is mycorrhizal
- Edibility is unknown

Clavariadelphus ligula, commonly known as the strap coral, is a species of fungus in the family Gomphaceae. It produces club-shaped fruit bodies with spongy flesh that grow in groups on the forest floor. It is found in Eurasia and North America.

== Taxonomy ==
The species was first described by the German naturalist Jacob Christian Schaeffer in 1774 as Clavaria ligula. It was first placed in Clavariadelphus by Marinus Anton Donk in 1933. Clavaria ophioglossoides, described by August Batsch in 1783, is considered a synonym.

The fungus is commonly known as the "strap coral". The specific epithet ligula is derived from the Latin word for "shoestring".

== Description ==
The club portion of the fruit body is buff to pale yellow or reddish, straight, and has stiff hairs at the base. The surface is dull and does not have hairs. It is smooth at first then later becomes somewhat wrinkled. It is club-shaped to spoon-shaped and up to 12 cm (4.7 in) tall by 2 cm (0.8 in) wide at the thickest part. The stipe is not distinct except for the hairs at the base. The flesh is whitish, and does not change color with bruising. It is somewhat spongy in the upper part, but firm below. The flesh has no odor, and its taste is slightly bitter. The surface tissue turns green upon the application of a solution of ferric sulphate, and yellow with a dilute solution of potassium hydroxide.

The spores are pale yellowish orange ("light buff") in deposit. Additional features may be discerned using light microscopy; they are smooth, narrowly ellipsoid, and measure 8–15 by 3–6 μm. The hyphae are monomitic, and clamp connections are present. Cystidia are absent.

One field guide lists the species as edible, while others say it is inedible.

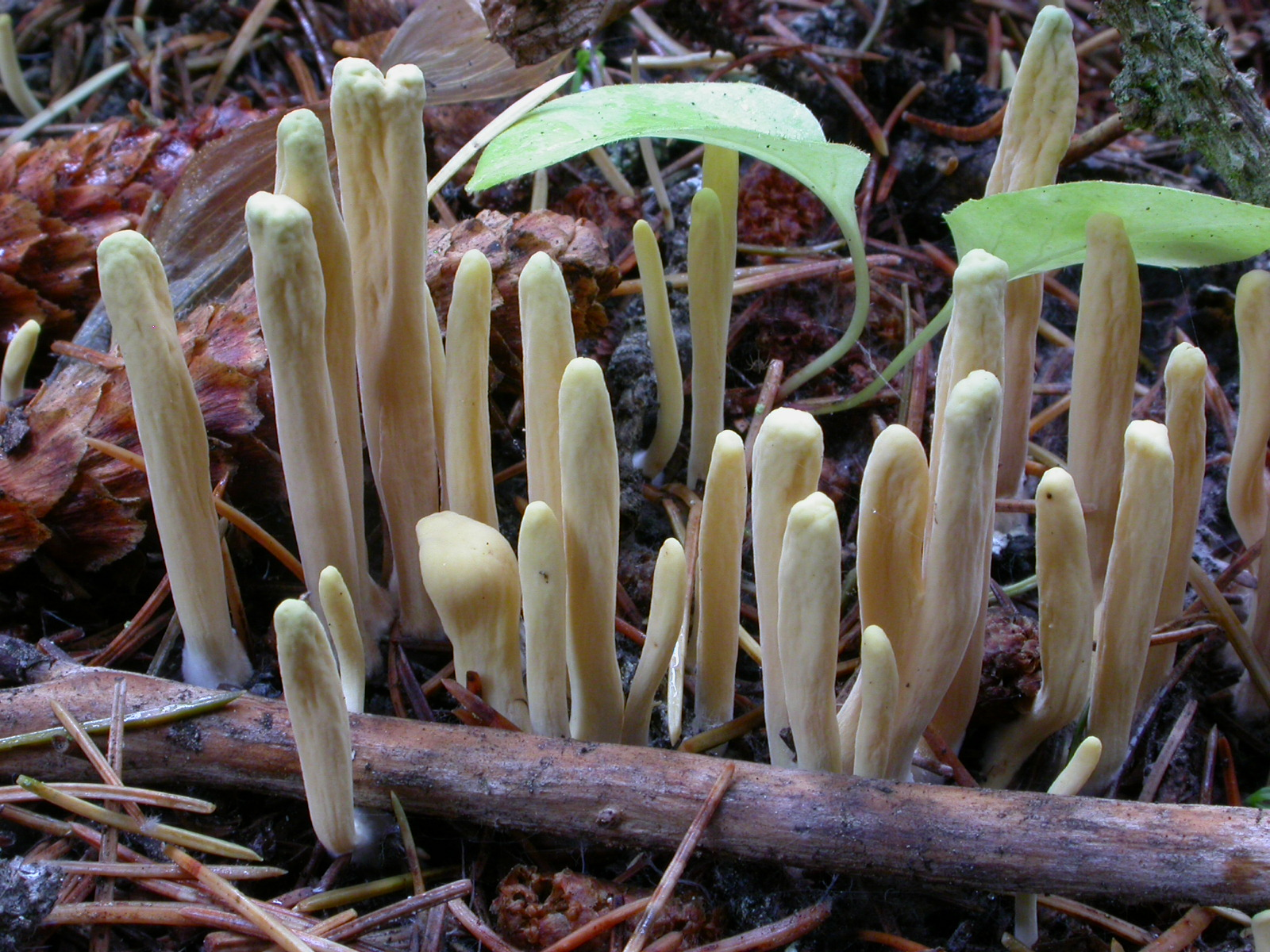
Typical growth habit

=== Similar species ===
Clavariadelphus sachalinensis is macroscopically identical to C. ligula and can be distinguished only by its larger spores, measuring 16–24 by 4–6 μm, and longer basidia. However, intermediate forms are often found, and they may represent the same species. Clavaria flavipes is another similar species, but in addition to being smaller and more pale yellow than C. ligula, it also has broader spores.

== Habitat and distribution ==
The fruit bodies of C. ligula grow gregariously (closely scattered over small areas) on the ground, in forest duff. They are widespread and common in coniferous forests, fruiting in the summer and fall.

The species has been collected in the Czech Republic, in Austria (data in), the Magadan region of the Russian Far East as well as the arctic zone of the Urals. It has also been collected in the conifer-dominated forests in Kashmir Valley in India. In North America, the distribution extends north to Canada.
