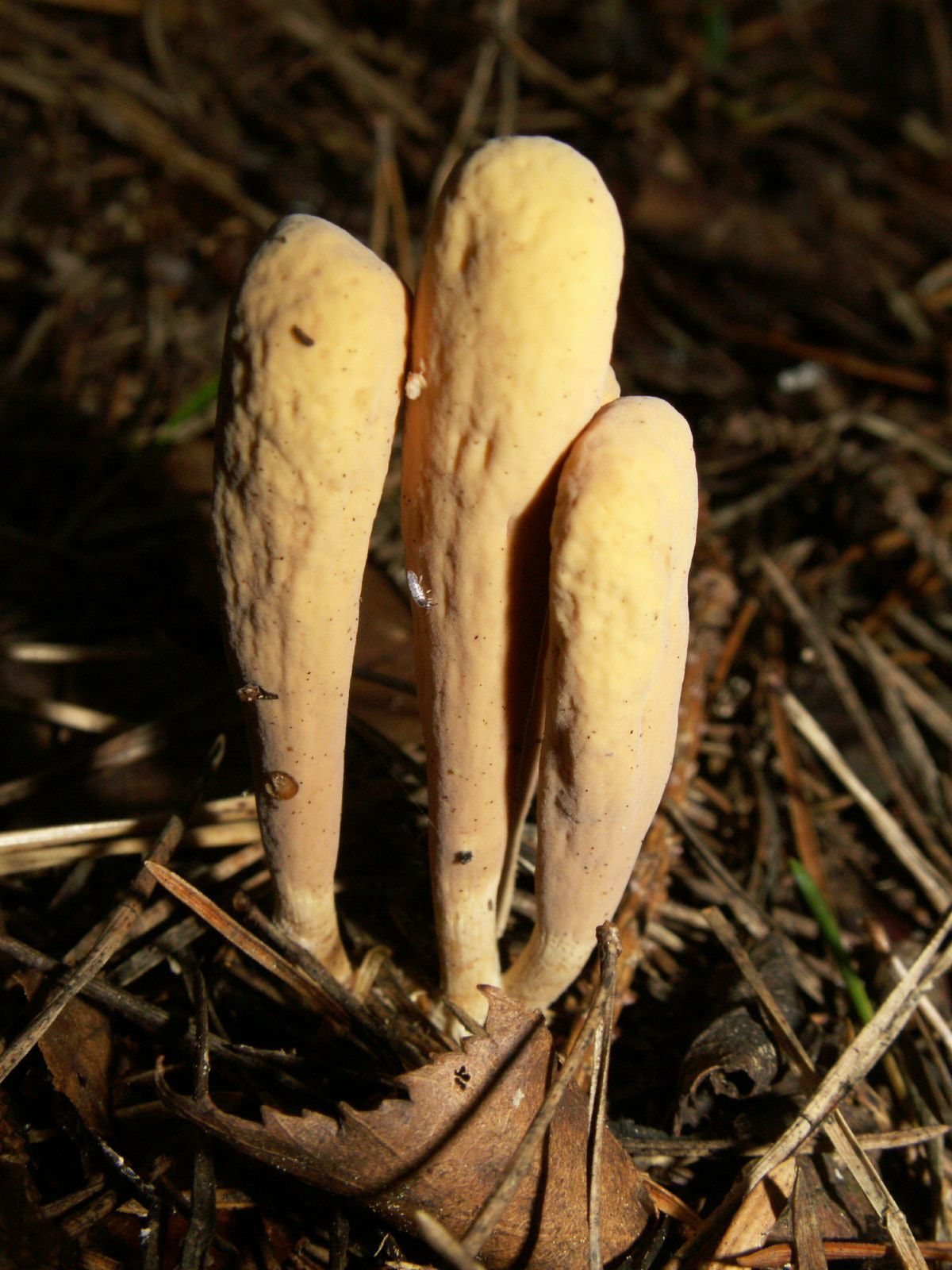
- Clavariadelphus ligula

Scientific classification
- Kingdom: Fungi
- Division: Basidiomycota
- Class: Agaricomycetes
- Order: Gomphales
- Family: Clavariadelphaceae; Corner

Type genus
- Clavariadelphus Donk

Genera
- Beenakia; Clavariadelphus

= Clavariadelphaceae =

Family of fungi

The Clavariadelphaceae are a family of fungi belonging in what is classically known as the Gomphales order, or cladistically as the gomphoid-phalloid clade. First described by British botanist E.J.H. Corner in 1970, the family has 2 genera and 26 species.
