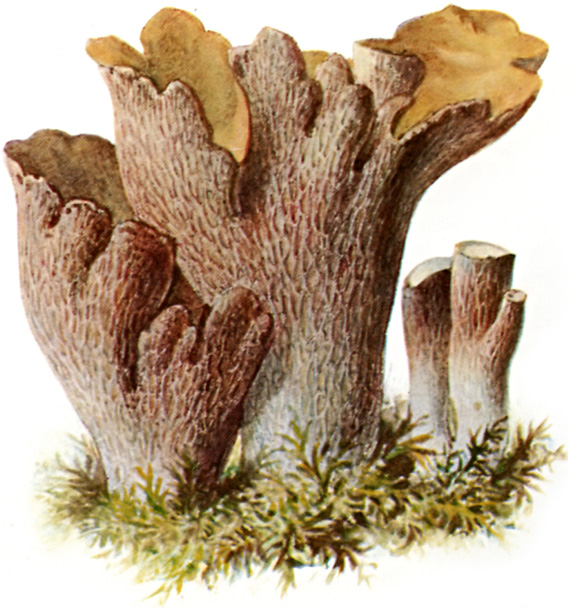
- Gomphus clavatus Albin Schmalfuß, 1897

Scientific classification
- Kingdom: Fungi
- Division: Basidiomycota
- Class: Agaricomycetes
- Order: Gomphales
- Family: Gomphaceae; Donk (1961)

Type genus
- Gomphus Pers. (1794)

Genera
- Araeocoryne; Austrogautieria; Ceratellopsis; Delentaria; Destuntzia; Gautieria; Gloeocantharellus; Gomphus; Phaeoclavulina; Protogautieria; Pseudogomphus; Ramaria; Ramaricium; Terenodon; Turbinellus

= Gomphaceae =

Family of fungi

The Gomphaceae are a diverse family of fungi belonging in what is classically known as the Phallales or cladistically as the gomphoid-phalloid clade. In 2008, the family had 13 genera and 287 species.
