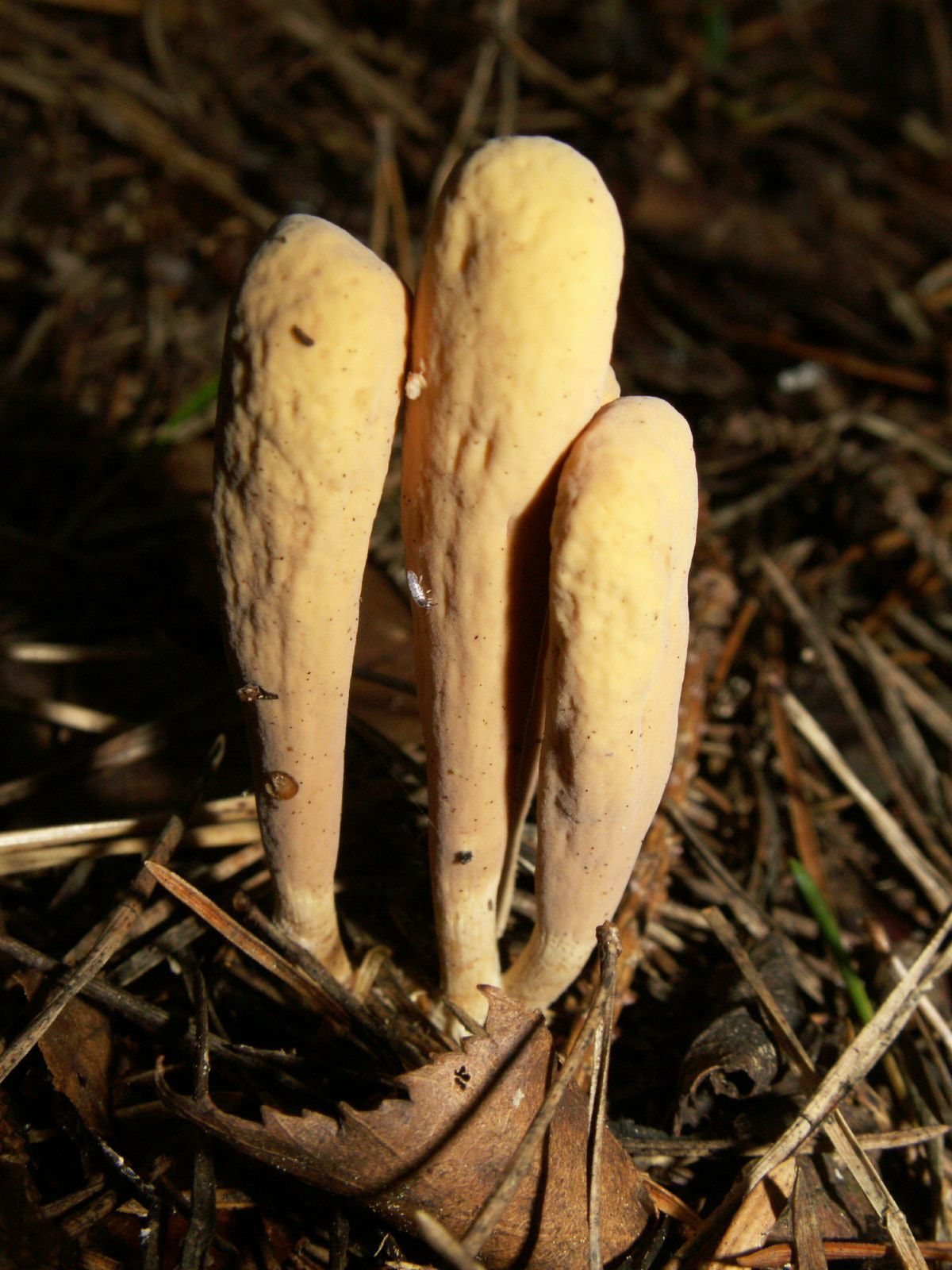
- Clavariadelphus ligula

Scientific classification
- Domain: Eukaryota
- Kingdom: Fungi
- Division: Basidiomycota
- Class: Agaricomycetes
- Subclass: Phallomycetidae
- Order: Gomphales; Jülich, 1981

Families
- Clavariadelphaceae; Gomphaceae; Lentariaceae

= Gomphales =

Order of fungi

The Gomphales are an order of basidiomycete fungi. Some or all families belonging to Gomphales have been sometimes included in the order Phallales (and vice versa - they are also sometimes treated as synonyms), the now-obsolete Ramariaceae was also previously included in Cantharellales. Recent phylogenetic analyses include in Gomphales the families of the original description of the order by Walter Jülich, with addition of Clavariadelphaceae. According to one 2008 estimate, the Gomphales contain 18 genera and 336 species.
