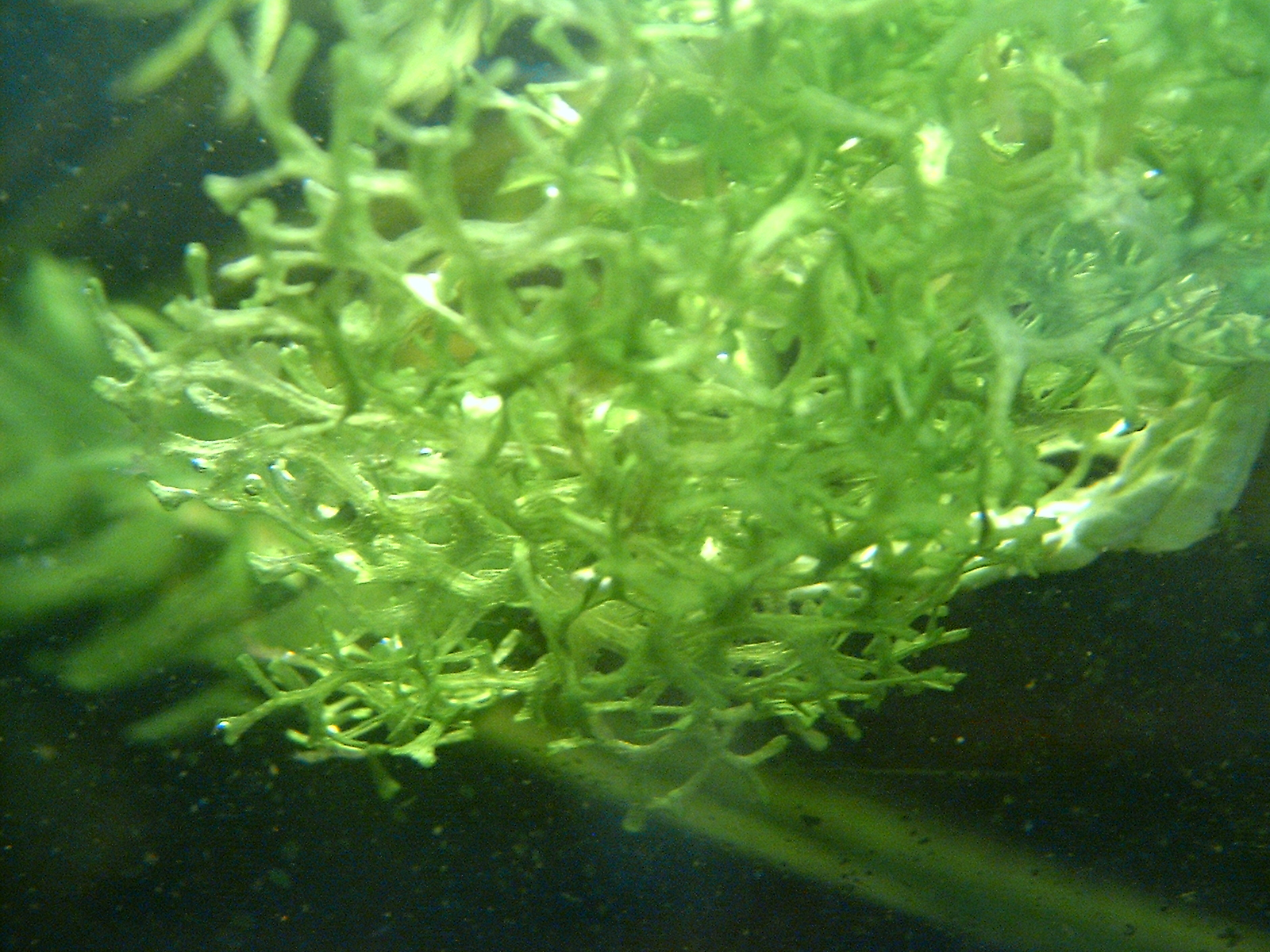

Conservation status
- Least Concern (IUCN 3.1) (Europe regional assessment)

Scientific classification
- Kingdom: Plantae
- Division: Marchantiophyta
- Class: Marchantiopsida
- Order: Marchantiales
- Family: Ricciaceae
- Genus: Riccia
- Species: R. fluitans

Binomial name
- Riccia fluitans L.

Varieties
- Riccia fluitans var. fluitans; Riccia fluitans var. reticulata Herzog

Synonyms
- List: Ricciella fluitans (L.) A.Braun; Riccardia dichotoma Gray; Ricciella fluitans var. hydrophila Huebener; Riccia eudichotoma var. fluitans (L.) Bisch.; Riccia fluitans var. minor Lindenb.; Riccia fluitans f. minor (Lindenb.) Nees; Riccia fluitans var. lata Gottsche, Lindenb. & Nees; Riccia fluitans var. nana Grognot; Riccia fluitans var. aquatica T.Jensen; Riccia canaliculata var. fluitans (L.) Lindb.; Riccia centrifuga Arnell; Ricciella minor (Lindenb.) Trevis.; Riccia fluitans f. lata Underw.; Riccia fluitans f. terrestris Underw.; Riccia fluitans var. pallida Grognot ex Roum.; Riccia fluitans var. viridescens Roum.; Riccia fluitans f. gracilis Bouvet; Riccia fluitans f. aquatica (T.Jensen) C.E.O.Jensen; Ricciella fluitans f. terrestris Casares-Gil; Ricciella fluitans var. birmensis Lamothe; Ricciella fluitans var. terrestris Lamothe; Riccia canaliculata f. fluitans (L.) Fam.; Fysonia tenera Kashyap; Riccia fluitans f. limicola Sim; Ricciella fluitans f. robusta Papp; Riccia media Klingm.; Riccia fluitans subf. lata (Gottsche, Lindenb. & Nees) Kavina; Riccia fluitans f. fluitans; Ricciella fluitans f. fluitans; Riccia fluitans subsp. fluitans; Ricciella fluitans var. fluitans

= Riccia fluitans =

Species of liverwort

Riccia fluitans, the floating crystalwort, is an aquatic floating plant of the liverwort genus Riccia which is popular among aquarists as a retreat for young fry and is used in live-bearing tanks. It can be found floating in ponds, and often forms thick mats on and under the water surface.

It normally grows quickly at the surface. When kept about two to three inches below an ordinary fluorescent bulb or in a pond exposed to full sunlight, it will form dense, bright green mats. Any single branch or antler bud can reproduce into a large colony if the plant is kept in proper conditions. It normally floats, but can also be attached to underwater objects such as logs and rocks. It can be attached with plastic mesh.

Floating crystalwort is generally not compatible with duckweeds, as they cover the surface of the water quite rapidly, crowding the Riccia out. It is easily overtaken by hair algae.

The species epithet fluitans is Latin for floating.

The species is sold for use in aquariums. Its floating branches provide habitat for both small invertebrates and the fish that feed on them.
