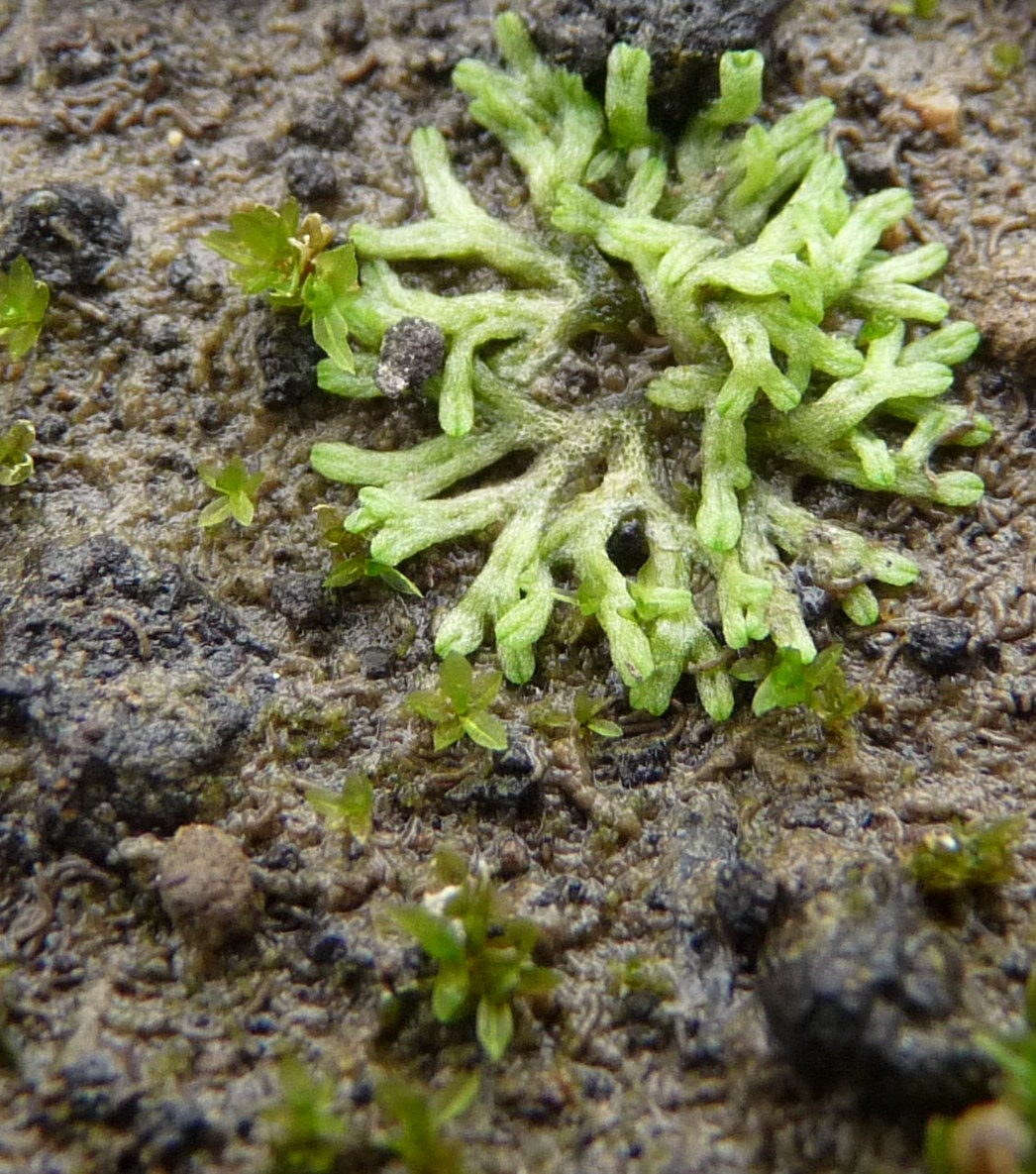

Conservation status
- Least Concern (IUCN 3.1) (Europe regional assessment)

- Apparently Secure (NatureServe)

Scientific classification
- Kingdom: Plantae
- Division: Marchantiophyta
- Class: Marchantiopsida
- Order: Marchantiales
- Family: Ricciaceae
- Genus: Riccia
- Species: R. huebeneriana

Binomial name
- Riccia huebeneriana Lindenb.

Subspecies
- Riccia huebeneriana subsp. huebeneriana; Riccia huebeneriana subsp. sullivantii (Austin ex Peck) R.M.Schust.

Synonyms
- Species: Riccia klinggraeffii Gottsche; Ricciella huebeneriana (Lindenb.) Dumort.; Riccia huebeneri Lindb.; Riccia fluitans f. major H.Klinggr.; Riccia fluitans var. purpurascens H.Klinggr.; Ricciella fluitans f. purpurascens (H.Klinggr.) Warnst.; Riccia huebeneriana f. purpurea Schiffn.; Riccia huebeneriana f. viridis Schiffn.; Riccia huebeneriana var. pseudofrostii Schiffn.; Riccia pseudofrostii (Schiffn.) Müll.Frib.; Riccia huebeneriana f. platyphylla Kavina; Ricciella pseudofrostii (Schiffn.) Casares-Gil; Riccia fluitans f. minor H.Klinggr.; Riccia huebeneriana f. huebeneriana; Ricciella huebeneriana var. huebeneriana; Riccia huebeneriana var. huebeneriana; subsp. sullivantii: Riccia sullivantii Austin ex Peck; Ricciella sullivantii (Austin ex Peck) A.Evans; Riccia fluitans var. sullivantii (Austin ex Peck) J.Wolf & E.Hall

= Riccia huebeneriana =

Species of liverwort

Riccia huebeneriana is a species of liverwort belonging to the family Ricciaceae.

It is native to Eurasia and Northern America.
