= Whittlesford - Thriplow Hummocky Fields =

Nature reserve in Cambridgeshire, England

Coordinates: 52.115°N 0.112°E

- Site of Special Scientific Interest
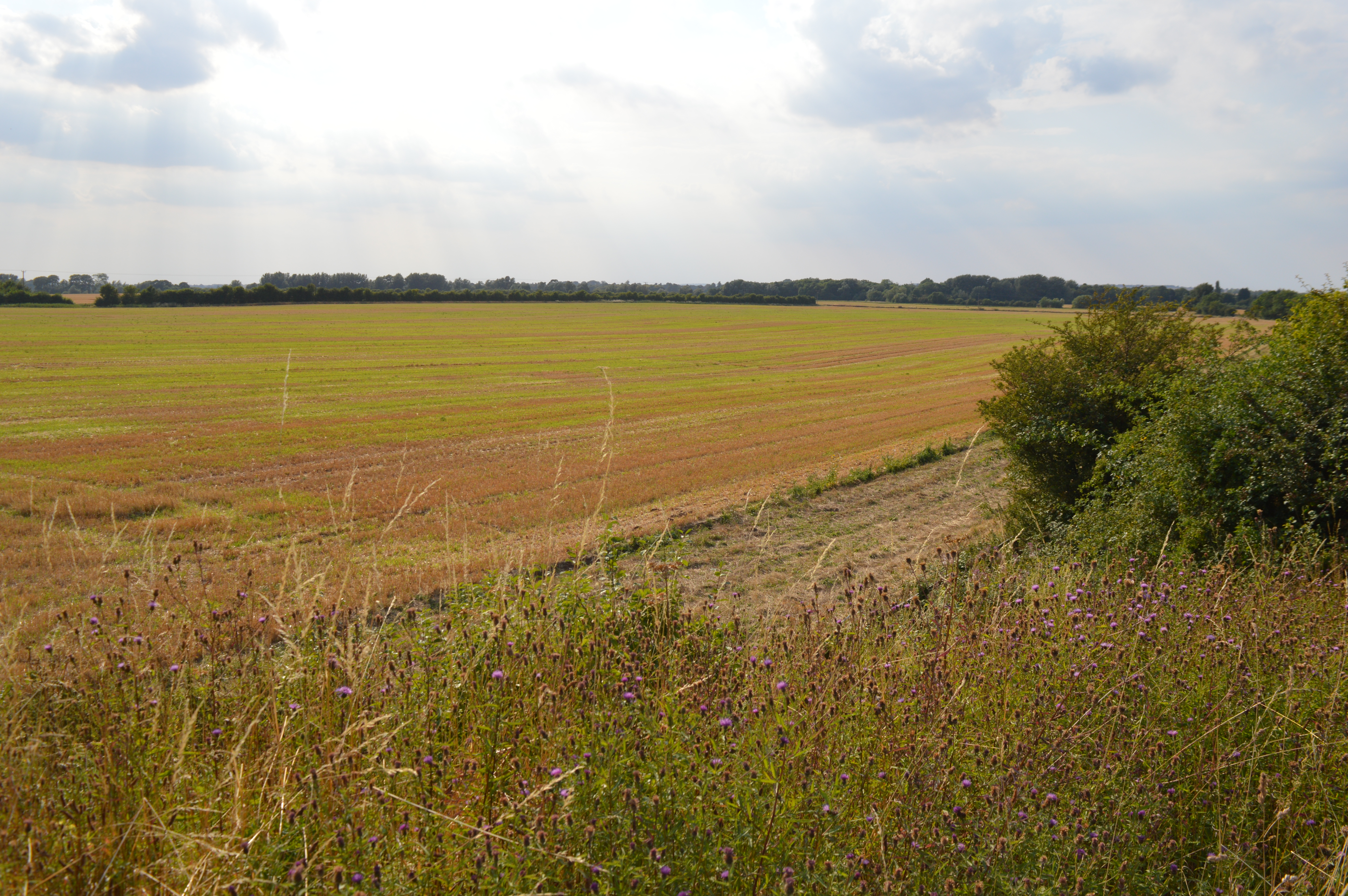
- Location of Whittlesford - Thriplow Hummocky Fields.
- Area of search: Cambridgeshire
- Grid reference: TL 447 484
- Interest: Biological
- Area: 55.6 ha (137 acres)
- Notification date: 1987
- Location map: Magic Map

Whittlesford - Thriplow Hummocky Fields is a 55.6-hectare (137-acre) biological Site of Special Scientific Interest between Whittlesford and Thriplow in Cambridgeshire, England. This site has two unusual species: the nationally rare grass-poly, which is only found in south Cambridgeshire on the British mainland, and the nationally uncommon fairy shrimp Chirocephalus diaphanus. They are found in shallow hollows in arable fields, which are the result of ice lenses melting at the end of the last ice age. There are also uncommon liverworts.

== The site ==
This site consists of two fields, one at Whittlesford and one at Thriplow with a total area of 55.6 ha (137.4 acres). This region was affected by the most recent ice age, and it left behind depressions which resulted from the melting of ice lenses, where the freezing of water-saturated soil causes deformation and the upward thrust of the ground surface. These depressions provide suitable habitat for grass-poly (Lythrum hyssopifolia), a very rare plant in Great Britain. Other plants growing in this specialised habitat include toad rush (Juncus bufonius), greater plantain (Plantago major), knotgrass (Polygonum aviculare), redshank (Persicaria maculosa) and the very local tasteless water-pepper (Persicaria mitis). There are also some uncommon liverworts at the site; Riccia cavernosa, Riccia warnstorfii and Riccia subbifurca. There is a requirement for both flooding and ploughing of the site to maintain this specialised community and provide suitable conditions for it to continue.

Another rarity found at this site is the fairy shrimp (Chirocephalus diaphanus), here at the most northerly end of its range, a crustacean, protected under the Wildlife and Countryside Act 1981. Its eggs can survive desiccation and hatch when the depressions fill with water.
