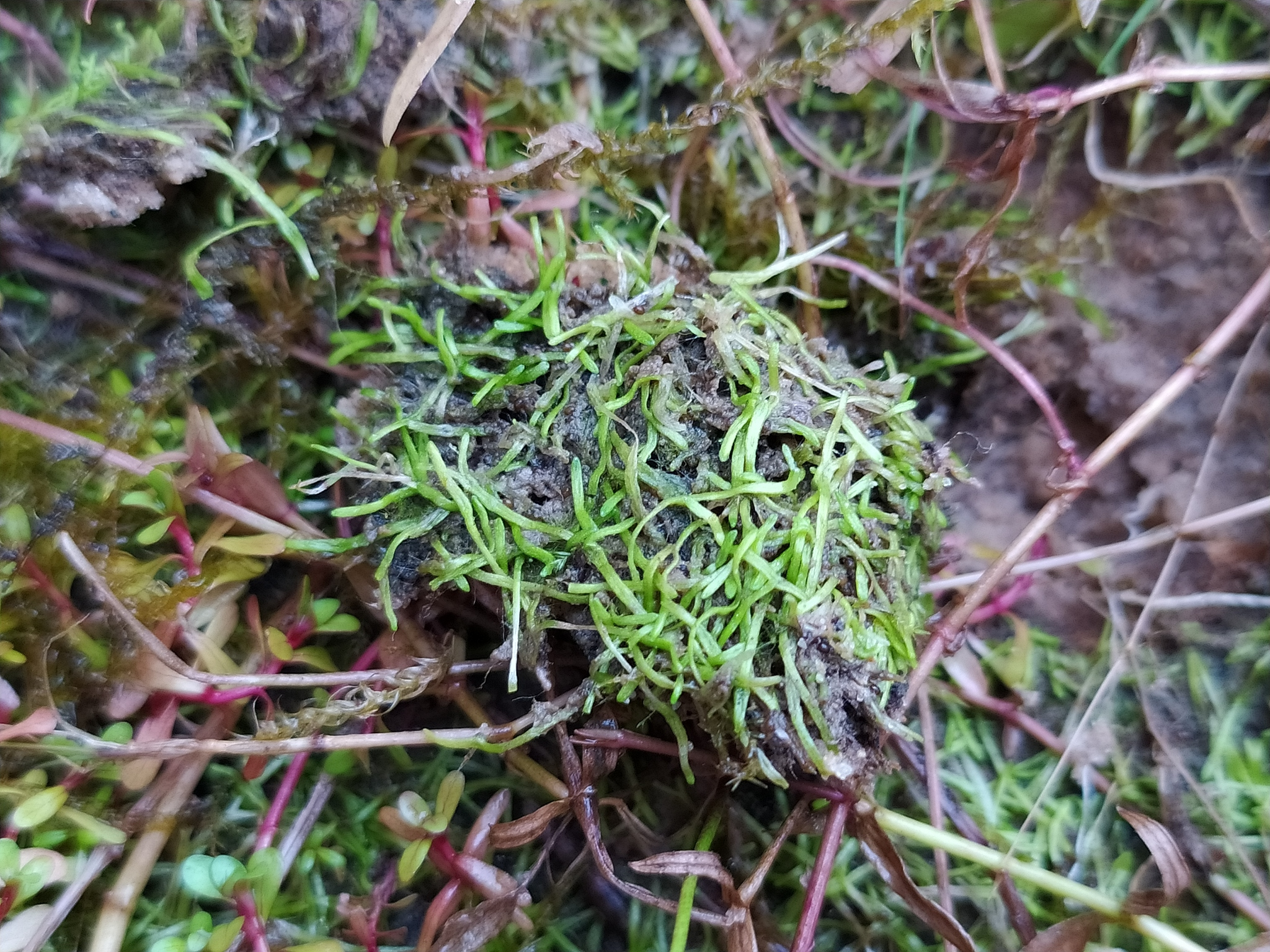
- Channelled Crystalwort (Riccia canaliculata)

Conservation status
- Least Concern (IUCN 3.1) (Europe regional assessment)

- Secure (NatureServe)

Scientific classification
- Kingdom: Plantae
- Division: Marchantiophyta
- Class: Marchantiopsida
- Order: Marchantiales
- Family: Ricciaceae
- Genus: Riccia
- Species: R. canaliculata

Binomial name
- Riccia canaliculata Hoffm.

Synonyms
- List: Riccia fluitans var. canaliculata (Hoffm.) Roth; Riccia nodosa Boucher ex DC.; Ricciella canaliculata (Hoffm.) A.Braun; Ricciella fluitans var. geophila Huebener; Riccia eudichotoma Bisch.; Riccia eudichotoma var. canaliculata (Hoffm.) Bisch.; Ricciella heyeri Huebener ex Genth; Riccia fluitans f. canaliculata (Hoffm.) Nees; Ricciella fluitans var. canaliculata (Hoffm.) Hartm.; Riccia fluitans subsp. canaliculata (Hoffm.) Ångstr.; Riccia fluitans var. terrestris Grognot; Ricciella nodosa (Boucher ex DC.) Dumort.; Riccia fluitans f. nodosa (Boucher ex DC.) Underw.; Riccia fluitans f. terrestris C.E.O.Jensen; Riccia fluitans subf. canaliculata (Hoffm.) Kavina; Riccia fluitans subf. eudichotoma Kavina; Riccia fluitans subf. canaliculata (Hoffm.) Kavina

= Riccia canaliculata =

Species of liverwort

Riccia canaliculata is a species of liverwort belonging to the family Ricciaceae.

It is native to Europe and Northern America.
