= Riccia atlantica =

Conservation status
- Critically Endangered (IUCN 3.1)

Scientific classification
- Kingdom: Plantae
- Division: Marchantiophyta
- Class: Marchantiopsida
- Order: Marchantiales
- Family: Ricciaceae
- Genus: Riccia
- Species: R. atlantica

Binomial name
- Riccia atlantica Sérgio & Perold

Species of liverwort

Riccia atlantica is a rare species of liverwort in the family Ricciaceae. It is endemic to the Madeira archipelago and the Savage Islands in Portugal. Its natural habitat is rocky shores.

== Taxonomy ==
Riccia atlantica was first scientifically described in 1992 by Cécilia Loff Pereira Sérgio Costa Gomes and Sarie Magdalena Perold. The type specimen (holotype: LISU; isotype: MADJ) was collected at Ponta de S. Lourenço, Nossa Senhora de Piedade, Madeira, at an elevation of 50–60 m. The species is classified within subgenus Riccia, section Riccia.

== Description ==
Riccia atlantica is a small, annual liverwort that forms rosettes up to 10 mm wide. When fresh, the plant appears pale green with a distinctive shiny, crystalline surface texture due to its specialised surface (epithelial) cells. These cells are distinctly large, globe-shaped, and arranged in one or two layers.

The individual branches of the plant are 3–6 mm long, 0.5–1.0 mm wide, and 0.3–0.5 mm thick. They fork once or twice symmetrically to form a Y-shape. In cross-section, each branch is flat on the bottom and rounded on top, being about 2 to 2.5 times wider than thick. The edges are rounded and blunt. When dry, the plant's edges curl slightly inward.

The reproductive structures are separated by gender (dioicous), with male and female organs occurring on different plants. The male structures (antheridia) appear in groups of 4–6 along the plant's midline, with their necks projecting about 450 micrometres. Each branch typically contains 2–3 spore-producing capsules (sporangia). The spores are triangular-globular in shape, measuring 70–80 micrometres in diameter, and have a distinctive pattern of hexagonal compartments on their surface.

The species is distinguished from its relatives by several features: its lack of protective hairs (cilia), its very small, transparent scales on the underside that do not reach the plant's edges, and its unique spore ornamentation pattern.

== Habitat and distribution ==
Riccia atlantica is known from the Madeira archipelago (Madeira island, Porto Santo, and Deserta Grande) and the Selvagens archipelago, where it was first discovered in 2005. Its total extent of occurrence is about 11,260 km², with an area of occupancy of 32 km².

The species grows on volcanic deposits, typically found near cliffs or on exposed slopes. It specifically grows in rock cracks and under rocks in coastal exposed areas, including on exposed coastal cliffs and eroded soil in rock hollows, at elevations between 50–250 metres. The species has low dispersal capacity, with its large spores typically remaining near the parent colonies.

On Madeira island, it is found in the eastern part, specifically the Ponta de S. Lourenço area. This region is characterized by its xerothermic (hot and dry) conditions, receiving less than 500 mm of annual rainfall, which falls primarily in winter. Under the influence of northeasterly trade winds but protected from cloud condensation by the low altitude, it occurs alongside other short-lived bryophytes (mosses and liverworts) adapted to these harsh conditions, including Acaulon muticum, Fissidens algarvicus, Exormotheca pustulosa, Riccia nigrella, and Desmatodon convolutus. The population is naturally restricted due to its specialised habitat requirements, and complete extinction has been predicted by 2070 in some climate change scenarios.

== Conservation ==
Riccia atlantica is classified as Critically Endangered (CR) by the International Union for Conservation of Nature. The total population is estimated at fewer than 250 mature individuals, with each subpopulation containing fewer than 50 plants.

Multiple threats endanger this species' survival. In Madeira and Porto Santo, tourism development and recreational activities pose the primary risks. On Deserta Island, climate change threatens the species by potentially reducing the shrub cover it depends on. In the Selvagens population, increasing soil salinity is causing a decline in suitable habitat. The species faces additional challenges from the spread of coarse grasses, which can prevent colonisation of new areas by limiting available bare surfaces. Changes in local agricultural practices may also reduce or alter suitable substrates. Wildfires pose a further threat to existing populations. Modeling studies predict severe climate-driven habitat loss for R. atlantica over coming decades. Under moderate climate change scenarios, only about 1% of currently suitable habitat is expected to remain by 2070, while under more severe scenarios the species is predicted to face complete extinction in its native range due to loss of climatically suitable areas.

Some protective measures are in place. The species is protected under regional legislation in Madeira, and its populations in Madeira, Deserta Grande, and Selvagem overlap with Natura 2000 sites. Conservation experts recommend careful protection of existing sites from tourism and agricultural impacts, along with regular monitoring of population status and habitat conditions. They also suggest considering ex situ conservation measures for this rare species.
