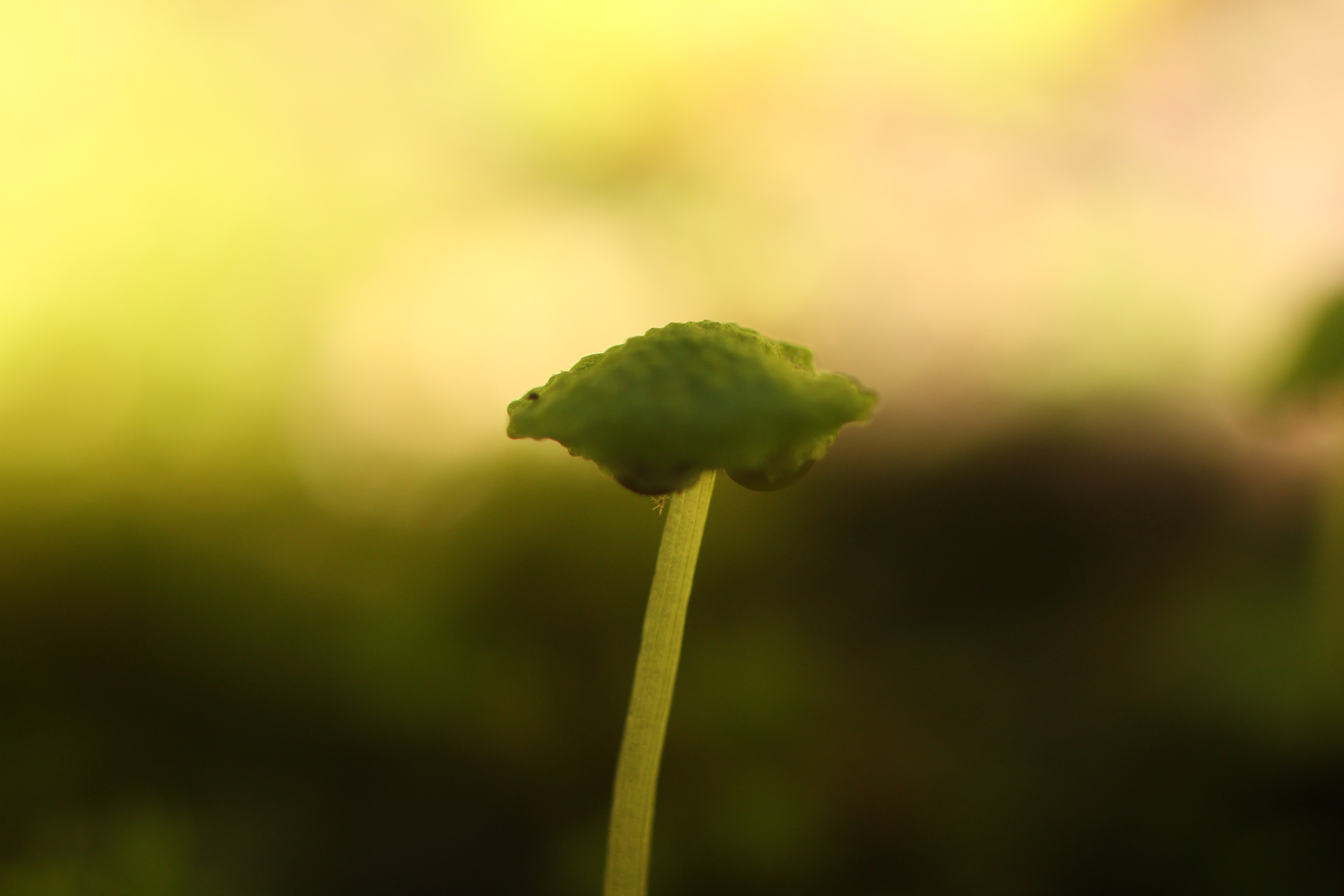
- Cryptomitrium tenerum sporangiophore

Scientific classification
- Kingdom: Plantae
- Division: Marchantiophyta
- Class: Marchantiopsida
- Order: Marchantiales
- Family: Aytoniaceae
- Genus: Cryptomitrium; Austin ex Underw.

Species
- C. himalayense Kashyap; C. oreades Perold; C. tenerum (Hook.) Austin ex Underw.

Synonyms
- Platycoaspis Lindb.; Massalongoa Steph.

= Cryptomitrium =

Genus of plants

Cryptomitrium is a genus of complex thalloid liverworts in the family Aytoniaceae. The genus name means “hidden turban” in reference to the inconspicuous sheath around the immature sporangium.

== Description ==
Sporophyte bearing receptacles are unlobed on elongate, somewhat grooved stalks, which appear pale throughout or brownish purple near the base. The receptacle is a convex-expanded disc, thinning towards the margins.

Mature sporangia are brown, nearly spherical with very short seta, three to seven per receptacle, each opening by a lid-like operculum. The sporangia mature in early spring.

== Species ==
This genus includes the following species:

- Cryptomitrium himalayense Kashyap
- Cryptomitrium oreades Perold
- Cryptomitrium tenerum (Hook.) Austin ex Underw.
