= Riccia crassifrons =

Scientific classification
- Kingdom: Plantae
- Division: Marchantiophyta
- Class: Marchantiopsida
- Order: Marchantiales
- Family: Ricciaceae
- Genus: Riccia
- Species: R. crassifrons

Binomial name
- Riccia crassifrons Spruce

Synonyms
- Riccia spruceana Steph.

Species of liverwort

Riccia crassifrons is a species of liverwort belonging to the family Ricciaceae.

A study in tropical Ecuador found that Riccia crassifrons was typically found in urban environments, suggesting that the species is tolerant to anthropogenic effects such as the presence of wastewater and heavy metal pollution.
