= Riccia sahyadrica =

Scientific classification
- Kingdom: Plantae
- Division: Marchantiophyta
- Class: Marchantiopsida
- Order: Marchantiales
- Family: Ricciaceae
- Genus: Riccia
- Species: R. sahyadrica

Binomial name
- Riccia sahyadrica Manju & Cargill, 2019

Species of liverwort

Riccia sahyadrica is a species of liverwort described from the Western Ghats of Peechi-Vazhani Wildlife Sanctuary of Kerala. Its name is derived from the Malayalam word Sahyadri for the Western Ghats. It is characterized by the photosynthetic region confined to the lower half of the thallus. In Riccia members, the photosynthetic region is on the upper half of the thallus. Only one other species, R. caroliniana from northern Australia, is known with this feature.
