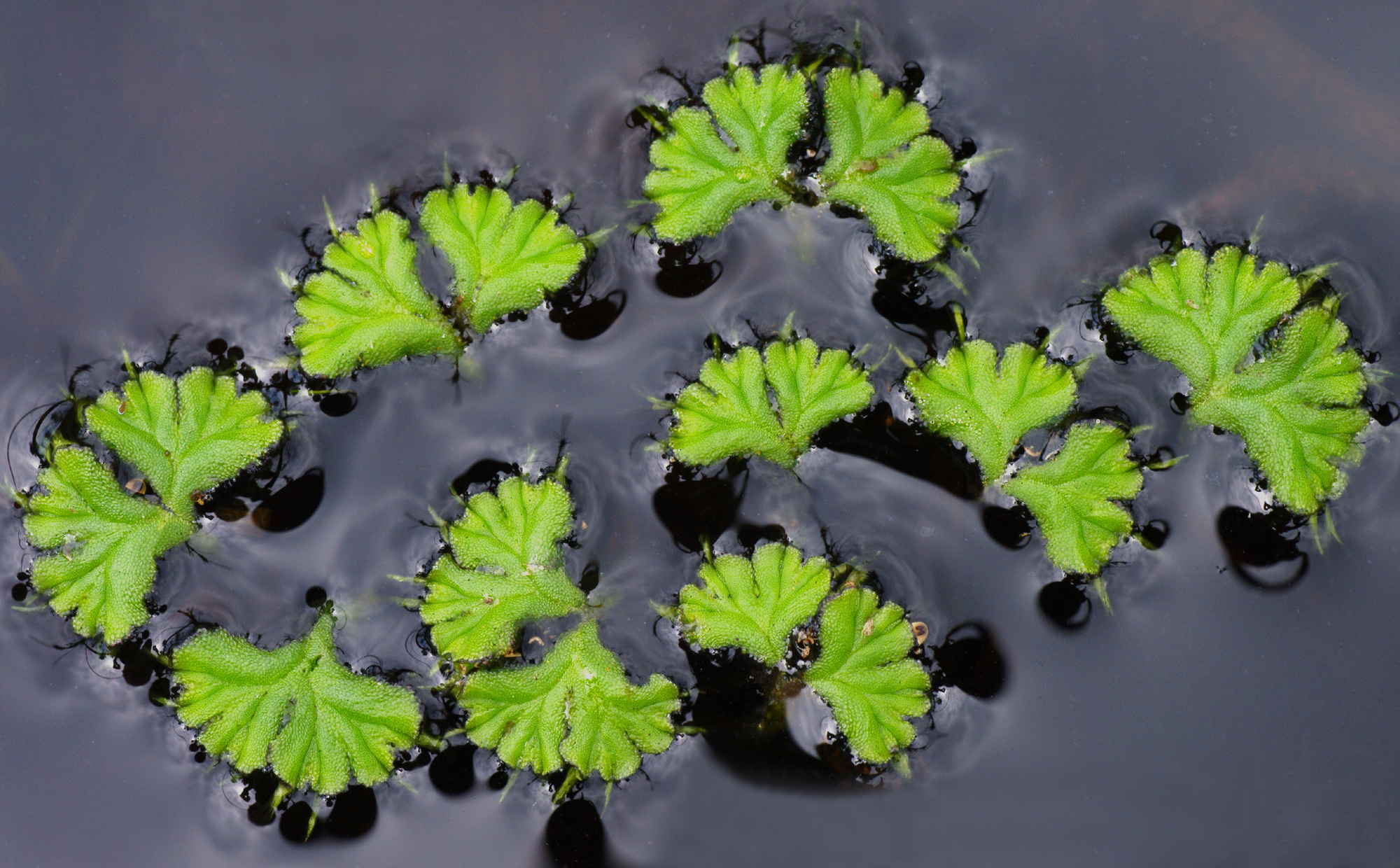

Scientific classification
- Kingdom: Plantae
- Division: Marchantiophyta
- Class: Marchantiopsida
- Order: Marchantiales
- Family: Ricciaceae
- Genus: Ricciocarpos; Corda, 1829
- Species: R. natans

Binomial name
- Ricciocarpos natans (L.) Corda

Synonyms
- Riccia capillata Schmid.; Riccia lutescens Schw.; Riccia natans L.; Riccia velutina Wilson; Ricciocarpus velutinus Stephani

= Ricciocarpos =

Genus of liverworts

Ricciocarpos natans (vernacular name: fringed heartwort) is the only species in the genus Ricciocarpos, a genus of liverworts in the family Ricciaceae. It was formerly listed in 1759 as a species of Riccia by Linnaeus, but then assigned to a new genus of its own in 1829 by August Carl Joseph Corda.

Despite having many common features with the genus Riccia, its most obvious difference from that genus is the long sword-shaped purple scales that hang from the under surface of floating plants. The genus has occasionally appeared in the literature under the spelling Ricciocarpus, but the spelling with an o is the original and accepted spelling. The specific epithet "natans" comes from the Latin word for "swimming", because plants typically float freely in ponds or quiet waters.

Plants of R. natans have two very different forms, depending on the conditions under which the plant grows. One form develops in plants that grow on land (terrestrial), and another form develops when plants grow floating in the water (aquatic). The terrestrial form develops into rosettes 25–35 millimetres across, of short and narrow branches having almost parallel sides. The more usual form is aquatic, and develops as broader, heart-shaped thallus with fewer branchings and long slender purple scales hanging from the underside. The two forms are so physically different from each other that they were originally thought to be different species.

Ricciocarpos is distributed globally, being found almost everywhere except the polar regions though it is rare in parts of the tropics. It may form extensive floating colonies in quiet waters, and grows readily in laboratory cultures. Although fertile plants are not unknown, mature plants bearing spore capsules are rarely found. It is therefore assumed that Ricciocarpos spreads primarily through vegetative reproduction as the plants break apart. It has been suggested that the aquatic forms remain sterile and that sexual reproduction is largely limited to terrestrial forms, but other sources maintain that terrestrial forms are normally sterile as well.

== Gallery ==
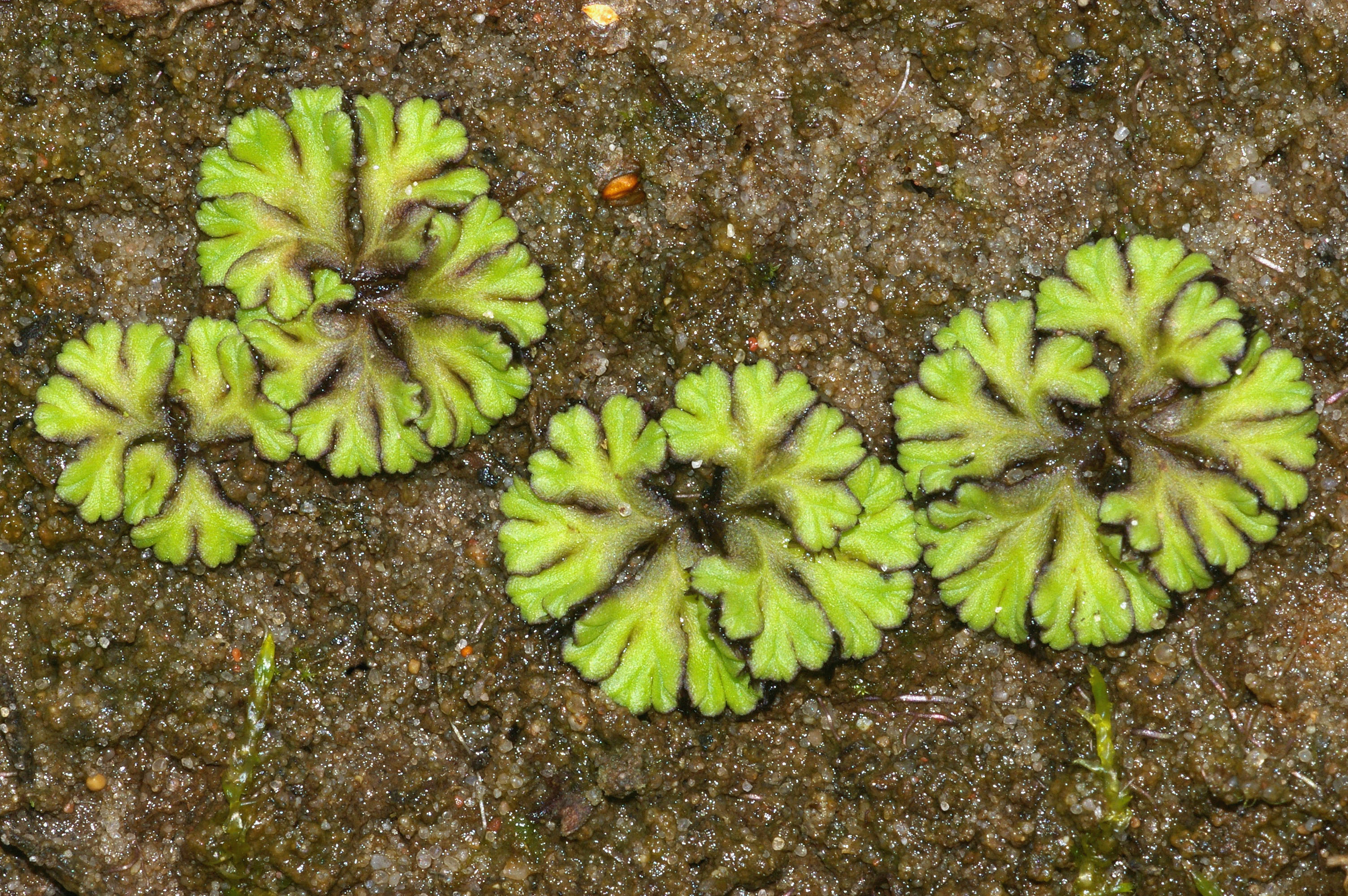
Terrestrial form of Ricciocarpos

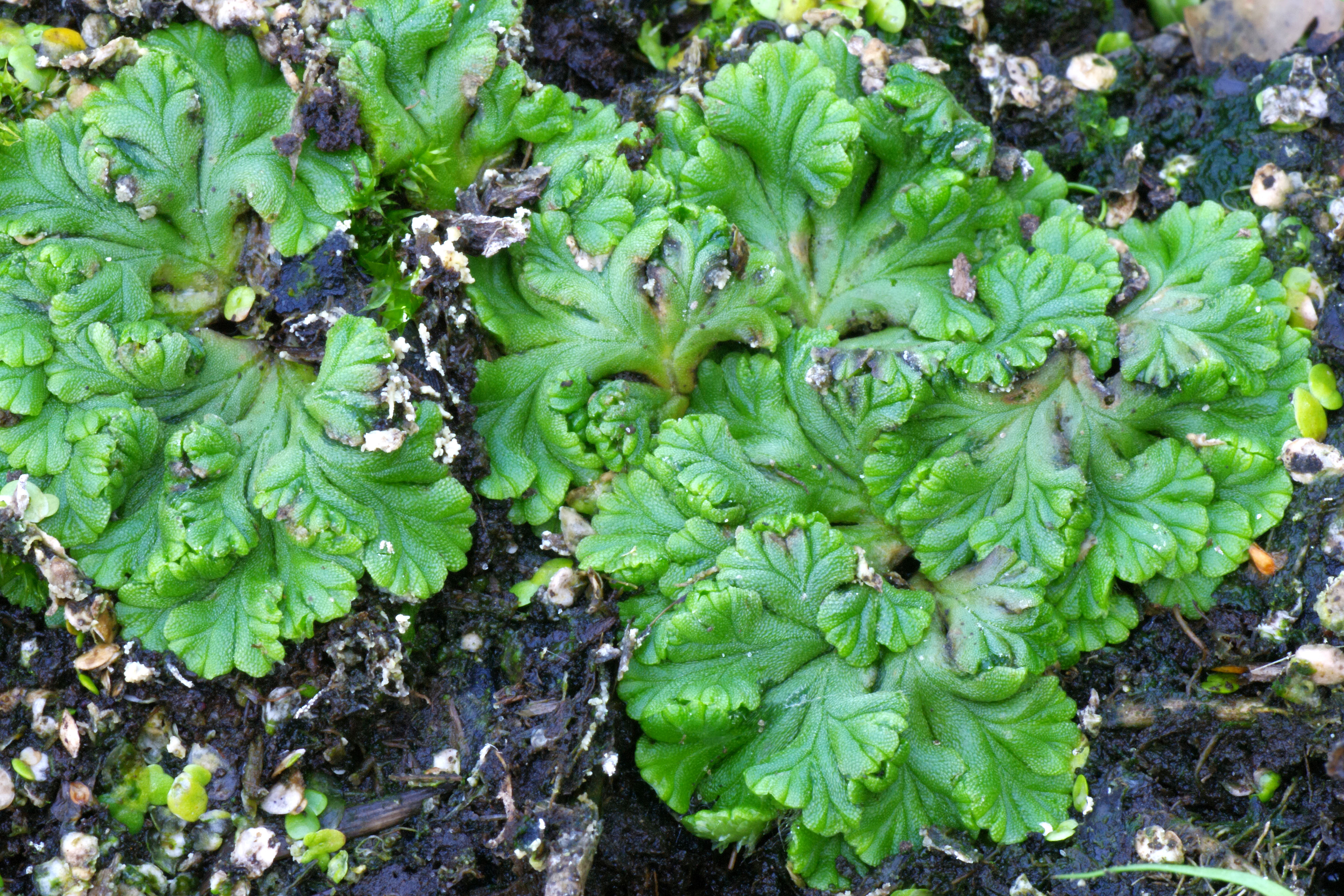
Terrestrial form of Ricciocarpos

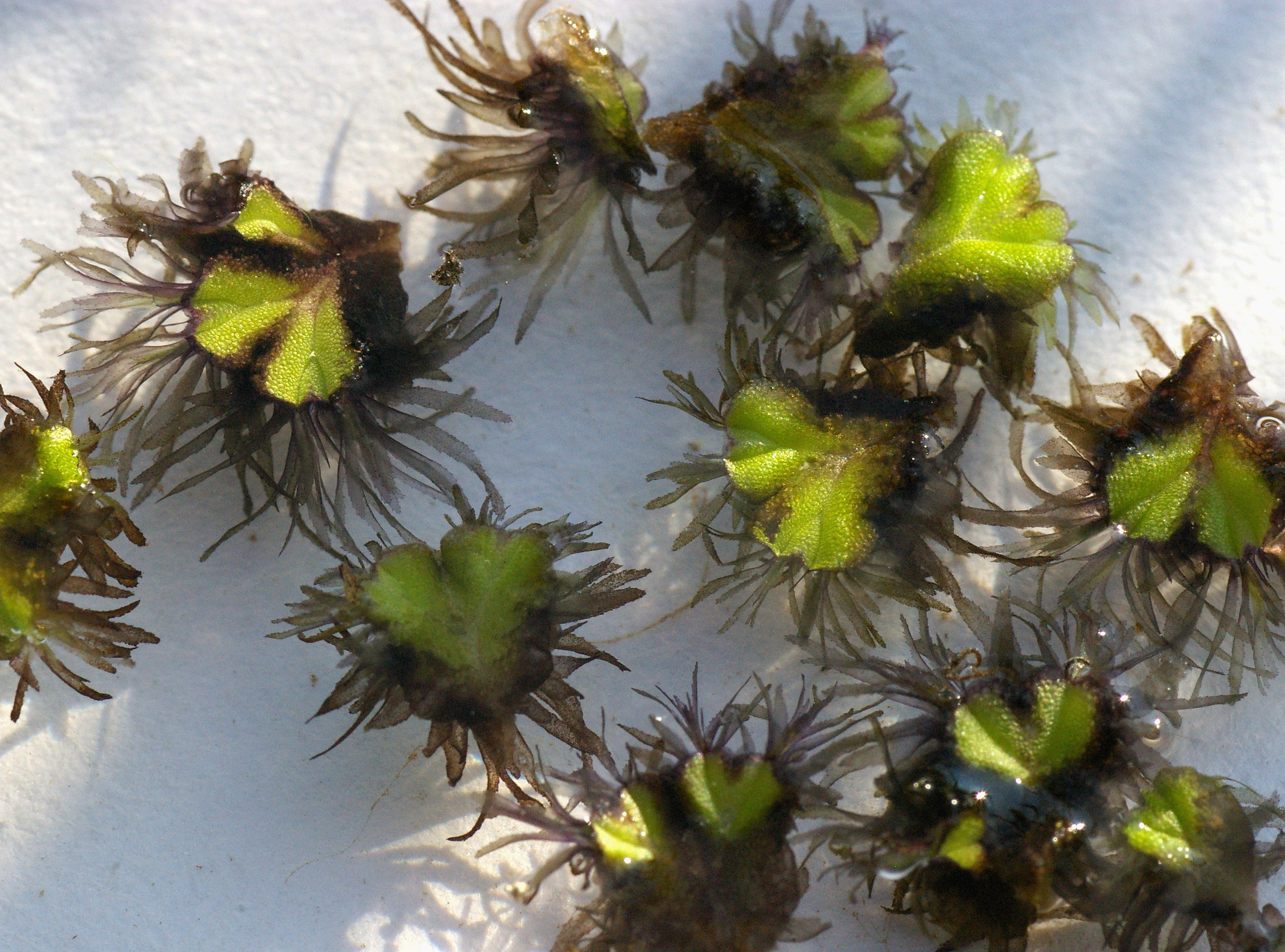
Floating form with long ventral scales visible

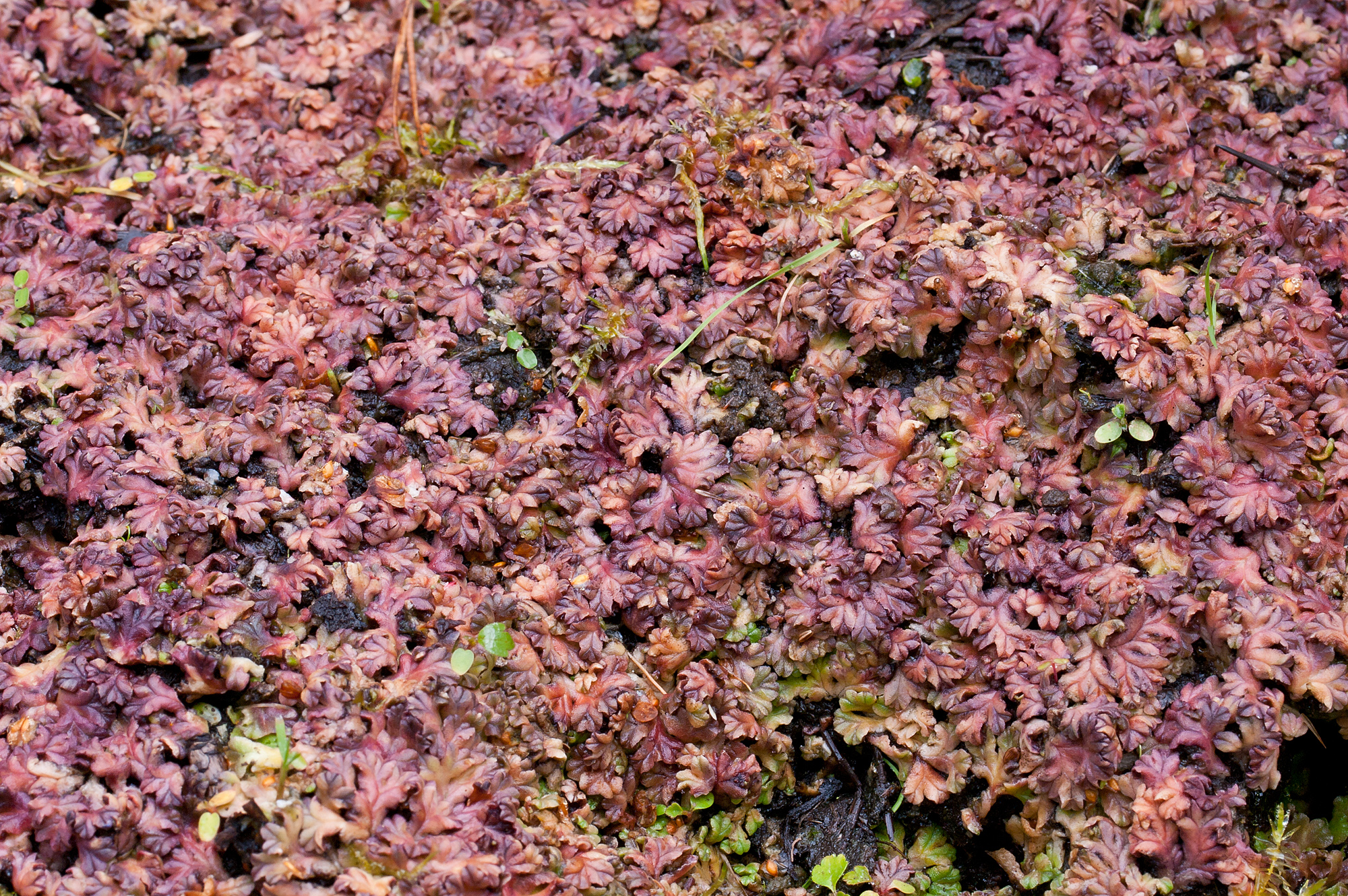
Aquatic form in autumn with red color
