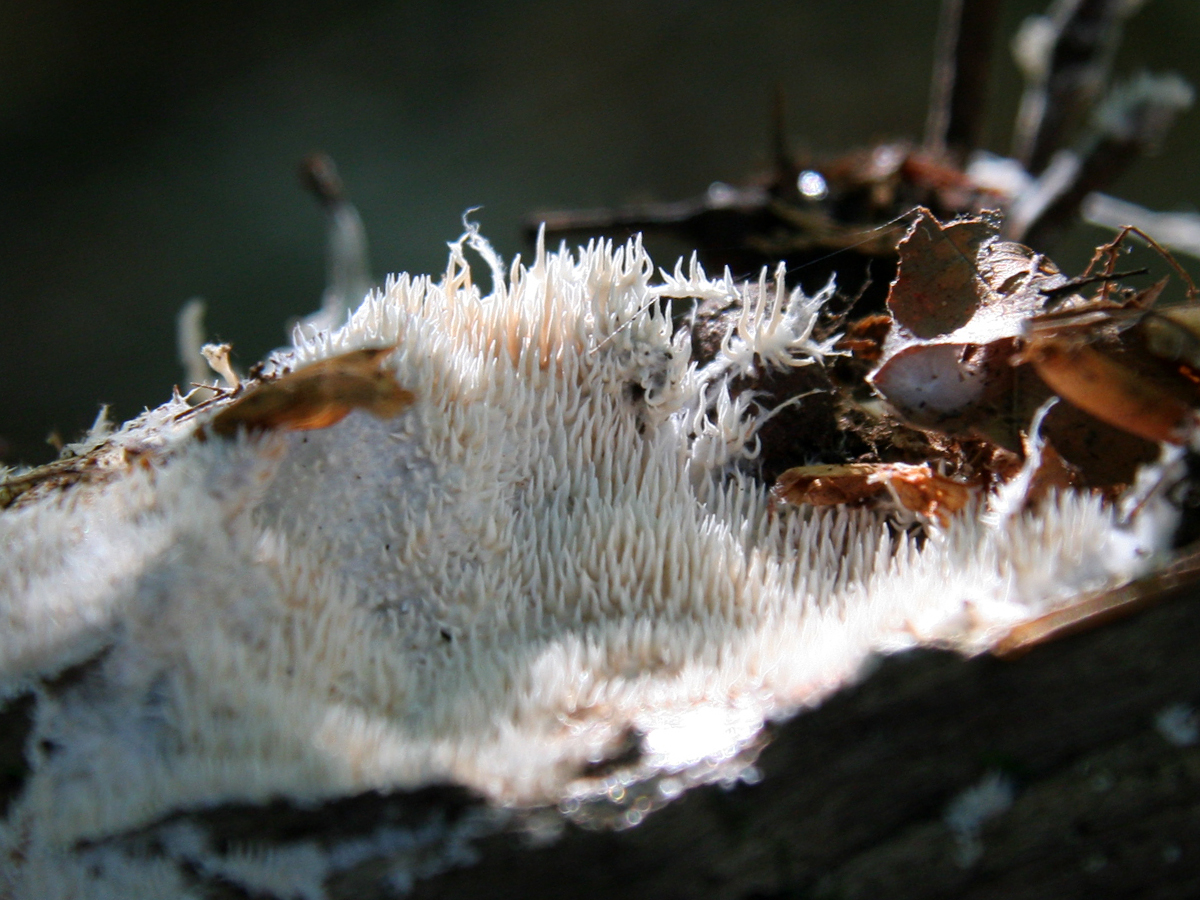
- Kavinia alboviridis

Scientific classification
- Kingdom: Fungi
- Division: Basidiomycota
- Class: Agaricomycetes
- Order: Gomphales
- Family: Lentariaceae
- Genus: Kavinia; Pilát (1938)

Type species
- Kavinia alboviridis (Pilát) Pilát (1938)

Species
- K. alboviridis K. himantia K. globispora K. salmonea K. vivantii

Synonyms
- Kavinia subgen. Hydnocristella (R.H.Petersen) Boidin & Gilles (2000)

= Kavinia =

Genus of fungi

Kavinia is a genus of fungi in the Lentariaceae family. The genus contains five species and has a largely European distribution.

The genus name of Kavinia is in honour of Karel Kavina (1890–1948) was a Czech botanist.

The genus was circumscribed by Albert Pilát in Stud. Bot. Cech. vol.1 on page 3 in 1938.
