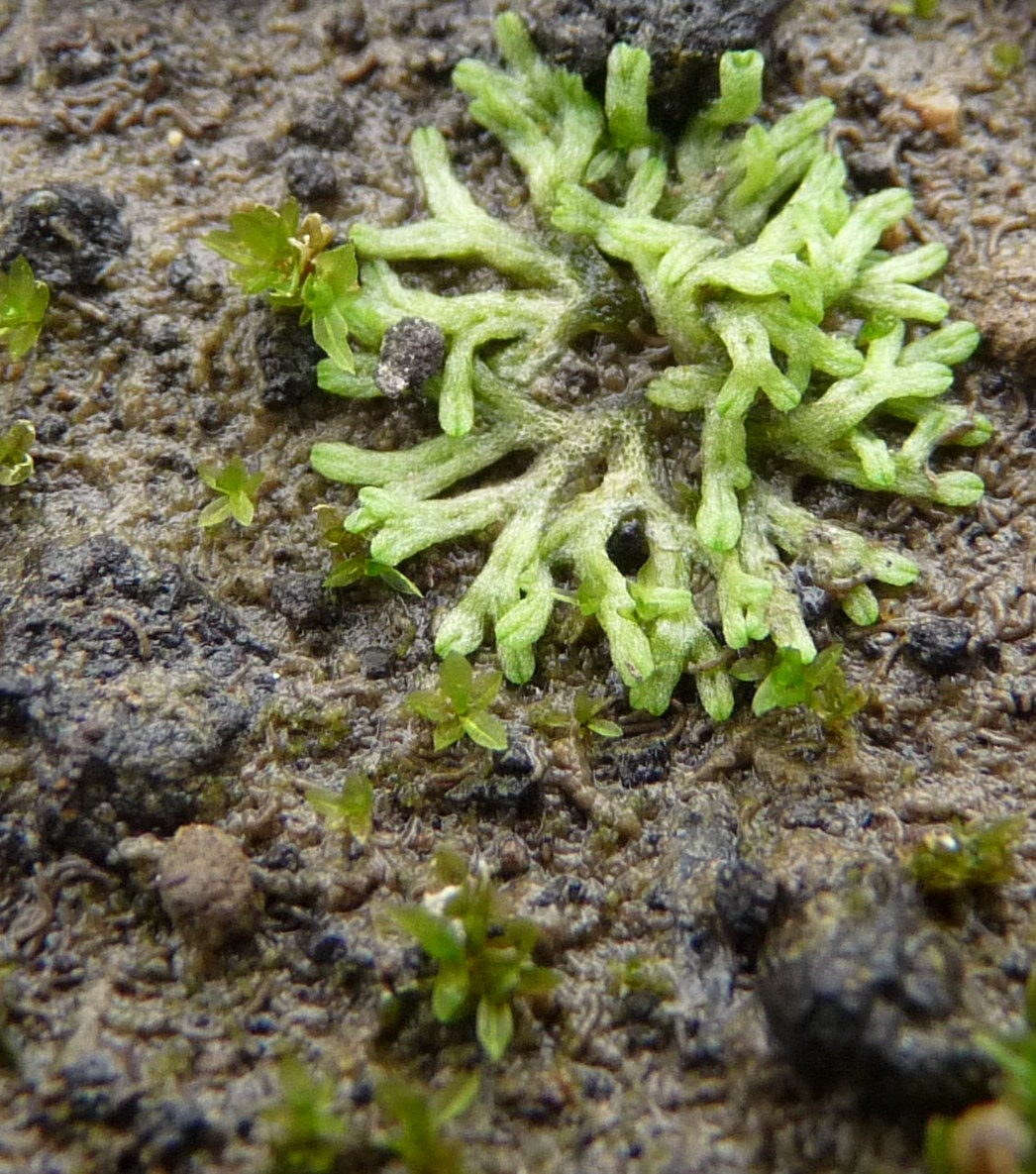
- Riccia huebeneriana

Scientific classification
- Kingdom: Plantae
- Division: Marchantiophyta
- Class: Marchantiopsida
- Order: Marchantiales
- Family: Ricciaceae
- Genus: Riccia; L.

Synonyms
- Ricciella A.Braun; Rupinia Corda; Lichenoides Lindl.; Cryptocarpus Austin; Thallocarpus Lindb.; Angiocarpus Trevis.; Euriccia Lindb. ex Lacout.; Riccinia Trab.; Fysonia Kashyap; Pteroriccia R.M.Schust.

= Riccia =

Genus of liverworts

Riccia is a genus of liverworts in the order Marchantiales.

== Description ==
These plants are small and thalloid, i.e. not differentiated into root, stem and leaf. Depending on species, the thallus may be strap-shaped and about 0.5 to 4 mm wide with dichotomous branches or may form rosettes or hemirosettes up to 3 cm in diameter, that may be gregarious and form intricate mats.

The thallus is dorsiventrally differentiated. Its upper (dorsal) surface is green and chlorophyll-bearing, with a mid-dorsal longitudinal sulcus (furrow or groove). Air pores occasionally break through the dorsal surface, giving the thallus a dimpled appearance. In exceptional members such as Riccia caroliniana of Northern Australia and Riccia sahyadrica of Western Ghats, the photosynthetic region is confined to the lower half of the thallus.

The lower (ventral) surface has a mid-ventral ridge bearing multicellular scales that originate as a single row but normally separate into two rows as the thallus widens. The scales are multicellular and hyaline (glassy) in appearance, or violet due to the pigment anthocyanin.

Rhizoids are nearly lacking in aquatic forms, but there are usually numerous unicellular rhizoids of two types on the ventral surface. One type is called smooth and the other type is the pegged or tuberculated rhizoids; these help in anchorage and absorption. The inner surface of the smooth rhizoids is smooth while that of the tuberculate rhizoid will have internal cell wall projections.

== Distribution and habitat ==
One of the more than 100 species in this genus is the "slender riccia" (Riccia fluitans), which grows on damp soil or, less commonly, floating in ponds, and is sometimes used in aquariums.

== Reproduction ==
Plants are usually monoicous, and sexual reproduction is by antheridia and archegonia. Asexual reproduction occurs by spores, by fragmentation of the rosettes, and by formation of apical tubers. Spores are large (45 to 200 μ) and formed in tetrads.

The sporophyte of Riccia is the simplest amongst bryophytes. It consists of only a capsule, missing both foot and seta, and does not perform photosynthesis.

== Species ==
The following species are recognised in the genus Riccia:

- Riccia abdita Cargill
- Riccia abuensis Bapna
- Riccia acutisulca Steph.
- Riccia alatospora O.H. Volk & Perold
- Riccia albida Sull. ex Austin
- Riccia albolimbata S.W. Arnell
- Riccia albomarginata Bisch. ex C. Krauss
- Riccia alboporosa Perold
- Riccia albopunctata Jovet-Ast
- Riccia albornata O.H. Volk & Perold
- Riccia albovestita O.H. Volk
- Riccia amboinensis Schiffn.
- Riccia ampullacea Perold
- Riccia anatolica Özenoğlu & Kırmacı
- Riccia angolensis Steph.
- Riccia arachnoidea O.F. Müll.
- Riccia aravalliensis Pandé & Udar
- Riccia argenteolimbata O.H. Volk & Perold
- Riccia arnellii Sultan Khan
- Riccia asprella Carrington & Pearson
- Riccia asservanda De Not.
- Riccia atlantica Sérgio & Perold
- Riccia atromarginata Levier
- Riccia atropurpurea Sim
- Riccia attenuata Pandé
- Riccia auriformis With.
- Riccia australis Steph.
- Riccia bahiensis Steph.
- Riccia balansae Steph.
- Riccia beyrichiana Hampe ex Lehm.
- Riccia bialbistrata Hässel
- Riccia bicarinata Lindb.
- Riccia bicolorata Perold
- Riccia bifurca Hoffm.
- Riccia billardieri Mont. & Nees
- Riccia biokoensis Perold
- Riccia blackii Na-Thalang
- Riccia boliviensis Jovet-Ast
- Riccia boumanii Dirkse, Losada-Lima & M. Stech
- Riccia brasiliensis Schiffn.
- Riccia breidleri Jur.
- Riccia breutelii Hampe ex Steph.
- Riccia brittonii M. Howe
- Riccia bullosa Link
- Riccia californica Austin
- Riccia campbelliana M. Howe
- Riccia canaliculata Hoffm.
- Riccia cancellata Taylor
- Riccia caroliniana Na-Thalang
- Riccia cartilaginosa Steph.
- Riccia cavernosa Hoffm.
- Riccia chartacea K.I. Goebel
- Riccia chiapasensis Jovet-Ast
- Riccia chinensis Herzog
- Riccia chrysocrinita Cargill
- Riccia chudoana Steph.
- Riccia ciliata Hoffm.
- Riccia ciliifera Link ex Lindenb.
- Riccia cincta Jovet-Ast
- Riccia collata Na-Thalang
- Riccia compacta Garside
- Riccia concava Bisch. ex Gottsche
- Riccia congoana Steph.
- Riccia convexa Steph.
- Riccia coracina Jovet-Ast
- Riccia coronata Sim
- Riccia corrugata Jovet-Ast
- Riccia crassa Steph.
- Riccia crassifrons Spruce
- Riccia crassivenia Jovet-Ast
- Riccia crenatodentata O.H. Volk
- Riccia crinita Taylor
- Riccia crozalsii Levier
- Riccia cruciata Kashyap
- Riccia crustata Trab.
- Riccia crystallina L.
- Riccia cubensis S.W. Arnell
- Riccia cupulifera A.V. Duthie & Garside
- Riccia curtisii (Austin) Austin
- Riccia delavayi Steph.
- Riccia deserticola Steph.
- Riccia dictyospora M. Howe
- Riccia discolor Lehm. & Lindenb.
- Riccia duplex Lorb. & Müll. Frib.
- Riccia dussiana Steph.
- Riccia eburnea Jovet-Ast
- Riccia ekmanii S.W. Arnell
- Riccia elliottii Steph.
- Riccia elongata Perold
- Riccia enyae Jovet-Ast
- Riccia epecenia Cargill
- Riccia erubescens Perold
- Riccia erythrocarpa Jovet-Ast
- Riccia esulcata Steph.
- Riccia fertilissima Steph.
- Riccia fluitans L.
- Riccia frostii Austin
- Riccia fruchartii Steph.
- Riccia furfuracea Perold
- Riccia gangetica Ahmad ex L. Söderstr., A. Hagborg & von Konrat
- Riccia garsidei Sim
- Riccia geissleriana Jovet-Ast
- Riccia gemmifera O.H. Volk
- Riccia glauca L.
- Riccia gothica Damsh. & Hallingb.
- Riccia gougetiana Durieu & Mont.
- Riccia grandis Nees
- Riccia grollei Udar
- Riccia handelii Schiffn.
- Riccia hantamensis Perold
- Riccia hasskarliana Steph.
- Riccia hawaiiensis Hürl.
- Riccia hegewaldiana Jovet-Ast
- Riccia helenae Jovet-Ast
- Riccia hirsuta O.H. Volk & Perold
- Riccia hirta (Austin) Underw.
- Riccia horrida Jovet-Ast
- Riccia hortorum Bory ex Lindenb.
- Riccia howellii M. Howe
- Riccia huebeneriana Lindenb.
- Riccia ianthina Jovet-Ast
- Riccia indica Udar & A. Gupta
- Riccia indira-gandhiensis Dabhade & A. Hasan
- Riccia inflexa Taylor
- Riccia intermedia Roum.
- Riccia iodocheila M. Howe
- Riccia jodhpurensis Bapna
- Riccia jovet-astiae E. Vianna
- Riccia junghuhniana Nees & Lindenb.
- Riccia keralensis Manju, Chandini, Sushil K. Singh & K.P. Rajesh
- Riccia kirinensis C. Gao & K.C. Chang
- Riccia lamellosa Raddi
- Riccia lanceolata Steph.
- Riccia laxisquamata (Steph.) Steph.
- Riccia leptothallus R.M. Schust.
- Riccia liaoningensis C. Gao & K.C. Chang
- Riccia ligula Steph.
- Riccia limbata Bisch.
- Riccia limicola Jovet-Ast
- Riccia lindmanii Steph.
- Riccia linearis (Schiffn.) Steph.
- Riccia luticola Na-Thalang
- Riccia macallisteri M. Howe
- Riccia macrocarpa Levier
- Riccia macrospora Steph.
- Riccia mamillata Trab. ex Steph.
- Riccia mammifera O.H. Volk & Perold
- Riccia mamrensis Perold
- Riccia mangalorica Ahmad ex Jovet-Ast
- Riccia mauryana Steph.
- Riccia melanospora Kashyap
- Riccia membranacea Gottsche & Lindenb.
- Riccia michelii Raddi
- Riccia microciliata O.H. Volk & Perold
- Riccia miyakeana Schiffn.
- Riccia moenkemeyeri Steph.
- Riccia montana Perold
- Riccia multifida (Steph.) F.M. Bailey
- Riccia muscicola Steph.
- Riccia namaquensis Perold
- Riccia natalensis Sim
- Riccia nigerica E.W. Jones
- Riccia nigrella DC.
- Riccia nigrescens Mont.
- Riccia nipponica S. Hatt.
- Riccia novohannoverana Schiffn.
- Riccia numeensis Steph.
- Riccia obchantiana Cargill
- Riccia obtusa Meijer
- Riccia oerstediana Lindenb. & Hampe
- Riccia okahandjana S.W. Arnell
- Riccia olgensis Na-Thalang
- Riccia oryzicola T. Tominaga & Furuki
- Riccia ozarkiana McGregor
- Riccia pandei Udar
- Riccia papillispora Steph.
- Riccia papillosa Moris
- Riccia papulosa (Steph.) Steph.
- Riccia paraguayensis Spruce
- Riccia paranaensis Hässel
- Riccia parvoareolata O.H. Volk & Perold
- Riccia pathankotensis Kashyap
- Riccia perennis Steph.
- Riccia perssonii Sultan Khan
- Riccia perthiana Steph. ex K.I. Goebel
- Riccia planobiconvexa Steph.
- Riccia polycarpa (Trab.) Jelenc
- Riccia porosa Taylor
- Riccia pottsiana Sim
- Riccia prominens Meijer
- Riccia pseudofluitans C. Gao & K.C. Chang
- Riccia pubescens S. Hatt.
- Riccia pullulans Jovet-Ast
- Riccia pulveracea Perold
- Riccia purpurascens Lehm.
- Riccia pyramidata Willd.
- Riccia radiata Perold
- Riccia radicosa Pearson
- Riccia rechingeri Steph.
- Riccia reticulata Sw.
- Riccia reticulatula Udar
- Riccia rhenana Lorb. ex Müll. Frib.
- Riccia ridleyi A. Gepp
- Riccia rorida Na-Thalang
- Riccia rosea O.H. Volk & Perold
- Riccia rubricollis Garside & A.V. Duthie ex S.W. Arnell
- Riccia runssorensis Steph.
- Riccia saharensis Steph. ex Jovet-Ast
- Riccia sahyadrica Manju & Cargill
- Riccia sanguineisporis Jovet-Ast
- Riccia sarieae A.E.D. Daniels & D.T.T. Daniels
- Riccia satoi S. Hatt.
- Riccia schelpei O.H. Volk & Perold
- Riccia schroederi Steph.
- Riccia schweinfurthii Steph.
- Riccia sibayenii Perold
- Riccia simii Perold
- Riccia singularis Jovet-Ast
- Riccia sinuata Huds.
- Riccia somaliensis Perold
- Riccia sommieri Levier
- Riccia sorocarpa Bisch.
- Riccia spongiosula Na-Thalang
- Riccia squamata Nees
- Riccia stricta (Lindenb.) Perold
- Riccia subbifurca Warnst. ex Croz.
- Riccia subcrinita You L. Xiang & R.L. Zhu
- Riccia subdepilata Jovet-Ast
- Riccia subplana Steph.
- Riccia subtilis (Steph.) Steph.
- Riccia sumatrana Meijer
- Riccia symoensii Vanden Berghen
- Riccia taeniaeformis Jovet-Ast
- Riccia tasmanica Steph. ex Rodway
- Riccia tenella D.L. Jacobs
- Riccia tomentosa O.H. Volk & Perold
- Riccia trabutiana Steph.
- Riccia trachyglossum Perold
- Riccia treubiana Steph.
- Riccia triangularis Steph.
- Riccia tuberculata Lam. & Poir.
- Riccia tuberosa Taylor
- Riccia udarii Kanwal
- Riccia velenovskyi Kavina
- Riccia velimalaiana A.E.D. Daniels & P. Daniel
- Riccia verrucosa Cargill
- Riccia viannae Jovet-Ast
- Riccia victoriensis Steph.
- Riccia villosa Steph.
- Riccia violacea M. Howe
- Riccia vitalii Jovet-Ast
- Riccia vitrea Perold
- Riccia volkii S.W. Arnell
- Riccia vulcanicola Eb. Fisch.
- Riccia wainionis Steph.
- Riccia warnstorfii Limpr. ex Warnst.
- Riccia weymouthiana Steph. ex Rodway
