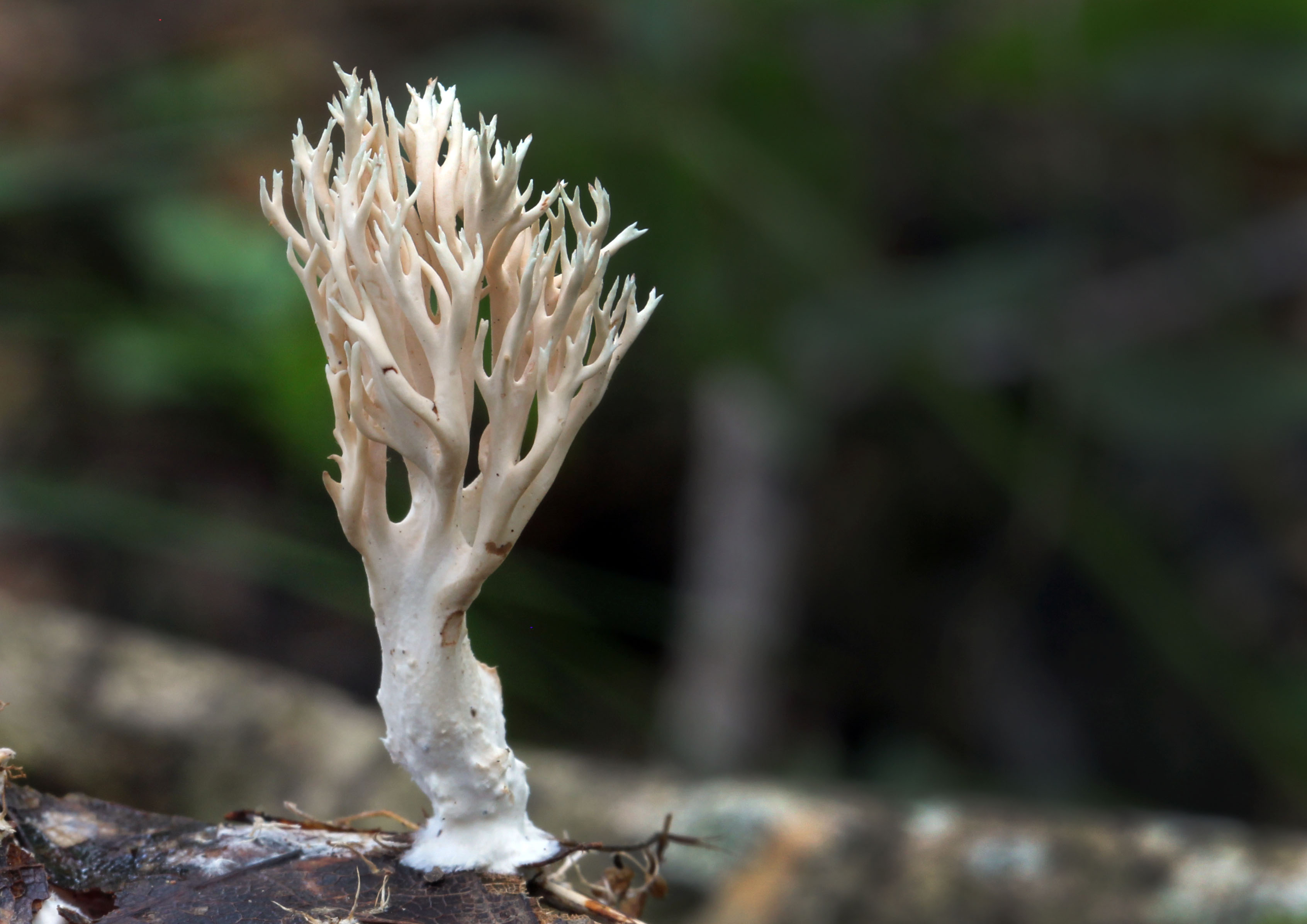
- Lentaria micheneri

Scientific classification
- Domain: Eukaryota
- Kingdom: Fungi
- Division: Basidiomycota
- Class: Agaricomycetes
- Order: Gomphales
- Family: Lentariaceae
- Genus: Lentaria; Corner (1950)

Type species
- Lentaria surculus (Berk.) Corner (1950)

Species
- 17 species

= Lentaria =

Genus of fungi

Lentaria is a genus of fungi in the family Lentariaceae. The genus has a widespread distribution and contains 17 species. It was circumscribed by British mycologist Edred John Henry Corner in 1950.

Many members are important decomposers in forest ecosystems. Samples of the genus were collected in China and studies using molecular and morphological methods. Five of the species collected were described as new species.

Species of Phaeoclavulina and Ramaria may appear similar.

== Species ==
- Lentaria afflata (Lagger) Corner (1950)
- Lentaria boletosporioides R.H.Petersen (2000)
- Lentaria byssiseda Corner (1950)
- Lentaria caribbeana R.H.Petersen (2000)
- Lentaria epichnoa (Fr.) Corner (1950)
- Lentaria glaucosiccescens R.H.Petersen (2000)
- Lentaria javanica R.H. Petersen (2000)
- Lentaria micheneri (Berk. & M.A.Curtis) Corner (1950)
- Lentaria patouillardii (Bres.) Corner (1950)
- Lentaria rionegrensis R.H. Petersen (2000)
- Lentaria surculus (Berk.) Corner (1950)
