= Sarie Magdalena Perold =

South African botanist (1928–2011)

- Born: Sarie Lombard; 19 May 1928; Johannesburg, South Africa
- Died: 11 November 2011 (aged 83); Pretoria, South Africa
- Education: University of the Witwatersrand
- Scientific career
- Fields: Botany, bryology
- Workplaces: University of Pretoria
- Author abbrev. (botany): Perold

Sarie Magdalena Perold (née Lombard; 19 May 1928 – 11 November 2011) was a South African botanist and bryologist who specialised in the study of liverworts. She was particularly known for her extensive work on African thallose liverworts, especially the genus Riccia.

== Early life and education ==
Born in Johannesburg, to a teacher father and a housewife mother who ran a nursery school, Perold graduated from Kensington high school in 1945 with four distinctions and received her B.Sc. degree from the University of the Witwatersrand in 1949, majoring in anatomy and histology. She had originally wanted to study medicine like her brother but had to settle for medical technology instead.

== Career ==
She worked as a laboratory technician in various institutions from 1950 to 1967, and co-authored four papers while at the Wits Medical School. In 1979, at the age of 51, Perold began her career in bryology at the Botanical Research Institute (later the South African National Biodiversity Institute). She initially worked as an assistant to Dr. Robert Magill on southern African mosses before beginning her research on Ricciaceae at the suggestion of Professor O.H. Volk of the University of Würzburg. Despite her late start in the field, she became one of the leading experts on African liverworts. She authored over 100 scientific papers and published the first fascicle of the liverwort volume in the Flora of southern Africa series. She described 53 new liverwort taxa, including 36 in the family Ricciaceae.

== Recognition ==
Her contributions to botany were recognised with several awards, including the R.A. Dyer Prize (1992), the Junior Captain Scott Medal (1993), and the South African Association of Botany Silver Medal (2011). Perold served on the International Association for Plant Taxonomy's permanent Nomenclature Committee for Bryophytes from 2000 to 2005.

Perold was highly regarded in the international bryological community and maintained regular correspondence with leading experts worldwide. She frequently hosted visiting bryologists and participated in international conferences, including presenting papers at several South African Association of Botanists congresses and attending two Association pour l'etude taxonomique d'Afrique tropicale congresses abroad.

Perold was known for her meticulous research and detailed taxonomic work. She collected more than 5,000 specimens across South Africa, Lesotho, Swaziland, Malawi, Réunion, and Zimbabwe. Although she officially retired in 1993 at age 65, she continued her research work on a part-time basis until 2009. She taught bryology to second-year botany students at the University of Pretoria from 1992 to 1997.

== Personal life ==
She was married to the writer and film director Jan Perold, known for Afrikaans feature films such as Die ruiter in die nag (1963). She died peacefully in her sleep in Pretoria on 11 November 2011, aged 83.
