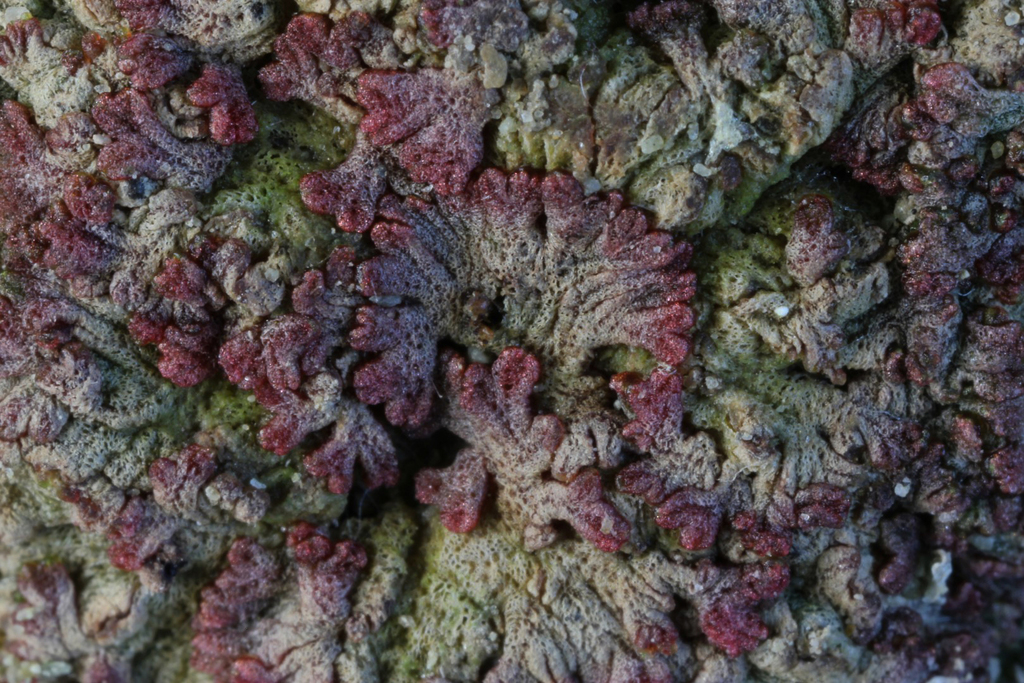

Scientific classification
- Kingdom: Plantae
- Division: Marchantiophyta
- Class: Marchantiopsida
- Order: Marchantiales
- Family: Ricciaceae
- Genus: Riccia
- Species: R. cavernosa

Binomial name
- Riccia cavernosa Hoffm.

= Riccia cavernosa =

Species of liverwort

Riccia cavernosa, also known as cavernous crystalwort, is a species of liverwort which belongs to the family Ricciaceae.

== Description ==
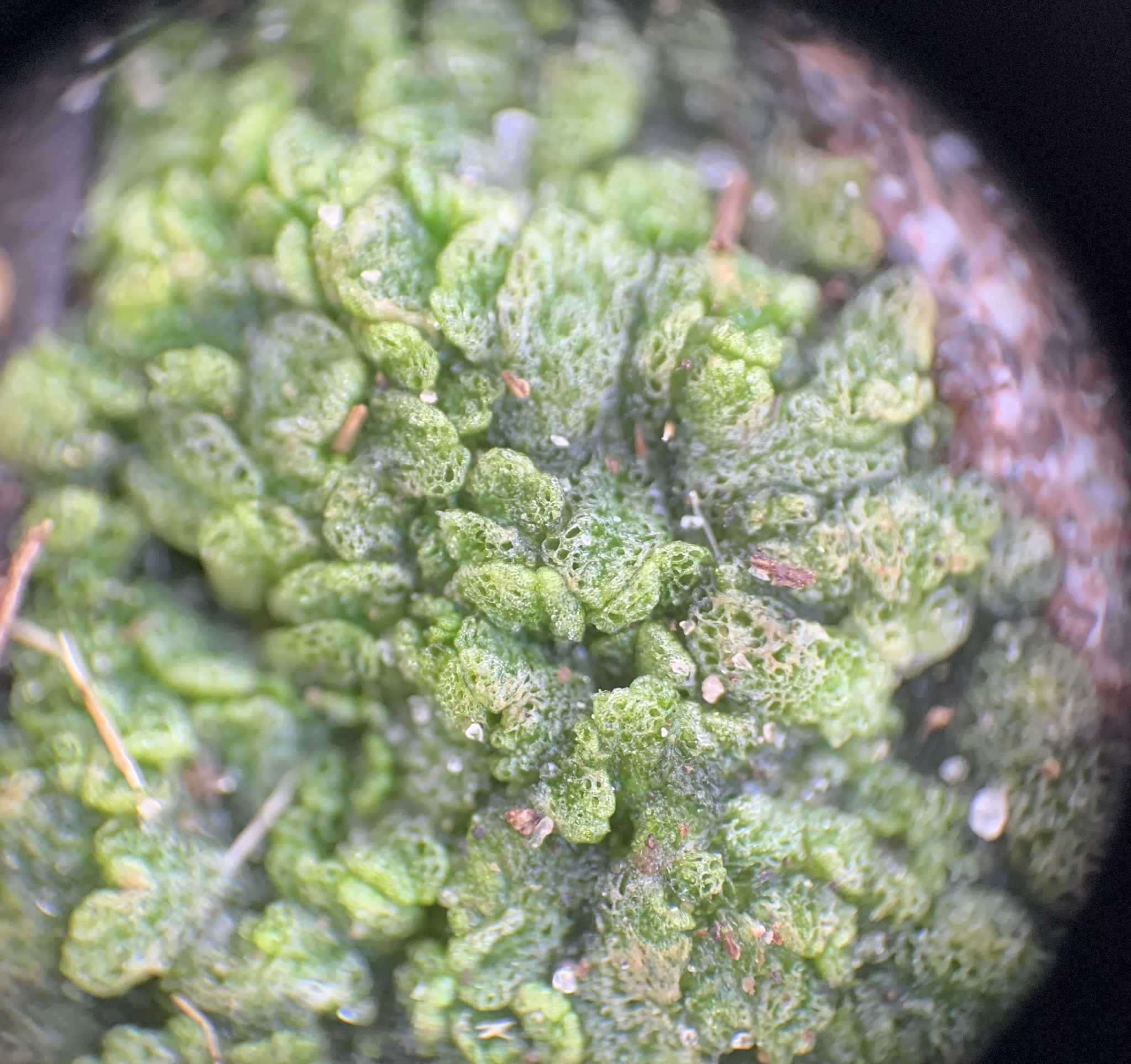
Close up of its leaf.

R. cavernosa develops in rounded rosettes that can reach up to 3 cm in diameter, consisting of numerous lobes that are either oblong or rounded, with their widest part located above the midpoint. The lobes can measure up to 2.5 mm in width and feature a tip that is more or less truncate. Typically, the plants exhibit a yellow-green colour, lacking any reddish pigmentation, and they maintain a yellowish appearance even when dried. The upper surface displays a very short, subtle groove located solely at the tip, along with perforations that extend nearly to the tips of the branches.

== Discovery ==
At present, it is estimated that there are 250 species of Riccia, with 152 being widely recognized, while the rest are classified as either 'doubtful' or 'poorly known'.

Riccia cavernosa was identified in New Zealand in February 2016, found at the edges of several artificial wetlands created to support the recovery of a threatened native wading bird (Himantopus novaezelandiae). That same year, it was also found in Vermont, growing in the cracks of cement walkways in the city of Burlington.

== Habitat ==
R. cavernosa is generally found in moist, exposed environments with neutral to base-rich mud found near reservoirs, lakes, and ponds. It can also be found in damp depressions within agricultural fields, gravel pits, and sand dunes.

== Awards ==
In 2022, R. cavernosa was awarded the Latvian moss of the year.
