= Moss of the Year in Latvia =

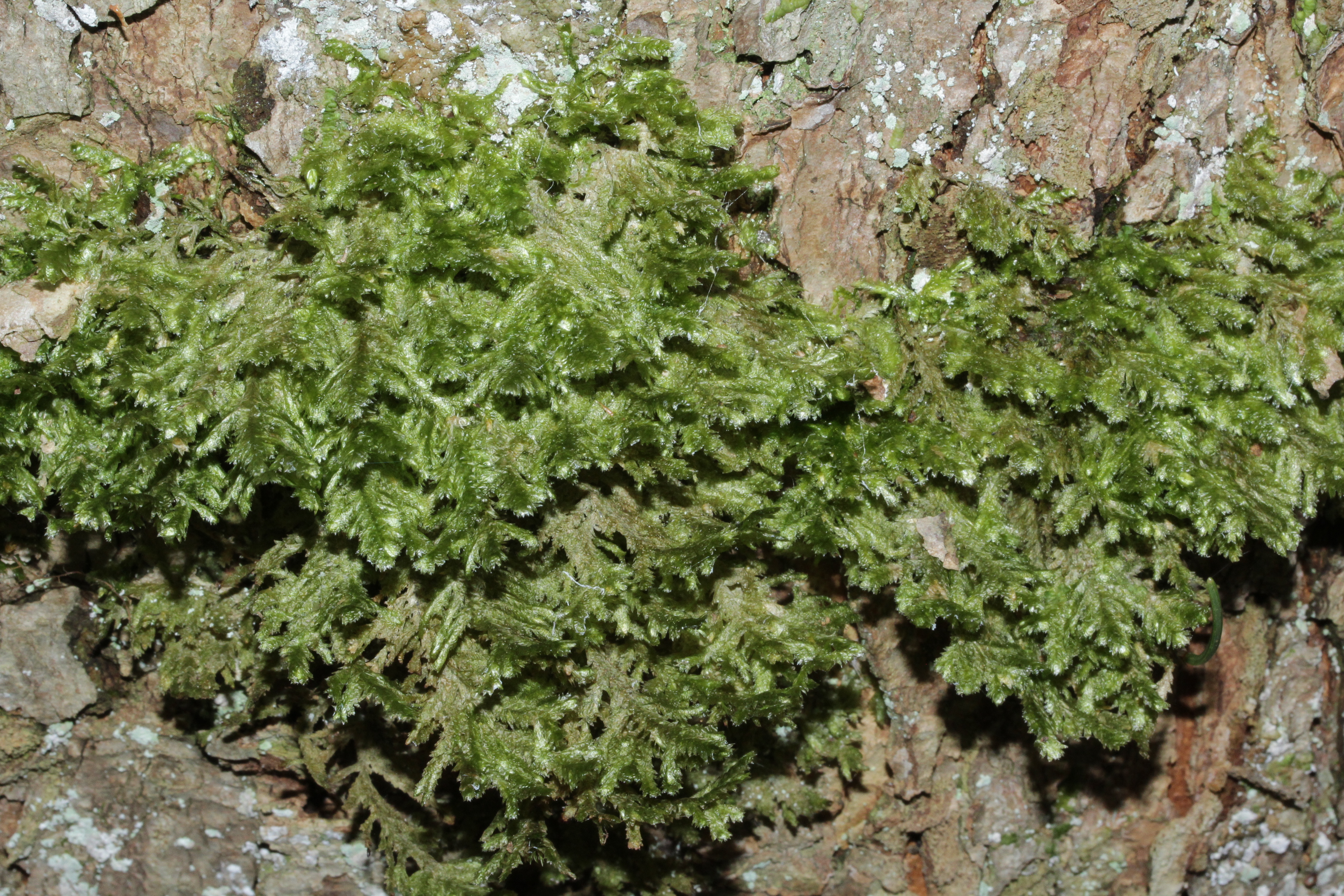
Neckera pennata

Moss of the Year in Latvia is an annual nomination of moss species of Latvian flora. The representing moss species of the year is selected by the Latvian Botanical Society's [lv] Bryology Group.

Although there are more than 500 moss species in Latvia, mosses are little-noticed by the general public. Therefore, in the first weeks of January, the announcement of the category is made in order to promote protection and overall importance of the moss as a part of the local ecosystems and landscapes. The selected moss may be used in traditional medicine, have historical importance (some species were used as bandages during wartime), or some of their structures may be rarely found, for example, sporophytes.

The category has existed since 2016.

== Selected moss species by the year ==
- 2026 – Shingle moss (Neckera pennata)
- 2025 – Angled paludella moss (Paludella squarrosa)
- 2024 – Heath star moss (Campylopus introflexus)
- 2023 – Wulf's peatmoss (Sphagnum wulfianum)
- 2022 – Riccia cavernosa (Cavernous Crystalwort)
- 2021 – Nowellia curvifolia
- 2020 – Rose moss (Rhodobryum roseum)
- 2019 – Trichocolea tomentella
- 2018 – Pincushion moss (Leucobryum glaucum)
- 2017 – Tree climacium moss (Climacium dendroides)
- 2016 – Ostrich-plume feathermoss (Ptilium crista-castrensis)
