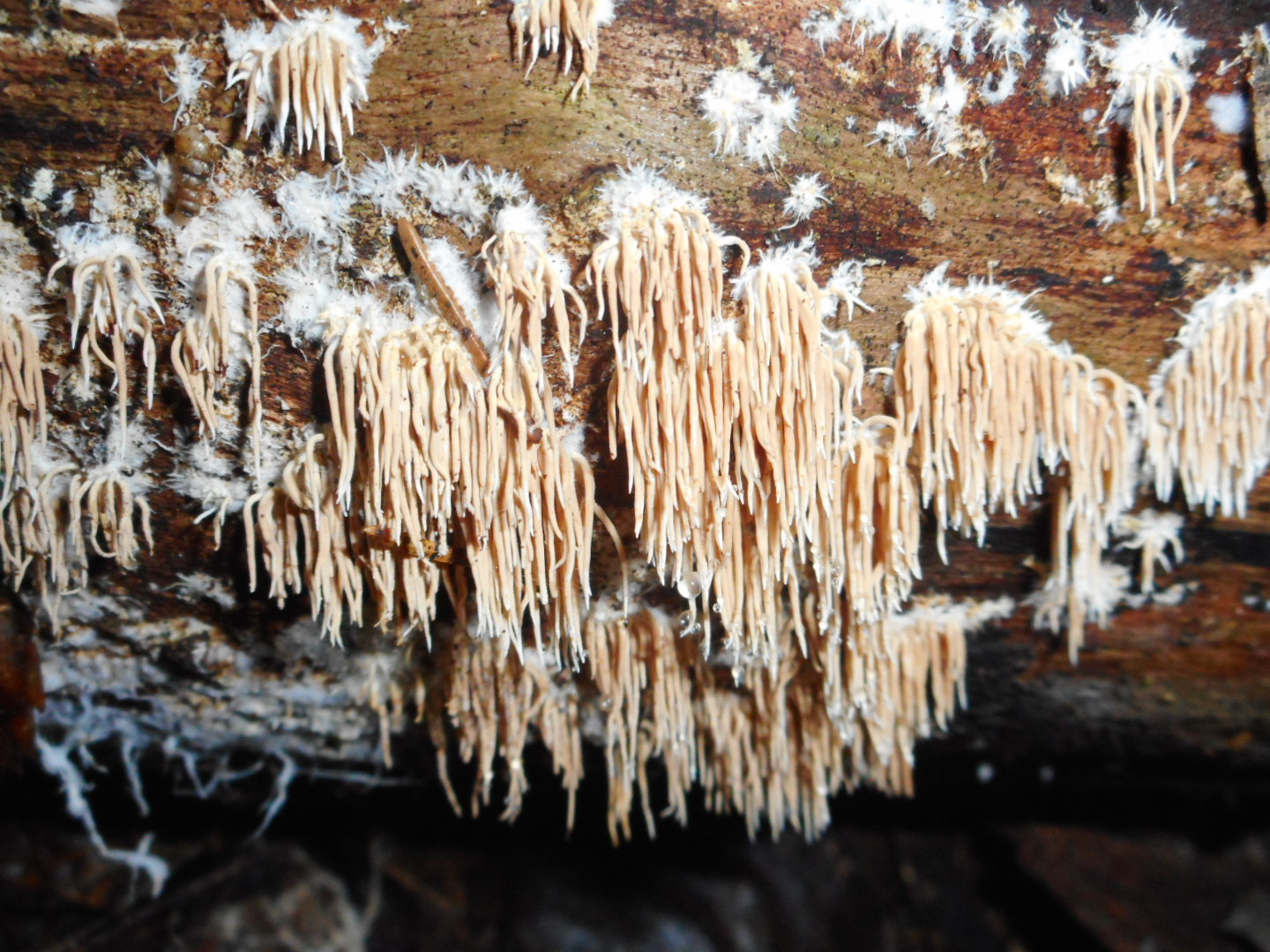
- Hydnocristella himantia

Scientific classification
- Kingdom: Fungi
- Division: Basidiomycota
- Class: Agaricomycetes
- Order: Gomphales
- Family: Lentariaceae
- Genus: Hydnocristella; R.H.Petersen (1971)

Type species
- Hydnocristella himantia (Schwein.) R.H.Petersen (1971)

= Hydnocristella =

Genus of fungi

Hydnocristella is a fungal genus in the Lentariaceae family. The genus is monotypic, containing the single species Hydnocristella himantia, found in North America. The species was originally named Hydnum himantia by Lewis David von Schweinitz in 1822, and underwent several generic transfers before being made the type species of Hydnocristella in 1971.
