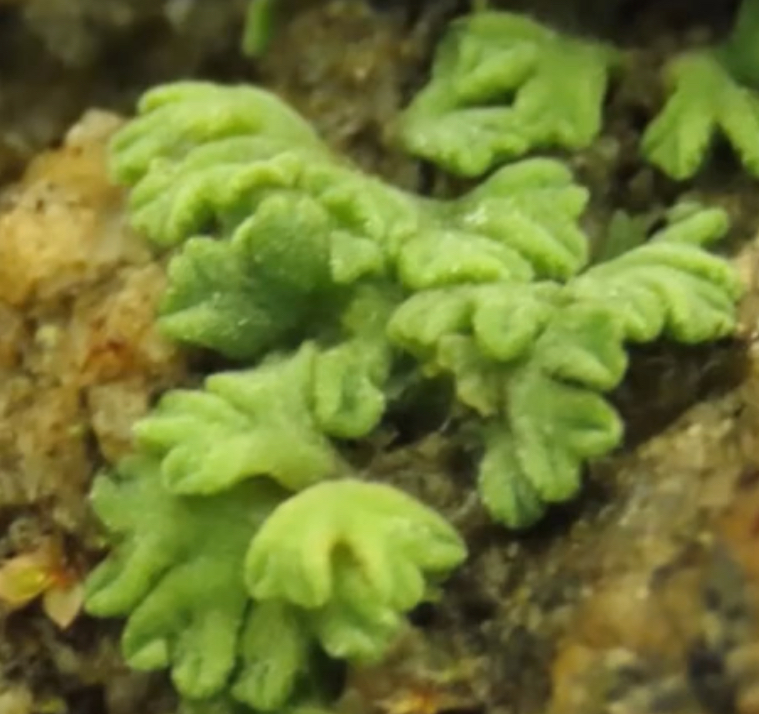

Scientific classification
- Kingdom: Plantae
- Division: Marchantiophyta
- Class: Marchantiopsida
- Order: Marchantiales
- Family: Ricciaceae
- Genus: Riccia
- Species: R. subbifurca

Binomial name
- Riccia subbifurca Warnst. ex Croz.

= Riccia subbifurca =

Species of liverwort

Riccia subbifurca, commonly known as least crystalwort, is a species of Liverwort that belongs to the family Ricciaceae. It is mainly found in the British Isles, however it has also been found in Turkey.

== Description ==
Riccia subbifurca is a small species of Riccia that forms mats or rosettes, reaching up to 15 mm in diameter. The branches of the thallus are linear or exhibit slightly curved sides, measuring approximately 1 mm in width (up to twice as broad as they are long), and are pale or yellowish-green, often with reddish tinges along the edges. The thalli feature a distinct, shallow, flat-bottomed median groove. In older sections, the upper surface is flat, while the margins are rounded in cross-section and swollen, frequently with one margin being asymmetrically more swollen than the other. These older parts often bear scattered, colorless hairs that can be seen with a hand lens. The thalli have a short lifespan. Capsules are typically formed within the older regions of the thallus.

== Identification ==
Riccia subbifurca is among the three most common species of Riccia, alongside R. sorocarpa and R. glauca. All three species exhibit intact upper thallose surfaces when they reach maturity, prior to the release of spores. This species can typically be identified, at least tentatively, by a subtle mix of distinguishing features. Unlike R. sorocarpa and R. glauca, Riccia subbifurca is predominantly green, though it may display a purplish tint, particularly in older specimens.

== Habitat ==
Riccia subbifurca thrives in diverse habitats, such as cultivated fields and gardens, sparse soil on rocky slopes, gravel paths, walkways, and the edges of reservoirs. It frequently coexists with R. sorocarpa, although it tends to be less noticeable.
