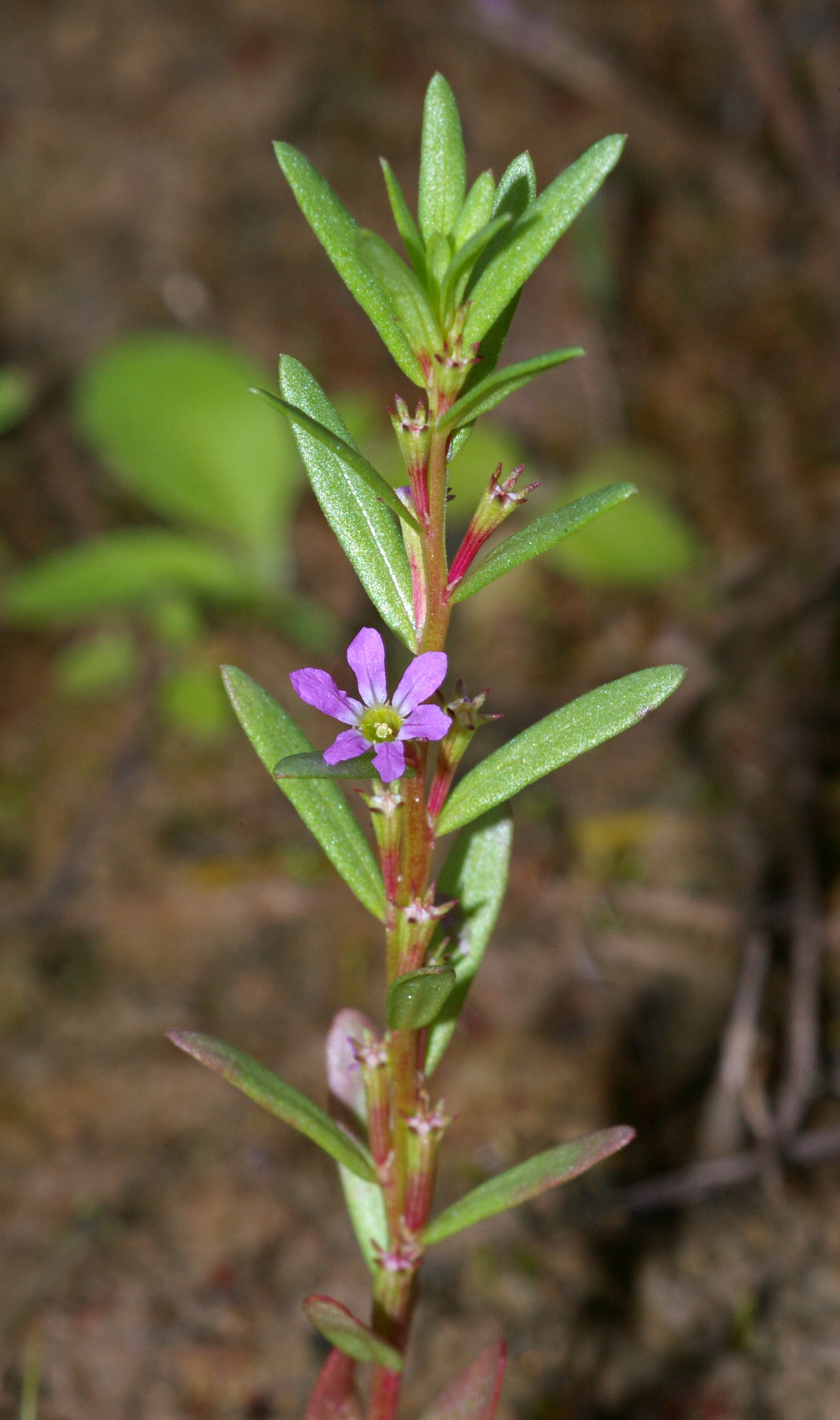

Conservation status
- Least Concern (IUCN 3.1)

Scientific classification
- Kingdom: Plantae
- Clade: Embryophytes
- Clade: Tracheophytes
- Clade: Spermatophytes
- Clade: Angiosperms
- Clade: Eudicots
- Clade: Rosids
- Order: Myrtales
- Family: Lythraceae
- Genus: Lythrum
- Species: L. hyssopifolia

Binomial name
- Lythrum hyssopifolia L.

= Lythrum hyssopifolia =

Species of flowering plant

Lythrum hyssopifolia (orth. var. L. hyssopifolium) is a species of flowering plant in the loosestrife family known by the common names hyssop loosestrife and grass-poly. It is native to Europe but it is known elsewhere, including parts of Australia and eastern and western North America, as an introduced species and sometimes a weed. It is rare in the United Kingdom, with occasional isolated populations. It often grows in moist habitats, such as marshes and wet agricultural fields, rice paddies, for example.

It is a mostly upright, branching annual or biennial herb growing 10 to 60 centimeters (3.9 to 23.6 in) tall. The oval leaves are arranged oppositely lower on the plant, and often alternately toward the top. They are up to 3 centimeters (1.2 in) in length. The inflorescence is a terminal spike of flowers with pinkish petals up to half a centimeter (¼") long. The fruit is an oval capsule containing many minute seeds.

The Latin word hyssopifolia (which occurs in several plant names) means "hyssop-leafed".
