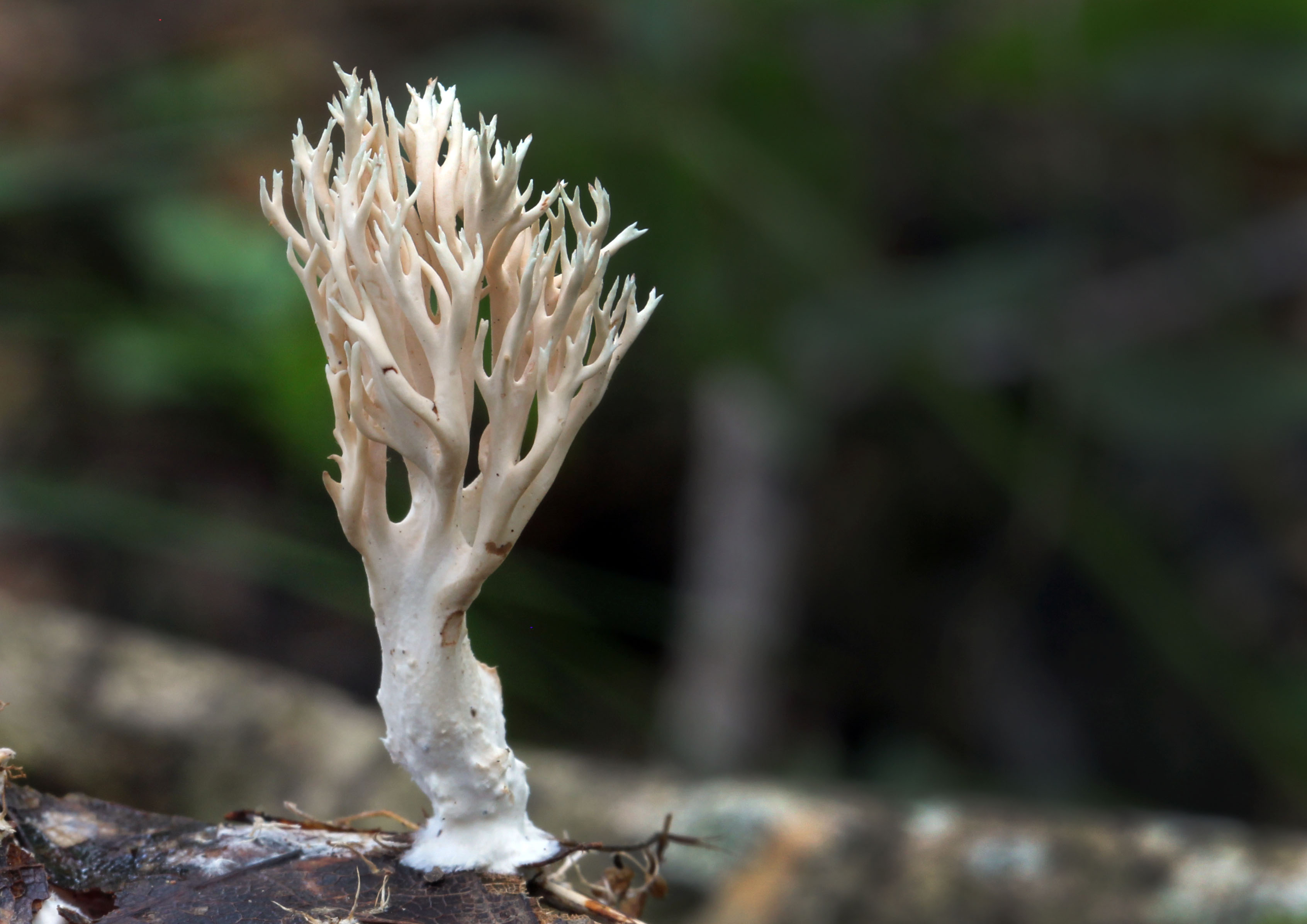
- Lentaria micheneri

Scientific classification
- Kingdom: Fungi
- Division: Basidiomycota
- Class: Agaricomycetes
- Order: Gomphales
- Family: Lentariaceae; Jülich (1981)

Type genus
- Lentaria Corner (1950)

Genera
- Hydnocristella; Kavinia; Lentaria

= Lentariaceae =

Family of fungi

The Lentariaceae are a family of fungi belonging in what is classically known as the Gomphales order, or cladistically as the gomphoid-phalloid clade. First described by Swiss mycologist Walter Jülich in 1981, the family has 3 genera and 23 species.
