= Gottlieb Wilhelm Bischoff =

German botanist and educator (1797–1854)

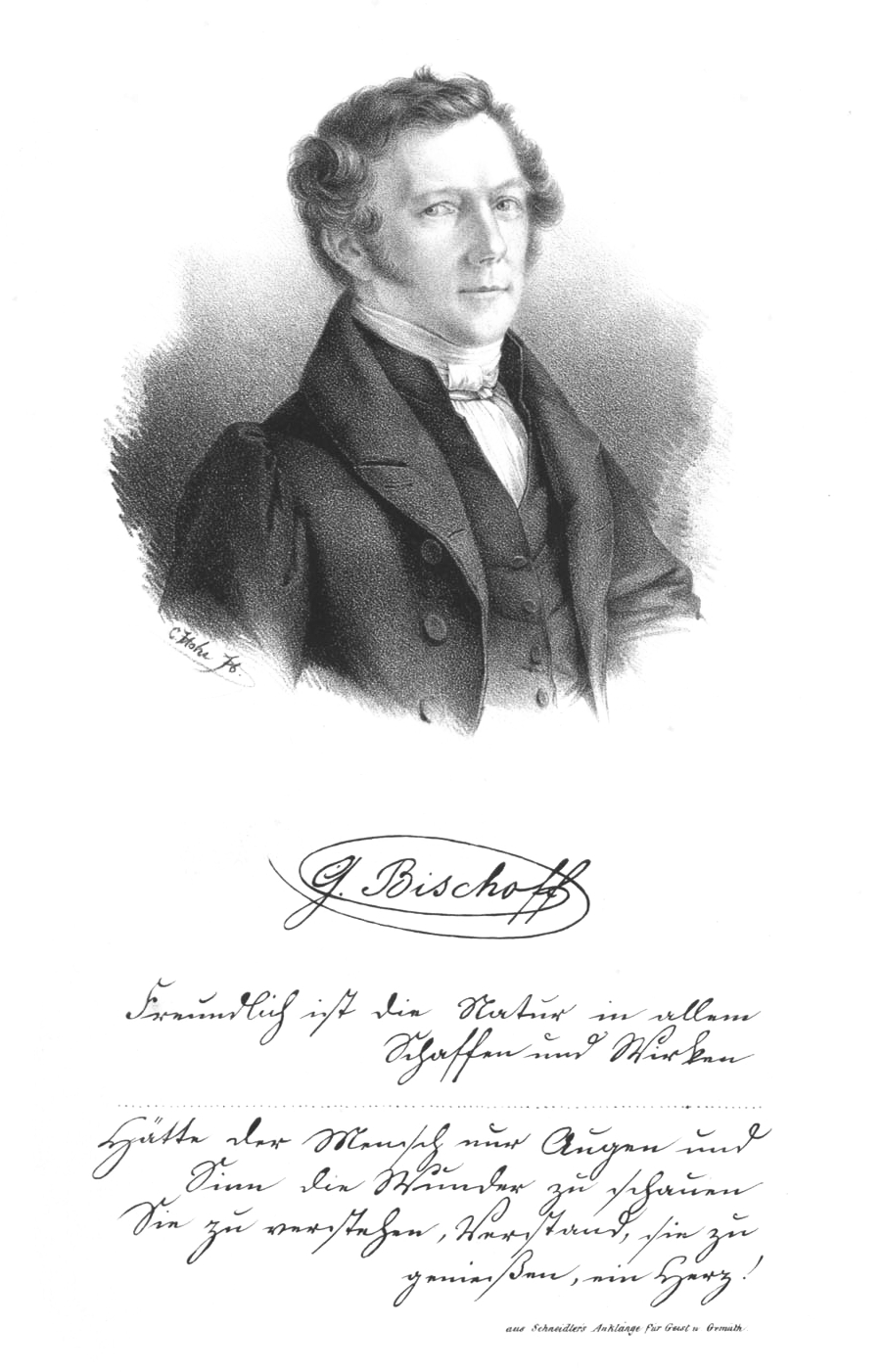
Engraving

Gottlieb Wilhelm Bischoff (21 May 1797 – 11 September 1854) was a German botanist and university professor. He was among the first to examine the reproduction of mosses and liverworts and is credited with coining the terms archegonia and antheridia.

Bischoff was born in Dürkheim and studied botany under Wilhelm Daniel Koch, the author a major flora of Germany, in Kaiserslautern. He then went to the Academy of Fine Arts, Munich in 1819 and then studied botany in Erlangen from 1821. He began to teach in Heidelberg from 1824 and received a habilitation in 1825. He became a professor of botany in 1833 and directed the botanical garden in Heidelberg from 1839. He specialized in the liverworts and mosses coining the terms archegonium and antheridium. Bischoff issued the exsiccata Herbarium normale plantarum officinalium et mercatorium.

The genus Bischofia was named after Gottlieb Wilhelm Bischoff by Karl Blume.

The standard author abbreviation Bisch. is used to indicate this person as the author when citing a botanical name.
