= Rosette (botany) =

Botany term for a circular arrangement of leaves

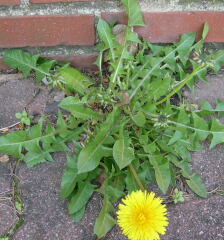
A rosette of leaves at the base of a dandelion

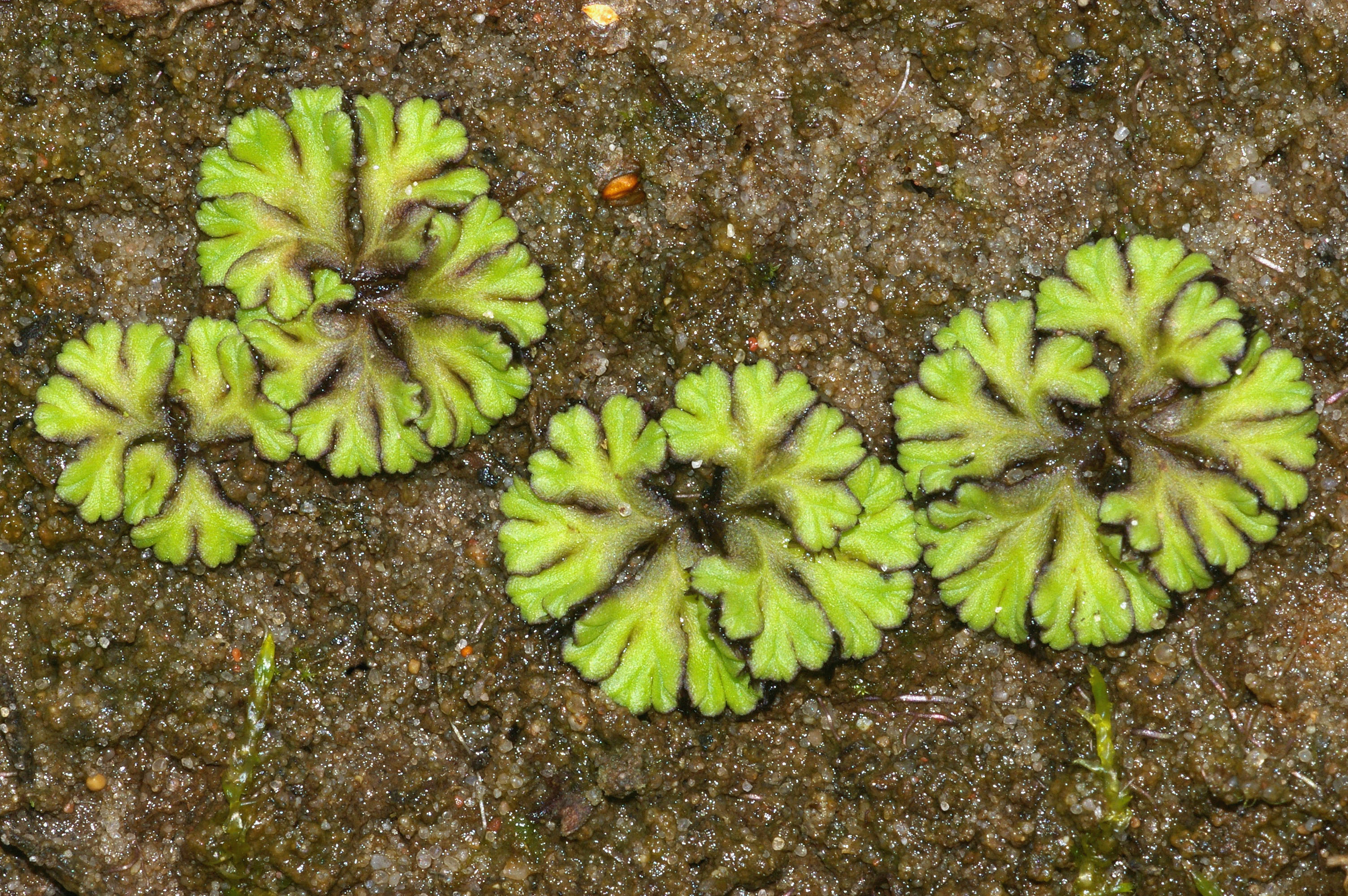
Rosette growth form of the liverwort Ricciocarpos natans.

In botany, a rosette is a circular arrangement of leaves or of structures resembling leaves.

In flowering plants, rosettes usually sit near the soil, but they can also be at the top of an otherwise leafless branch or trunk. Their structure is an example of a modified stem in which the internode gaps between the leaves do not expand, so that all the leaves remain clustered tightly together and at a similar height. Some insects induce the development of galls that are leafy rosettes.

In bryophytes and algae, a rosette results from the repeated branching of the thallus as the plant grows, resulting in a circular outline.

== Taxonomies ==
Many plant families have varieties with rosette morphology; they are particularly common in Asteraceae (such as dandelions), Brassicaceae (such as cabbage), and Bromeliaceae. The fern Blechnum fluviatile or New Zealand Water Fern (kiwikiwi) is a rosette plant.

== Function in flowering plants ==
Often, rosettes form in perennial plants whose upper foliage dies back with the remaining vegetation protecting the plant. Another form occurs when internodes along a stem are shortened, bringing the leaves closer together, as in lettuce, dandelion and some succulents. (When plants such as lettuce grow too quickly, the stem lengthens instead, a condition known as bolting.) In yet other forms, the rosette persists at the base of the plant (such as the dandelion), and there is a taproot.

=== Protection ===
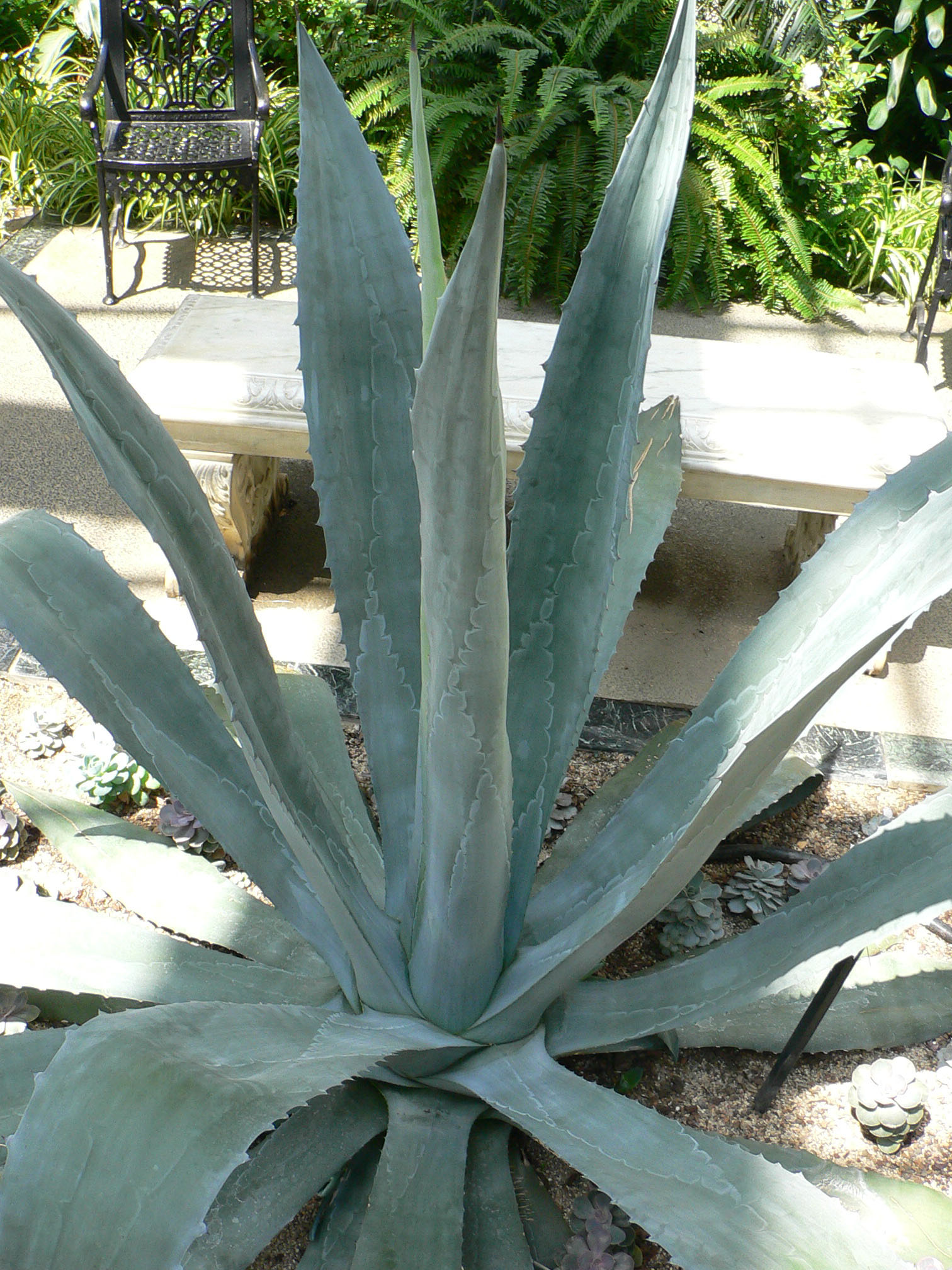
Rosette of leaves of Agave americana

Part of the protective function of a rosette like the dandelion is that it is hard to pull from the ground; the leaves come away easily while the taproot is left intact.

Another kind of protection is provided by the caulescent rosette, which is part of the growth form of the giant herb genus Espeletia in South America, which has a well-developed stem above the ground. In tropical alpine environments, a wide variety of plants in different plant families and different parts of the world have evolved this growth form characterized by evergreen rosettes growing above marcescent leaves. Examples where this arrangement has been confirmed to improve survival, help water balance, or protect the plant from cold injury are Espeletia schultzii and Espeletia timotensis, both from the Andes.

== Form ==
The rosette form is the structure, the relationship of the parts, and the variations within it, as shown in the following study from a herbarium:

- Dryas octopetala (white dryas, Rosaceae) has a leaf rosette of leaf blades with a short petiole, slim, egg-shaped leaves with cordate bases with clearly and regularly toothed margins, and single flowers on usually long peduncles or stalks, two to four centimetres across. The flowers have seven to nine, often even more, white egg-shaped petals. The sepals are lanceolate.
- Silene nutans (Nottingham catchfly, Caryophyllaceae) shows ensiform-lanceolate leaves. The slightly rosette-like ground leaves are bigger and of different shape than the sparse, opposite leaves on the stem. This is explained in that side shoots with greatly prolonged internodes may spring from rosettes. They have one or more flowers at their tip, like the primrose. Especially in biennial plants, the main shoot can grow with prolonged internodes and even branches. It is not unusual that the leaves of the rosette and those of the shoot differ in shape.

As form, "rosette" is used to describe plants that perpetually grow as a rosette and the immature stage of plants such as some ferns.

== See also ==
- Asteraceae
- Bromeliad
  - Billbergia
- Fern
  - Bird's nest fern
  - Ostrich fern
  - Wild bird's-nest fern
