= Karel Kavina =

Czech botanist, educator and university educator (1890–1948)

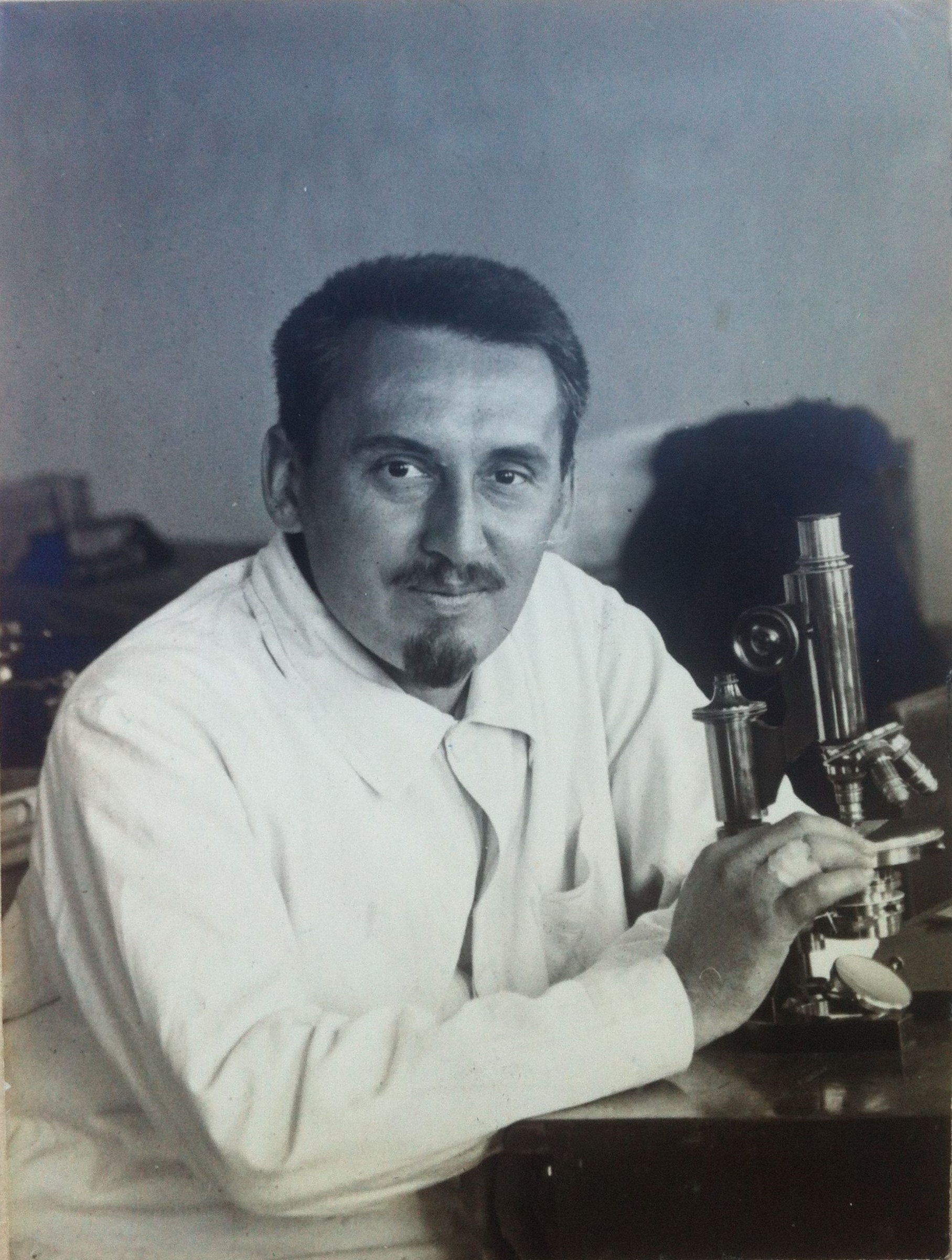
Karel Kavina

Karel Kavina (4 September 1890 – 21 January 1948) was a Czech botanist.

== Life and work ==
Kavina was born on 4 September 1890 in Prague. He was professor of botany at the Technical University in Prague. He played a significant role in popularising botany and was also dedicated to nature conservation. He helped establish the Krkonoše National Park.

Kavina worked on systematics, plant morphology and anatomy, and bryology. He published several atlases and monographs and was editor-in-chief of two botanical journals. With Alfred C. Hilitzer he issued the exsiccata Cryptogamae Čechoslovenicae exsiccatae, editae ab instituto botanico Polytechnici Pragense, curantibus Prof. Dr. K. Kavina et Doc. Dr. A. Hilitzer (1933-1937).

In 1938, botanist Albert Pilát published Kavinia, which is a genus of fungi in the Lentariaceae family. The genus contains five species, and has a largely European distribution. It was named in Kavina's honour.

Kavina died on 21 January 1948 in Prague.
