= Coe Finch Austin =

- Coe Finch Austin
- Born: June 20, 1831; Finchville, Orange County, New York
- Died: March 18, 1880 (aged 48); Closter, New Jersey
- Citizenship: American
- Scientific career
- Fields: bryology, botany
- Workplaces: Columbia University
- Author abbrev. (botany): Austin

Coe Finch Austin (June 20, 1831 – March 18, 1880) was an educator, botanist and founding member of the Torrey Botanical Club. He was an expert on the mosses and liverworts of North America.

== Life ==
Austin was born in Finchville, Orange County, New York, the second of ten children to farmers James C. Austin and Elizabeth (Cortwright) Austin. He attended public school when he was young but also worked on his family farm. His interest in plant life also came at an early age and he was a constant companion to his mother in her flower garden.

In the early 1850s, Austin attended Rankin Classical School in Sussex County, New Jersey, where he dedicated himself to the study of botany thanks to the influence of Mrs. Rankin, who was a botanist of note at that time. During this period he developed a particular passion for mosses and lichens. Austin would go on to develop internationally renowned skills for naming and identifying bryophytes.

As a young man, Austin worked as a school teacher in Tappan, New York, where he met and married Hannah Campbell, the daughter of a New Jersey farmer. But it was through his acquaintance with John Torrey that he secured a position as curator of the Columbia College Herbarium from 1859 thru 1863. In 1870, he published his most well-known work, Musci appalachiani, which dealt with the mosses of the Eastern United States. In the same year he edited and distributed the exsiccata Musci Appalachiani, Tickets of specimens of mosses collected mostly in the eastern part of North America by C. F. Austin, followed by two other exsiccatae.

He died in Closter, New Jersey, where he had lived most of his adult life. He was survived by his wife, one son, five daughters, and his parents.

== Legacy ==
The genus Austinia was named in his honor.
