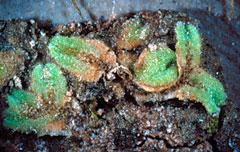
- Riccia gougetiana

Scientific classification
- Kingdom: Plantae
- Division: Marchantiophyta
- Class: Marchantiopsida
- Order: Marchantiales
- Family: Ricciaceae; Rchb., 1828

Genera
- Riccia; Ricciocarpos; Ricciaesporites †; Ricciopsis †; Riccites †

= Ricciaceae =

Family of liverworts

Ricciaceae are a family of liverworts in order Marchantiales, with two extant genera.

- Riccia
- Ricciocarpos
