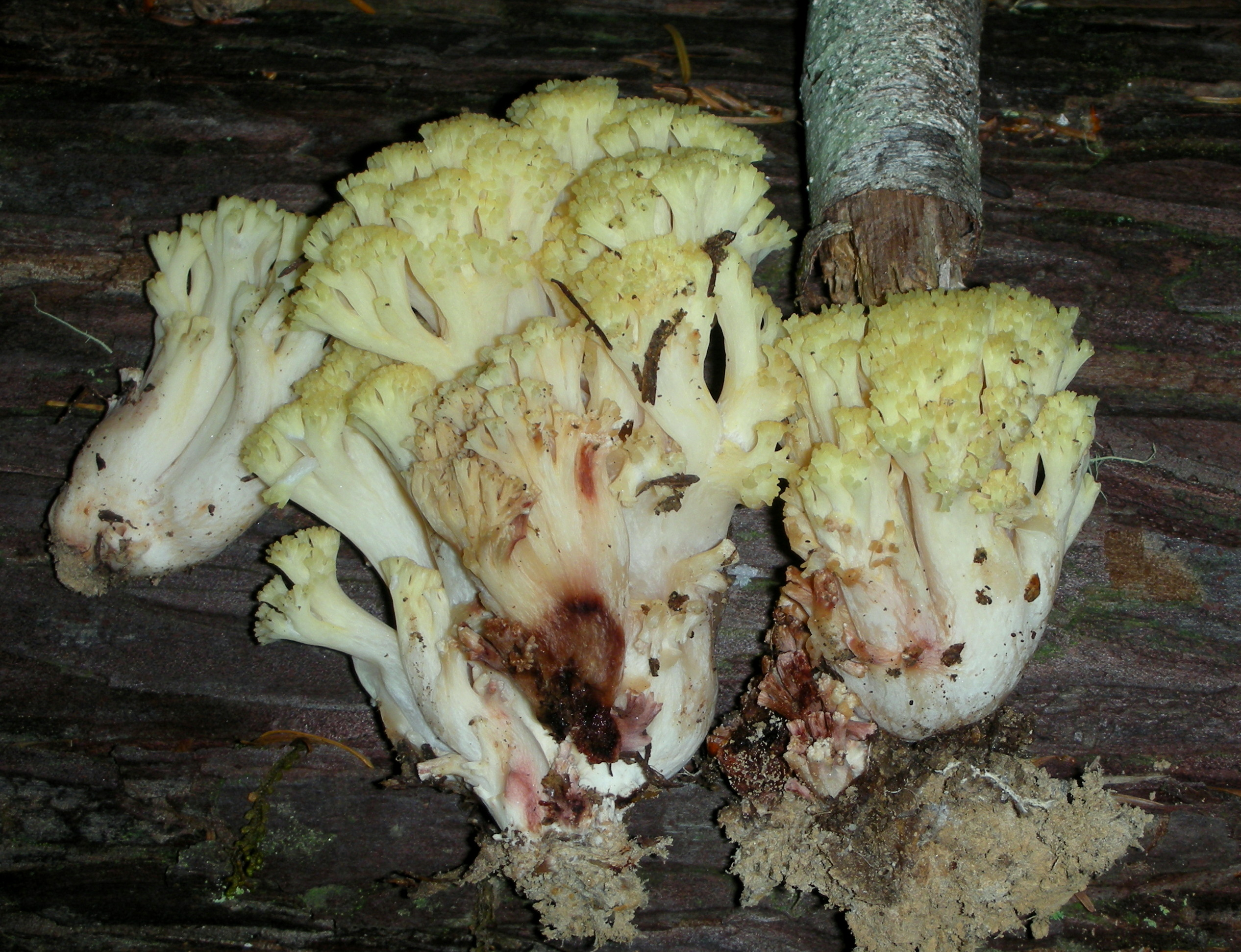

Scientific classification
- Kingdom: Fungi
- Division: Basidiomycota
- Class: Agaricomycetes
- Order: Gomphales
- Family: Gomphaceae
- Genus: Ramaria
- Species: R. rubiginosa

Binomial name
- Ramaria rubiginosa Marr & D.E.Stuntz (1974)

= Ramaria rubiginosa =

Species of fungus

Ramaria rubiginosa is a coral mushroom in the family Gomphaceae. It is found in North America.

The fruiting body is 6–12 cm tall and 4–10 cm wide. It is mostly white, with branch tips more yellow. The stalk is up to 4 cm wide, staining red due to bruising or age. The spores are yellowish.

Similar species include Ramaria acrisiccescens and Ramaria pallida.
