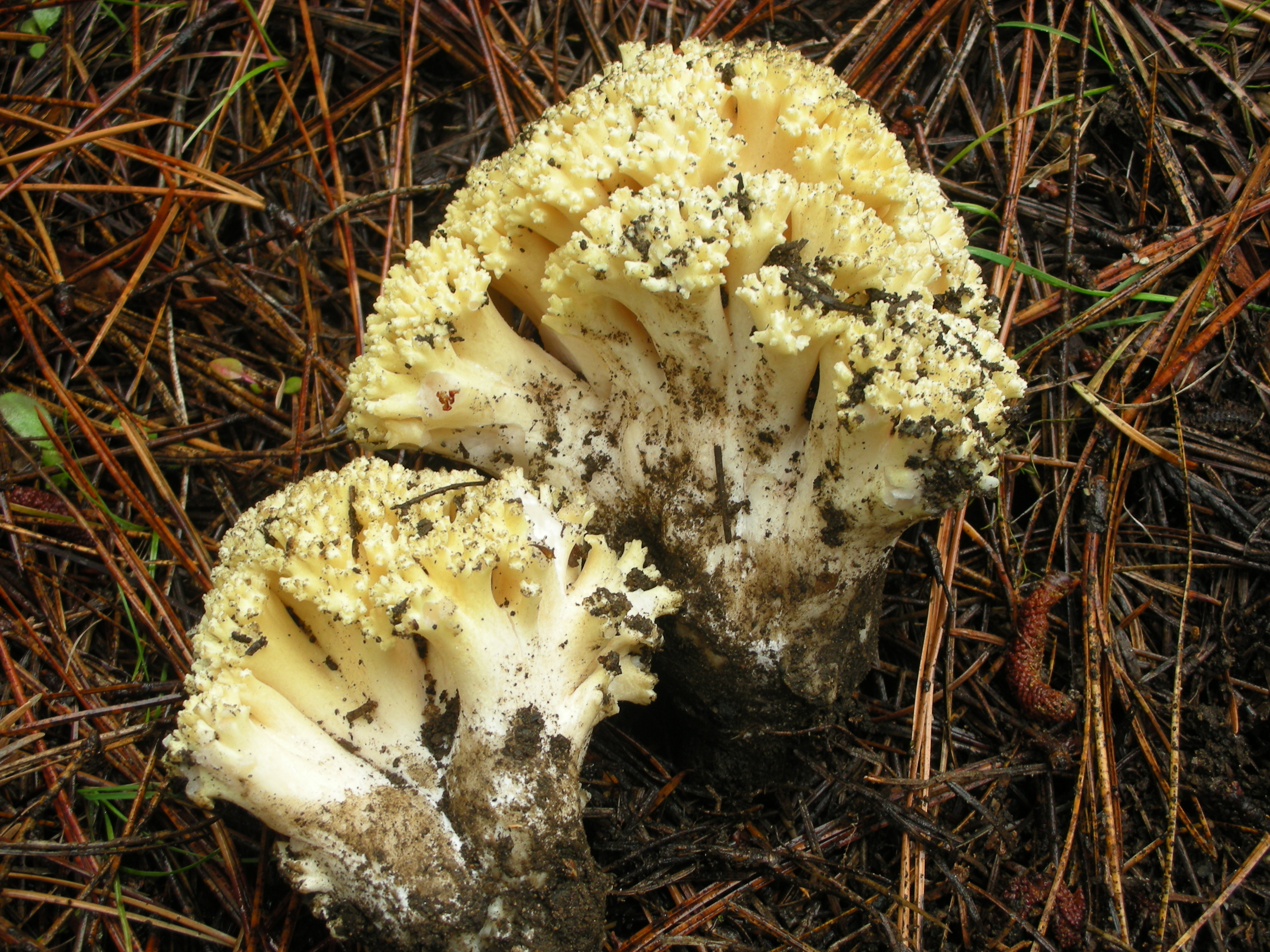

Scientific classification
- Kingdom: Fungi
- Division: Basidiomycota
- Class: Agaricomycetes
- Order: Gomphales
- Family: Gomphaceae
- Genus: Ramaria
- Species: R. rasilispora

Binomial name
- Ramaria rasilispora Marr & D.E.Stuntz (1974)

= Ramaria rasilispora =

Species of fungus

Ramaria rasilispora
- Mycological characteristics
- Smooth hymenium
- No distinct cap
- Hymenium attachment is irregular or not applicable
- Stipe is bare
- Spore print is yellow-orange
- Ecology is mycorrhizal
- Edibility is edible

Ramaria rasilispora, commonly known as the yellow coral, is a coral mushroom in the family Gomphaceae. Described as new to science in 1974, it is found in western North America south to Mexico and in the eastern Himalayas. It is edible for most people.

== Taxonomy ==
The species was first described scientifically in 1974 by American mycologists Currie Marr and Daniel Stuntz. The specific epithet rasilispora is derived from the roots rasil- (shaved, scraped, or worn smooth) and spora (spore). It is commonly known as the "yellow coral".

== Description ==
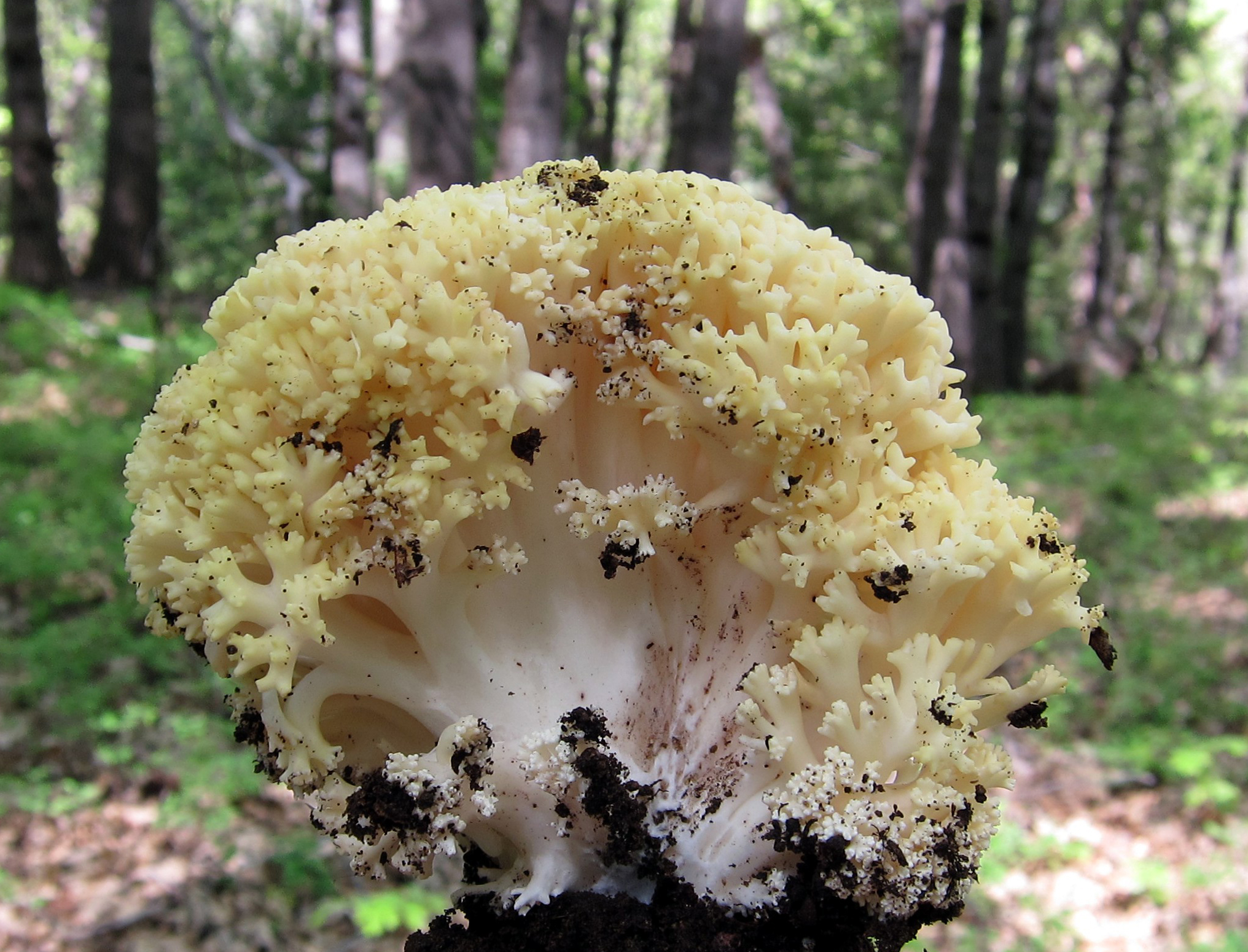
The fruit body branches abundantly from a thick, whitish stipe.

The fruit bodies are large and broad, measuring 5–30 centimetres (2–12 in) or more tall and wide. They originate from a single thick, conical stem measuring 3–8 cm (1 1/8–3 1/8 in) long and 2.5–7 cm (1–2 3/4 in) wide. The base can lead to several smooth branches, themselves branched twice or more. When young, the stipe and lower branches are whitish. The upper branches are yellow to apricot-yellow. The branch tips are initially yellow or the same color as the branch, but darken to brown in maturity. The primary branches are thick, from 2 to 4 cm (3/4 to 1 5/8 in) in diameter, while the upper branches are usually 0.2 to 1.5 cm (1/8 to 5/8 in) thick.

The context is fleshy to fibrous, but when dry has a consistency similar to bendable chalk. The fruit bodies have no distinctive taste or odor. The spore print is orangish yellow to ochraceous. The spores are cylindrical, with a surface texture ranging from smooth to finely warted, and measure 8–11 by 3–4 μm. The basidia (spore-bearing cells) are club-shaped, two- to four-spored (usually four), and measure 47–60 by 8–10 μm.

The variety R. rasilispora var. scatesina differs from the main type in the color of its fruit bodies, which, in both young and mature specimens, have branches that range from yellowish-white to light yellow.

=== Similar species ===
Similar species include Ramaria flavigelatinosa and R. magnipes, the latter of which is close in appearance to var. rasilispora.

== Habitat and distribution ==
The fruit bodies grow on the ground in coniferous forests. Fruiting occurs in spring and summer. Common in western North America, its range extends south to Mexico and north to Alaska. Variety rasilispora is found in the Pacific Northwest. Variety scatesina, originally collected in coniferous forests of Idaho, has since been reported growing in a deciduous forest in the eastern Himalayas.

== Edibility ==
The fruit bodies are edible for most people, but some report a negative reaction. According to David Arora, it is "quite popular" and said to be eaten raw in salads or candied like grapefruit rinds. The fungi are sold in traditional markets in the Mexican municipalities of Ozumba and Chalco.
