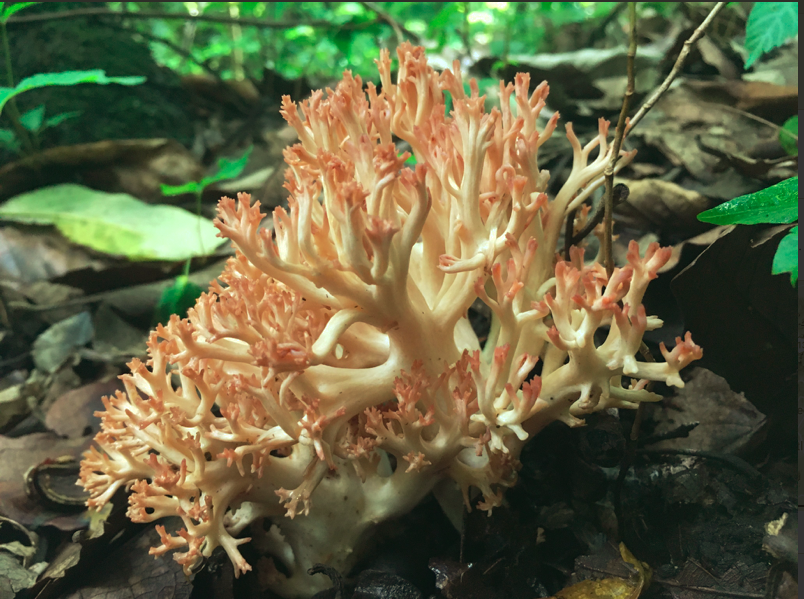

Scientific classification
- Kingdom: Fungi
- Division: Basidiomycota
- Class: Agaricomycetes
- Order: Gomphales
- Family: Gomphaceae
- Genus: Ramaria
- Species: R. subbotrytis

Binomial name
- Ramaria subbotrytis (Coker) Corner (1950)

Synonyms
- Clavaria subbotrytis Coker (1923)

= Ramaria subbotrytis =

Species of fungus

Ramaria subbotrytis is a species of coral fungus in the family Gomphaceae. It was previously classified in the family Ramariaceae, and before that in the genus Clavaria, family Clavariaceae. It was originally described as Clavaria subbotrytis by William Chambers Coker in 1923 from collections made in North Carolina. E.J.H. Corner transferred it to the genus Ramaria in 1950.

Ramaria subbotrytis accumulates arsenic and besides arsenic species known to be found in macrofungi, such as arsenobetaine, contains a very unusual organoarsenic compound homoarsenocholine. It grows in association with trees, especially conifers.

The species is listed as edible by some sources.

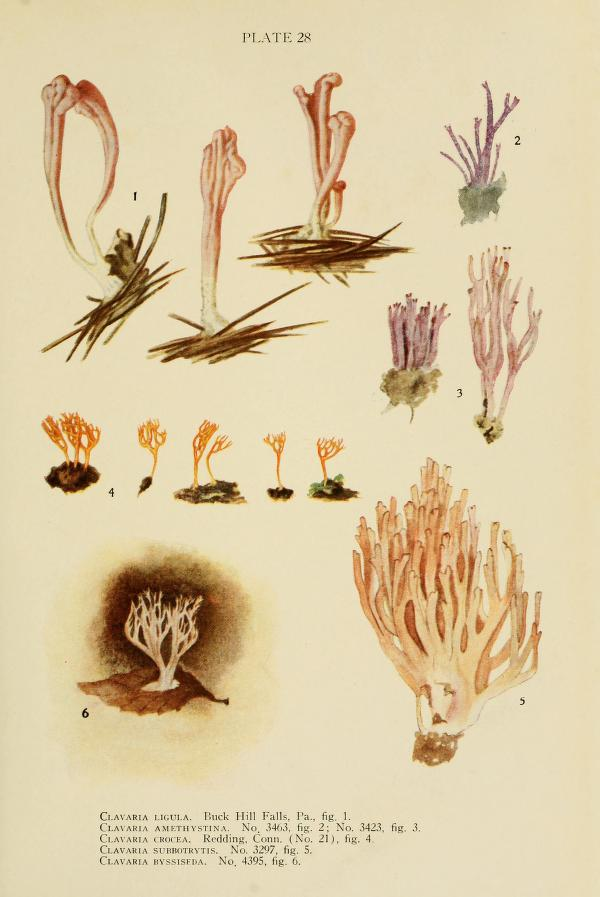
Coker's illustration of various Clavarias, with R. subbotrytis as figure 5

== Taxonomy and Phylogeny ==
Ramaria subbotrytis, first described as Clavaria subbotrytis by Coker in 1923, was moved to the genus Ramaria by Corner in 1950. A synonym of R. subbotrytis is therefore C. subbotrytis. The species has also undergone multiple other taxonomic changes, such as from the family Clavariaceae, to Ramariaceae, and most recently to the family Gomphaceae.

A recent phylogenetic study placed the genus Ramaria within the order Gomphales and the family Gomphaceae through ribosomal DNA analysis. References to unpublished analyses in the study theorize that Ramaria is monophyletic. The study places Ramaria as closely related to other hymenomycetes, including the genera Gomphus and Clavariadelphus, which all form a sister clade to another monophyletic group which includes gasteromycetes in the genera Sphaerobolus and Geastrum, and the order Phallales (represented in the study by genus Pseudocolus).

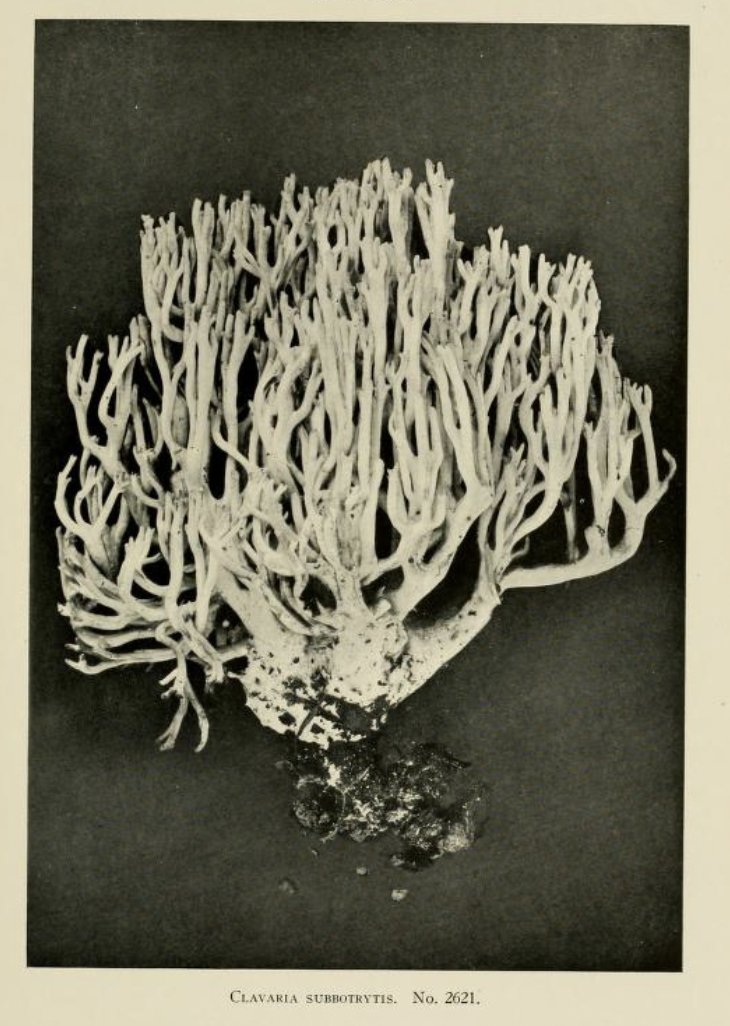
Coker's image of Clavaria subbotrytis holotype

== Morphology ==
R. subbotrytis is coral pink when immature, and fades to a creamy color except at the tips of the branches when it reaches maturity. It ranges from 7.5 to 15 centimeters tall and 5.5 to 9 centimeters wide.

The spores are produced on basidia lining the outer part of the branch tips. The basidia measure 6.5 to 9.5 micrometers, and are irregular and 4-spored. The hymenium is 55 to 65 micrometers thick with hyphae varying in size.

The spores are “nearly smooth, elliptic, cinnamon-ocraceous,” with hints of a rose color in the spore print. Coker measured the spores of one specimen between 3 to 3.7 by 7.4 to 9 micrometers, and the basidia of another specimen at 6.5 to 9.5 micrometers. He did not observe any clamp connections. Corner, however, described R. subbotrytis as having clamp connections in the basidia, but not in the hyphae.

The texture of R. subbotrytis is tender but not brittle. It has a short, clean, smooth, and glabrous stipe with no aborted branches. It tapers to a point on the base. Coker noted the flesh to sliver or peel when damaged.

Ramaria subbotrytis Mycological characteristics
- Smooth hymenium
- No distinct cap
- Stipe is bare
- Spore print is brown
- Ecology is mycorrhizal
- Edibility is edible but not recommended

== Chemical composition ==
Coker noted R. subbotrytis to have a “krauty” taste and odor, though only slightly.

In a 2018 study, R. subbotrytis was determined through HPLC and mass spectrometry to contain several rare arsenic species, including trimethylarsoniopropanate and dimethylarsinoylacetate, which had only been found previously in marine samples. The study also noted the presence of homoarsenocholine, a compound which had never before been observed in nature.

== Ecological relationships ==
As a member of Ramaria, R. subbotrytis forms ectomycorrhizal relationships with trees. Coker found his holotype at the base of a hickory tree. Ramaria are notable symbionts of conifers, especially in the Pacific Northwest, where their mycorrhiza have been studied in-depth. A study in this region on the identification of different Ramaria mycorrhiza showed that the mycorrhiza of different species in the genus are very morphologically similar and difficult to distinguish from one another. Furthermore, it characterized the mycorrhiza of Ramaria as forming mycelial mats below the soil which are made up of hyphae, mycorrhizal roots, and substrate.

R. subbotrytis has been described to be distributed throughout North America and Europe. The social network iNaturalist displays observations (both research grade and unverified) in both regions. It has been described in scientific literature as appearing in Slovakia, the Czech Republic, the Urals of Russia, the Jilotzingo region of Mexico, throughout the Iberian Peninsula, and throughout the United States and Canada, making the species widely geographically distributed. It was described in 2011 in Andalucía, Spain for the first time.

A study conducted about the mesofauna associated with different fungi in the province of Santa Ana Jilotzingo, Mexico found that collembolans and oribatid mites are the most prominent inhabitants of R. subbotrytis sporomes. Analysis of the mites’ and collembolans’ gut contents suggested a symbiotic relationship between the fungus and the arthropods, possibly involving spore dispersal due to the presence of spores in their digestive tracts.

== Edibility and traditional use ==
Many Ramaria species are used in traditional medicinal practices, and are traded commercially for these purposes or as food sources. Some sources consider Ramaria subbotrytis to be edible, though others list it as “unknown” and cite its known arsenic contents.

== Similar species ==
Coker lists several morphologically similar species to R. subbotrytis, including R. botrytis, R. conjunctipes var. odora, and R. formosa. It is distinguished from R. botrytis because R. subbotrytis has much darker spores and lacks red branch tips in its immature stages. R. conjunctipes var. odora is distinguishable by its more brittle, solid flesh, different odor, deeper colored flesh with tips that are the same color as the rest of the fruiting body, and a wider and less compound base. It differs from R. formosa which is much more brittle and has yellow tips in immature stages, as well as a deeper pink color and narrower and smoother cinnamon colored spores than R. subbotrytis.

Coker also described R. subbotrytis var. intermedia, which is an intermediate species between R. botrytis and R. subbotrytis. It has a similar body and base morphology to R. botrytis, but the same spore color and shape as R. subbotrytis. For that reason, Coker chose to classify it as a variant of R. subbotrytis.
