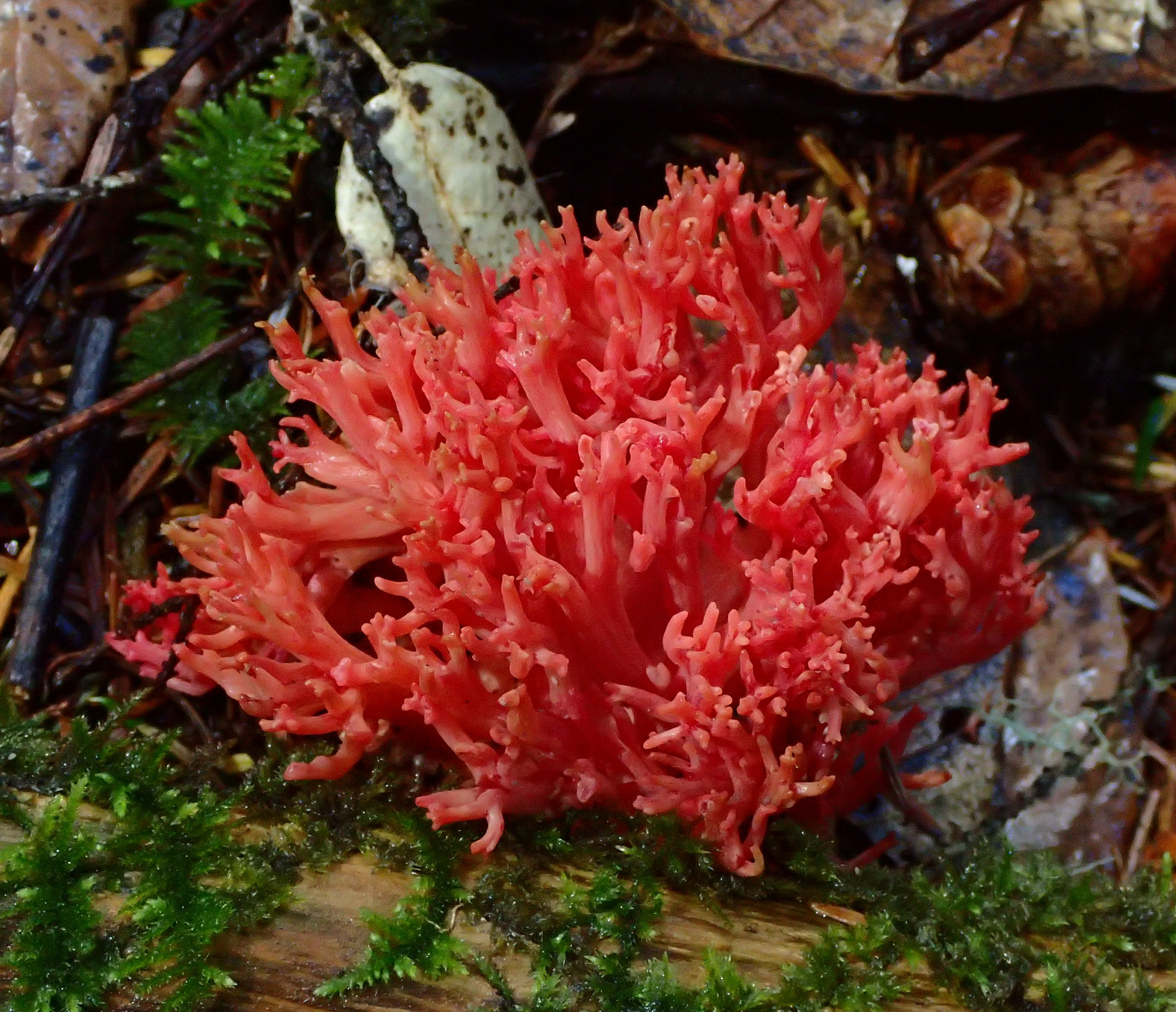

Conservation status
- Apparently Secure (NatureServe)

Scientific classification
- Kingdom: Fungi
- Division: Basidiomycota
- Class: Agaricomycetes
- Order: Gomphales
- Family: Gomphaceae
- Genus: Ramaria
- Species: R. araiospora

Binomial name
- Ramaria araiospora Marr & D.E.Stuntz (1974)

= Ramaria araiospora =

Species of fungus

Ramaria araiospora
- Mycological characteristics
- Smooth hymenium
- No distinct cap
- Hymenium attachment is irregular or not applicable
- Stipe is bare
- Ecology is mycorrhizal

Ramaria araiospora, commonly known as the red coral, is a coral mushroom in the family Gomphaceae. First described in 1974, it is found in North America and the Himalayas. It is sold as food in local markets in Mexico.

== Taxonomy ==
The species was first described scientifically by mycologists Currie Marr and Daniel Stuntz in their 1974 monograph, "Ramaria of western Washington". The holotype was collected in 1967 in Pierce County, Washington. Marr and Stuntz also published the variety rubella, which was originally collected in 1967 about 5 miles (8.0 km) south of Elbe, Washington. Ramaria araiospora is classified in the subgenus Laeticolora of Ramaria. The mushroom is commonly known as the "red coral".

== Description ==
The fruit bodies typically measure 5–14 cm (2–5 1/2 in) tall by 2–10 cm (3/4–4 in) wide. There is a single, somewhat bulbous stipe measuring 2–3 cm (3/4–1 1/8 in) long by 1.5–2 cm (5/8–3/4 in) thick, which is branched up to six times. The branches are slender, usually about 1–5 mm (1/16–3/16 in) in diameter, while branches near the base are thicker, up to 4 cm (1 5/8 in) thick. The terminal branches are forked or finely divided into sharp tips. The context is fleshy to fibrous in young specimens, but becomes brittle when dried. The branches are red initially, fading to a lighter red in maturity, while the base, including the stipe, is white to yellowish-white. Branch tips are yellow. When dried, fruit bodies become yellowish white in the base and dull red in the branches. The fruit bodies have no distinctive taste or odor.

In deposit, the spores are white, cream, or yellowish. They are somewhat cylindrical, ornamented with lobed warts, and measure 9.9 by 3.7 μm. The basidia (spore-bearing cells) are club-shaped, one- to four-spored (although four spores is most typical), and have dimensions of 43–75 by 7–12 μm. The variety rubella differs from the main type in having slightly more "bluish or crimson" branches in mature specimens, and slightly smaller basidia that measure 30–70 by 6–10 μm.

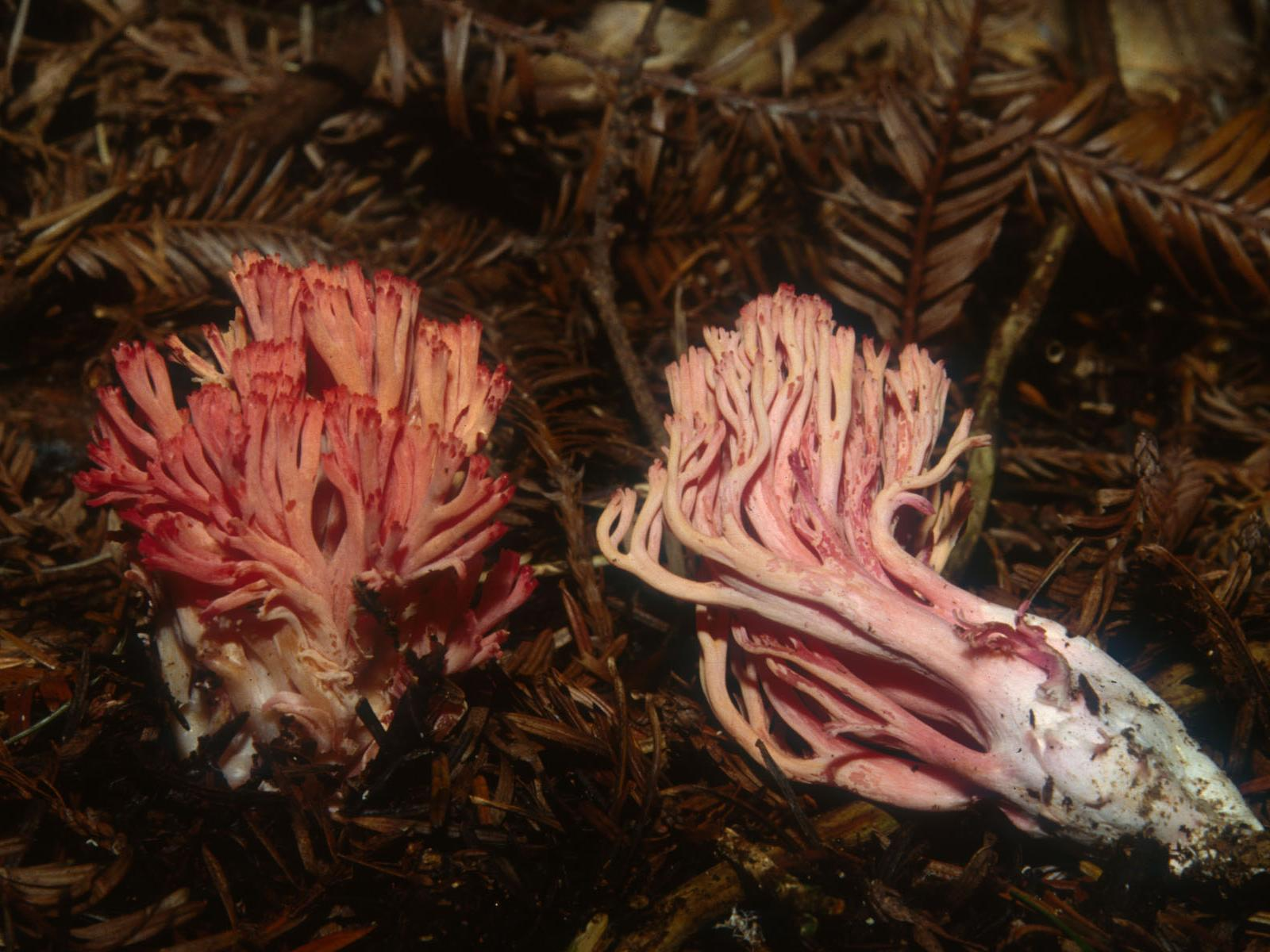
The red color fades in mature specimens.

=== Similar species ===
Ramaria stuntzii is similar in appearance, with a larger base, reddish-orange branches below, and is amyloid (unlike R. araiospora). R. cyaneigranosa is also similar, varying mostly in microscopic details.

Faded specimens could be confused with the toxic R. formosa.

== Habitat and distribution ==
Although it is not known with certainty, the species is probably mycorrhizal. Fruit bodies grow on the ground singly or scattered, under conifers, especially western hemlock, and deciduous trees, particularly tanoak. Fruiting usually occurs in September and November. The species is primarily known from the Pacific Northwest region of North America, although it (or a very similar, undescribed species) has been reported from Kansas. Variety rubella has been collected in the eastern Himalayas and Mexico.

== Edibility ==
The fruit bodies might be edible, but can result in an upset stomach. In the Villa del Carbón municipality of Mexico, where they are known locally as patitas de pájaro ("bird's legs"), patitas temblonas ("trembling legs"), or patitas rojas ("red legs"), the fungi are favored for their fleshy consistency, mild flavor, and abundance. They are usually sold in lots averaging 480 grams (17 oz) (containing about 15 fruit bodies), at a price between $10 and 20 USD.
