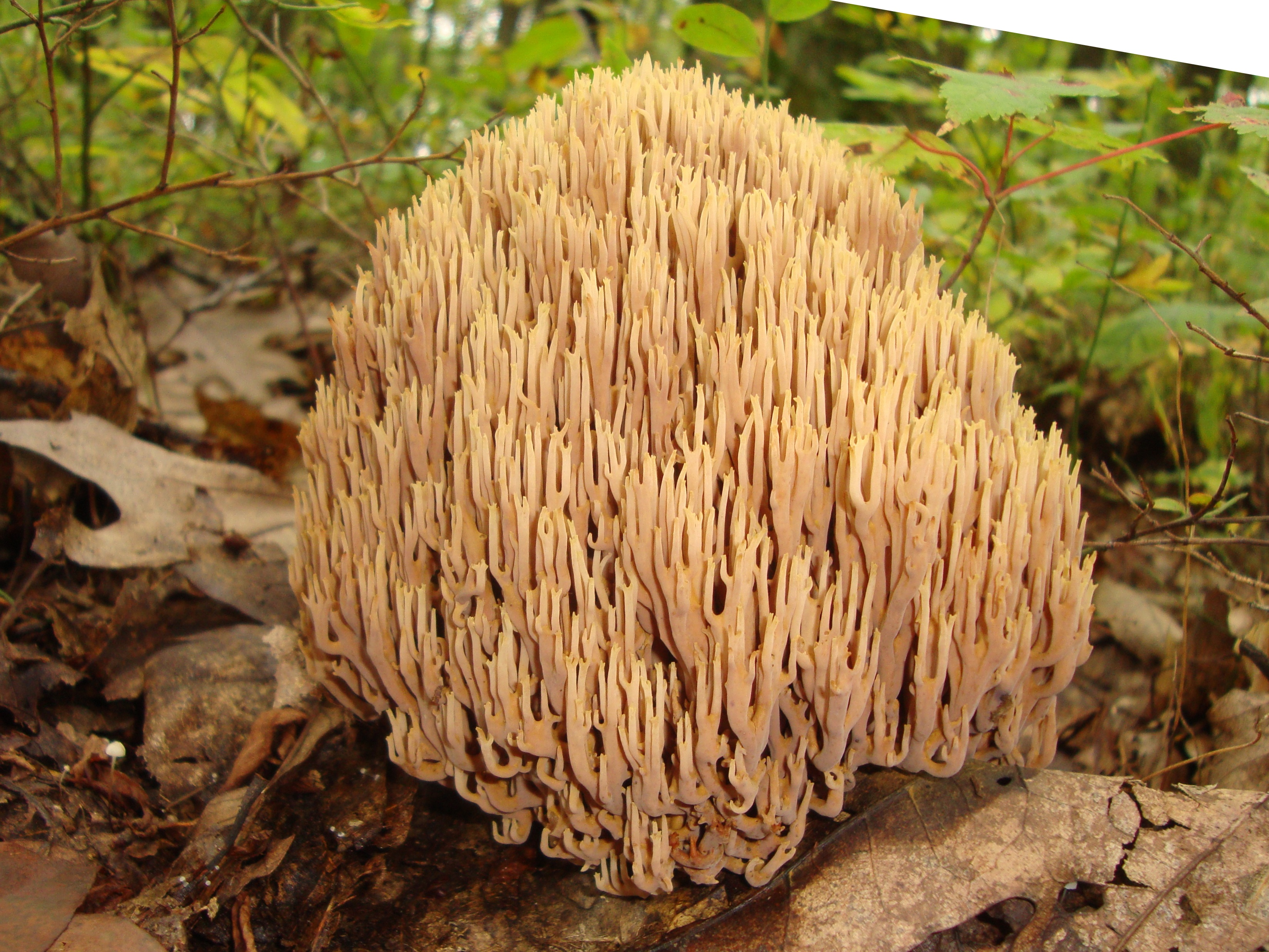

Scientific classification
- Kingdom: Fungi
- Division: Basidiomycota
- Class: Agaricomycetes
- Order: Gomphales
- Family: Gomphaceae
- Genus: Ramaria
- Species: R. stricta

Binomial name
- Ramaria stricta (Pers.) Quél. (1888)

Synonyms
- Clavaria stricta Pers. (1795); Clavaria syringarum Pers. (1822); Merisma strictum (Pers.) Spreng. (1827); Clavaria pruinella Ces. (1861); Clavariella stricta (Pers.) P.Karst. (1882); Corallium stricta (Pers.) G.Hahn (1883); Lachnocladium odoratum G.F.Atk. (1908)

= Ramaria stricta =

Ramaria stricta Mycological characteristics
- Smooth hymenium
- No distinct cap
- Hymenium attachment is irregular or not applicable
- Stipe is bare
- Spore print is yellow
- Ecology is mycorrhizal
- Edibility is inedible

Ramaria stricta, commonly known as the strict-branch coral or strict coral mushroom, is a coral fungus of the genus Ramaria. Its fruit body is up to 10 cm (4 in) tall, made of multiple slender, compact, and vertical parallel branches. Its color is typically light tan to vinaceous-brown. All parts of the mushroom bruise when handled. There are several lookalikes that can usually be distinguished from R. stricta by differences in coloration, bruising reaction, or microscopic features.

The species has a cosmopolitan distribution and grows on dead wood, stumps, trunks, and branches of both deciduous and coniferous trees. The fungus is inedible due to its unpleasant odor and bitter taste.

== Taxonomy ==
The species was originally described under the name Clavaria stricta by Christian Hendrik Persoon in 1795. In 1888, French mycologist Lucien Quélet transferred the species to the genus Ramaria.

It is commonly known as the "upright coral".

== Description ==
The color of the fruit body is brownish to yellow, becoming paler toward extremities. It bruises light reddish brown. The basidiocarp has a leathery texture when fresh, but becomes brittle when dry. Growing from a whitish base, the stipe is branched up to 8 times, the branches all upright and nearly parallel, each ending in 4 to 5 thornlike tips. Overall, the fruit body appears bushy, and is medium-sized, up to 10 by 7 cm (4 by 2 3/4 in). The stipe is single or branching from the base, with white mycelium and rhizomorphs radiating from the base. The odor is of anise and the taste is bitter.

The spore print is dark yellow. The spores are roughly elliptical, dotted with low cyanophilous warts, and measure 7–10 by 3.5–5.5 μm. The basidia have basal clamps, are mostly four-spored, and sometimes have cyanophilous granular contents.

=== Variants ===
Several variants have been described:

var. alba
var. concolor
var. fumida
var. violaceo-tincta

=== Similar species ===
Another widespread and common coral, R. apiculata, typically grows on conifer wood and bruises brown like R. stricta, but has green pigmentation. R. apiculata is a dull buff-tan to dull orange-brown and the young fruit bodies often have white branch tips. R. gracilis prefers conifer wood and has lighter colors than R. stricta. The tropical R. moelleriana can only be reliably distinguished from R. sticta by location and microscopic characteristics. R. flava is mycorrhizal and grows under coniferous and deciduous trees. Its fruit bodies are typically taller, with a more unpleasant odor and a less bitter taste. R. rubella (also known as R. acris) is pinkish tan and R. tsugina stains green.

== Distribution and habitat ==
Ramaria stricta has a cosmopolitan distribution, and is a fairly common species. The fungus is lignicolous, common in late summer and fall in coniferous forests of the Pacific Coast and Rocky Mountains. The fungus grows on dead wood, stumps, trunks, and branches of both leafy and coniferous trees. The form that grows on deciduous wood tends to be more orange and less bushy than those which grow on coniferous wood. The fruit bodies can form in "log lines" where decaying wood is buried underground near the surface or is in an advanced state of decomposition.

== Edibility ==
The fruit body has been described as "edible but unpalatable", but later field guides say it is inedible.
