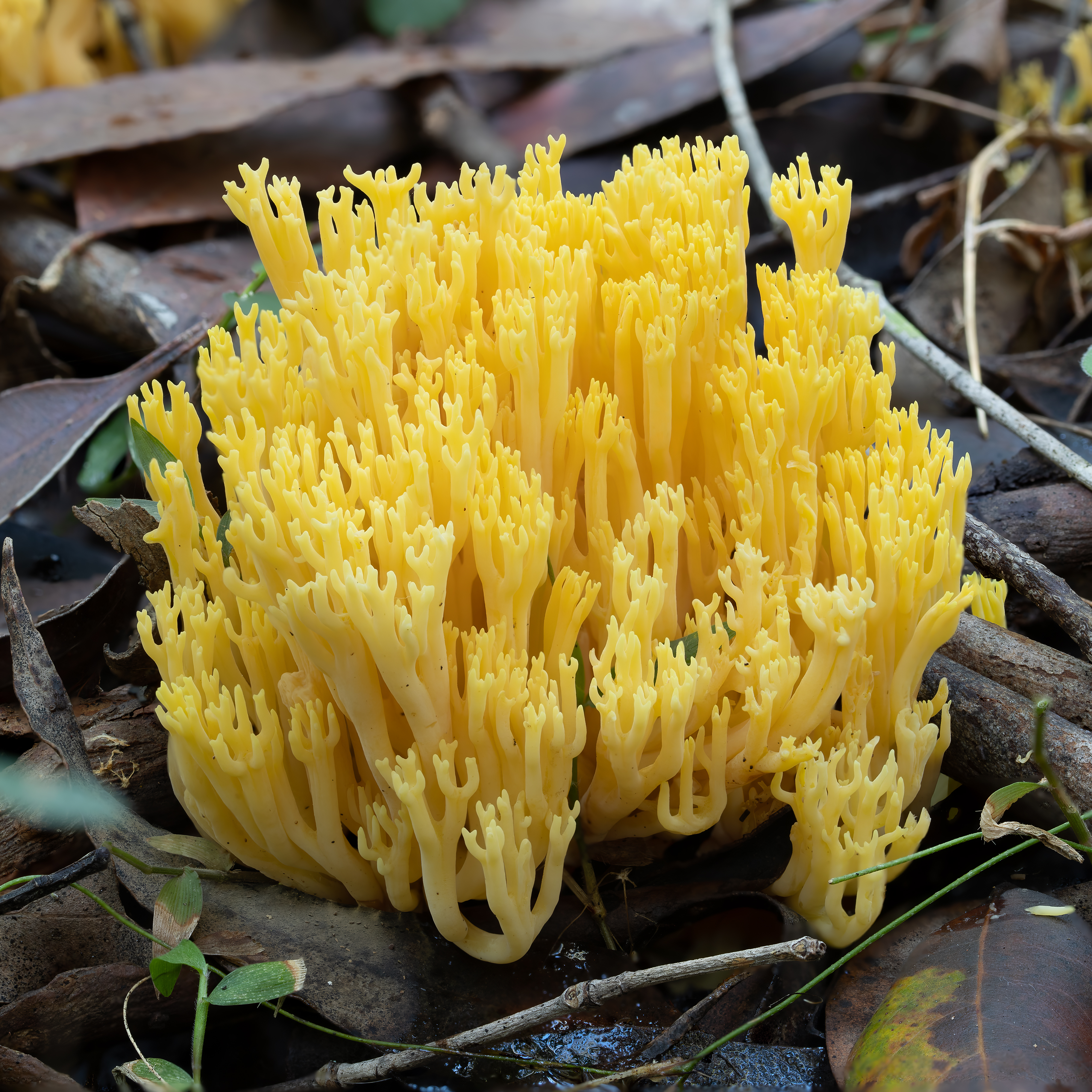
- Ramaria lorithamnus

Scientific classification
- Kingdom: Fungi
- Division: Basidiomycota
- Class: Agaricomycetes
- Order: Gomphales
- Family: Gomphaceae
- Genus: Ramaria; Fr. ex Bonord. (1851)

Type species
- Ramaria botrytis (Pers.: Fr.) Ricken (1918)

= Ramaria =

Genus of fungi

The genus Ramaria comprises approximately 200 species of coral fungi. Several, such as Ramaria flava, are edible and picked in Europe, though they are easily confused with several mildly poisonous species capable of causing nausea, vomiting, and diarrhea; these include R. formosa and R. pallida. Three Ramaria species have been demonstrated to contain a very unusual organoarsenic compound homoarsenocholine.

== Etymology ==
The genus name is derived from Latin rāmus meaning branch.

== Description ==
Basidiocarps may range in color from bright yellow, red, pink, or orange, to purple, white, and shades of tan. Color changes after bruising occur in some species.

The spores of Ramaria species are yellow-brown to rusty-brown in mass deposit and range from smooth to warted to echinulate or striate. Spore size may vary considerably, and ornamentation, when present, is cyanophilous.

== Classification ==
Hjomsköld was the first to introduce the name Ramaria in 1790. Persoon later described R. botrytis, and placed it in the genus Clavaria. Fries sanctioned the name Clavaria in 1821 and treated Ramaria as a section of Clavaria. In 1933, Donk elevated the name Ramaria to its current generic status by recognizing Bonorden's use of the name Ramaria. Currently, Ramaria is placed in the Gomphaceae, although some older sources still classify it in the Ramariaceae. Ramaria has been further subdivided into four subgenera based on differences in spore ornamentation, substrate habitat, clamps, and basidiocarp appearance.

Phylogenetic analyses has shown that Ramaria is not monophyletic, and that the characteristic coralloid shape has likely evolved several times from different ancestors.

== Species ==
- R. acrisiccescens
- R. acutissima
- R. aenea
- R. africana
- R. albidoflava
- R. albocinerea
- R. alborosea
- R. altaica
- R. ambigua
- R. americana
- R. amyloidea
- R. anisata
- R. anziana
- R. apiahyna
- R. apiculata
- R. araiospora
- R. arcosuensis
- R. argentea
- R. armeniaca
- R. articulotela
- R. asiatica
- R. atkinsonii
- R. aurantiisiccescens
- R. aurea
- R. aureofulva
- R. aureorhiza
- R. australiana
- R. avellaneovertex
- R. basirobusta
- R. bonii
- R. botrytis
- R. botrytoides
- R. bourdotiana
- R. brevispora
- R. brienzensis
- R. broomei
- R. brunneicontusa
- R. brunneipes
- R. brunneomaculata
- R. bulbobasidiata
- R. cacao
- R. camelicolor
- R. camellia
- R. campestris
- R. campoi
- R. candida
- R. canescens
- R. capitata
- R. capucina
- R. caulifloriformis
- R. celerivirescens
- R. cettoi
- R. cinereocarnea
- R. cladoniae
- R. clarobrunnea
- R. claviramulata
- R. cokeri
- R. conjuncta
- R. conjunctipes
- R. coulterae
- R. curta
- R. cyaneigranosa
- R. cystidiophora
- R. daucipes
- R. decurrens
- R. distinctissima
- R. divaricata
- R. dolomitica
- R. echinovirens
- R. eosanguinea
- R. ephemeroderma
- R. eryuanensis
- R. fagetorum
- R. fagicola
- R. fennica
- R. filicicola
- R. filicina
- R. fistulosa
- R. flaccida
- R. flava
- R. flavescens
- R. flaviceps
- R. flavicolor
- R. flavigelatinosa
- R. flavoalba
- R. flavobrunnescens
- R. flavoides
- R. flavomicrospora
- R. flavosalmonicolor
- R. flavosaponaria
- R. flavoviridis
- R. flavula
- R. foetida
- R. formosa
- R. fragillima
- R. fumosiavellanea
- R. fuscobrunnea
- R. gelatiniaurantia
- R. gelatinosa
- R. gigantea
- R. glaucoaromatica
- R. gracilis
- R. grandipes
- R. grandis
- R. griseobrunnea
- R. grundii
- R. guyanensis
- R. gypsea
- R. harrisonii
- R. hemirubella
- R. henriquesii
- R. highlandensis
- R. hilaris
- R. himalayensis
- R. holorubella
- R. ignicolor
- R. incognita
- R. incongrua
- R. indoyunnaniana
- R. inedulis
- R. inquinata
- R. insignis
- R. intimorosea
- R. invalii
- R. junquilleavertex
- R. kisantuensis
- R. lacteobrunnescens
- R. laeviformosoides
- R. laevispora
- R. largentii
- R. leptoformosa
- R. linearioides
- R. longicaulis
- R. longispora
- R. longissimispora
- R. lorithamnus
- R. luteoflaccida
- R. maculatipes
- R. maculospora
- R. madagascariensis
- R. magnifica
- R. magnipes
- R. marrii
- R. mediterranea
- R. moelleriana
- R. murrillii
- R. mutabilis
- R. myceliosa
- R. nanispora
- R. neoformosa
- R. obtusissima
- R. ochracea
- R. ochrochlora
- R. pallida
- R. pallidissima
- R. pallidosaponaria
- R. palmata
- R. pancaribbea
- R. patagonica
- R. perbrunnea
- R. perfluopunicea
- R. petersenii
- R. piedmontiana
- R. polonica
- R. polypus
- R. primulina
- R. prostrata
- R. pseudobotrytis
- R. pseudogracilis
- R. pumila
- R. pupulispora
- R. pura
- R. purpureopallida
- R. purpurissima
- R. pusilla
- R. pyrispora
- R. rainierensis
- R. rasilispora
- R. raveneliana
- R. reticulata
- R. rielii
- R. roellinii
- R. rosella
- R. rotundispora
- R. rubella
- R. rubiginosa
- R. rubriattenuipes
- R. rubribrunnescens
- R. rubricarnata
- R. rubrievanescens
- R. rubripermanens
- R. rubrogelatinosa
- R. samuelsii
- R. sandaracina
- R. sanguinea
- R. sanguinipes
- R. sardiniensis
- R. schildii
- R. sclerocarnosa
- R. secunda
- R. sesiana
- R. sinoconjunctipes
- R. solomonensis
- R. somniculosa
- R. spinulosa
- R. strasseri
- R. stricta
- R. stuntzii
- R. subaurantiaca
- R. subbotrytis
- R. subgelatinosa
- R. subtilis
- R. subviolacea
- R. suecica
- R. synaptopoda
- R. terrea
- R. testaceoflava
- R. testaceoviolacea
- R. thalliovirescens
- R. thiersii
- R. toxica
- R. tridentina
- R. tropicalis
- R. tsugina
- R. valdiviana
- R. varians
- R. velocimutans
- R. verlotensis
- R. vinaceipes
- R. vinosimaculans
- R. violaceibrunnea
- R. watlingii
- R. xanthosperma
- R. zeppelinospora
- R. zippelii
