= Coralloides =

Coralloides may refer to:

- Coralloides N.M.Wolf, 1776, a genus of fungi in the family Cladoniaceae, synonym of Cladonia
- Coralloides G.F.Hoffmann, 1789, a genus of fungi in the family Stereocaulaceae, synonym of Stereocaulon
- Coralloides de Tournefort ex Maratti, 1822, a genus of fungi in the family Gomphaceae, synonym of Ramaria
