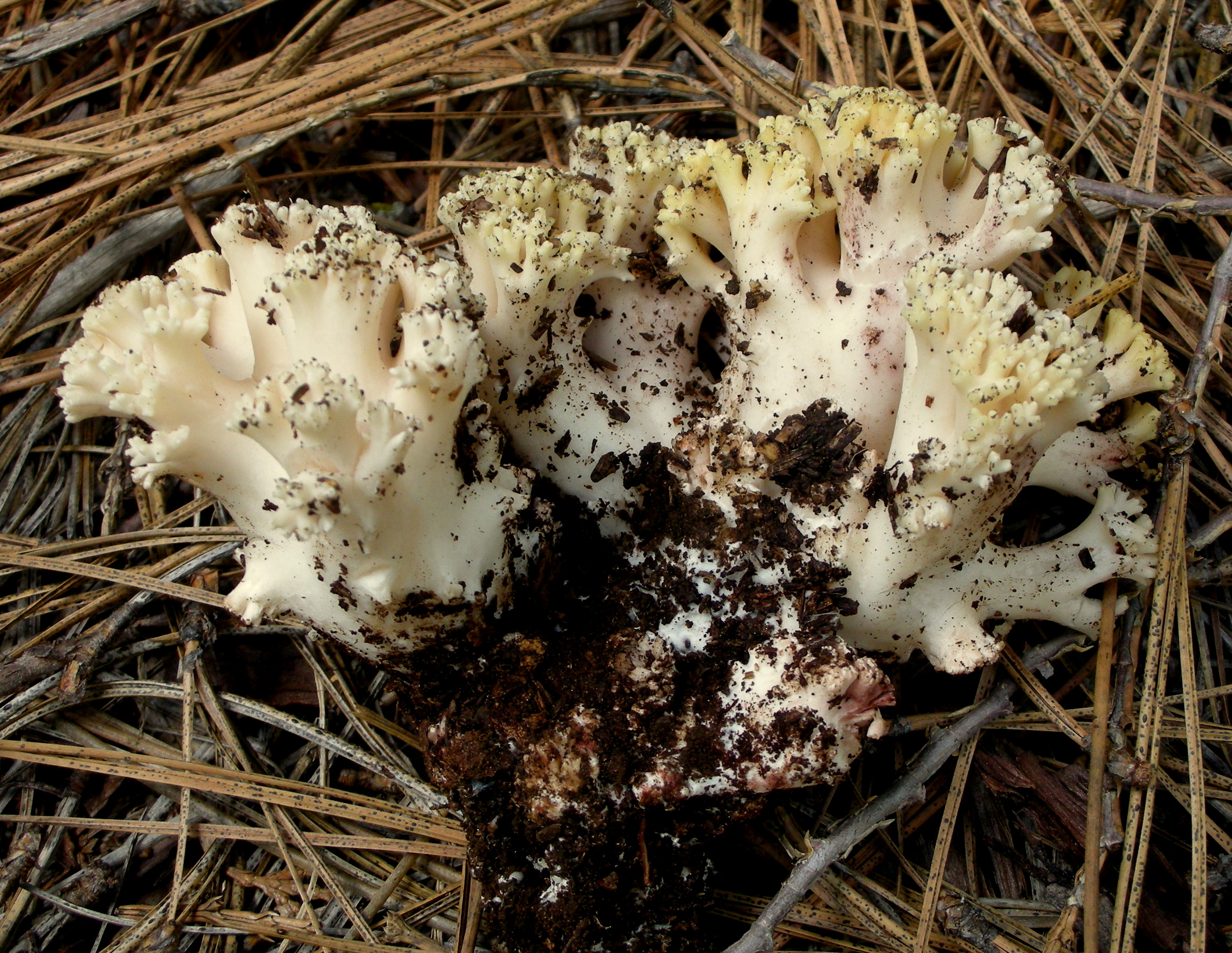

Scientific classification
- Domain: Eukaryota
- Kingdom: Fungi
- Division: Basidiomycota
- Class: Agaricomycetes
- Order: Gomphales
- Family: Gomphaceae
- Genus: Ramaria
- Species: R. vinosimaculans

Binomial name
- Ramaria vinosimaculans Marr & D.E.Stuntz (1974)

= Ramaria vinosimaculans =

Species of fungus

Ramaria vinosimaculans, commonly known as the wine-staining coral, is a coral mushroom in the family Gomphaceae. It is found in North America.
