= R. flavescens =

R. flavescens may refer to:

- Ramaria flavescens, a clavarioid fungus
- Ramariopsis flavescens, a coral fungus
- Rhysotoechia flavescens, a tropical rainforest tree
