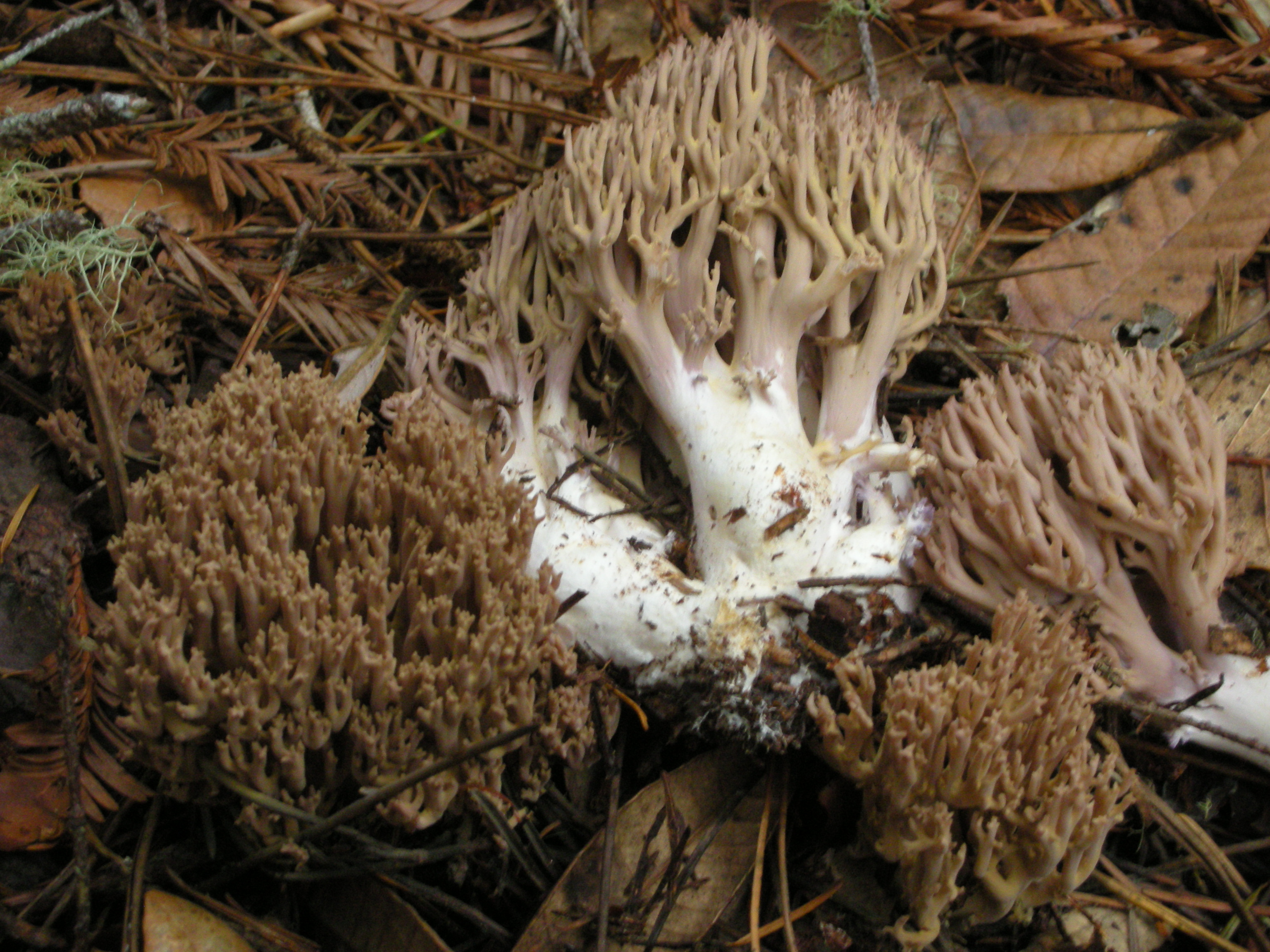

Scientific classification
- Domain: Eukaryota
- Kingdom: Fungi
- Division: Basidiomycota
- Class: Agaricomycetes
- Order: Gomphales
- Family: Gomphaceae
- Genus: Ramaria
- Species: R. fennica

Binomial name
- Ramaria fennica (P.Karst.) Ricken (1920)

Synonyms
- Clavaria fennica P.Karst. (1868)

= Ramaria fennica =

Species of fungus

Ramaria fennica, commonly known as the bitter coral, is a coral mushroom in the family Gomphaceae. It is found in Australia, Europe and North America.

== Taxonomy ==
Petter Karsten first described the species in 1868 under the name Clavaria fennica, based on collections made in Finnish fir woods. Adalbert Ricken transferred it to the genus Ramaria in 1920.

The specific epithet fennica refers to Finland, where the original collections were made. It is commonly known as the "bitter coral".

== Description ==
The fruit body consist of numerous branches that arise from usually two to four large primary upright branches, which themselves originate from a single thick, fleshy base. The overall dimensions of the fruit body are 6–18 cm (2 1/4–7 in) tall by 5–12 cm (2–4 3/4 in) wide. Unlike many larger species of Ramaria, the fruit bodies are usually taller than they are wide.

The surface of the branches is smooth and they can range in color from olive-grey to olive-umber to smokey-yellow, grayish-tan, or yellow brown. The primary branches are darker, olive-brown tinged with violet when fresh. The thick and fleshy stalk is white below, its color becoming the same as the branch color near the top. The flesh is white, firm, and brittle.

Ramaria fennica produces a pale yellowish-tan spore print. The spores are elliptical, covered with tiny spines, and measure 5.5–8 by 3–4.5 μm. The edibility of the coral is not known with certainty, but its sometimes bitter taste and thin flesh make it unappealing.

=== Similar species ===
Ramaria fumiosiavellanea is similar in coloration, but has a much reduced stem.

== Habitat and distribution ==
Fruit bodies grow on the ground singly, scattered, or in groups, often with tanoak (in North America). A generally uncommon species, it sometimes fruits prolifically. It is also known from Europe and Australia.
