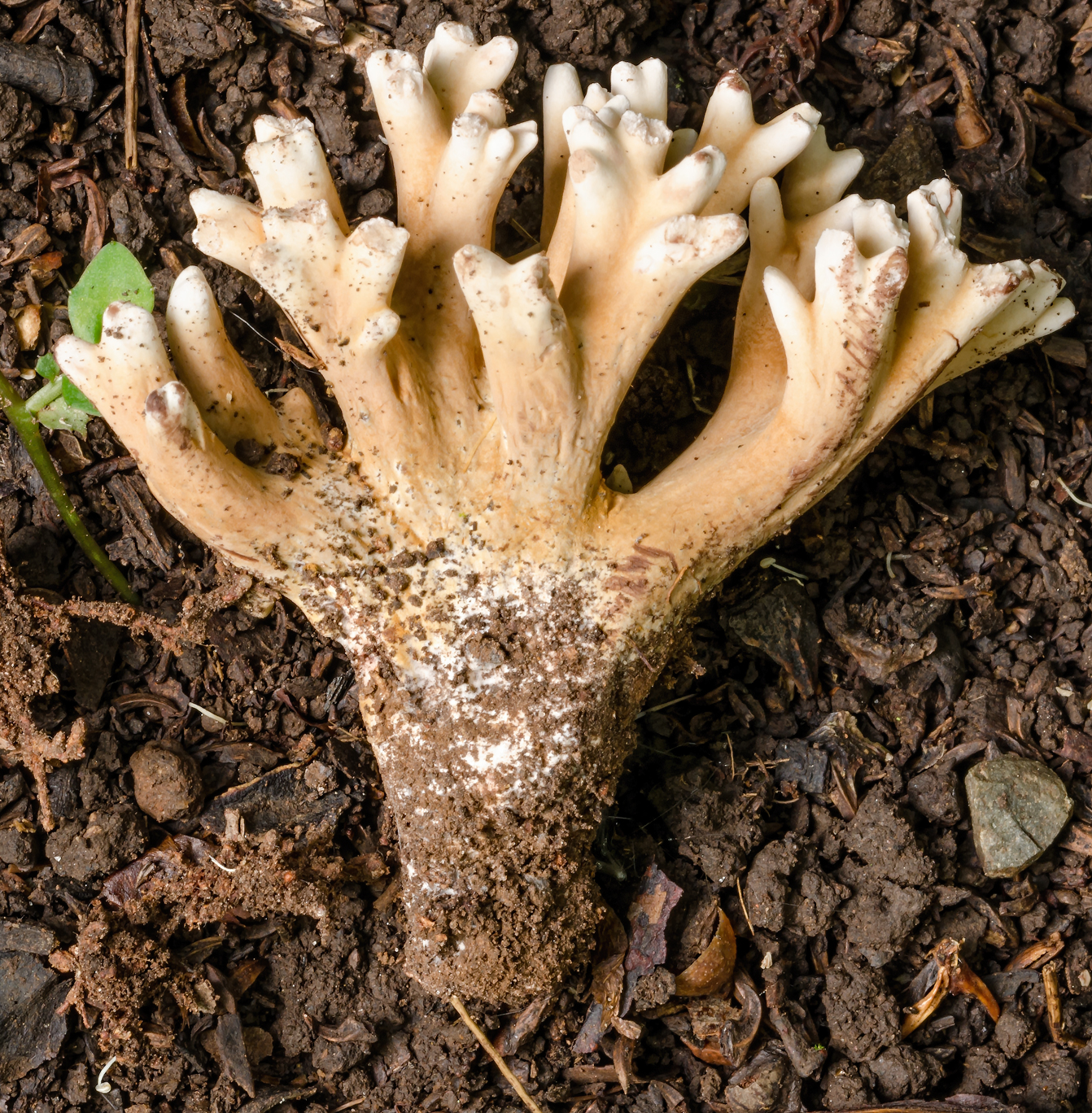

Scientific classification
- Domain: Eukaryota
- Kingdom: Fungi
- Division: Basidiomycota
- Class: Agaricomycetes
- Order: Gomphales
- Family: Gomphaceae
- Genus: Ramaria
- Species: R. capitata

Binomial name
- Ramaria capitata (Lloyd) Corner (1950)

Synonyms
- Clavaria capitata Lloyd (1922); Capitoclavaria capitata Lloyd (1922); Clavaria ochraceosalmonicolor Cleland (1931); Ramaria ochraceosalmonicolor (Cleland) Corner (1950); Ramaria capitata var. ochraceosalmonicolor (Cleland) A.M.Young & N.A.Fechner (2007)

= Ramaria capitata =

Species of fungus

Ramaria capitata is a species of coral fungus in the family Gomphaceae. It is found in Australia, where it is widespread and relatively common.

== Taxonomy ==
The species was first described by American mycologist Curtis Gates Lloyd in 1922 as Clavaria capitata, from collections sent to him by Australian botanist Edwin James Semmens. Lloyd noted that it was unusual for a Clavaria species to have the fertile, spore-bearing surface (the hymenium) confined to terminal heads, rather than over the surface of the stems and branches. He humorously proposed the new genus Capitoclavaria using his pen name, Professor McGinty. The fungus was transferred to the genus Ramaria in 1950 by E.J.H. Corner.
