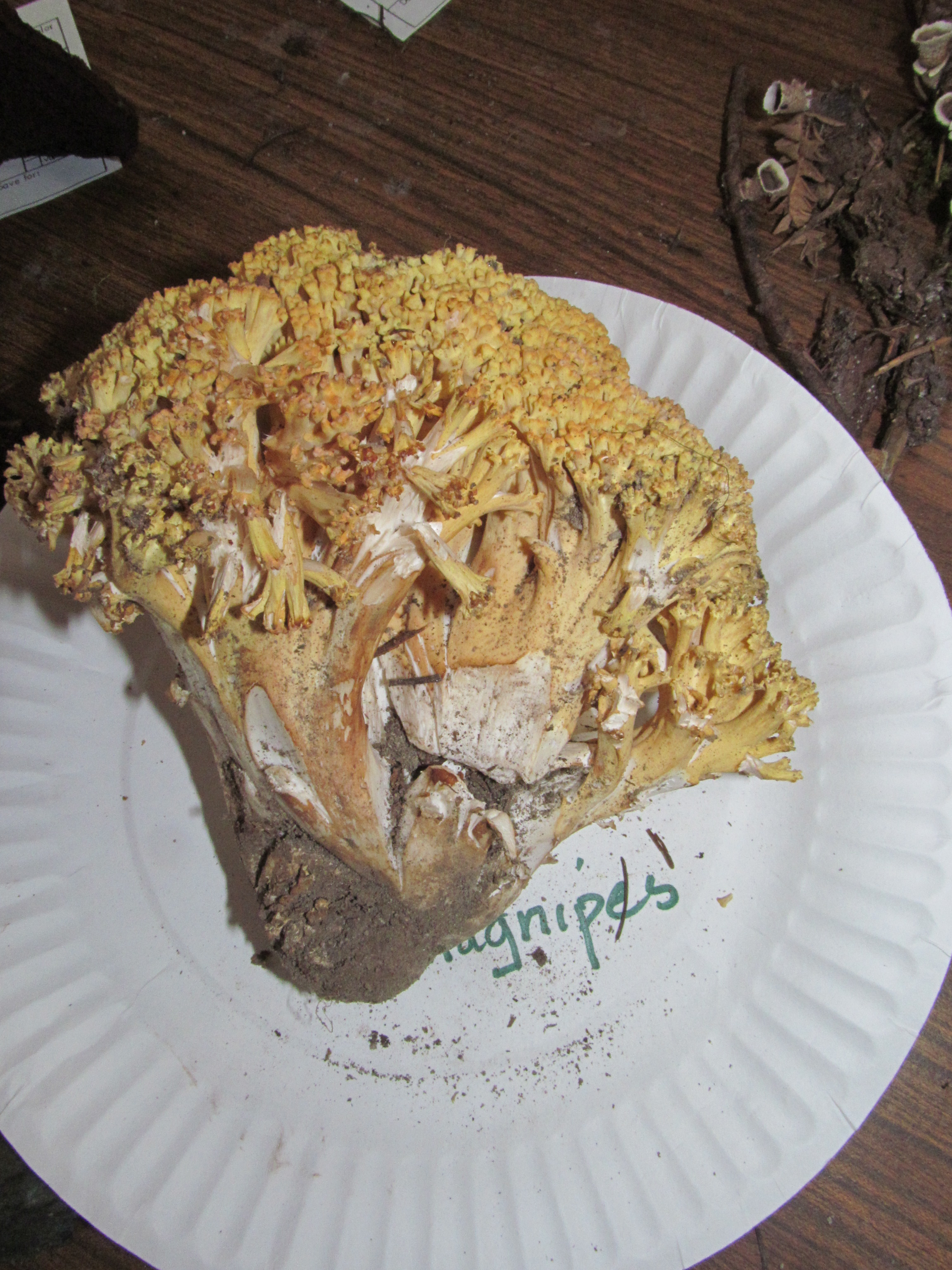

Scientific classification
- Domain: Eukaryota
- Kingdom: Fungi
- Division: Basidiomycota
- Class: Agaricomycetes
- Order: Gomphales
- Family: Gomphaceae
- Genus: Ramaria
- Species: R. magnipes

Binomial name
- Ramaria magnipes Marr & D.E.Stuntz (1974)

= Ramaria magnipes =

Species of fungus

Ramaria magnipes is a coral fungus in the family Gomphaceae. It is found in western North America, where it fruits on the ground in mixed forests.

== Taxonomy ==
The species was described as new to science in 1974 by Currie Marr and Daniel E. Stuntz in their monograph of Ramaria species of western Washington. The type collection was made near Merritt, Chelan County, Washington in 1967. The variety albidior was described by Ronald H. Petersen in 1988.

== Description ==
The coral-shaped fruit bodies are relatively large, with dimensions of 9–25 cm (3 1/2–9 7/8 in) by 14–24 cm (5 1/2–9 1/2 in). The large stipe, which roots into the soil, is tapered to conical, measuring 7–14 cm (2 3/4–5 1/2 in) long by 4–6 cm (1 5/8–2 3/8 in) thick; it stains brown in age. The color of fresh fruit bodies ranges from light yellow to brownish pale orange (with white flesh), while dried specimens tend to be paler, from pale yellow to grayish orange (with pale yellow flesh); the flesh has a slow and mild amyloid reaction. The branches are compact (giving the fruit body a cauliflower-like appearance), with about six branches from the base. The primary branches are thick, up to 3 cm (1 1/8 in) in diameter, while the secondary branches are usually in the range of 0.2–1 cm (1/8–3/8 in) in diameter. Its flesh has a weakly aromatic or fabaceous (bean-like) odor, and a weakly fabaceous or bitter taste.

The dimensions of the spores is in the range of 10–14 by 3–4.5 μm (averaging 11.8–3.7 μm). They are cylindrical, and smooth or with very fine cyanophilous (stainable with blue dyes) warts. The basidia (spore-bearing cells) are club-shaped, two- or four-spored with sterigmata up to 14 μm long, and measure 47–80 by 8–11 μm.

The variety albidior differs from the main type by having white to yellowish branches. Its spores are somewhat cylindrical to narrowly ellipsoid, and range in size from 10.8–11.9 by 3.6–4.3 μm.

Ramaria obtusissima is somewhat similar in appearance. It can be distinguished from R. magnipes by its smaller size, less intense fruit body color, and its shorter spores (9.5–11.5 by 3.5–4.0 μm). R. highlandensis has larger spores (with an average length of 12.4 μm), a smaller stipe, and an aromatic odor. Found in Macon County, North Carolina, it fruits in the summer.

== Habitat and distribution ==
The fungus fruits on the ground in mixed forests. It has been collected from the US states of Idaho, Washington, and Tennessee. Variety albidior is found in the Sierra Nevada mountains of California, where it fruits in the spring. Ramaria magnipes is a snowbank fungus, meaning it is often found around the edge of melting snowbanks, or shortly after snowmelt.

== Edibility ==
The species is edible, best eaten young and cooked, and may have a laxative effect.
