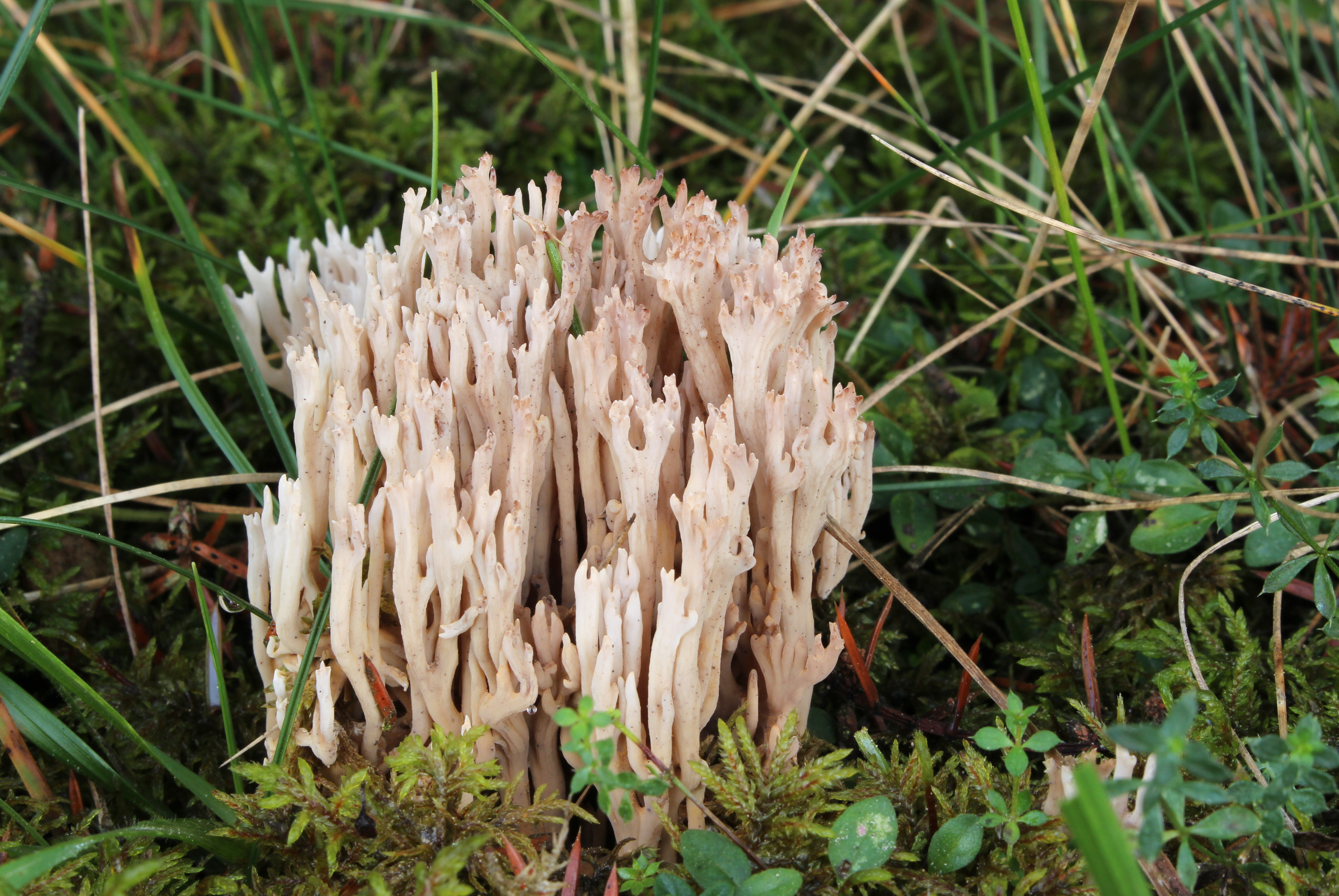

Conservation status
- Apparently Secure (NatureServe)

Scientific classification
- Kingdom: Fungi
- Division: Basidiomycota
- Class: Agaricomycetes
- Order: Gomphales
- Family: Gomphaceae
- Genus: Ramaria
- Species: R. gracilis

Binomial name
- Ramaria gracilis (Pers.) Quél. (1888)

Synonyms
- Clavaria gracilis Pers. (1797)

= Ramaria gracilis =

Species of fungus

Ramaria gracilis is a species of coral fungus in the family Gomphaceae.

== Taxonomy ==
The species was originally described in Christiaan Hendrik Persoon's 1797 Commentatio de Fungis Clavaeformibus as Clavaria gracilis. It was subsequently reclassified by Kurt Polycarp Joachim Sprengel as Merisma gracile in 1826, by William Nylander as Ramalina gracilis in 1860, by Petter Adolf Karsten as Clavariella gracilis in 1881. It was then described as Ramaria gracilis in Lucien Quélet's 1888 Flore mycologique de la France et des pays limitrophes, and this name was sanctioned by Elias Magnus Fries. The subsequently described Clavaria fragrantissima (G.F. Atk., 1908) is now considered a synonym. Within Ramaria, R. gracilis is a part of the subgenus Lentoramaria.

== Description ==
Ramaria gracilis fruit bodies (basidiocarps), which are made up of a dense cluster of branches, measure up to 8 centimetres (3.1 in) in height and 4 centimetres (1.6 in) in width. The individual branches, which have fairly thin bases, are typically forked and sometimes entangled with one another. In colour, the basidiocarps vary from a pale brown to white to pink-beige. The smell of anise can be used to distinguish the species from the otherwise similar Ramariopsis kunzei and Clavulina cristata.

Ramaria gracilis produces spores which measure from 5 to 7 by 3 to 4.5 micrometres (μm). The spores are elliptic with small warts which can be thin enough to look like spines. They vary in colour from yellow to brown. The cylindrical to club-shaped basidia measure from 25 to 45 by 5 to 7 μm. The hyphae are from 2 to 10 μm thick.

== Distribution and habitat ==
Ramaria gracilis is found in European coniferous woodland, where it grows on leaf litter. It has an uneven distribution, and is very rare. Basidiocarps are most often encountered between August and December. R. gracilis has been reported in Australia, but a 2014 study suggests that such reports were likely misidentifications of R. filicicola.
