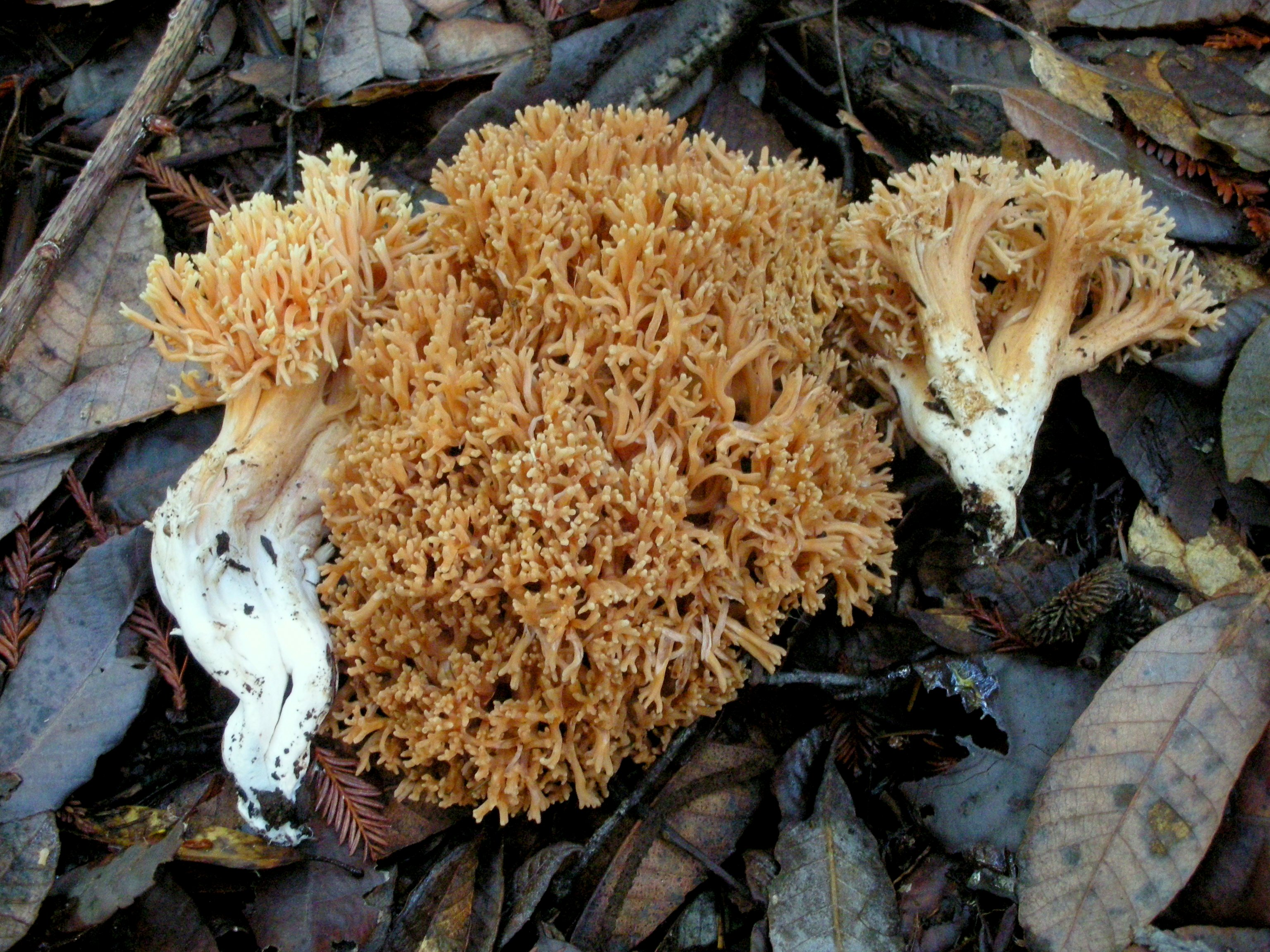

Scientific classification
- Kingdom: Fungi
- Division: Basidiomycota
- Class: Agaricomycetes
- Order: Gomphales
- Family: Gomphaceae
- Genus: Ramaria
- Species: R. gelatinosa

Binomial name
- Ramaria gelatinosa Holmsk. (1790)

= Ramaria gelatinosa =

Species of fungus

Ramaria gelatinosa
- Mycological characteristics
- Smooth hymenium
- No distinct cap
- Hymenium attachment is irregular or not applicable
- Stipe is bare
- Ecology is mycorrhizal
- Edibility is poisonous

Ramaria gelatinosa, commonly known as the gelatinous coral, is a coral mushroom in the family Gomphaceae. It is found in Europe and North America. The species was first described by Theodor Holmskjold in 1790.

The oregonensis variety, only reported from the Pacific Northwest, has translucent and gelatinous flesh and a yellow band on the top part of the stem. It can be found growing around fallen wood. It differs microscopically from var. gelatinosa. It is reportedly inedible, as are most gelatinous species of the genus for most people, and may be poisonous.

Similar species including R. flavigelatinosa, R. gelatiniaurantia, and R. sandaricina are only mildly gelatinous.
