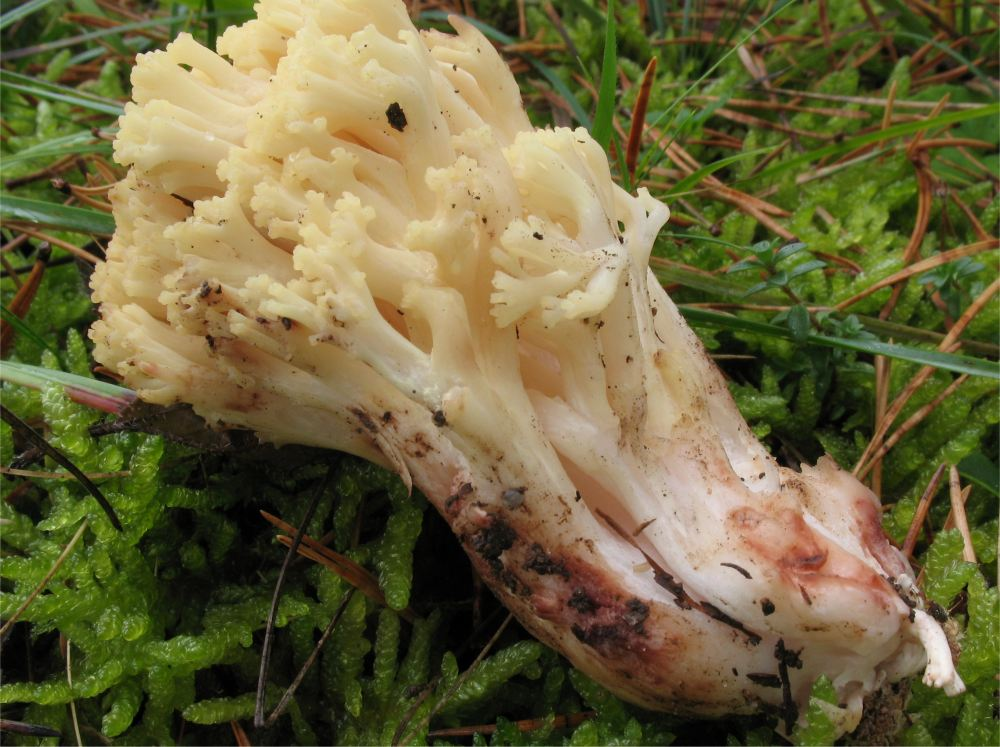

Scientific classification
- Kingdom: Fungi
- Division: Basidiomycota
- Class: Agaricomycetes
- Order: Gomphales
- Family: Gomphaceae
- Genus: Ramaria
- Species: R. sanguinea

Binomial name
- Ramaria sanguinea (Pers.) Quél. (1888)

Synonyms
- Clavaria sanguinea Pers. (1799)

= Ramaria sanguinea =

Species of fungus

Ramaria sanguinea, commonly known as the bleeding coral or the bloody coral, is a coral mushroom in the family Gomphaceae.

== Taxonomy ==
The species was first described by Christian Hendrik Persoon in 1799. It was transferred to the genus Ramaria by Lucien Quélet in 1888.

== Description ==
It grows up to 25 centimetres (10 in) tall and wide. The branches are pale to translucent yellow, with somewhat brighter tips. The stem often stains reddish. The flesh is whitish and tastes mild. The spore print is tannish.

Specimens in western North America may be related species.
