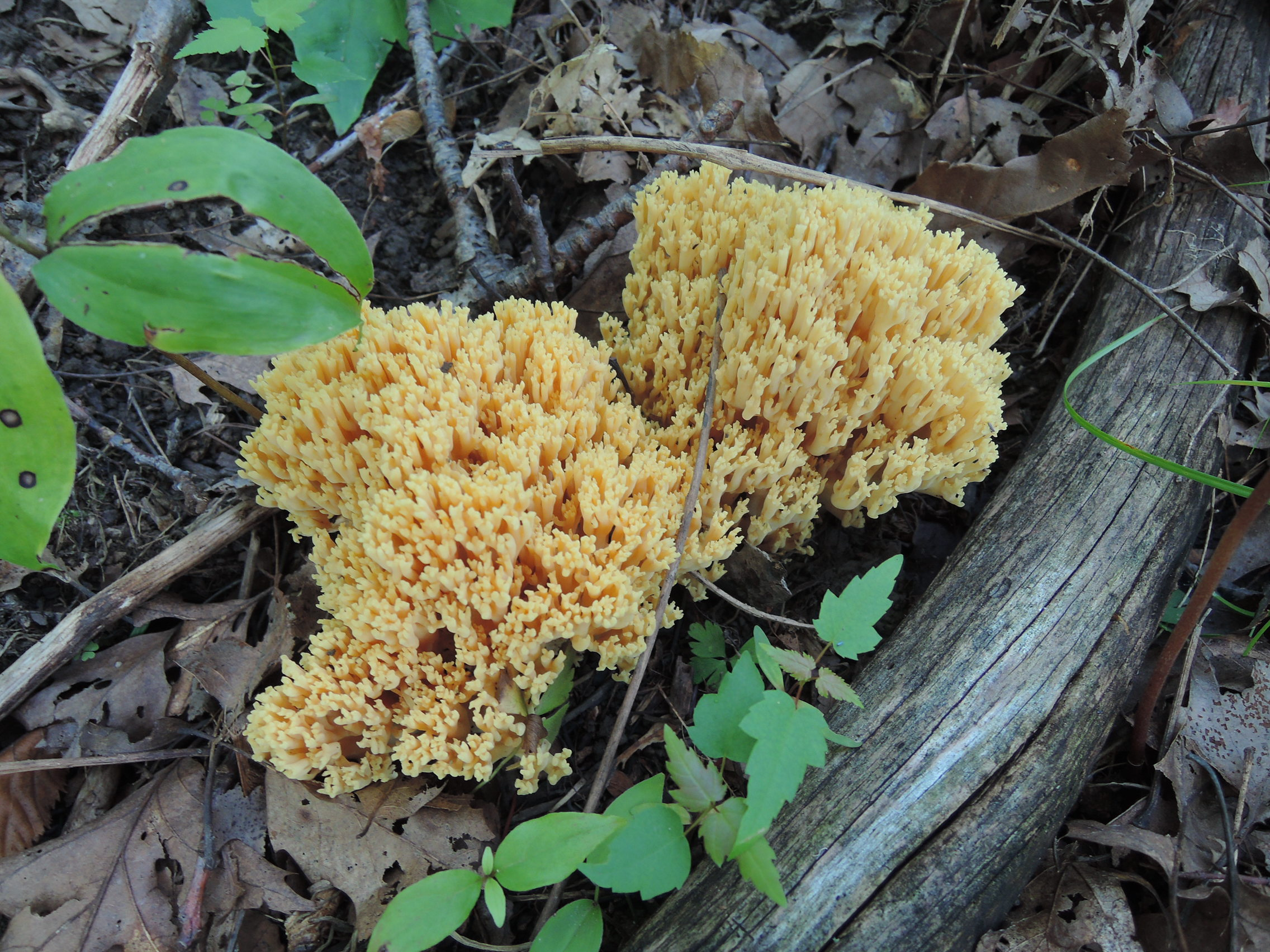

Scientific classification
- Domain: Eukaryota
- Kingdom: Fungi
- Division: Basidiomycota
- Class: Agaricomycetes
- Order: Gomphales
- Family: Gomphaceae
- Genus: Ramaria
- Species: R. decurrens

Binomial name
- Ramaria decurrens (Pers.) R.H. Petersen (1981)

Synonyms
- Clavaria decurrens Pers. (1822)

= Ramaria decurrens =

Species of fungus

Ramaria decurrens, commonly known as the ochre coral, is a coral mushroom in the family Gomphaceae. It is found in Europe and North America.

== Taxonomy ==
The species was originally described under the name Clavaria decurrens by Christian Hendrik Persoon in 1822.
