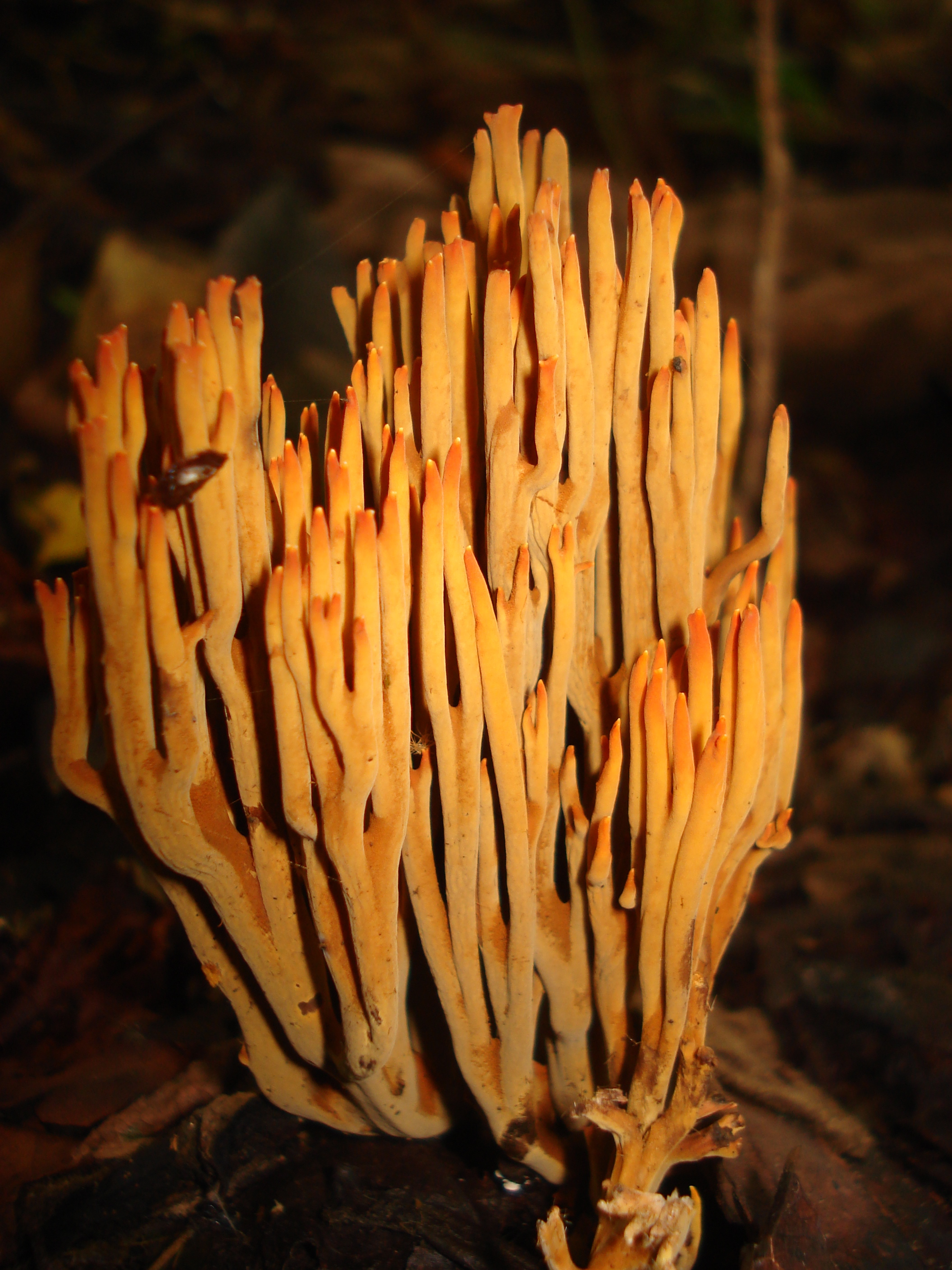
- Found in Veracruz, Mexico

Scientific classification
- Domain: Eukaryota
- Kingdom: Fungi
- Division: Basidiomycota
- Class: Agaricomycetes
- Order: Gomphales
- Family: Gomphaceae
- Genus: Ramaria
- Species: R. cokeri

Binomial name
- Ramaria cokeri R.H. Petersen (1976)

Synonyms
- Phaeoclavulina cokeri (R.H.Petersen) Giachini (2011)

= Ramaria cokeri =

Species of fungus

Ramaria cokeri is a coral mushroom in the family Gomphaceae. It was described in 1976 from the Appalachian Mountains in the United States. Some authors have proposed to place the species in a separate genus Phaeoclavulina based on molecular analyses, but this was explicitly rejected in a subsequent publication due to the resulting morphological variability of the resulting genus.

The species has been reported from Japan, Mexico, Colombia, Malaysia, Indonesia, Sri Lanka, Pakistan, Papua New Guinea, Solomon Islands, and New Zealand. In 2012, it was reported for the first time from the Canary Islands and Guinea.
