= Ramaria strasseri =

Scientific classification
- Domain: Eukaryota
- Kingdom: Fungi
- Division: Basidiomycota
- Class: Agaricomycetes
- Order: Gomphales
- Family: Gomphaceae
- Genus: Ramaria
- Species: R. strasseri

Binomial name
- Ramaria strasseri (Bres.) Corner (1950)

Synonyms
- Clavaria strasseri Bres. (1900)

Species of fungus

Ramaria strasseri is a species of coral fungus in the family Gomphaceae. First described by Giacomo Bresadola in 1900 as Clavaria strasseri, it was transferred to the genus Ramaria in 1950 by E.J.H. Corner.
