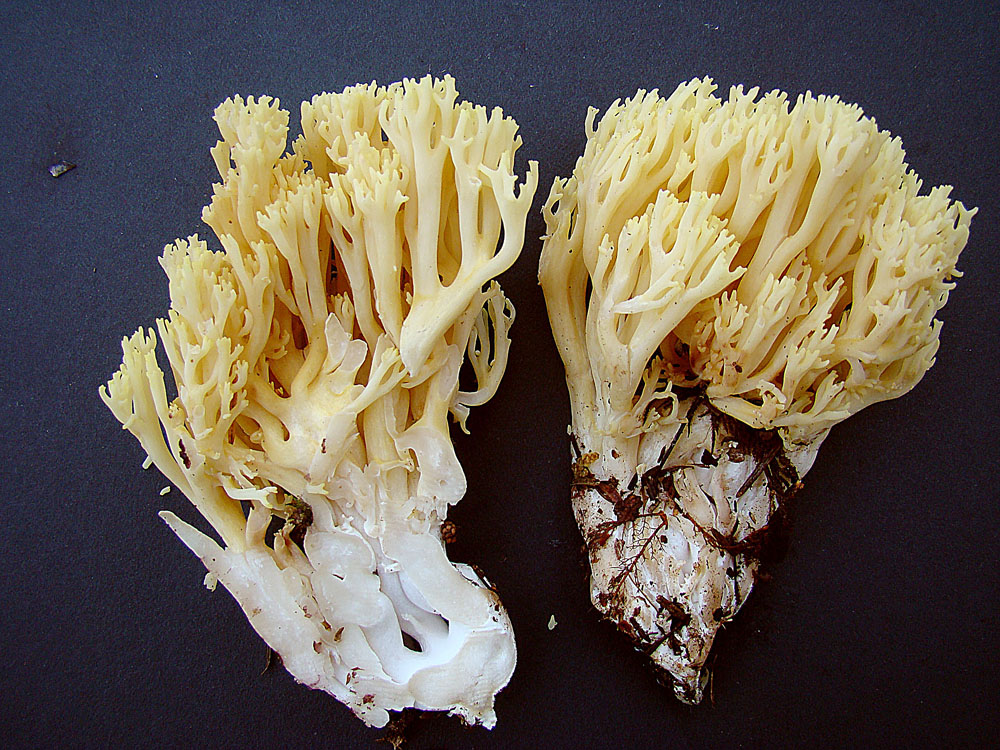

Scientific classification
- Domain: Eukaryota
- Kingdom: Fungi
- Division: Basidiomycota
- Class: Agaricomycetes
- Order: Gomphales
- Family: Gomphaceae
- Genus: Ramaria
- Species: R. cystidiophora

Binomial name
- Ramaria cystidiophora (Kauffman) Corner (1950)

Synonyms
- Clavaria cystidiophora Kauffman (1928)

= Ramaria cystidiophora =

Species of fungus

Ramaria cystidiophora, commonly known as the fuzzy-footed coral, is a coral mushroom in the family Gomphaceae. It is in the Laeticolora subgenus of Ramaria. The branches are yellow, sometimes brighter at the tips, growing from a fuzzy white stem. The odour is sweet.

While the species is relatively unlikely to be confused with another, several varieties exist – for instance var. anisata, which is of a peach hue.

== Taxonomy ==
The species was first described as Clavaria cystidiophora by Calvin Henry Kauffman in 1928. E.J.H. Corner transferred it to the genus Ramaria in 1950.
