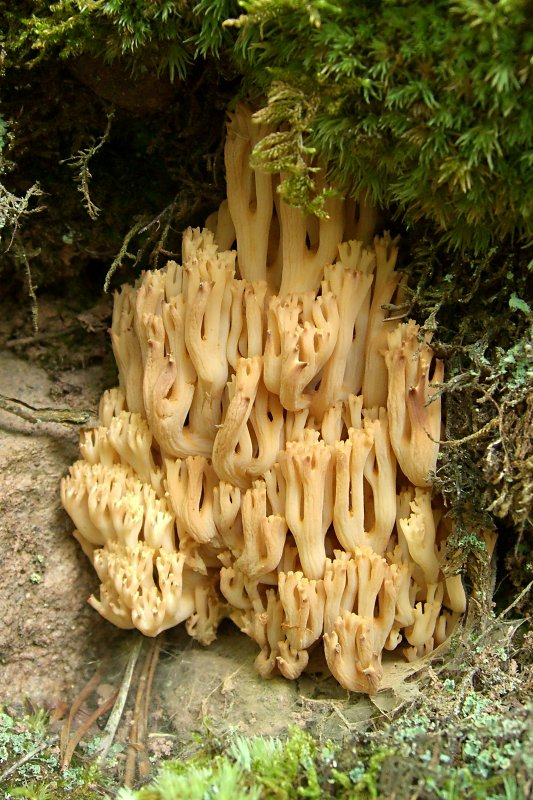

Scientific classification
- Kingdom: Fungi
- Division: Basidiomycota
- Class: Agaricomycetes
- Order: Gomphales
- Family: Gomphaceae
- Genus: Ramaria
- Species: R. caulifloriformis

Binomial name
- Ramaria caulifloriformis (Leathers) Corner (1970)

Synonyms
- Clavaria caulifloriformis Leathers (1956)

= Ramaria caulifloriformis =

Species of fungus

Ramaria caulifloriformis is a species of coral fungus in the family Gomphaceae. It was first described in 1956 as Clavaria caulifloriformis by Chester Leathers from collections made near Topinabee, Michigan. It was transferred into the genus Ramara in 1970 by E.J.H. Corner. The creamy-brown fruit bodies measure 5–15 cm (2.0–5.9 in) tall by 3–15 cm (1.2–5.9 in) wide, and have a cauliflower head-like appearance (for which the species is named). Spores are ellipsoid, verrucose (covered with warts or wartlike projections), and measure 8–10 by 4–5 μm.
