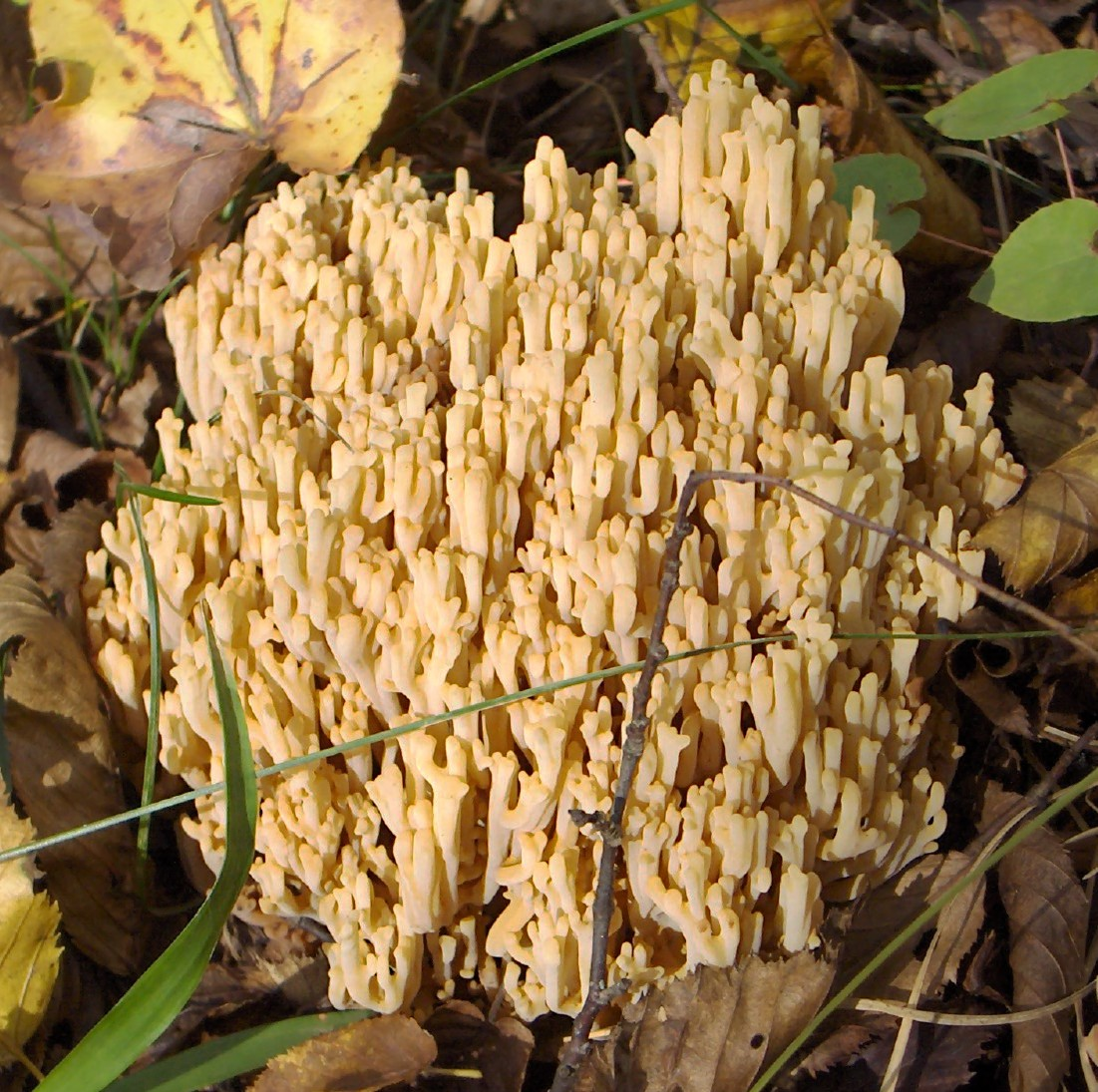

Scientific classification
- Domain: Eukaryota
- Kingdom: Fungi
- Division: Basidiomycota
- Class: Agaricomycetes
- Order: Gomphales
- Family: Gomphaceae
- Genus: Ramaria
- Species: R. pallida

Binomial name
- Ramaria pallida (Schaeff.) Ricken 1920

Synonyms
- Clavaria pallida Schaeff., 1774; Clavaria stricta Schumach., 1803; Ramaria mairei Donk, 1933

= Ramaria pallida =

Species of fungus

Ramaria pallida is a coral mushroom in the family Gomphaceae. It is found in North America.
