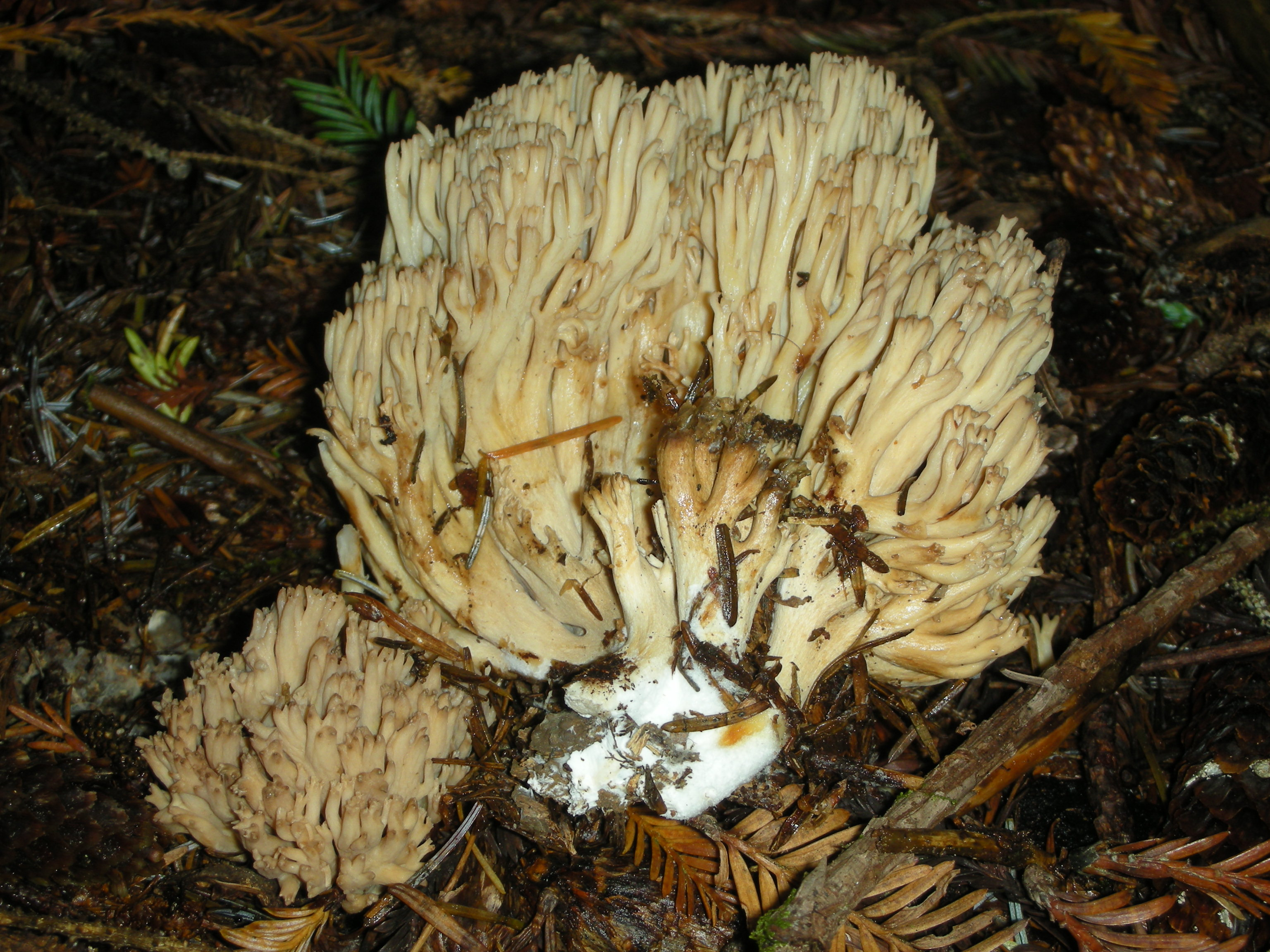

Scientific classification
- Kingdom: Fungi
- Division: Basidiomycota
- Class: Agaricomycetes
- Order: Gomphales
- Family: Gomphaceae
- Genus: Ramaria
- Species: R. acrisiccescens

Binomial name
- Ramaria acrisiccescens Marr & D.E.Stuntz (1974)

= Ramaria acrisiccescens =

Species of fungus

Ramaria acrisiccescens, commonly known as the blah coral, is a coral fungus in the family Gomphaceae. It is found in the forests of northwestern North America.

== Taxonomy ==
The species was first described scientifically by mycologists Currie Marr and Daniel Stuntz in their 1974 monograph, "Ramaria of western Washington". The holotype was collected in 1966 about 5 miles (8.0 km) south of Elbe, Washington. It is classified in the subgenus Laeticolora. It is commonly known as the "blah coral".

== Description ==
The whitish fruit bodies are large, generally taller than wide, measuring 5–29 cm (2–11 3/8 in) tall by 1.5–18 cm (5/8–7 1/8 in) wide. The stipe, which is often deeply buried, is slender and tapered, measuring 1.5–9 cm (5/8–3 1/2 in) by 1–3 cm (3/8–1 1/8 in) wide. Fruit bodies consist of elongated branches with roughly parallel arrangements. Each branch itself branches up to 9 times in a dichotomous fashion; each of these branches is slender, typically 1–12 mm in diameter. The branch tips are usually rounded. The context has a fleshy or fibrous consistency, but it becomes brittle and chalky when dry; it sometimes has pinkish or brownish tones in age, and does not react to iron sulfate or Melzer's reagent. The stipe of young fruit bodies is white, while the branches range from shades of grey, to beige, and even orange. The spores have pale yellow and cream colors. The lower branches tend to bruise a brownish color. The color of the branch tips varies, ranging from more or less the same color as the branch, to pallid, or, especially in young specimens, infused with pinkish or purple tones in a small spotted transition.

The spore print is grayish-yellow. Spores are somewhat cylindrical to roughly elliptical, ornamented with lobed warts, and measure about 10.1 by 4.9 μm. The basidia (spore-bearing cells) are club-shaped, one- to four-spored (although most have four), and measure 40–90 by 7–13 μm. The species lacks basal clamps.

== Habitat and distribution ==
Fruit bodies of Ramaria acrisiccescens grow on the ground under western hemlock, typically in mixed forests. It has been recorded from Washington and California.

== Similar species ==
Ramaria velocimutans is similar, but has a brownish hyphae on the stipe and a brownish band within.
