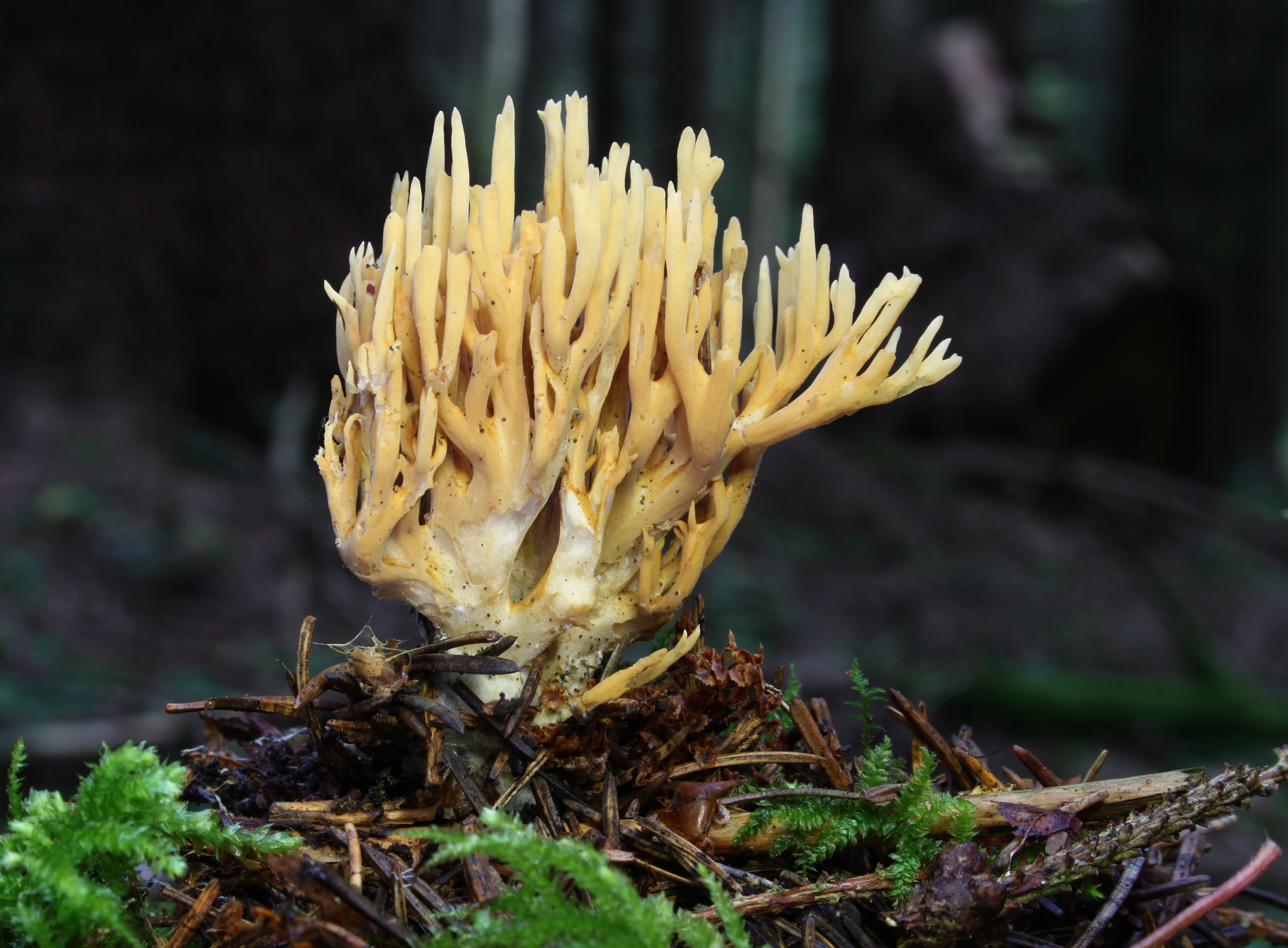

Scientific classification
- Kingdom: Fungi
- Division: Basidiomycota
- Class: Agaricomycetes
- Order: Gomphales
- Family: Gomphaceae
- Genus: Ramaria
- Species: R. flaccida

Binomial name
- Ramaria flaccida (Fr.) Bourdot (1898)

Synonyms
- Clavaria flaccida Fr. (1821); Clavariella flaccida (Fr.) P.Karst. (1881); Phaeoclavulina flaccida (Fr.) Giachini (2011)

= Ramaria flaccida =

Species of fungus

Ramaria flaccida is a species of coral fungus in the family Gomphaceae. Originally described as Clavaria flaccida by Elias Fries in 1821, the species was transferred to Ramaria by Hubert Bourdot in 1898.
