= Ramaria conjunctipes =

Scientific classification
- Domain: Eukaryota
- Kingdom: Fungi
- Division: Basidiomycota
- Class: Agaricomycetes
- Order: Gomphales
- Family: Gomphaceae
- Genus: Ramaria
- Species: R. conjunctipes

Binomial name
- Ramaria conjunctipes (Coker) Corner (1950)

Synonyms
- Clavaria conjunctipes Coker (1923)

Species of fungus

Ramaria conjunctipes is a coral mushroom in the family Gomphaceae. It is found in North America and Thailand.
