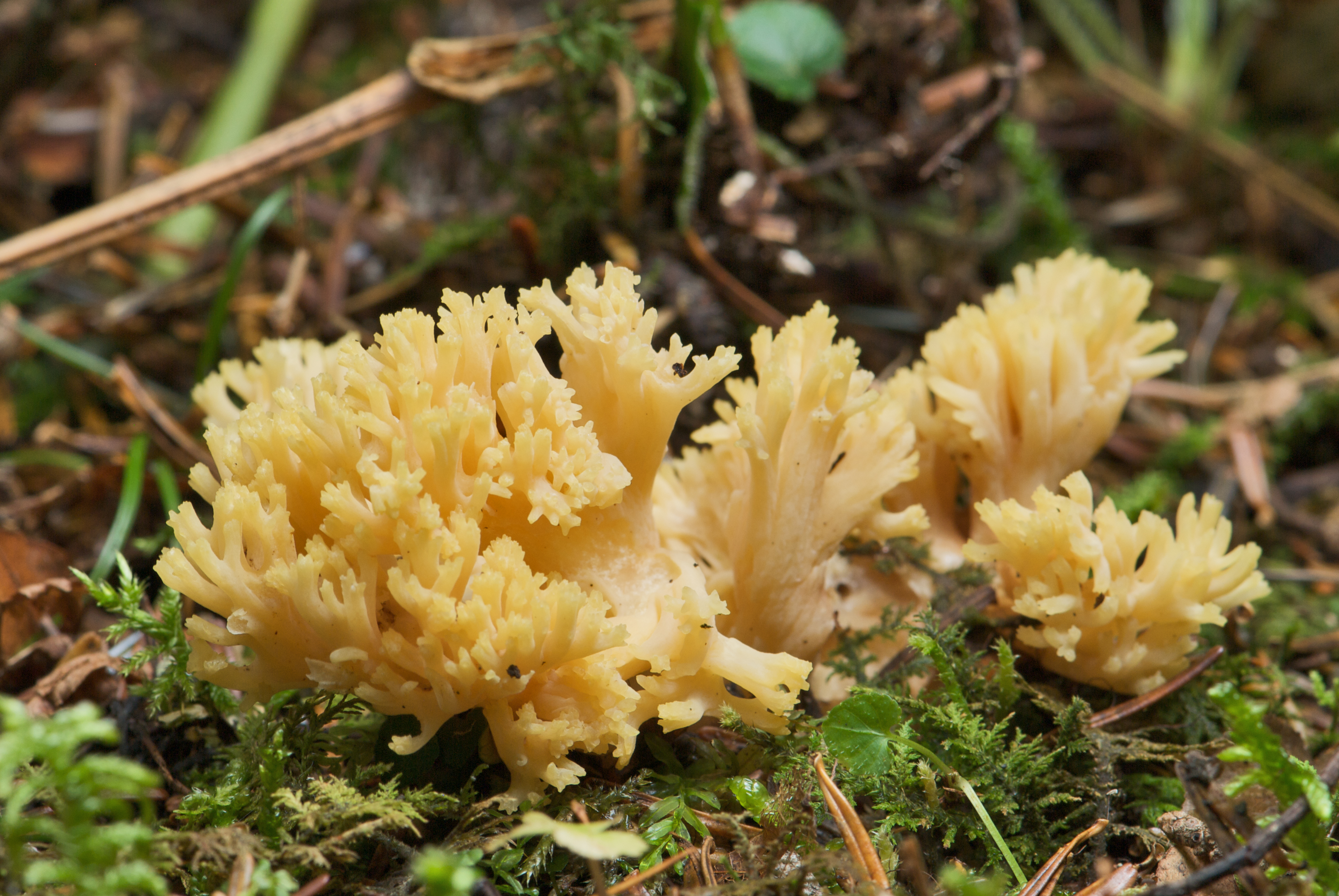

Scientific classification
- Kingdom: Fungi
- Division: Basidiomycota
- Class: Agaricomycetes
- Order: Gomphales
- Family: Gomphaceae
- Genus: Ramaria
- Species: R. flava

Binomial name
- Ramaria flava (Schaeff.) Quél. (1888)

Synonyms
- Coralloides flavus Tourn. ex Battarra (1755); Clavaria flava Schaeff. (1774); Corallium flavum (Schaeff.) G.Hahn (1883)

= Ramaria flava =

Species of fungus

Ramaria flava, is a yellow coral mushroom found in Europe. Also known by its local name changle it is also native to temperate areas of southern Chile and south of Brazil (state of Rio Grande do Sul).
