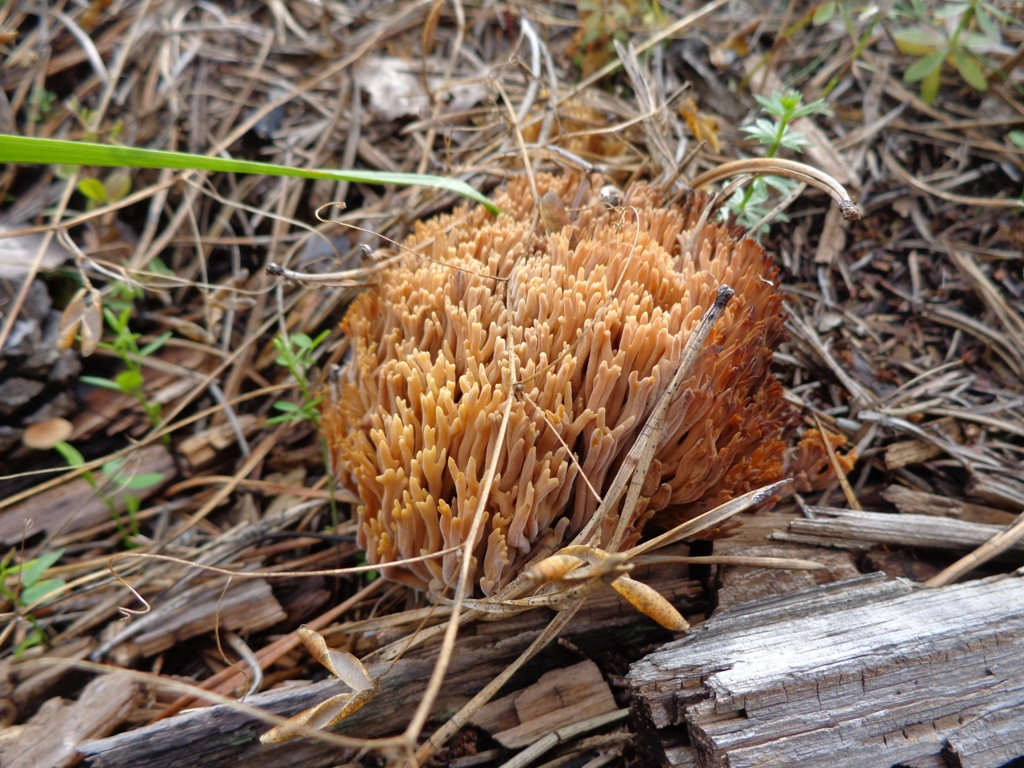

Scientific classification
- Domain: Eukaryota
- Kingdom: Fungi
- Division: Basidiomycota
- Class: Agaricomycetes
- Order: Gomphales
- Family: Gomphaceae
- Genus: Ramaria
- Species: R. flavescens

Binomial name
- Ramaria flavescens (Schaeff.) R.H. Petersen (1974)

Synonyms
- Clavaria flavescens Schaeff. (1762)

= Ramaria flavescens =

Species of fungus

Ramaria flavescens is a species of coral fungus in the family Gomphaceae. It was first described as Clavaria flavescens by Jacob Christian Schäffer in 1762; American mycologist Ron Peterson transferred it to the genus Ramaria in 1974. The IUCN Red List labels this species as Critically Endangered in Denmark and as Data Deficient in the Czech Republic.
