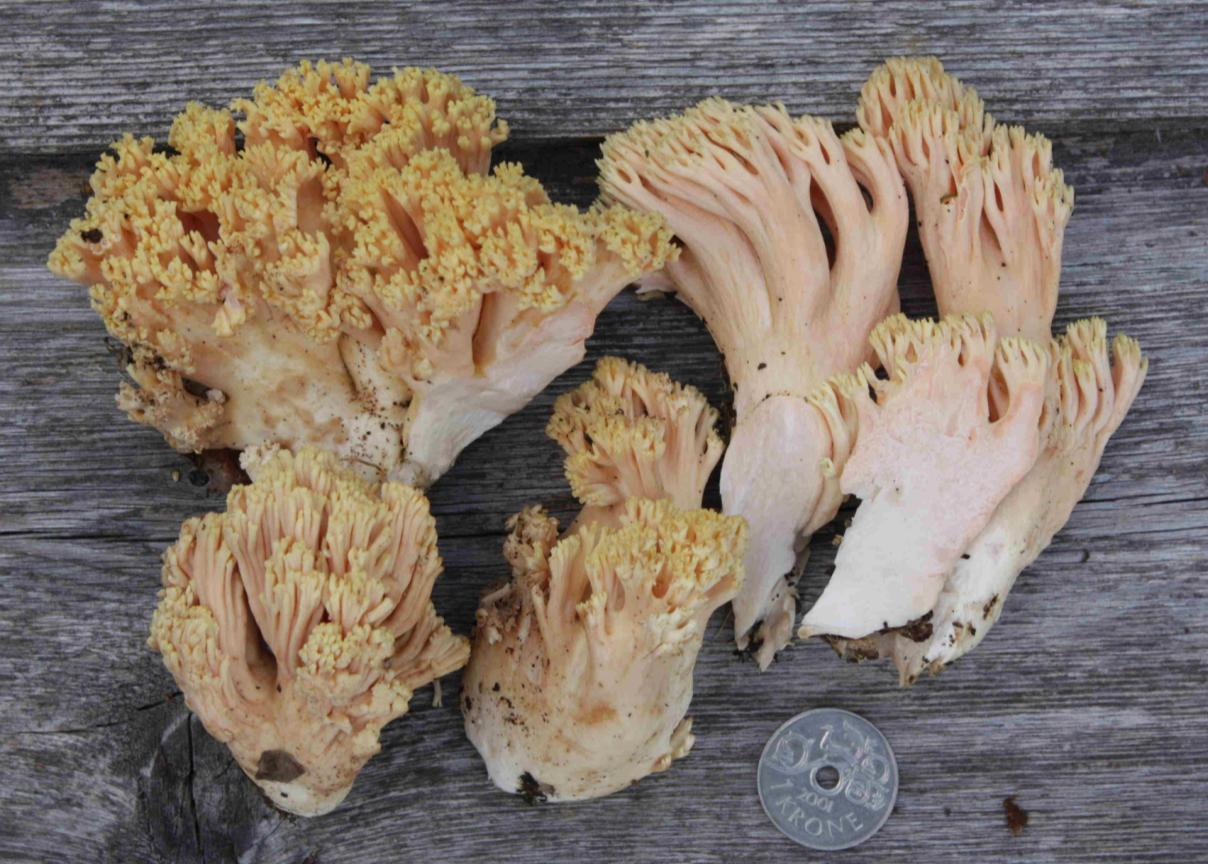

Scientific classification
- Domain: Eukaryota
- Kingdom: Fungi
- Division: Basidiomycota
- Class: Agaricomycetes
- Order: Gomphales
- Family: Gomphaceae
- Genus: Ramaria
- Species: R. formosa

Binomial name
- Ramaria formosa (Pers.) Quél. (1888)

Synonyms
- Clavaria formosa Pers. (1797); Merisma formosum (Pers.) Lenz (1831); Clavaria formosa Krombh. (1841); Corallium formosum (Pers.) G.Hahn (1883)

= Ramaria formosa =

Ramaria formosa Mycological characteristics
- Smooth hymenium
- No distinct cap
- Hymenium attachment is irregular or not applicable
- Stipe is bare
- Spore print is yellow
- Ecology is mycorrhizal
- Edibility is poisonous

Ramaria formosa, commonly known as the pinkish coral mushroom, salmon coral, beautiful clavaria, handsome clavaria, yellow-tipped- or pink coral fungus, is a coral fungus found in Europe.

It is a pinkish, much-branched coral-shape reaching some 20 cm (8 in) high. It is widely held to be mildly poisonous if consumed, giving rise to acute gastrointestinal symptoms of nausea, vomiting, diarrhea and colicky pain.

== Taxonomy ==
The fungus was initially described by Christian Hendrik Persoon in 1797 as Clavaria formosa. In 1821, Elias Magnus Fries sanctioned the genus name Clavaria, and treated Ramaria as a section of Clavaria. It was placed in its current genus by French mycologist Lucien Quélet in 1888. Synonyms have resulted from transfers of the fungus to the now obsolete genera Merisma by Harald Othmar Lenz in 1831, and to Corallium by Gotthold Hahn in 1883.

The generic name is derived from Latin rāmus 'branch', while the specific epithet comes from the Latin formōsus 'beautiful'. Common names include salmon coral, beautiful clavaria, handsome clavaria, yellow-tipped- or pink coral fungus. There is some confusion over its classification as there is evidence the binomial name has been applied loosely to any coral fungus fitting the description, and thus the collections from North America are now considered to be a different species.

== Description ==
The fruit body grows to a height of 30 cm (12 in) and width of 15 cm (6 in); it is a many-branched coral-like structure, the yellow-tipped pinkish branches arising from a thick base. The terminal branches are less than 0.5 cm (1/4 in) in diameter. The flesh is white, with pink in the middle, or pale orange. It may turn wine-coloured or blackish when bruised. Old specimens fade so the original colour is hard to distinguish. The smell is unpleasant and taste bitter.

The spores have a cylindrical to elliptical shape and measure 8–15 by 4–6 μm. The spore surface features small warts that are arranged in confluent lines. The basidia (spore-bearing cells) are club-shaped, measuring 40–60 by 7–10 μm Clamp connections are present in the hyphae.

=== Similar species ===
There are several other Ramaria species with yellow-tipped, salmon-coloured branches, including R. leptoformosa, R. neoformosa, R. raveneliana and R. rubricarnata. These are distinguished from R. formosa most reliably using microscopic characteristics. One guide recommends that all old coral fungi should be avoided for consumption.

== Distribution and habitat ==
Fruiting in autumn, Ramaria formosa is associated with beech and is found in Europe. In Cyprus, the fungus is thought to form mycorrhizal associations with golden oak (Quercus alnifolia).

Similar forms collected in North America are considered to represent a different species.

== Toxicity ==
Consumption of the fungus results in acute gastrointestinal symptoms of nausea, vomiting, colicky abdominal pain and diarrhea. The toxins responsible are unknown to date. It has been reported as edible if the acrid tips are removed.
