= Sanctioned name =

Type of name in mycology

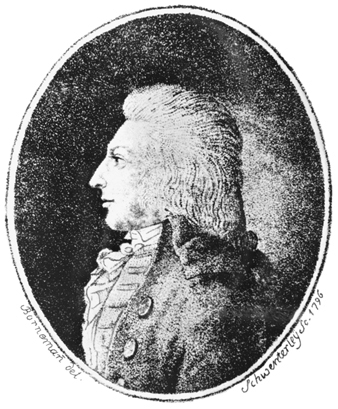

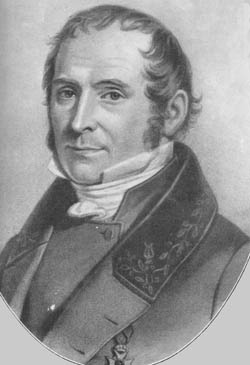
Early works by Persoon (above) and Fries (below) are the starting points of fungal taxonomy.

In mycology, a sanctioned name is a name that was adopted (but not necessarily coined) in certain works of Christiaan Hendrik Persoon or Elias Magnus Fries, which are considered major points in fungal taxonomy.

== Definition and effects ==
Sanctioned names are those, regardless of their authorship, that were used by Persoon in his Synopsis Methodica Fungorum (1801) for rusts, smuts and gasteromycetes, and in Fries's Systema Mycologicum (three volumes, published 1821–1832) and Elenchus fungorum for all other fungi.

A sanctioned name, as defined under article 15 of the International Code of Nomenclature for algae, fungi, and plants (previously, the International Code of Botanical Nomenclature) is automatically treated as if conserved against all earlier synonyms or homonyms. It can still, however, be conserved or rejected normally.

== History ==
Because of the imprecision associated with assigning starting dates for fungi sanctioned in Fries' three Systema volumes, the Stockholm 1950 International Botanical Congress defined arbitrary or actual publication dates for the starting points to improve the stability of nomenclature. These dates were 1 May 1753 for Species Plantarum (vascular plants), 31 December 1801 for Synopsis Methodica Fungorum, 31 December 1820 for Flora der Vorweldt (fossil plants), and 1 January 1821 for the first volume of Systema. Because fungi defined in the second and third volumes lacked a starting-point book for reference, the Congress declared that these species, in addition to species defined in Fries' 1828 Elenchus Fungorum (a two-volume supplement to his System), had "privileged status". According to Korf, the term "sanctioned" was first used to indicate these privileged names by the Dutch mycologist Marinus Anton Donk in 1961.

In 1982, changes in the International Code for Botanical Nomenclature (the Sydney Code) restored Linnaeus' 1753 Species Plantarum as the starting point for fungal nomenclature; however, protected status was given to all names adopted by Persoon in his 1801 Synopsis, and by Fries in both the Systema and the Elenchus. Soon after, in 1983, Richard P. Korf proposed the now widely accepted "colon-author indication", whereby sanctioned names are indicated by including ": Pers." or ": Fr." when fully citing the species author. Formal approval of this convention was abolished in the 2018 revision to the Fungi chapter of the code.
