= Adalbert Ricken =

German Roman Catholic priest and mycologist

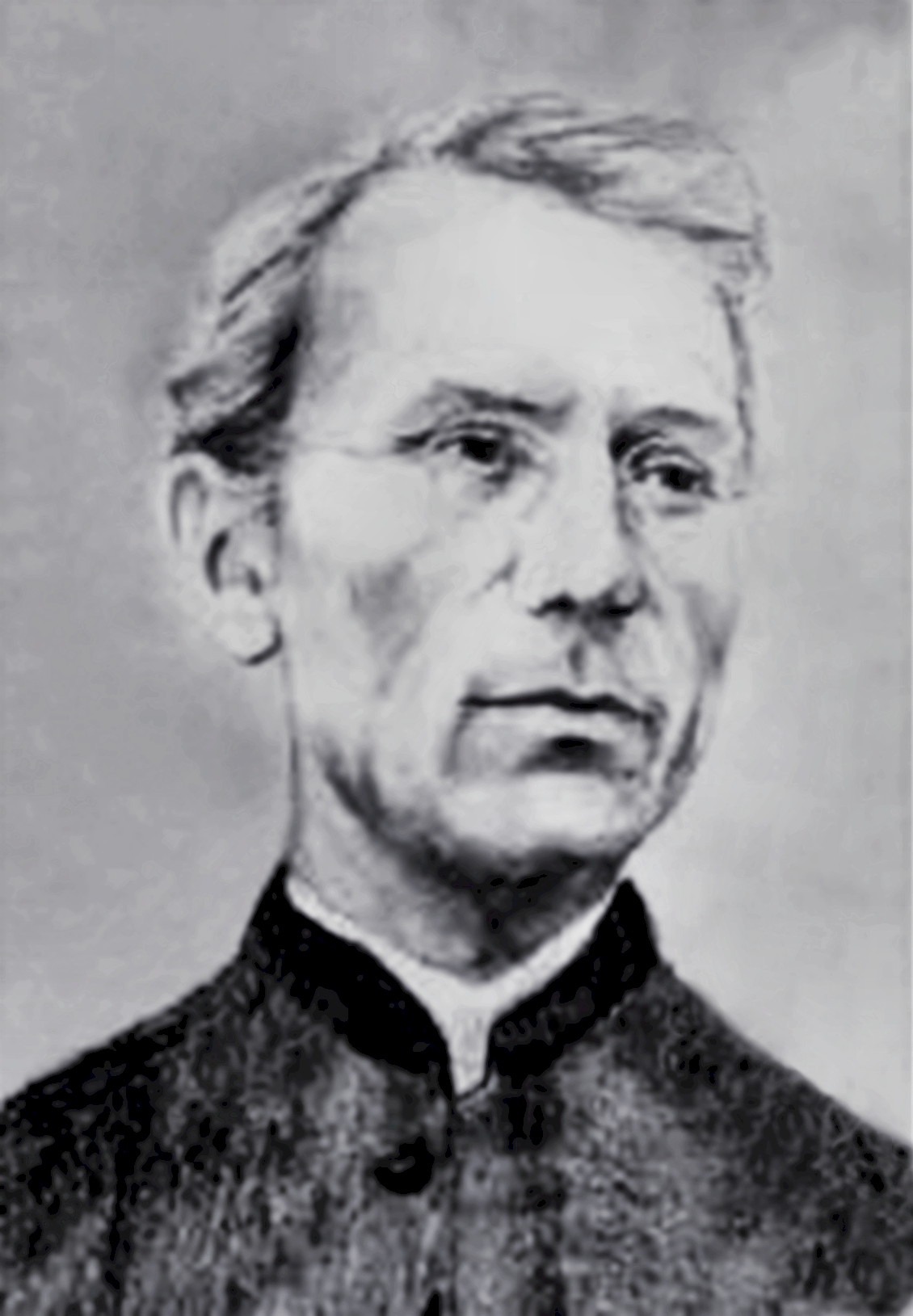
Adalbert Ricken

Adalbert Ricken (18 March 1851 – 1 March 1921) was a German Roman Catholic priest and mycologist born in Fulda.

He attended the seminary for Roman Catholic priests in Fulda, and afterwards was a priest and chaplain at several locations in the Fulda diocese.

He made contributions in the classification of fungi, and was the author of a popular textbook on mushrooms called Vademecum für Pilzfreunde (Digital edition by the University and State Library Düsseldorf). Another noted work by Ricken was Die Blätterpilze (Agaricaceae) Deutschlands und der angrenzenden Länder, besonders Oesterreichs und der Schweiz (1915), a publication on fungi from the family Agaricaceae that are native to central Europe.

The genus Rickenella from the family Repetobasidiaceae is named in his honor. Since 1987, the "Adalbert Ricken Preis" is awarded by the Deutsche Gesellschaft für Mykologie for research done by young amateur mycologists.
