= Daniel Elliot Stuntz =

American mycologist

Daniel Elliot Stuntz (March 15, 1909 - March 5, 1983) was an American mycologist.

== Education ==
Stuntz was born in Milford, Ohio, United States. Before he went to college, he studied in Queen Anne High School, Seattle. In autumn 1931, he enrolled at the University of Washington and received his Bachelor of Science degree in 1935. Stuntz began his undergraduate study as a forestry major. After taking a general mycology course offered by J. W. Hotson in the botany department, he developed an interest in fungi. Hence, he decided to change his major to Botany.

After he finished his bachelor's degree study, he began his master's degree with Dr. Hotson while working on Inocybe (Stuntz and Hotson 1938). He did not finish his master's degree; instead, he went to Yale University for his doctoral degree. His transfer was encouraged by Professor T. C. Frye, who viewed Stuntz as a potential replacement of Dr. Hotson, whose health was becoming problematic. Amazingly, John S. Boyce accepted Stuntz as a student and allowed him to continue to do Inocybe research, which is not Dr. Boyce's expertise. Stunz finished his doctoral degree at Yale in 1940.

== Career ==
The earliest record of Stuntz's research activities can be traced back to March 30, 1934, when he was a junior in college. By that time, he began to collect, photograph and describe agarics as well as other fungi. Later, Stuntz was influenced by Dr. Hotson to begin working on the agaric taxonomy. In addition, Alexander H. Smith was another person who had a great impact on Daniel's choice of profession. They met each other on the Olympic Mountains during collections and after that, they began a long friendship. Alex kept encouraging Stuntz to continue his work on Inocybe and other agaric genera, which laid the fundamental basis for Stuntz's taxonomy works in the future. Stuntz kept working on Inocybe during his master's and doctoral degree.

In 1940, after he finished his doctoral degree from Yale, he was hired as an instructor at the University of Washington. He retained this title until 1945 when he was promoted as an assistant professor and, later, in 1950 he became an associate professor. In 1958, he became a professor in the botany department and kept this title until he retired. At the beginning of his professional journey as a fungal taxonomist, he collected almost every agaric he could find. Later, due to teaching commitments, his collection was mainly limited to Pluteus, Hebeloma and Inocybe. Eventually, he spent all his efforts concentrating on Inocybe classification.

During his teaching process, Stuntz would collect almost every group of fungi he could find and try to identify it. He would write his own keys to his collections and a few of them were eventually published. One of his important publications was a book named How to identify mushrooms to Genus IV: keys to families and Genera, published in 1977 (Stuntz 1977). During his last several years, he developed an interest in the resupinate, nonporoid Aphyllophorales and enrolled several students working on those (Libonati-Barnes 1981). Throughout his professional career, he had served as mentor for 39 graduate students and published 40 papers.

== Contributions ==
Stuntz had a wide interest in the fungi collection and identification. His personal collection number had over 20,000 specimens. Besides his personal interest and collections, he also developed an excellent fungal herbarium at the University of Washington, in which most of the materials were identified to genus and species. Some of the specimens were exchanged from other sources and this directly led to the wide diversity of fungal group collection of the herbarium though Stuntz was mainly focused on certain group studies.

Stuntz was a talented linguist, which offered him the potentiality to be a bibliophile of the first order. Benefiting from different literature resources such as University of Washington Libraries, Yale University Library, and Michigan mycological library, he deeply understood the importance of an extensive library to researchers, and decided to put both money and time into building a mycological library, which was later called the superb mycological library in the University of Washington. Stuntz purchased all the library items using his own money and many of them were fairly expensive relative to Stuntz's salary. Among the approximately 1300 books in his mycological library were also expensive and rare volumes. After he died, he donated his book collections to both the Department of Botany and Suzzallo Library. According to his intention, these books and papers are available to researchers and others (Ammirati and Libonati-Barnes 1986).

One of the most noticeable gifts of Stuntz was his teaching ability. He could efficiently deliver the scientific information to a wide variety of people: from the mycological researchers to the amateurs. His lecture was described as well organized, beautifully illustrated, and appropriately-paced. In 1951, His evaluation was ranked fourth among all of the teachers in the University of Washington. In 1974, he received the Alumni Distinguished Teaching Award, which indicated the recognition of him by the public (Information from winners of UW's distinguished teaching awards).

For years, Stuntz was a 'public servant.' Not only did he help with the identification of fungi, but he also spent considerable amount of time giving lectures to amateur mycologists. One of his major contributions to the amateur mycology is that he and the members of Pacific Northwest mushroom societies established the Pacific Northwest Key Council. In addition, Stuntz's most important tribute to the public service is the establishment of the Daniel Elliot Stuntz Memorial foundation by the amateur and professional mycologists in the Pacific Northwest. This foundation is aimed to provide financial support to students pursuing advanced degree in the fungal systematics and to provide financial support for travel expenses of amateur and professional mycologists in the Pacific Northwest. In the past 7 years, the foundation has contributed over $68,000 in grants to support the mycological studies (Information from website of Puget Sound Mycological Society).

== Other personal interests ==
Stuntz had interest not only in science, but also in arts. He played the piano well and had a great love of classic chamber music. However, Stuntz's father did not think the art is a practical field, so the lack of encouragement from his family may have directly led him to give up his musical interest. Besides the love of music, Stuntz also loved outdoor recreations such as hiking. In addition, he played badminton for several years and was known as an excellent player.

== Bibliography ==
- Ammirati, J. F., and S. Libonati-Barnes. 1986. Daniel Elliot Stuntz, 1909–1983. Mycologia, 78: 515–531.
- Libonati-Barnes, S. D. 1981. Systematics of Tectella, Panellus, Hohenbuehelia, and Resupinatus (pleurotoid genera) in the Pacific Northwest. PhD dissertation.
- Stuntz, D. E. 1977. How to identify mushrooms to Genus IV: Keys to Families and Genera. Mad River Pr Inc.
- Stuntz, D. E., and J. W. Hotson. 1938. The genus Agaricus in western Washington. Mycologia, 30: 204–234.
