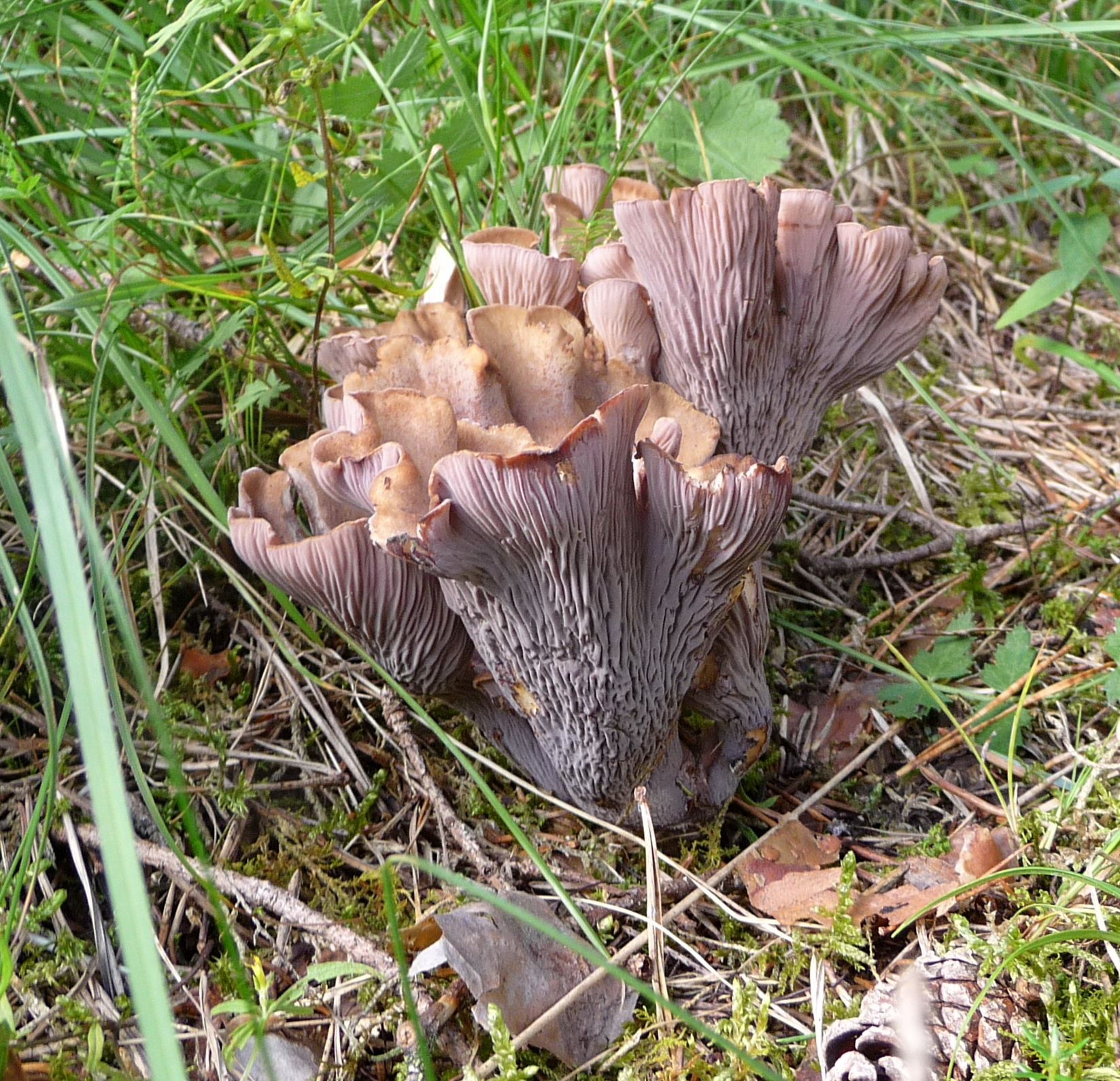

Scientific classification
- Kingdom: Fungi
- Division: Basidiomycota
- Class: Agaricomycetes
- Order: Gomphales
- Family: Gomphaceae
- Genus: Gomphus
- Species: G. clavatus

Binomial name
- Gomphus clavatus (Pers.) Gray (1821)

Synonyms
- List: Helvella purpurascens Schaeff. (1774); Agaricus purpurascens (Schaeff.) Batsch (1783); Merulius clavatus Pers. (1796); Merulius purpurascens (Schaeff.) Pers. (1797); Cantharellus clavatus (Pers.) Fr. (1821); Gomphora clavata (Pers.) Fr. (1825); Craterellus clavatus (Pers.) Fr. (1838); Thelephora clavata (Pers.) P.Kumm. (1871); Neurophyllum clavatum (Pers.) Pat. (1886); Trombetta clavata (Pers.) Kuntze (1891)

= Gomphus clavatus =

Edible species of fungus native to Eurasia and North America

Gomphus clavatus
- Mycological characteristics
- Ridges on hymenium
- Cap is infundibuliform
- Hymenium is decurrent
- Stipe is bare
- Spore print is yellow
- Ecology is mycorrhizal
- Edibility is edible or can cause allergic reactions

Gomphus clavatus, commonly known as pig's ears or the violet chanterelle, is an edible species of fungus in the genus Gomphus. Described by Jacob Christian Schäffer in 1774, G. clavatus has had several name changes and many alternative scientific names, having been classified in the genus Cantharellus (also called chanterelles), though it is not closely related to them. The fruit body is vase- or fan-shaped with wavy edges to its rim, and grows up to 15–16 cm (6–6 1/4 in) wide and 17 cm (6 3/4 in) tall. The upper surface or cap is orangish-brown to lilac, while the lower spore-bearing surface, the hymenium, is covered in wrinkles and ridges rather than gills or pores, and is a distinctive purple color.

Typically found in coniferous forests in Eurasia and North America, G. clavatus is mycorrhizal and associated with various conifers, particularly spruces and firs. It is more common at elevations of greater than 2,000 ft (600 m), in moist, shady areas with plenty of leaf litter. Although widespread, G. clavatus has become rare in many parts of Europe and extinct in the British Isles. It has been placed on the national Red Lists of threatened fungi in 17 different European countries and is one of 33 species proposed for international conservation under the Bern Convention.

== Taxonomy ==
German naturalist Jacob Christian Schäffer described Elvela (subsequently Helvella) purpurascens in 1774. Austrian naturalist Franz Xaver von Wulfen gave it the name Clavaria elveloides in 1781, reporting that it appeared in the fir tree forests around Klagenfurt in August and was common around Hüttenberg. He recorded that poor people ate it, giving it the local name hare's ear. In 1796, mycologist Christian Hendrik Persoon described G. clavatus as Merulius clavatus, noting that it grew in grassy locations in woods. He noted it was the same species that Schäffer had described. The specific epithet—derived from the Latin word clava (club) and meaning "club-shaped"—refers to the shape of young fruit bodies. In his 1801 Synopsis methodica fungorum, Persoon placed Merulius clavatus (recognising two varieties—violaceus and spadiceus) in the section Gomphus within Merulius.

British botanist Samuel Frederick Gray used Persoon's name, transferring the violet chanterelle to the genus Gomphus in 1821. As it was the first named member of the genus it became the type species. The starting date of fungal taxonomy had been set as January 1, 1821, to coincide with the date of the works of Swedish naturalist Elias Magnus Fries, which meant the name required sanction by Fries (indicated in the name by a colon) to be considered valid. Thus the species was written as Gomphus clavatus (Pers.: Fr.) Gray. A 1987 revision of the International Code of Botanical Nomenclature set the starting date at May 1, 1753, the date of publication of the Species Plantarum, by Carl Linnaeus. Hence, the name no longer requires the ratification of Fries' authority. Persoon followed suit in treating Gomphus as a separate genus in his 1825 work Mycologia Europaea. Here he recognized M. clavatus as the same species as Clavaria truncata described by Casimir Christoph Schmidel in 1796, calling the taxon Gomphus truncatus.

Fries himself declined to keep the genus separate, instead classifying Gomphus as a tribus (subgenus) within the genus Cantharellus in his 1821 work Systema Mycologicum, the species becoming Cantharellus clavatus. He recognized four varieties: violaceo-spadiceus, carneus, purpurascens and umbrinus. Swiss mycologist Louis Secretan described three taxa—Merulius clavatus carneus, M. clavatus violaceus and M. clavatus purpurascens—in his 1833 work Mycographie Suisse. Many of his names have been rejected for nomenclatural purposes because Secretan had a narrow species concept, dividing many taxa into multiple species that were not supported by other authorities, and his works did not use binomial nomenclature consistently. Fries revised his classification in his 1838 book Epicrisis Systematis Mycologici seu Synopsis Hymenomycetum, placing it in a series—Deformes—in the genus Craterellus.

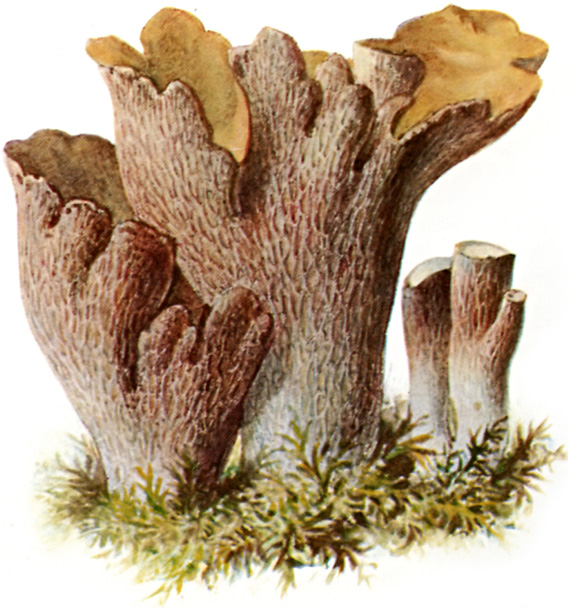
1897 illustration by Albin Schmalfuss

Paul Kummer raised many of Fries' tribus (subgenera; not tribes) to genus rank in his 1871 work Der Führer in die Pilzkunde, classifying the violet chanterelle in the genus Thelephora. Jacques Emile Doassans and Narcisse Théophile Patouillard placed it in the genus Neurophyllum (also spelt Nevrophyllum) in 1886, removing it from Cantharellus on account of its orange spores. Charles Horton Peck discarded the name in 1887 and returned G. clavatus to Cantharellus. In 1891, German botanist Otto Kuntze published Revisio generum plantarum, his response to what he perceived as poor method in existing nomenclatural practice. He coined the genus Trombetta to incorporate the violet chanterelle, hence giving it the name Trombetta clavata. However, Kuntze's revisionary program was not accepted by the majority of botanists.

Alexander H. Smith treated Gomphus as a section within Cantharellus in his 1947 review of chanterelles in western North America, as he felt there were no consistent characteristics that distinguished the two genera. In 1966 E. J. H. Corner described a small-spored variety, G. clavatus var. parvispora, from specimens collected in Uganda; it is not considered to have independent taxonomic significance.

Research in the early 2000s combining the use of phylogenetic analyses of DNA sequences and more traditional morphology-based characters has resulted in a reshuffling of the species concept in Gomphus; as a result, G. clavatus is considered the only Gomphus species in North America. Comparison of the DNA sequences of species Gomphus brevipes and G. truncatus has shown them to be genetically identical to G. clavatus, and they may be treated as synonyms.

Gomphus clavatus is commonly known as pig's ears, alluding to the violet underside and yellowish cap of the fruit bodies, although this vernacular name is also used for Discina perlata. Other English common names for this species include clustered chanterelle and violet chanterelle. Gray coined the name clubbed gomphe. In the Sherpa language of Nepal the fungus is known as Eeshyamo ("mother-in-law"), as its imposing fruit body is reminiscent of a mother-in-law, who has a dominant role in a Sherpa family.

== Description ==
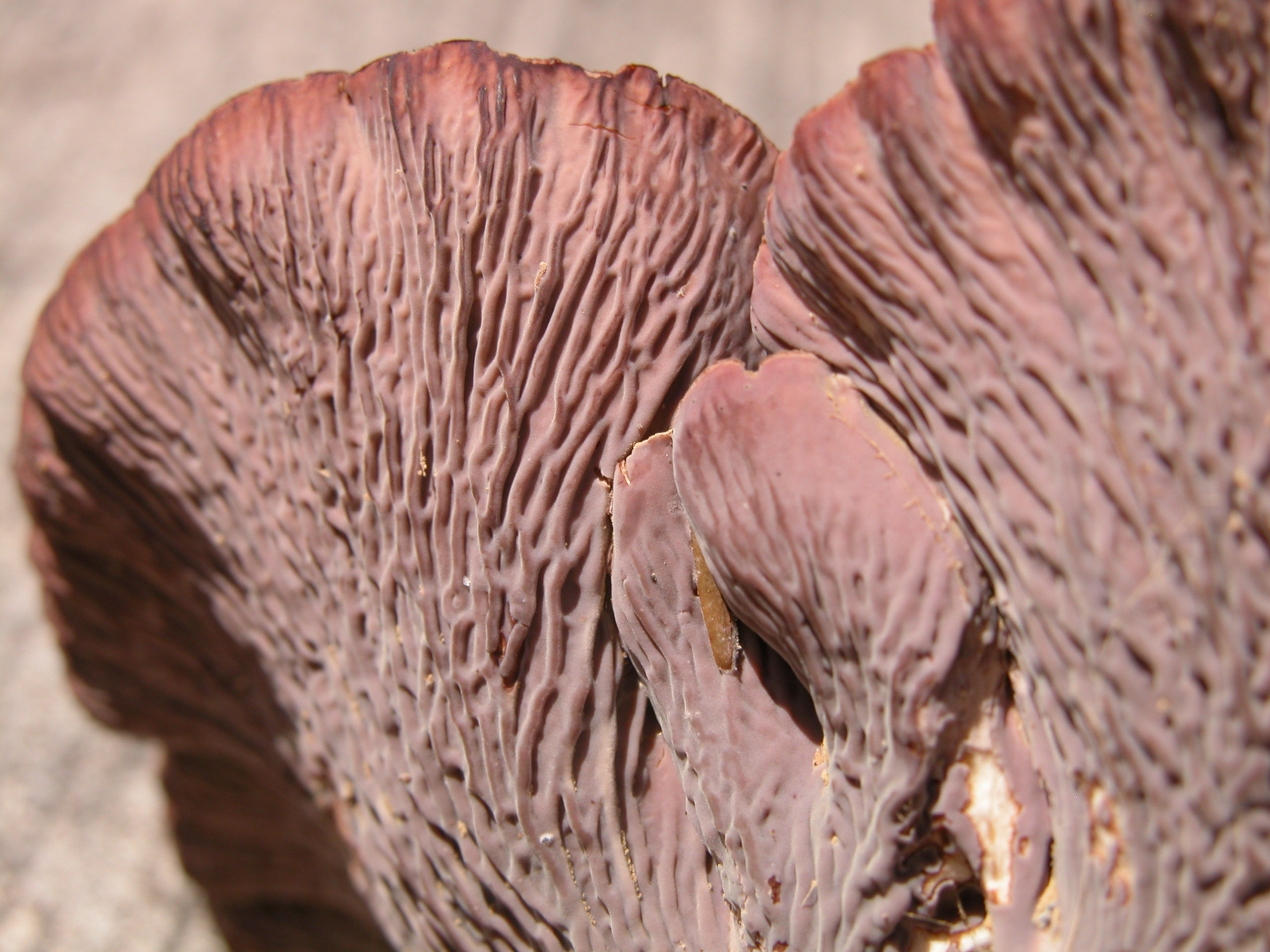
The wrinkled and ridged surface of the hymenium

The basidiocarps, or fruit bodies, of immature Gomphus clavatus are club-shaped and have one cap, but later spread out and have a so-called merismatoid appearance—several vase-shaped caps rising from a common stem. The fruit body is up to 20 cm (8 in) tall and 15 cm (6 in) wide; it is fan-shaped with wavy edges. The upper surfaces of the fruit bodies are covered with brown hyphae (microscopic filaments) that form small, distinct patches towards the margin, but combine to form a continuous felt-like fine-haired area, or tomentum, over the center of the cap. The color of the upper cap surface is orange-brown to violet, but fades to a lighter brown with age. The cap margins of older mushrooms can be quite ragged. The lower spore-bearing surface—the hymenium—is wrinkled, often with folds and pits, and violet to brown in color. The solid stem, which is continuous with the cap, is 0.8–3 cm (3/8–1 1/8 in) wide, 1–10 cm (1/2–4 in) tall, and covered with fine hairs that become coarser (hispid) towards the base. It is often compound, with several fruit bodies arising from the basal portion. Fruit bodies may bruise reddish-brown where handled. The flesh can be whitish-pink to lilac or cinnamon-buff. Thick under the center of the cap, it thins out towards the margins. It can be crunchy, though it is softer than that of the chanterelle. The taste and odor are mild. The spore print is yellow to orange-yellow.

The spores are elliptical, wrinkled or slightly warted, and 10–14 by 5–7.5 μm. They are nonamyloid, meaning they have a negative color reaction with the iodine in Melzer's reagent. The spore-bearing structures, the basidia, are elongated or club-shaped, hyaline (glassy or translucent), and four-spored, with dimensions of 60–90 by 8.5–11.5 μm. G. clavatus does not contain cystidia, the sterile cells associated with basidia in many species. Clamp connections are present.

=== Similar species ===
Gomphus crassipes, found in Spain and North Africa, can only be reliably distinguished from G. clavatus via microscopy; its basidiospores are generally longer (11–17 by 5.5–7 μm) and have a more finely wrinkled surface. Gomphus ludovicianus is also macroscopically very similar. Pseudocraterellus pseudoclavatus (formerly classified in Gomphus) is a lookalike species that grows under conifers in the central United States and westward, also differing on microscopic characters and reaction to potassium hydroxide. Turbinellus floccosus and T. kauffmanii are of similar shape but their caps are covered in scales. The edible blue chanterelle (Polyozellus multiplex) could be confused with G. clavatus, but has distinctive spores.

== Habitat and distribution ==
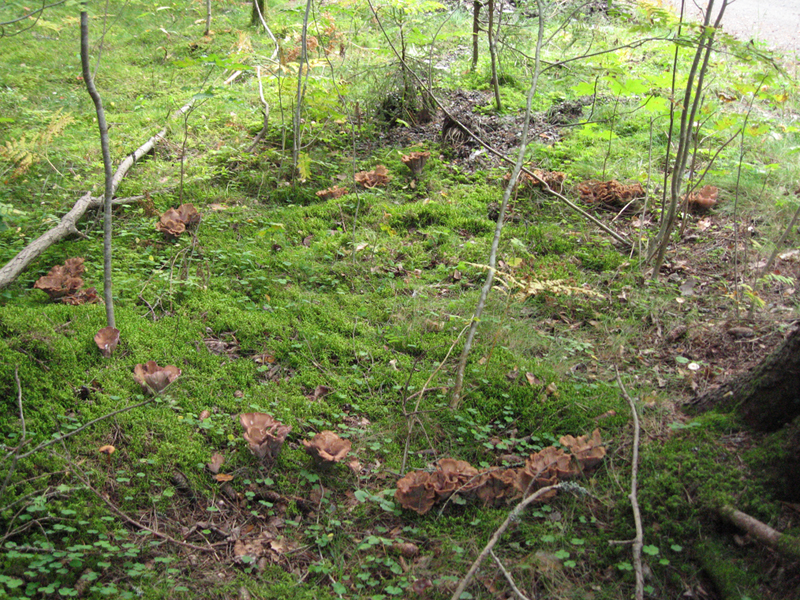
Fruiting in a fairy ring

Growing on the ground, Gomphus clavatus mushrooms appear singly, in clusters or clumps, or even occasionally fairy rings. The species is typically found in coniferous forests, and with a preference for moist, shady areas with deep leaf litter, or rotten wood debris on the ground. It is equally common in older or younger stands of trees. Fruit bodies are easily missed because their colors blend with those of the forest floor. It is more common at elevations of greater than 2,000 ft (600 m). Gomphus clavatus has been reported as forming symbiotic (mycorrhizal) associations with a variety of trees: Abies alba, Abies cephalonica, Abies firma, Abies nephrolepis, Abies religiosa, Picea species, Pinus densiflora, Pseudotsuga menziesii, and Tsuga heterophylla. It is also reported with beech (Fagus sylvatica) in Europe.

In Asia, Gomphus clavatus has been reported from China, Japan, Korea, Malaysia, Nepal, and Pakistan. European countries where the fungus has been reported include Austria, the Czech Republic, France, Germany, Greece, Italy, Lithuania, Poland, Romania, Russia, Sweden, Switzerland, and Turkey. In North America, the fungus has been found across Canada, Mexico, and the United States (October–December on the West Coast and July–October elsewhere), being abundant in the Pacific Northwest.

== Conservation ==
In Europe, Gomphus clavatus appears on the national Red Lists of threatened fungi in 17 countries and is one of 33 species of fungi proposed for international conservation under the Bern Convention. Due to a substantial decline in sightings, Gomphus clavatus became a legally protected species in Hungary on September 1, 2005. It also has legal protection in Slovakia and Slovenia. The species formerly occurred in the British Isles, but has not been seen since 1927 and is now regarded as extinct. The fungus faces loss and degradation of its habitat; eutrophication (increased nitrates in the soil) is another potential threat. Gomphus clavatus was selected as the 1998 Pilz des Jahres ("Mushroom of the Year") by the German Mycological Society, partly to highlight its vulnerable status.

== Edibility ==
Gomphus clavatus is edible; it is rated as choice by some, while others find it tasteless or experience gastric upsets. It has an earthy flavor and meaty texture that has been regarded as suiting red meat dishes. Like many edible fungi, consumption may cause gastrointestinal distress in susceptible individuals. The flesh becomes bitter with age, and older specimens may be infested with insects. Insect infestation is unlikely if the weather is cool. G. clavatus has been used for cooking for some time; Fries included it in his 1867 book Sveriges ätliga och giftiga svampar (Edible and Poisonous Mushrooms in Sweden). It is highly regarded by the Zapotec people of Ixtlán de Juárez in Oaxaca, Mexico, and the Sherpa people in the vicinity of Sagarmatha National Park in Nepal.

Extracts prepared from G. clavatus fruit bodies have a high antioxidant activity, and a high concentration of phenolic and flavonoid compounds. Phenolic compounds identified from the fungus include protocatechuic acid, gallic acid, gentisic acid, vanillic acid, syringic acid, cinnamic acid, caffeic acid, ferulic acid, and tannic acid. In a chemical analysis of collections from the south Aegean Region of Turkey, the fungus was shown to have bioaccumulated the toxic metal cadmium to levels exceeding the maximum intake recommended by the European Union Scientific Committee on Food.
