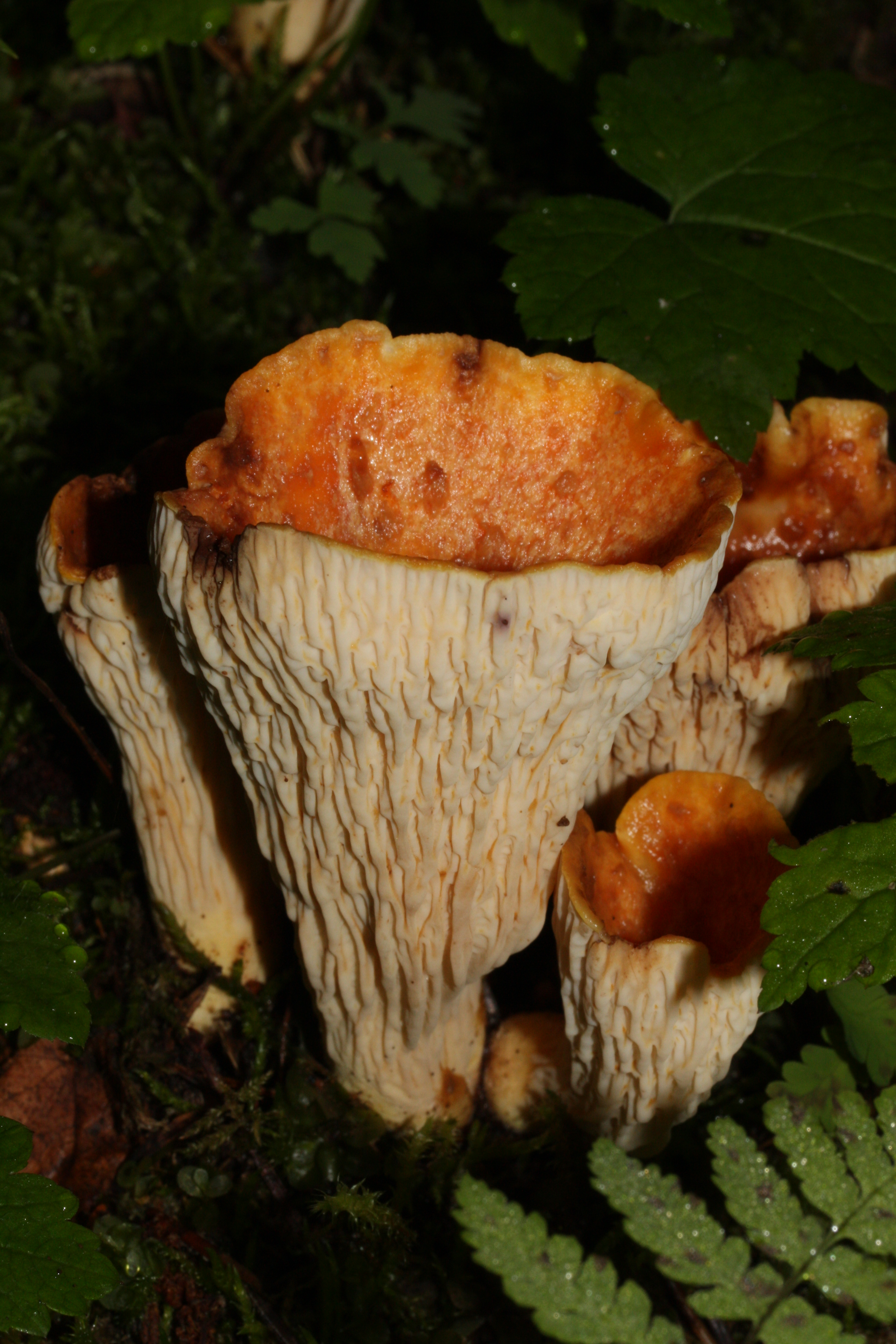
- Found in Mount Baker-Snoqualmie National Forest

Scientific classification
- Kingdom: Fungi
- Division: Basidiomycota
- Class: Agaricomycetes
- Order: Gomphales
- Family: Gomphaceae
- Genus: Turbinellus
- Species: T. floccosus

Binomial name
- Turbinellus floccosus (Schwein.) Earle ex Giachini & Castellano (2011)

Synonyms
- List: Cantharellus floccosus Schwein. (1832); Gomphus floccosus (Schwein.) Singer (1945); Gomphus canadensis (Klotzsch ex Berk.) Corner (1966); Cantharellus canadensis Klotzsch ex Berk (1839); Cantharellus princeps Berk. & M.A. Curtis (1859); Merulius floccosus (Schwein.) Kuntze (1891); Merulius princeps (Berk. & M.A. Curtis) Kuntze (1891); Neurophyllum floccosum (Schwein.) R. Heim (1954); Trombetta canadensis (Klotzsch ex Berk.) Kuntze (1891)

= Turbinellus floccosus =

Species of fungus of the family Gomphaceae native to Asia and North America

Turbinellus floccosus
- Mycological characteristics
- Ridges on hymenium
- Cap is infundibuliform
- Hymenium is decurrent
- Stipe is bare
- Spore print is brown
- Ecology is mycorrhizal
- Edibility is not recommended

Turbinellus floccosus, commonly known as the scaly vase, or sometimes the shaggy, scaly, or woolly chanterelle, is a cantharelloid mushroom of the family Gomphaceae. It was known as Gomphus floccosus until 2011, when it was found to be only distantly related to the genus's type species, G. clavatus. It was consequently transferred from Gomphus to Turbinellus. The orange-capped vase- or trumpet-shaped fruiting bodies may reach 30 cm (12 in) high and 30 cm (12 in) wide. The lower surface, the hymenium, is covered in wrinkles and ridges rather than gills or pores, and is pale buff or yellowish to whitish.

Native to Asia and North America, T. floccosus forms symbiotic (ectomycorrhizal) relationships with various types of conifer, growing in coniferous woodlands across Eastern Asia, from North Korea to Pakistan, and in North America, more frequently in the west, in late summer and autumn. Though mild-tasting, they generally cause gastrointestinal symptoms of nausea, vomiting and diarrhea when consumed. T. floccosus is eaten by local people in northeastern India, Nepal and Mexico.

== Taxonomy ==
This species was first described as Cantharellus floccosus in 1834 by American mycologist Lewis David de Schweinitz, who reported it growing in beech woods in Mount Pocono, Pennsylvania. Its specific epithet is derived from the Latin floccus, meaning "tuft, or flock, of wool". In 1839, Miles Joseph Berkeley named a specimen from Canada as Cantharellus canadensis based on a manuscript by Johann Friedrich Klotzsch, noting its affinity to C. clavatus. A large specimen collected in Maine by Charles James Sprague was described as Cantharellus princeps in 1859 by Berkeley and Moses Ashley Curtis. In 1891, German botanist Otto Kuntze renamed Cantharellus canadensis as Trombetta canadensis, and C. floccosus as Merulius floccosus. (Note: Kuntze published Revisio Generum Plantarum, his response to what he perceived as a lack of method in existing nomenclatural practice. Three taxa received new names: Kuntze coined the genus Trombetta, to incorporate Cantharellus canadensis (as Trombetta canadensis), while C. floccosus and C. princeps became Merulius floccosus and M. princeps respectively. However, Kuntze's revisionary program was not accepted by the majority of botanists.)

Franklin Sumner Earle made C. floccosus the type species of the new genus Turbinellus in 1909, in which he placed two other North American species. He remarked that the three "constitute a striking and well-marked genus which seems to have more in common with the club-shaped species of Craterellus than with the following genus where they have always been placed." This was not widely taken up, as Earle's new combination was not published validly according to nomenclatural rules.

American mycologist Elizabeth Eaton Morse described Cantharellus bonarii in 1930. The type locality was General Grant National Park in Fresno County, California. In 1945 C. floccosus and Morse's C. bonarii were transferred to Gomphus by Rolf Singer. The generic name is derived from the Ancient Greek γομφος, gomphos, meaning "plug" or "large wedge-shaped nail". Alex H. Smith treated the members of Gomphus as two sections—Gomphus and Excavatus—within Cantharellus in his 1947 review of chanterelles in western North America, as he felt there were no consistent characteristics that distinguished the genera. The shaggy chanterelle was placed in the latter section due to its scaly cap, lack of clamp connections and rusty-colored spores. Roger Heim classified it in the genus Nevrophyllum, before E. J. H. Corner returned it to Gomphus in 1966.

It was known as Gomphus floccosus until 2011, when it was found to be only distantly related to the genus's type species, G. clavatus. The genus Gomphus, along with several others in the Gomphaceae, was reorganized in the 2010s after molecular analysis confirmed that the older morphology-based classification did not accurately represent phylogenetic relationships. Thus the genus Turbinellus was resurrected and the taxon became Turbinellus floccosus. Giachini also concluded G. bonarii was the same species.

T. floccosus has been given the common names of scaly vase chanterelle, scaly chanterelle, woolly chanterelle, or shaggy chanterelle, though it is more closely related to stinkhorns than true chanterelles. In Nepal, in the Sherpa language, it is known as diyo chyau or khumbhe chyau, from the words diyo, meaning "oil lamp" and chyau, meaning "mushroom", as the fruit bodies have a shape similar to the local oil lamps. In Mexico, it is known as corneta or trompeta, or by the indigenous words oyamelnanácatl ("fir mushroom", from Nahuatl oyametl "fir", and nanacatl "mushroom"), tlapitzal (derived from tlapitzalli, Nahuatl for "trumpet") or tlapitzananácatl in Tlaxcala.

== Description ==
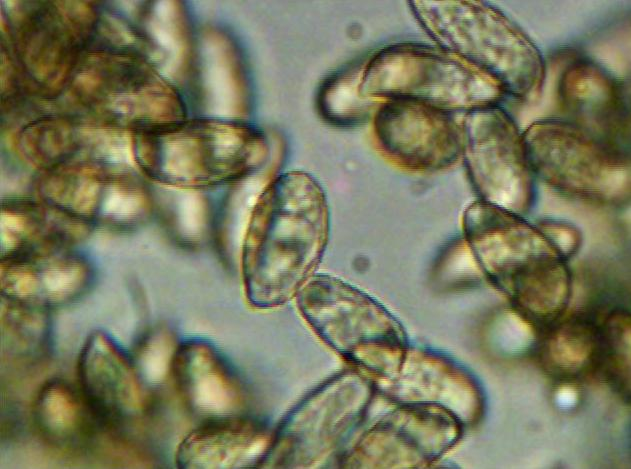
Oval spores in Melzer's solution, seen through a microscope

Adult fruit bodies are initially cylindrical, maturing to trumpet- or vase-shaped and reaching up to 30 cm (12 in) in height and width. There is no clear demarcation between the cap and stipe. The stipe can be up to 15 cm (6 in) tall and 6 cm (2 1/2 in) wide, though it tapers to a narrower base. It is solid in younger specimens, though is often hollowed out by insect larvae in older. At higher elevations, two or three fruit bodies may arise from one stipe. Colored various shades of reddish- to yellowish-orange, the cap surface is broken into scales, with the spaces between more yellow and the scales themselves more orange. The most colorful specimens occur in warm humid weather. Older specimens are often paler.

The white flesh is fibrous and thick, though thins with age. Somewhat brittle, it can sometimes turn brown when cut or bruised. The smell has been reported as indistinct or "earthy and sweet", and the taste "sweet and sour". The spore-bearing undersurface is irregularly folded, forked or ridged rather than gilled and is pale buff or yellowish to whitish in color. These ridges are up to 4 mm (1/8 in) high, and are decurrent—they extend below and run down the cap's attachment to the stipe, though irregularly so. The spore print is brownish, the spores ellipsoid with dimensions of 12.4–16.8 × 5.8–7.3 μm. The spore surface is roughened with ornamentations that can be made visible under the microscope by staining with methyl blue.

The fruit bodies can last for some considerable time, growing slowly over a month. Mushrooms in subalpine and alpine areas are typically heavy-set with a short stipe, their growth slower in the cold climate. This latter form is seen at lower altitudes in colder seasons. Smith gave this the name forma rainierensis. Conversely, mushrooms at low altitudes, such as in the redwood forests, can grow and expand rapidly with large caps that have prominent scales. Smith described a paler form with a solid stipe from the Sierra Nevada as forma wilsonii. American mycologist R. H. Petersen described an olive-capped form that is otherwise identical to the typical form. These forms are not recognised as distinct.

=== Similar species ===
Lookalike species

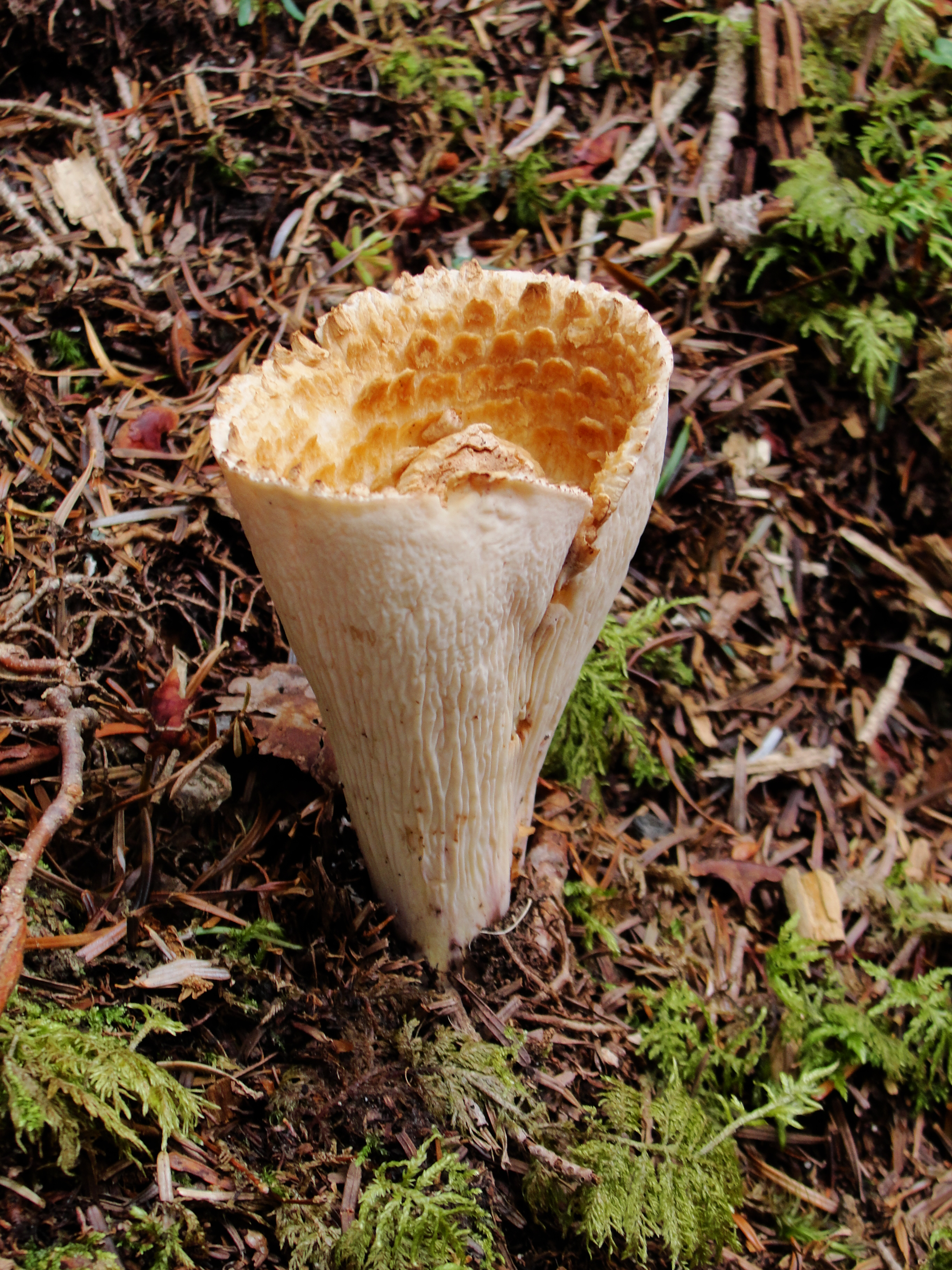
Turbinellus fujisanensis

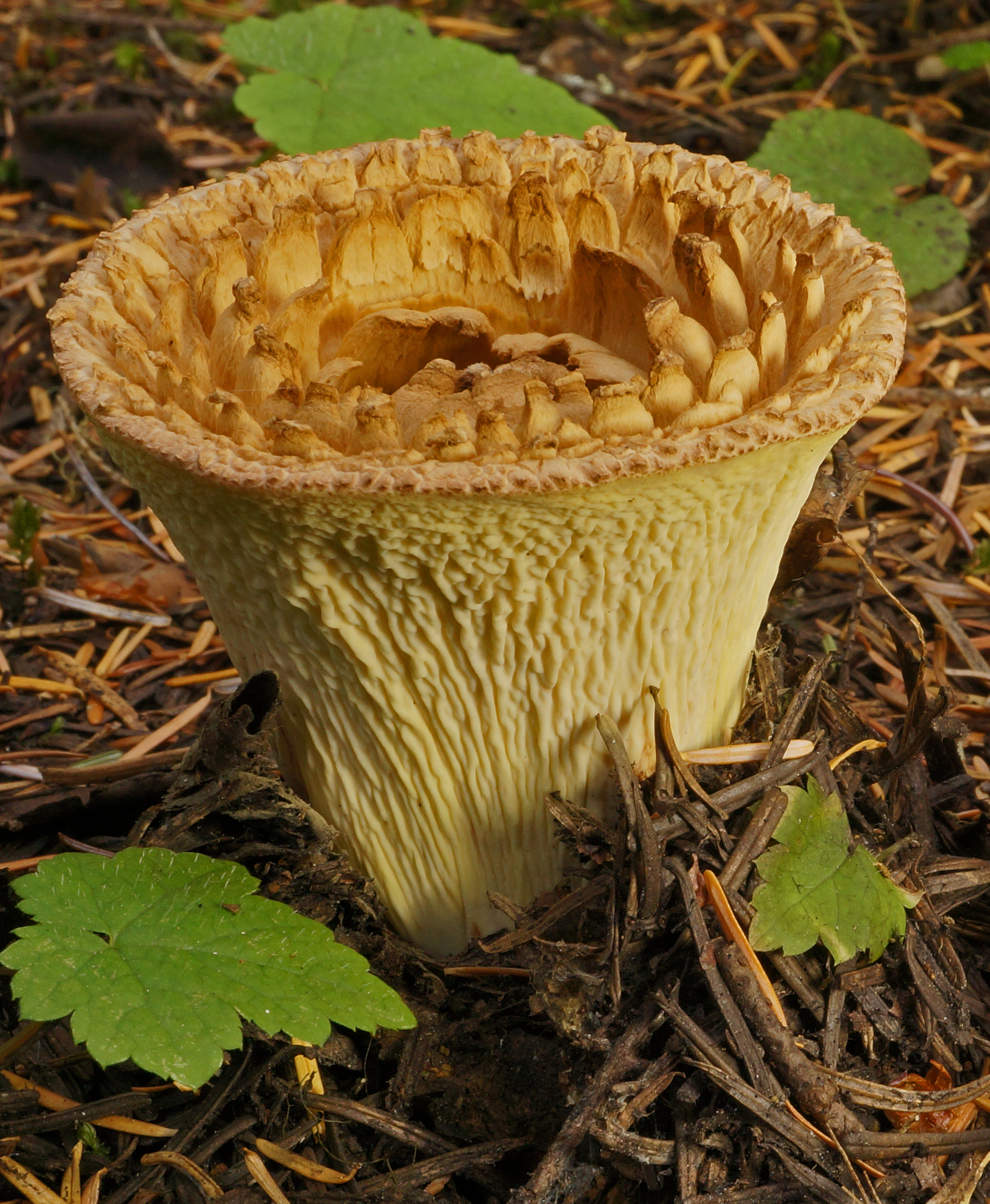
Turbinellus kauffmanii

The related Turbinellus kauffmanii, found in western North America, is similar-looking but has a pale brown cap. Younger specimens of the latter species also have a pungent smell. Turbinellus fujisanensis, found in Japan, is another lookalike that has smaller spores than T. floccosus. Gomphus clavatus is superficially similar.

== Distribution and habitat ==
The fungus appears to form symbiotic (ectomycorrhizal) relationships with various conifers including Douglas-fir (Pseudotsuga menziesii), fir (Abies) species such as momi fir (Abies firma), European silver fir (A. alba) and Khinghan fir (A. nephrolepis), pine (Pinus) species such as Pinus densiflora and western hemlock (Tsuga heterophylla). In Mexico, the fungus associates with Abies religiosa—the mycorrhizal association between these two species has been synthesized under controlled laboratory conditions. T. floccosus is more abundant in older stands of trees and places where there is more decomposed wood on the forest floor.

The species occurs in coniferous forests in North America, particularly the western states in late summer and autumn. It is most abundant in rainy parts of the Pacific Northwest, northern California and the Sierra Nevada. It also occurs across Asia, having been recorded from Japan, North Korea, China, Tibet, India, Nepal and Pakistan. Turbinellus floccosus has been occasionally recorded from introduced conifer plantations in Australia.

== Toxicity and chemistry ==
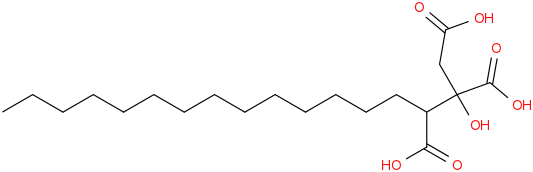
α-tetradecylcitric acid

Turbinellus floccosus is poisonous to some people who eat it, but has been consumed without incident by others. Nausea, vomiting and diarrhea may occur, though are sometimes delayed by up to 8–14 hours. A tricarboxylic acid known as α-tetradecylcitric acid may be responsible for the extreme gastrointestinal symptoms. Laboratory experiments showed it increased tone of guinea pig smooth muscle of the small bowel (ileum), and that when given to rats, it led to mydriasis, skeletal muscle weakness, and central nervous system depression. Turbinellus floccosus contains more than double the amount of this acid than the related T. kauffmanii.

Despite its toxicity, T. floccosus is one of the ten wild mushrooms most widely consumed by ethnic tribes in Meghalaya, northeast India, and is highly regarded by the Sherpa people in the vicinity of Sagarmatha National Park in Nepal. What is not known is whether the Indian populations of T. floccosus are nontoxic, or whether the local people have developed an immunity to it. It is also enjoyed in Mexico. American mycologist David Arora reported that he felt the mushroom had a strong sour taste.

The fruit body of T. floccosus produces oxylipins that are active against the fungal plant pathogens Colletotrichum fragariae, C. gloeosporioides, and C. acutatum. Extracts of the fungus have shown in standard laboratory tests to have antimicrobial activity against several human pathogens. T. floccosus also contains the spermidine alkaloid pistillarin, a siderophore that inhibits DNA damage by hydroxyl radicals generated by the Fenton reaction. Pistillarin is responsible for the green color obtained when iron salts are applied to the fruit body surface.
