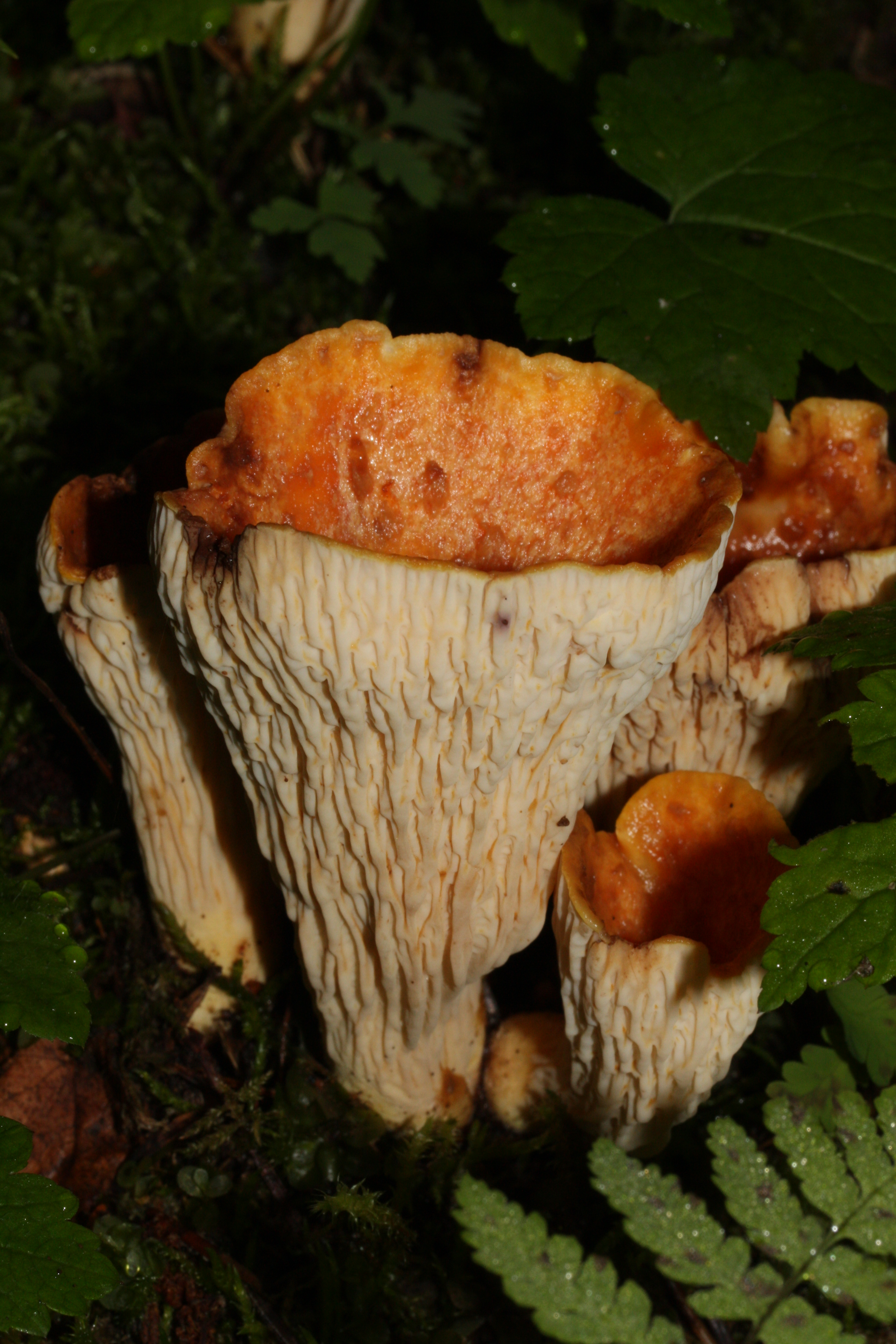
- Turbinellus floccosus

Scientific classification
- Kingdom: Fungi
- Division: Basidiomycota
- Class: Agaricomycetes
- Order: Gomphales
- Family: Gomphaceae
- Genus: Turbinellus; Earle (1909)

Type species
- Turbinellus floccosus (Schwein.) Earle (1909)

Species
- T. flabellatus; T. floccosus; T. fujisanensis; T. kauffmanii; T. stereoides

= Turbinellus =

Genus of fungi

Turbinellus is a genus of five species of fungi in the family Gomphaceae.

== Taxonomy ==
Turbinellus was circumscribed by Franklin Sumner Earle in 1909. Of the three species originally placed in the genus he remarked "They constitute a striking and well-marked genus which seems to have more in common with the club-shaped species of Craterellus than with the following genus where they have always been placed." The genus, along with several others in the Gomphaceae, was reorganized in the 2010s after molecular analysis revealed that the older morphology-based classification did not accurately represent phylogenetic relationships. The type species, Turbinellus floccosus, had been placed before then in the genus Gomphus.

== Description ==
Fruit bodies of Turbinellus species are wrinkled, with a turbinate shape–like an inverted cone or funnel. The flesh is thick and cork-like. The hymenium (the fertile surface where spores are produced) have an irregular texture with folds that are forked and reticulate.

== Species ==
| Image | Scientific name | Distribution |
|---|---|---|
| | Turbinellus flabellatus (Berk.) Giachini 2011 | Japan |
| | Turbinellus floccosus (Schwein.) Earle ex Giachini & Castellano 2011 | widespread |
| | Turbinellus fujisanensis (S.Imai) Giachini 2011 | Japan |
| | Turbinellus kauffmanii (A.H.Sm.) Giachini 2011 | United States |
| | Turbinellus stereoides (Corner) Giachini 2011 | Asia |
