= Turbinellus stereoides =

Scientific classification
- Domain: Eukaryota
- Kingdom: Fungi
- Division: Basidiomycota
- Class: Agaricomycetes
- Order: Gomphales
- Family: Gomphaceae
- Genus: Turbinellus
- Species: T. stereoides

Binomial name
- Turbinellus stereoides (Corner) Giachini (2011)

Synonyms
- Gomphus stereoides Corner (1966)

Species of fungus

Turbinellus stereoides, previously known as Gomphus stereoides, is a mushroom in the family Gomphaceae. It was originally described in 1996 by E. J. H. Corner as a species of Gomphus. The type collection was made in 1930 in Slim River, Malaysia.

The genus Gomphus, along with several others in the Gomphaceae, was reorganized in the 2010s after molecular analysis confirmed that the older morphology-based classification did not accurately represent phylogenetic relationships. Admir Giachini transferred the fungus to Turbinellus in 2011.

In 2010 Turbinellus stereoides was reported from Turkey.
