= Gomphus calakmulensis =

Scientific classification
- Domain: Eukaryota
- Kingdom: Fungi
- Division: Basidiomycota
- Class: Agaricomycetes
- Order: Gomphales
- Family: Gomphaceae
- Genus: Gomphus
- Species: G. calakmulensis

Binomial name
- Gomphus calakmulensis M.Villegas & J.Cifuentes

Species of fungus

Gomphus calakmulensis is a species of fungus in the genus Gomphus, family Gomphaceae. It has been recorded from Calakmul in Campeche province in Mexico.
