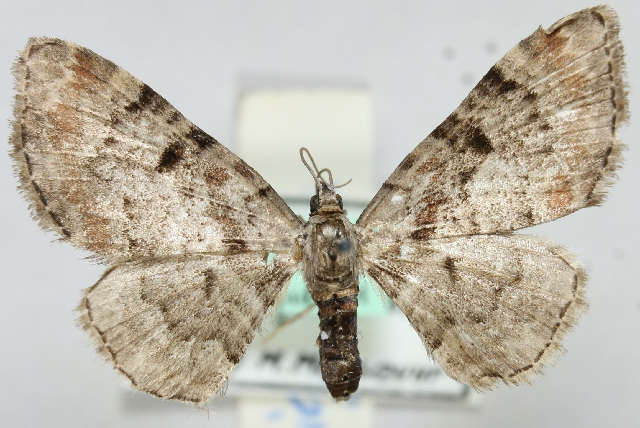

Scientific classification
- Domain: Eukaryota
- Kingdom: Animalia
- Phylum: Arthropoda
- Class: Insecta
- Order: Lepidoptera
- Family: Geometridae
- Genus: Eupithecia
- Species: E. gigantea

Binomial name
- Eupithecia gigantea Staudinger, 1897

Synonyms
- Cidaria karafutonis Matsumura, 1925

= Eupithecia gigantea =

Species of moth

Eupithecia gigantea is a moth in the family Geometridae. It is found in the Russian Far East, Japan and Korea.

The wingspan is about 27 mm. The ground colour of the wings is greyish. It is very similar to Eupithecia abietaria. The larvae feed within the cones of Pinus strobus and Abies sachalinensis.
