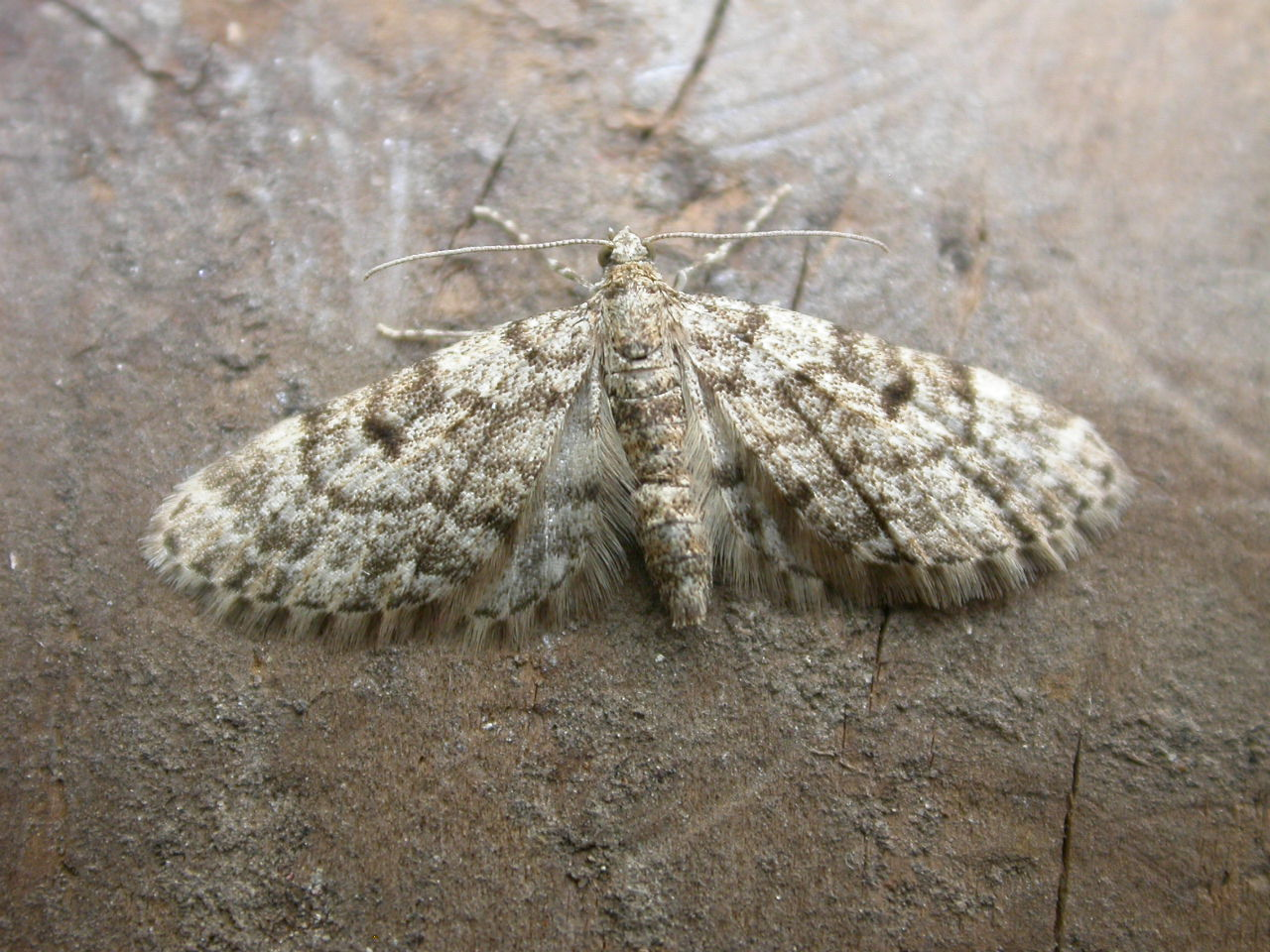

Scientific classification
- Domain: Eukaryota
- Kingdom: Animalia
- Phylum: Arthropoda
- Class: Insecta
- Order: Lepidoptera
- Family: Geometridae
- Genus: Eupithecia
- Species: E. tantillaria

Binomial name
- Eupithecia tantillaria Boisduval, 1840

Synonyms
- Eupithecia calabrica Dietze, 1910; Eupithecia laricis Speyer, 1873

= Eupithecia tantillaria =

Species of moth

Eupithecia tantillaria, the dwarf pug, is a moth of the family Geometridae. It was described by Jean Baptiste Boisduval in 1840. The species can be found in the Palearctic realm.

== Distribution ==
The distribution ranges from western Europe and the British Isles east to Ukraine, Georgia, Russia, Russian Far East and the Altai Mountains. In Fennoscandia it reaches Sápmi, it is still lacking on Iceland. The southern range includes Italy, the Balkans, Turkey, Asia Minor and the Caucasus. It is lacking, however, in the south and in the centre of Spain, in Portugal and the Mediterranean islands. In the Alps it rises up to the tree line.

== Description ==
The wingspan is 16–19 millimetres (0.63–0.75 in). The ground colour of the forewings is light grey. There is a distinct, usually stretched discal spot and dark grey to brownish wavy crosslines, which continue on the rear wings. There are darker patches along the costal edge of the forewing, a paler white sub-marginal line and a chequered wing fringe. The hindwings are pale white with brown crosslines and a small black discal spot. Both forewings and hindwings are narrow. Darkened specimens with less distinctive pattern occur. The caterpillars are light brown to chocolate brown coloured and have a wide dark dorsal stripe. As a result, they resemble dead, dried-up needles and are thus inconspicuous on their host trees and well protected from predators.

The moths flies from April to July depending on the location.

The caterpillars feed on Norway spruce and also other Pinophyta species, such as fir, European larch and Juniperus communis.

== Subspecies ==
- Eupithecia tantillaria tantillaria
- Eupithecia tantillaria piceata Prout, 1915

== Similar species ==
Eupithecia analoga also lives in coniferous forests and has similar drawing elements to tantillaria, but can be distinguished by the larger and rounder discal spot on the front wings as well as the evenly rounded centre line on the slightly darker hind wings. As with many Eupithecia species, a reliable determination by specialists should be made, and a genital morphological analysis is also recommended for a clear assignment.
