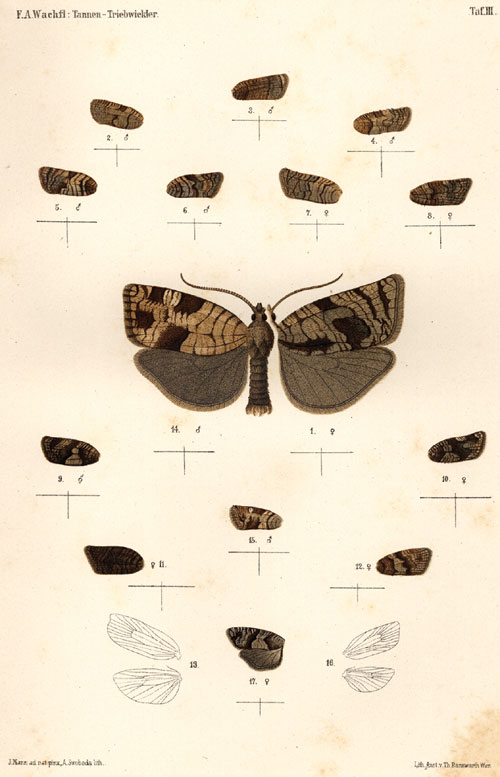

Scientific classification
- Kingdom: Animalia
- Phylum: Arthropoda
- Clade: Pancrustacea
- Class: Insecta
- Order: Lepidoptera
- Family: Tortricidae
- Genus: Choristoneura
- Species: C. murinana

Binomial name
- Choristoneura murinana (Hübner, 1799)

Synonyms
- Tortrix murinana Hubner, [1796-1799]; Tortrix besseri Nowicki, 1860; Tortrix caprimulgana Koch, 1859; Tortrix histrionana Ratzeburg, 1868; Tortrix murinana var. immaculana Wachtl, 1882

= Choristoneura murinana =

Species of moth

Choristoneura murinana is a moth of the family Tortricidae. It is found in central Europe and the Near East, China (Heilongjiang, Gansu, Qinghai), Taiwan and in North America.

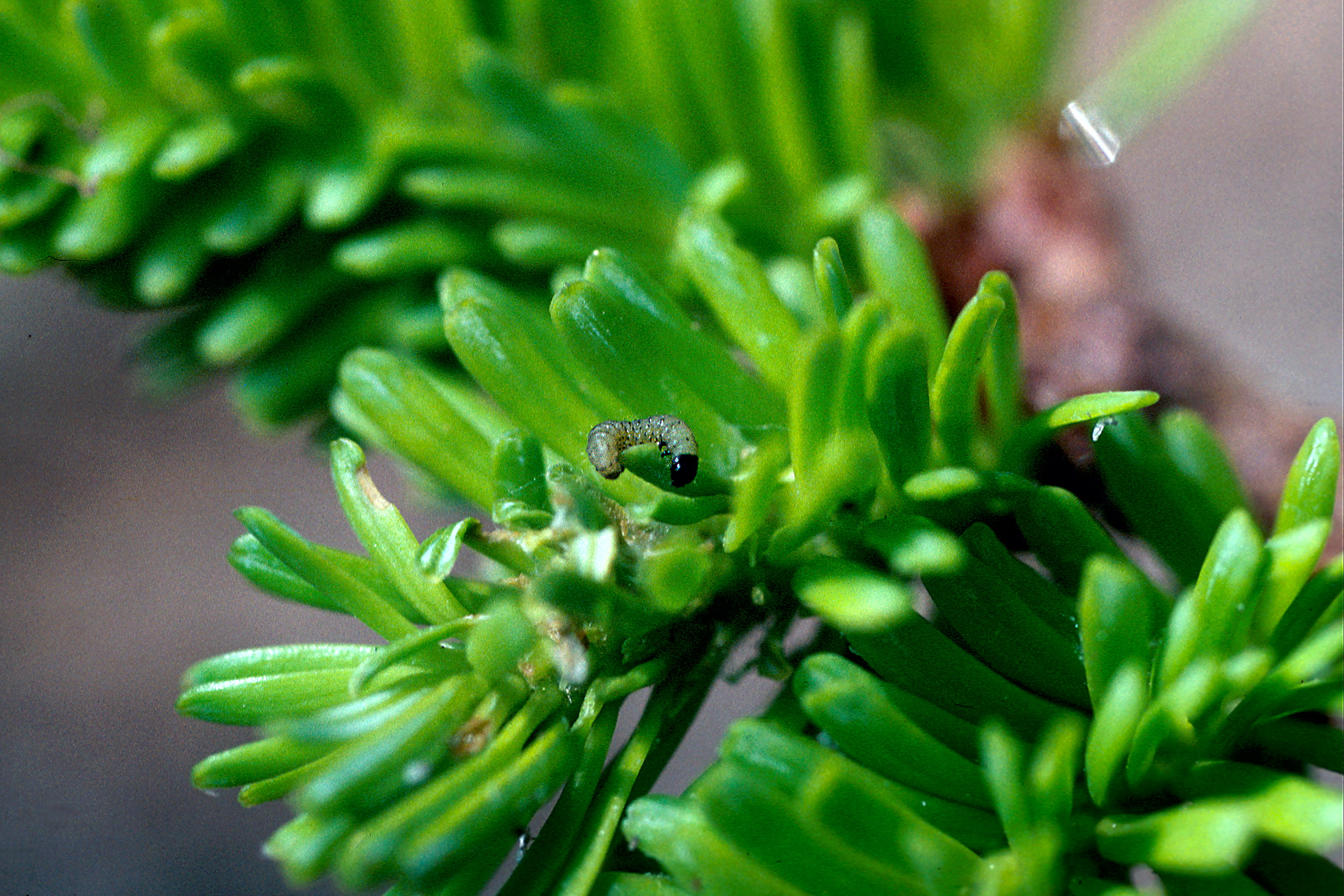
Caterpillar

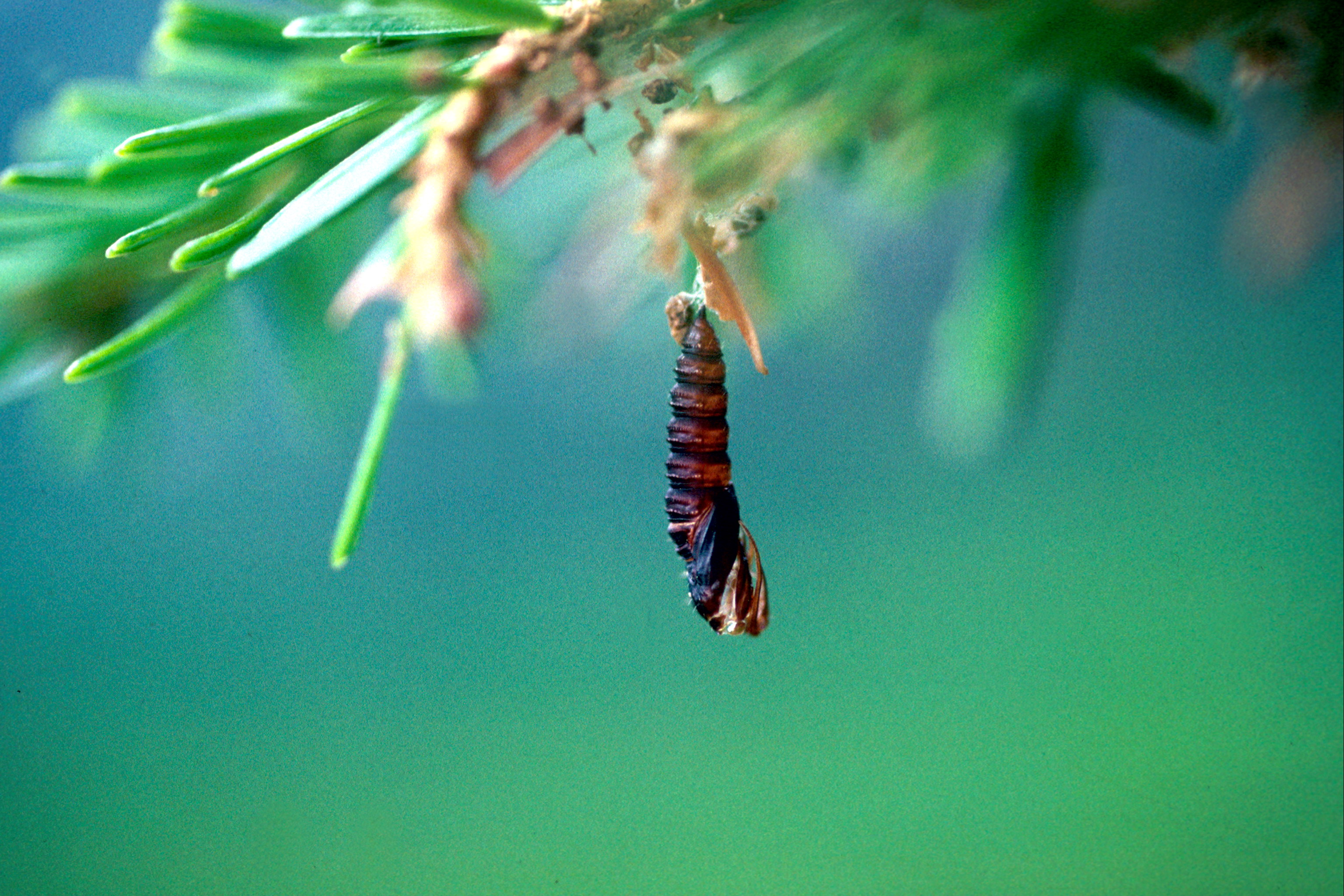
Pupa

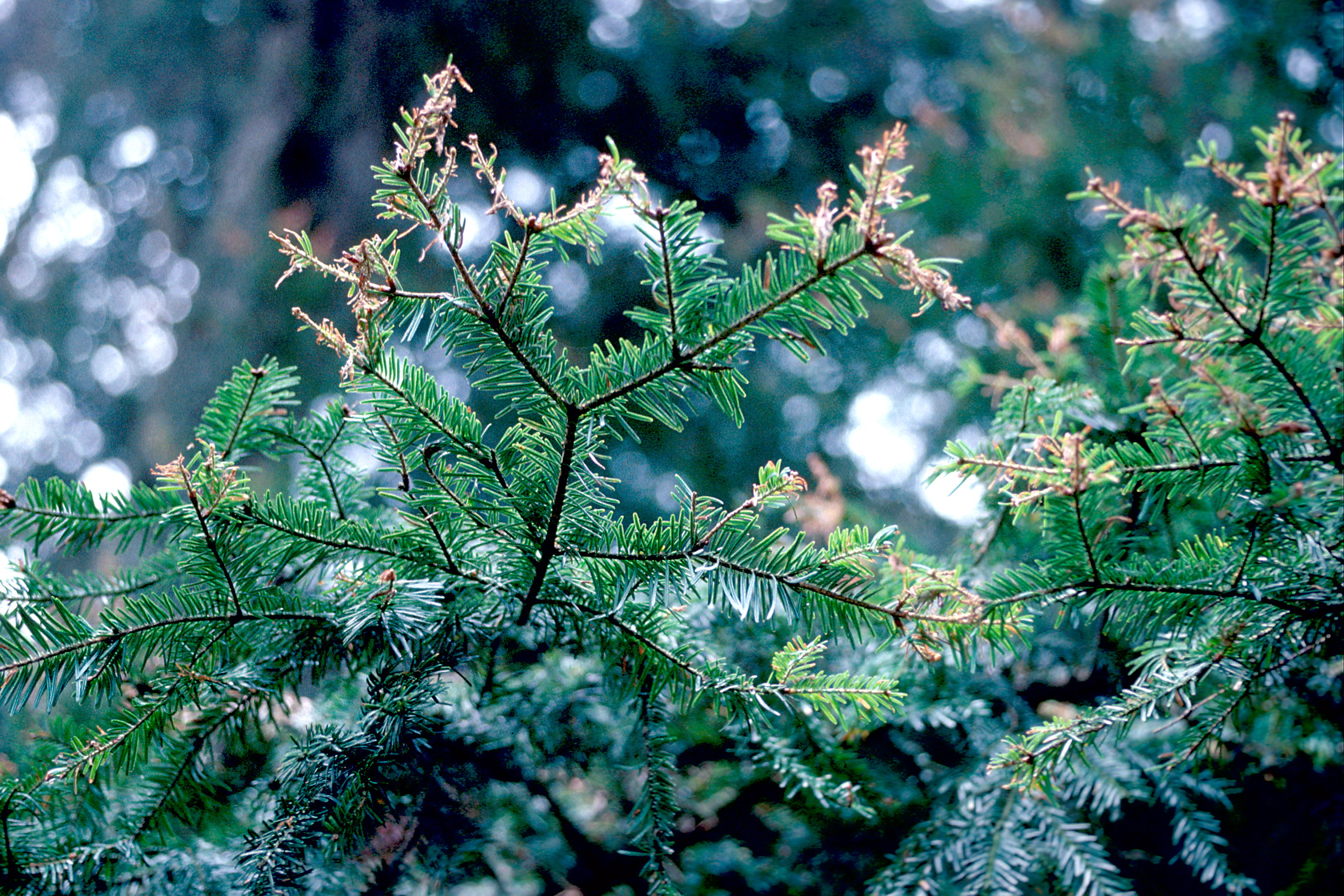
Damage

The wingspan is 17–24 mm. There is one generation per year.

The larvae feed on Abies alba, Abies nephrolepis and in North America also Cedrus Juniperus Picea, Pinus and Pseudotsuga species. Young larvae feed on new shoot of their host plant. Pupation takes place on the ground near the host. The species overwinters as a young larva.
