= Gomphus =

Gomphus can refer to either one of two genera of living organism:

- Gomphus (dragonfly), a widespread genus of dragonfly
- Gomphus (fungus), a small genus of fungus
