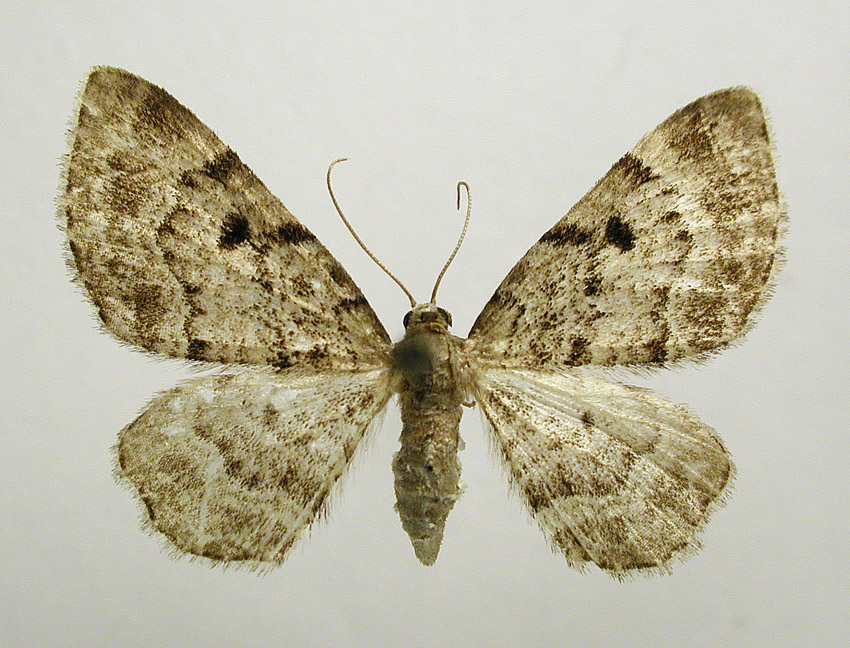

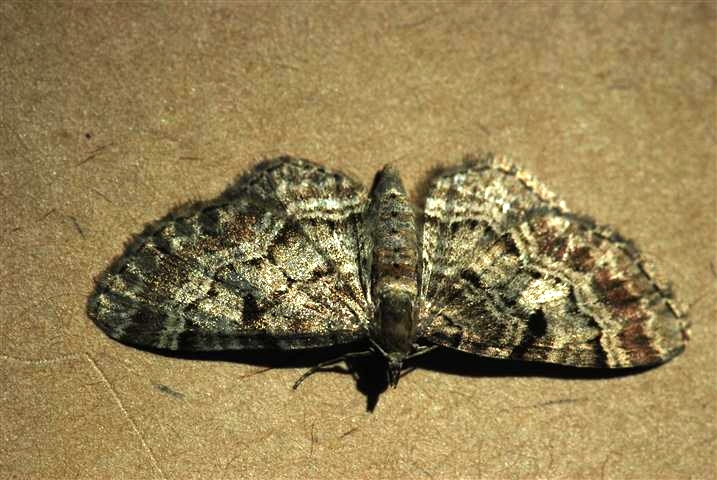

Scientific classification
- Domain: Eukaryota
- Kingdom: Animalia
- Phylum: Arthropoda
- Class: Insecta
- Order: Lepidoptera
- Family: Geometridae
- Genus: Eupithecia
- Species: E. abietaria

Binomial name
- Eupithecia abietaria (Goeze, 1781)

Synonyms
- List: Phalaena abietaria Goeze, 1781; Acidalia bilunulata Zetterstedt, 1840; Eupithecia bilunulata; Phalaena pini Retzius, 1781; Eupithecia pini; Phalaena strobilata Borkhausen, 1794; Geometra togata Hubner, 1817

= Cloaked pug =

Species of moth

The cloaked pug (Eupithecia abietaria) is a moth of the family Geometridae. The species was first described by Johann August Ephraim Goeze in 1781 and it can be found in Europe and to the east in Siberia and Japan.

The wingspan is 21–23 mm. It is a large and handsome species, the lines sharply expressed and marked with black teeth or dashes on the veins. There is a very large discal dot and two red-brown bands. The face is without well-developed cone of scales and the palpus is about twice as long as the diameter of the eye The forewing has a double areole . - ab. constricta ab. nov.[Prout] has the median area reduced to a width of only 1-2 mm. and the antemedian and postmedian lines ere connected by black veins. - debrunneata Stgr., from the Ussuri district, is more mixed with blackish, the red-brown tone wanting - gigantea Stgr.[now species Eupithecia gigantea Staudinger, 1897], from the Ussuri district and Japan, is darker grey than in debrunneata, the reddish bands (as in rufescens) strongly developed. The oval egg is characterized by regular, large, hexagonal depressions on the shell sculpture. Final instar larvae are thick, fleshy red coloured and show no patterns. The pupa is dark reddish-brown and has two strong hook bristles on the cremaster as well as several fine bristles.

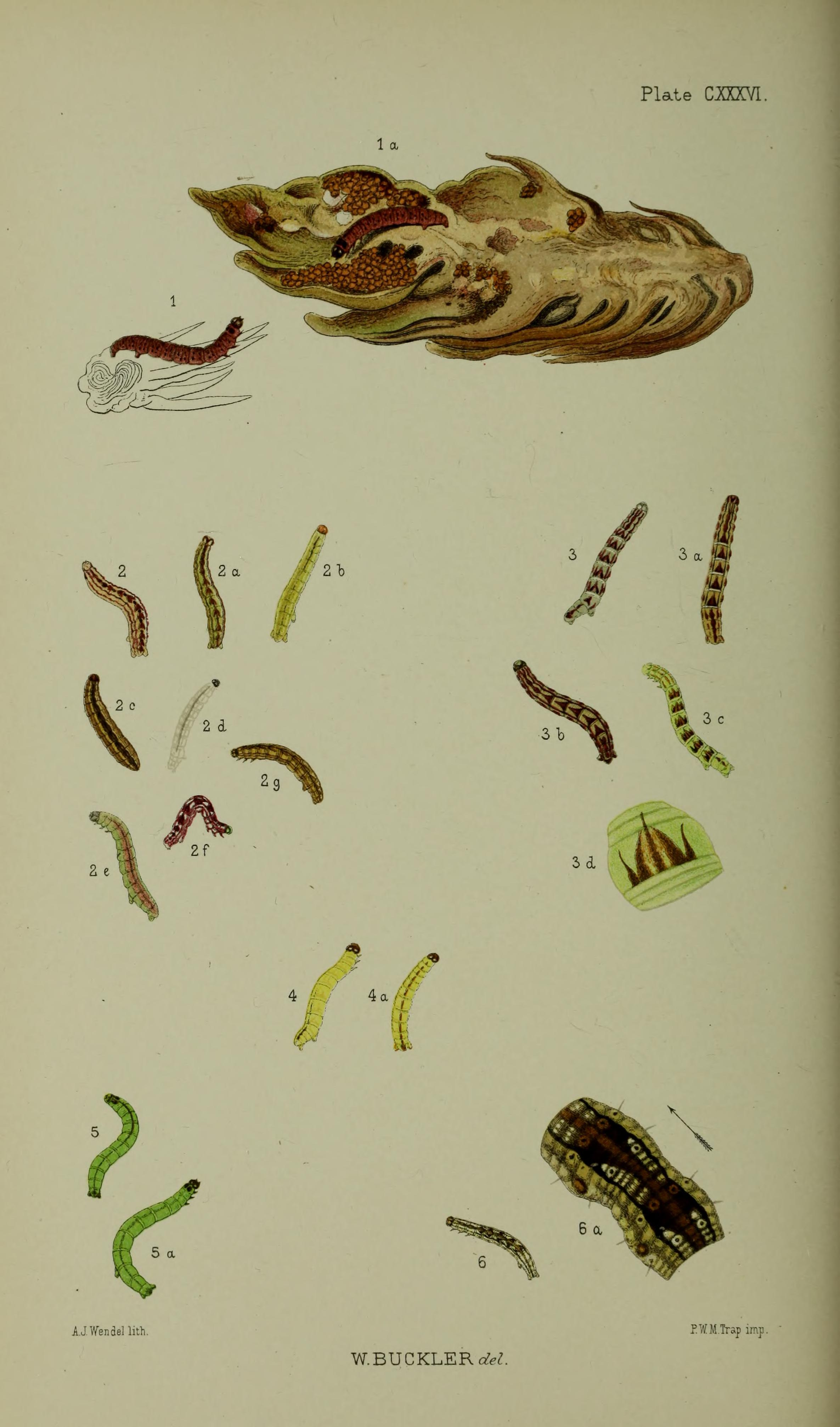
Figs 1,1a larvae in various stages of growth

The moths flies from June to July depending on the location.

The larvae feed on Picea abies, Picea sitchensis and Abies procera.

== Subspecies ==
There are two recognized subspecies:

- Eupithecia abietaria abietaria
- Eupithecia abietaria debrunneata

== Similar species ==
Eupithecia analoga is smaller, has less contrasted markings and differs in particular by the significantly longer palpi.

A genital morphological examination is also recommended for a clear assignment.
