= Gomphus pleurobrunnescens =

Scientific classification
- Domain: Eukaryota
- Kingdom: Fungi
- Division: Basidiomycota
- Class: Agaricomycetes
- Order: Gomphales
- Family: Gomphaceae
- Genus: Gomphus
- Species: G. pleurobrunnescens

Binomial name
- Gomphus pleurobrunnescens M.Villegas & A.Kong

Species of fungus

Gomphus pleurobrunnescens is a species of fungus in the genus Gomphus, family Gomphaceae. It has been recorded from tropical locales of southeastern Mexico.
