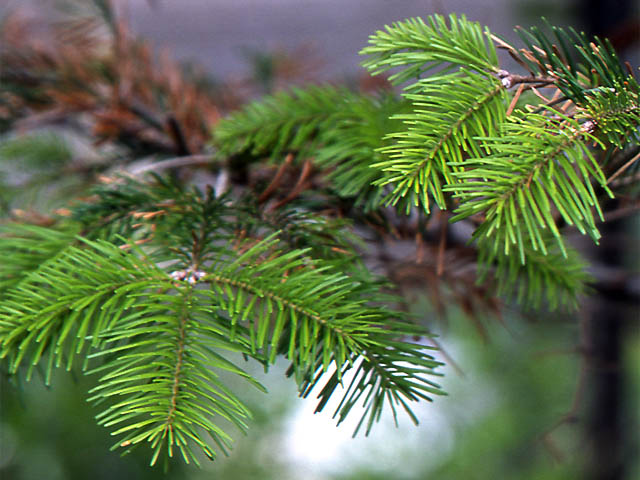

Conservation status
- Least Concern (IUCN 3.1)

Scientific classification
- Kingdom: Plantae
- Clade: Tracheophytes
- Clade: Gymnospermae
- Division: Pinophyta
- Class: Pinopsida
- Order: Pinales
- Family: Pinaceae
- Genus: Abies
- Species: A. sachalinensis

Binomial name
- Abies sachalinensis F.Schmidt

= Abies sachalinensis =

Species of conifer

Abies sachalinensis, the Sakhalin fir, is a species of conifer in the family Pinaceae. It is found in Sakhalin island and southern Kurils (Russia), and also in northern Hokkaido (Japan). The first discovery by a European was by Carl Friedrich Schmidt (1832-1908), the Baltic German botanist, on the Russian island of Sakhalin in 1866, but he did not introduce it to Europe. The plant was re-discovered by the English plant-collector, Charles Maries in 1877 near Aomori on the main Japanese island of Honshū, who initially thought it to be a variety of Abies veitchii. Abies nephrolepis (khingan fir) is known to be the closest relative, which exists on the mainland just west of the range of Sakhalin fir.

== Description ==
Grows to 30m tall with Girths up to 100 cm. The crown pyramidal, but tend to flatten out as they grow to old age. Branches are long and slender during the life time. As you move down to more northern parts of its habitat they tend to grow shorter. hardiness zone of 5 (cold limit is between -23.3 Degree C and -28.8 Degree C)

== Distribution ==
Been seen at sea level up to 1,650m in different areas, but on Sakhalin Island it sits at elevations of 800-1,100m in pure stands or in mixed forests with Picea jezoensis(Yezo spruce) and Picea glehnii around the treeline. It is also found in lower elevations with broadleaf trees including Betula ermanii (Erman's birch), Castanea crenulata, Kalopanax septemlobus(castor aralia), and Magnolia hypoleuca.

== Habitat ==
Cool summers, mild winters, and precipitation around 1,500mm. Half or more falls during the winter. soils tend to be well drained and moist. Does not do well in water logged soil. very shade tolerant when young, growth is slower in dense shade. It likes slightly acidic soils at a PH of around 5.

== Uses ==
Mainly logged for the production of wood pulp for the paper industry. It is a used for cultivations in gardens and arboreta in Russia, Northern Europe, England, and US. Abies sachalinesis is used for dyeing/tanning, essential oils, fibers, timber, and medicine. It is also made into products such as boxes, crates, pallets, posts, stakes, fences, wall paneling, and for use in carpentry (exterior/interior). It is an important plantation species in Hokkaido, while the other Abies species are not used in plantations.

== Bark and needles ==
Bark is greyish white, as it grows older the bark starts to get rough to the touch. Needles cover the shoots above and on the sides similar to the Abies veitchii, Needle length is .5 to 1.4 inches long (1.2-3.5 cm) and .04 to .05 inches wide (1-1.2mm). Soft in texture with a glossy fresh green color.

== Seeds and cones ==
Seed cones are cylindric, from 2-3.2 inches long, and 1-1.2 inches wide. When young colors of the cones are brown to dark purple, as they mature they turn blue-black to black-brown.

== Root system ==
Forms surface root systems because of the moist soils. When soils are very saturated the roots form a well developed tap root.

== Threats ==
There have been no threats to this species. Old growth stands see the most pressure from logging in parts outside of Japan.
