= Turbinellus flabellatus =

Scientific classification
- Kingdom: Fungi
- Division: Basidiomycota
- Class: Agaricomycetes
- Order: Gomphales
- Family: Gomphaceae
- Genus: Turbinellus
- Species: T. flabellatus

Binomial name
- Turbinellus flabellatus (Berk.) Giachini, 2011

Synonyms
- Cantharellus flabellatus Berk., 1878; Gomphus flabellatus (Berk.) Corner, 1966; Merulius flabellatus (Berk.) Kuntze, 1898

Species of fungus

Turbinellus flabellatus is a species of fungus in the family Gomphaceae. To date, this species has only been recorded from Japan.
