= Gomphus brunneus =

Scientific classification
- Domain: Eukaryota
- Kingdom: Fungi
- Division: Basidiomycota
- Class: Agaricomycetes
- Order: Gomphales
- Family: Gomphaceae
- Genus: Gomphus
- Species: G. brunneus

Binomial name
- Gomphus brunneus (Heinem.) Corner

Synonyms
- Neurophyllum brunneum Heinem., 1958

Species of fungus

Gomphus brunneus is a species of fungus in the genus Gomphus, family Gomphaceae. It has been recorded from rainforest in the Yucatan Peninsula in Mexico, as well as Uganda and Democratic Republic of Congo in Africa.
