= Gomphus crassipes =

Scientific classification
- Kingdom: Fungi
- Division: Basidiomycota
- Class: Agaricomycetes
- Order: Gomphales
- Family: Gomphaceae
- Genus: Gomphus
- Species: G. crassipes

Binomial name
- Gomphus crassipes (L.M. Dufour) Maire

Synonyms
- Cantharellus crassipes L.M. Dufour, 1889

Species of fungus

Gomphus crassipes is a species of fungus in the genus Gomphus, family Gomphaceae. It is native to Spain and North Africa and possibly threatened by habitat loss.
