= Pseudocraterellus pseudoclavatus =

Scientific classification
- Kingdom: Fungi
- Division: Basidiomycota
- Class: Agaricomycetes
- Order: Cantharellales
- Family: Hydnaceae
- Genus: Pseudocraterellus
- Species: P. pseudoclavatus

Binomial name
- Pseudocraterellus pseudoclavatus (A.H. Sm.) R.H. Petersen

Synonyms
- Cantharellus pseudoclavatus A.H. Sm., 1947 Gomphus pseudoclavatus (A.H. Sm.) Corner, 1966

Species of fungus

Pseudocraterellus pseudoclavatus is a species of fungus in the family Cantharellaceae. Smith described it in 1947 as Cantharellus pseudoclavatus, from a collection of a mushroom from the Siskiyou Fork of the Smith River in northern California. He reported it occurred in Washtenaw and Oakland counties in Michigan in oak hickory forest but added that he had mistaken it for G. clavatus as the two were very similar in appearance and hence it could be more widespread. He placed it in the subgenus Gomphus.

It is distinguished from G. clavatus microscopically by its smooth, broadly ellipsoid spores, lack of clamp connections and reaction of the hymenium, gills and flesh of the cap to potassium hydroxide.
