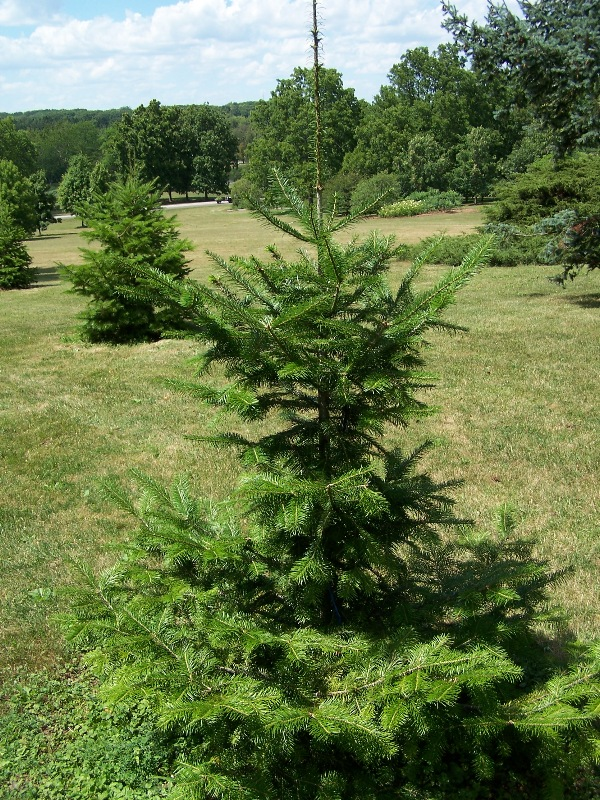
- Tree in Morton Arboretum

Conservation status
- Least Concern (IUCN 3.1)

Scientific classification
- Kingdom: Plantae
- Clade: Tracheophytes
- Clade: Gymnospermae
- Division: Pinophyta
- Class: Pinopsida
- Order: Pinales
- Family: Pinaceae
- Genus: Abies
- Species: A. nephrolepis

Binomial name
- Abies nephrolepis (Trautv. ex Maxim.) Maxim.

Synonyms
- Abies sibirica Korsh.; Abies sibirica var. nephrolepis Trautv.; Abies sibiriconephrolepis Taken. & J.J.Chien; Abies yoneyamae Soto; Pinus nephrolepis (Trautv.) Voss

= Abies nephrolepis =

Species of conifer

Abies nephrolepis, commonly known as Khingan fir, is a species of fir native to northeastern China (Hebei, Heilongjiang, Jilin, Liaoning, Shaanxi), North Korea, South Korea, and southeastern Russia (Amur Oblast, Jewish Autonomous Oblast, Primorsky Krai, southern Khabarovsk Krai).

It is a medium-sized evergreen coniferous tree growing to 30 m tall with a trunk up to 1.2 m diameter and a narrow conic to columnar crown. The bark is grey-brown, smooth on young trees, becoming fissured on old trees. The leaves are flat needle-like, 10–30 mm long and 1.5–2 mm broad, green above, and with two dull greenish-white stomatal bands below; they are spirally arranged, but twisted at the base to lie flattened either side of and forwards across the top of the shoots. The cones are 4.5–7 cm (rarely to 9.5 cm) long and 2–3 cm broad, green or purplish ripening grey-brown, and often very resinous; the tips of the bract scales are slightly exserted between the seed scales. Each seed scale bears two winged seeds, released when the cones disintegrate at maturity in the autumn.

It is closely related to Abies sachalinensis, Abies koreana, Abies veitchii, and Abies sibirica, which replace it to the east, south, southeast, and west respectively. The range abuts that of A. sibirica and hybrids occur where they meet; these have been named as Abies × sibirico-nephrolepis Taken. & J.J.Chien.

The wood from this tree was used for pulp production during the Japanese occupation of Korea in the 1920s.
