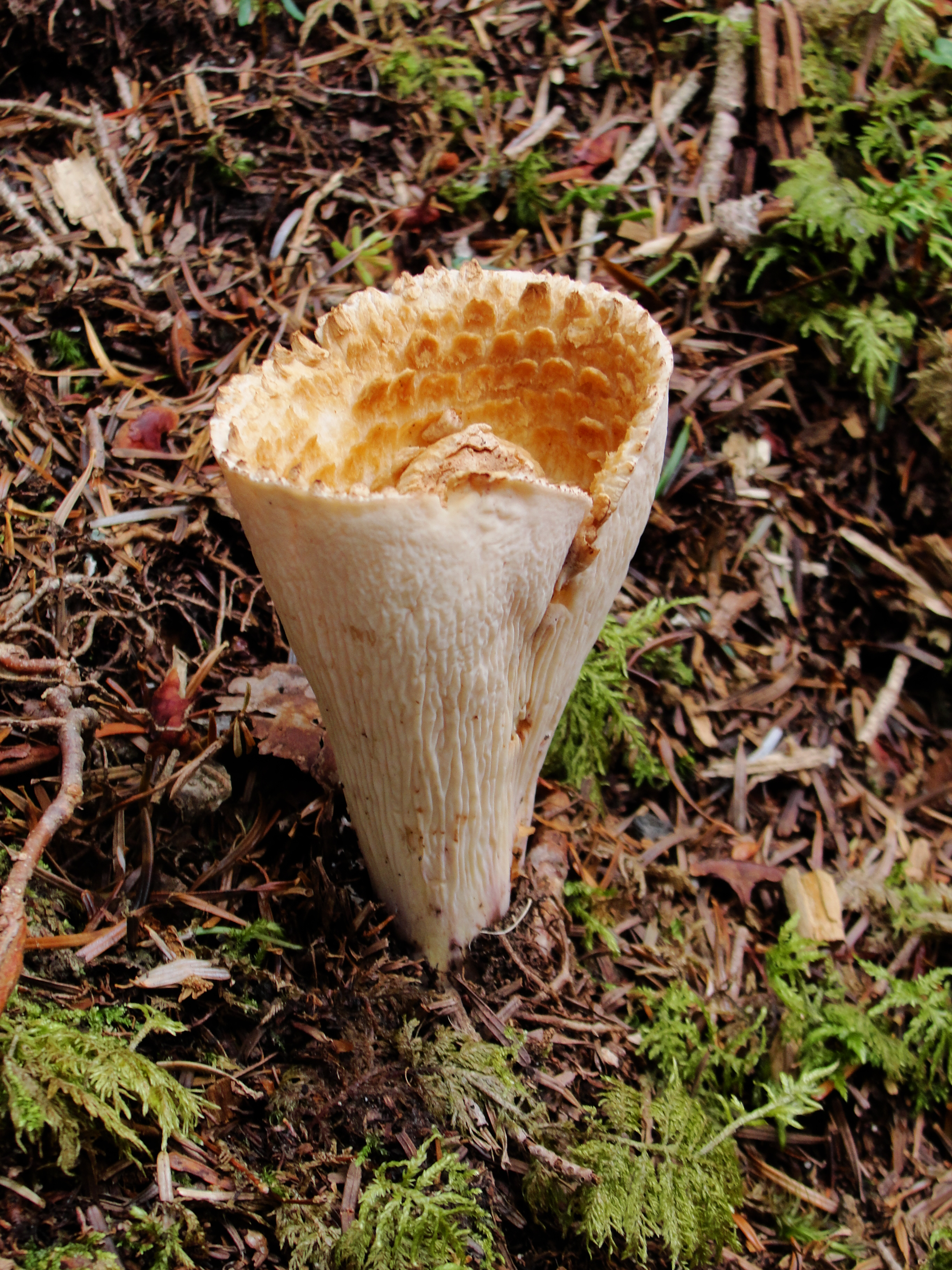
- On Mount Fuji, Japan

Scientific classification
- Domain: Eukaryota
- Kingdom: Fungi
- Division: Basidiomycota
- Class: Agaricomycetes
- Order: Gomphales
- Family: Gomphaceae
- Genus: Turbinellus
- Species: T. fujisanensis

Binomial name
- Turbinellus fujisanensis (S.Imai) Giachini (2011)

Synonyms
- Cantharellus fujisanensis S.Imai (1941); Neurophyllum fujisanense (S.Imai) S.Ito (1955); Gomphus fujisanensis (S.Imai) Parmasto (1965)

= Turbinellus fujisanensis =

Species of fungus

Turbinellus fujisanensis, previously known as Gomphus fujisanensis, is a mushroom in the family Gomphaceae. It was originally described in 1941 by Sanshi Imai as a species of Cantharellus. Admir Giachini transferred it to Turbinellus in 2011. The genus Gomphus, along with several others in the Gomphaceae, was reorganized in the 2010s after molecular analysis confirmed that the older morphology-based classification did not accurately represent phylogenetic relationships.
