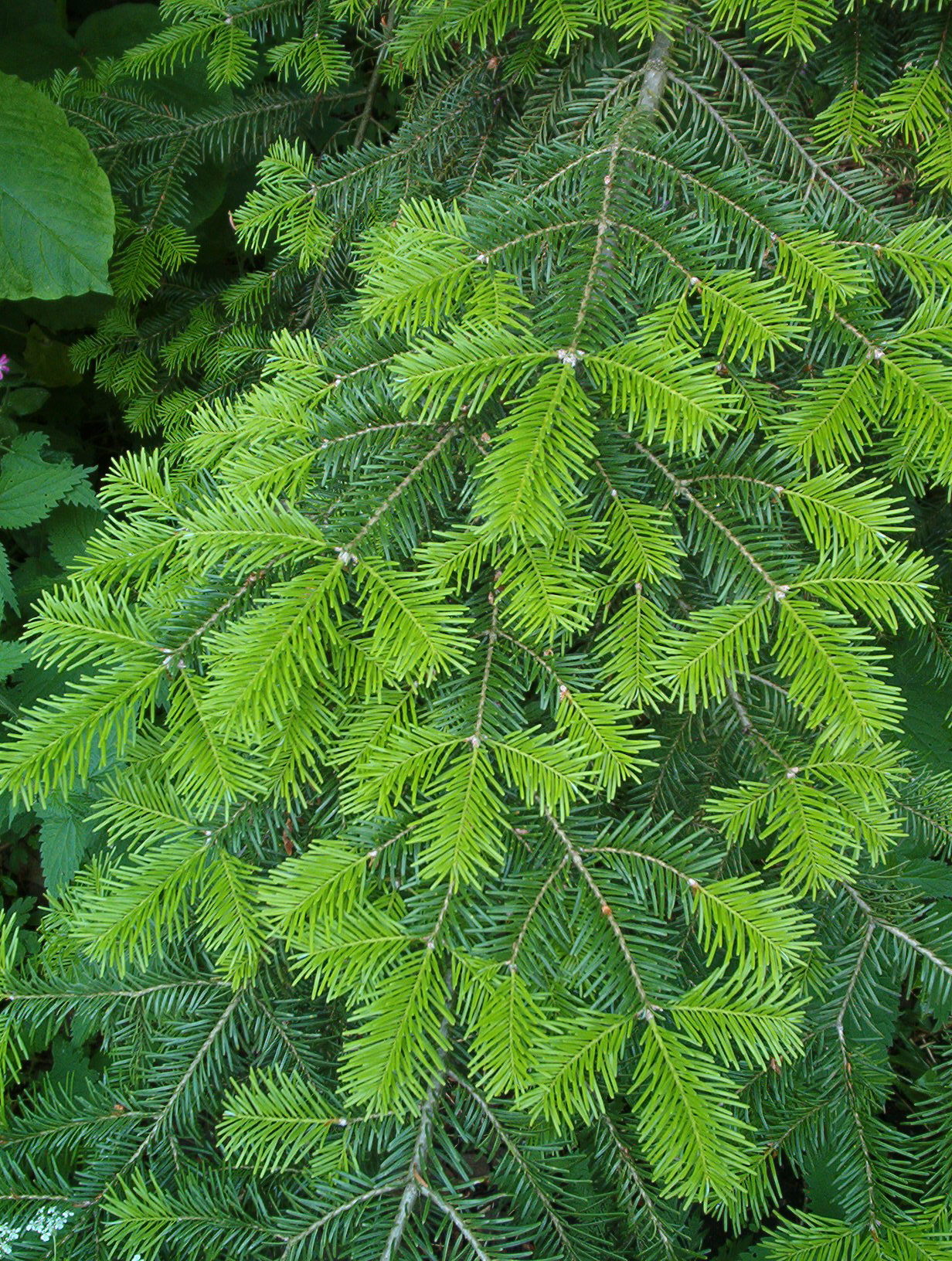
- Branch of Veitch's fir

Conservation status
- Least Concern (IUCN 3.1)

Scientific classification
- Kingdom: Plantae
- Clade: Tracheophytes
- Clade: Gymnospermae
- Division: Pinophyta
- Class: Pinopsida
- Order: Pinales
- Family: Pinaceae
- Genus: Abies
- Species: A. veitchii

Binomial name
- Abies veitchii Lindley

= Abies veitchii =

Veitch's fir

Species of conifer

Abies veitchii, also known as Veitch's fir or Veitch's silver-fir, is a species of fir native to Japan from the islands of Honshū and Shikoku. It lives in moist soils in cool wet mountain forests at elevations of 1500–2800 m. It is very shade-tolerant when young, but is not long-lived. The name is derived from John Gould Veitch, who saw the common species on Mount Fuji in 1860 and identified it for European botanists.

== Description ==
It is a coniferous evergreen tree growing at a fast rate to 25–30 m tall. The crown is narrowly conical with horizontal branches and pubescent shoots. The shoots are pubescent, with short brown hairs. The leaves are needle-like and flattened, 1–3 cm long and 2 mm broad. They are glossy dark green above with two conspicuous bluish white stomatal bands underneath, and the tips are notched. The foliage is dense and points forward along the shoot, with the inner leaves being shorter and more erect than the lower leaves. The cone is purple-brown, cylindrical, 4–7 cm long and tapers slightly. The cones are upright and have slightly exserted and reflexed yellow-green bracts. The bark is smooth and light grey, and has resin blisters characteristic of many firs.

There are two varieties:

- Abies veitchii var. veitchii. Endemic to Honshū; Shoots densely pubescent. Leaves 1.5–3 cm long; stomatal bands bluish white.
- Abies veitchii var. sikokiana (Nakai) Kusaka. Endemic to Shikoku; NT. Shoots thinly pubescent. Leaves 1–2 cm long; stomatal bands white. In many respects intermediate between var. veitchii and Abies koreana, it has been treated as a distinct species Abies sikokiana by some authors.

The wood is sturdy and elastic, and is used in construction, boxes, utensils, and spindles. Veitch's fir is a popular ornamental tree and is occasionally grown for Christmas trees.

== References and external links ==
- Liu, T. S. (1971). A Monograph of the genus Abies. National Taiwan University.
- Coombes, J. Allen (1992). Eyewitness Handbooks: Trees. London & New York: Dorling Kindersley.
- Gymnosperm Database - Abies veitchii
- Abies veitchii - UConn Plant Database
- Abies veitchii - Plants For A Future database report
- Conifers Around the World: Abies veitchii - Veitch Fir.
