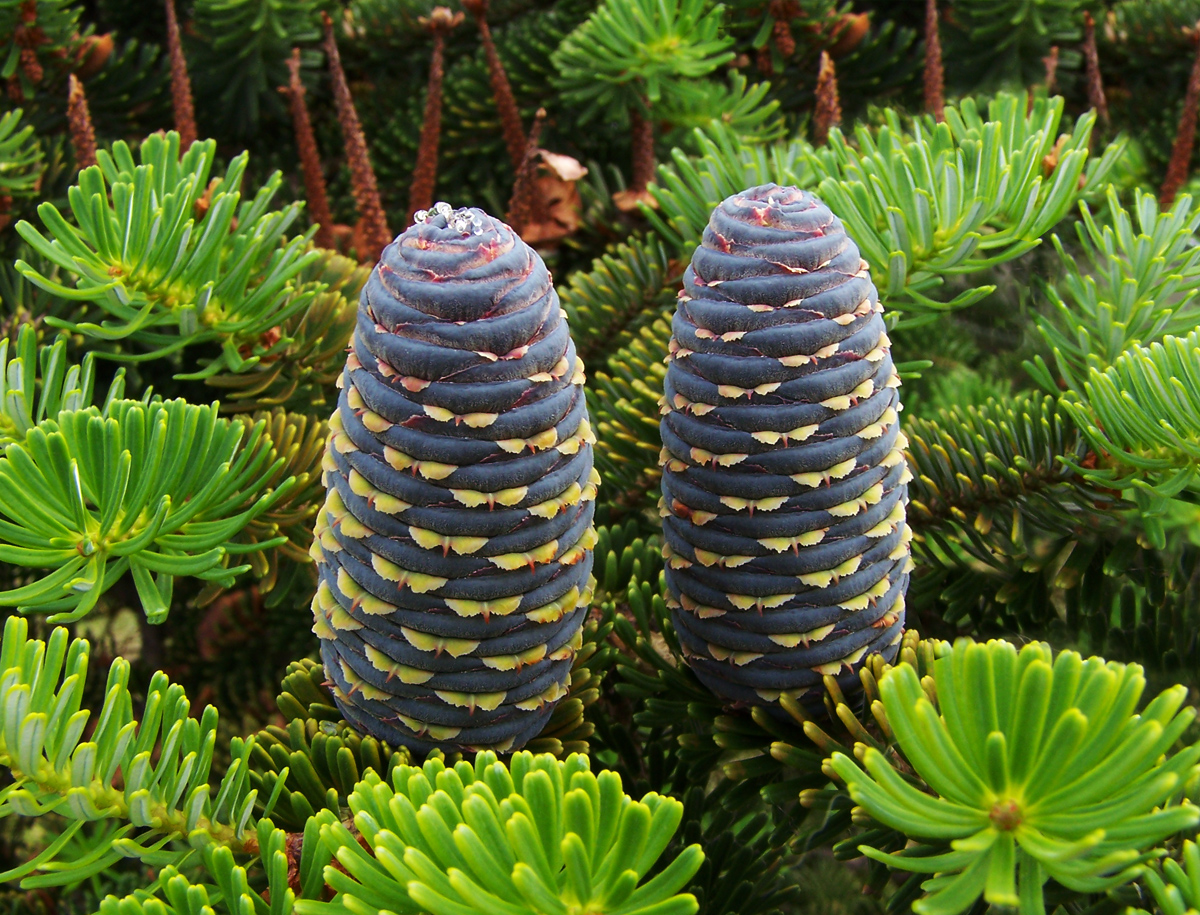

Conservation status
- Endangered (IUCN 3.1)

Scientific classification
- Kingdom: Plantae
- Clade: Embryophytes
- Clade: Tracheophytes
- Clade: Spermatophytes
- Clade: Gymnospermae
- Division: Pinophyta
- Class: Pinopsida
- Order: Pinales
- Family: Pinaceae
- Genus: Abies
- Species: A. koreana

Binomial name
- Abies koreana E.H. Wilson

= Abies koreana =

Korean fir

Species of plant (Korean fir)

Abies koreana (Korean: 구상나무, Gusang namu), the Korean fir, is a species of fir native to the higher mountains of South Korea, including Jeju Island. It grows at altitudes of 1,000–1,900 metres (3,300–6,200 ft) in temperate rainforest with high rainfall and cool, humid summers, and heavy winter snowfall.

== Description ==
It is a small to medium-sized evergreen coniferous tree growing to 10–18 m (33–59 ft) tall with a trunk diameter of up to 0.7 m (2 ft 4 in), smaller and sometimes shrubby at the tree line. The bark is smooth with resin blisters and grey-brown in colour. The leaves are needle-like, flattened, 1–2 centimetres (0.4–0.8 in) long and 2–2.5 millimetres (0.08–0.10 in) wide by 0.5 mm (0.02 in) thick, glossy dark green above, and with two broad, vividly white bands of stomata below, and slightly notched at the tip. The leaf arrangement is spiral on the shoot, but with each leaf variably twisted at the base so they lie mostly either side of and above the shoot, with fewer below the shoot. The shoots are green-grey at first, maturing pinkish-grey, with scattered fine pubescence. The cones are 4–7 cm (1.6–2.8 in) long and 1.5–2 cm (0.6–0.8 in) broad, dark purple-blue before maturity; the scale bracts are long, green or yellow, and emerge between the scales in the closed cone. The winged seeds are released when the cones disintegrate at maturity about 5–6 months after pollination.

== Cultivation ==
Korean fir is a very popular ornamental plant in parks and gardens in temperate climates, grown for its foliage but also for the abundant cone production even on young trees only 1–2 m (3 ft 3 in – 6 ft 7 in) tall. The following have gained the Royal Horticultural Society's Award of Garden Merit:

- A. koreana (≥ 12 m)
- A. koreana "Cis" (0.5–1 m)
- A. koreana "Kohout's Ice Breaker" (0.5–1 m)
- A. koreana "Silberlocke" (2.5–4 m)

== Habitat ==
Biggest group of wild Korean fir grows in Hallasan Mountain in Jeju Island, South Korea.

== Use ==
Korean fir is also used as a Christmas tree.

== Gallery ==
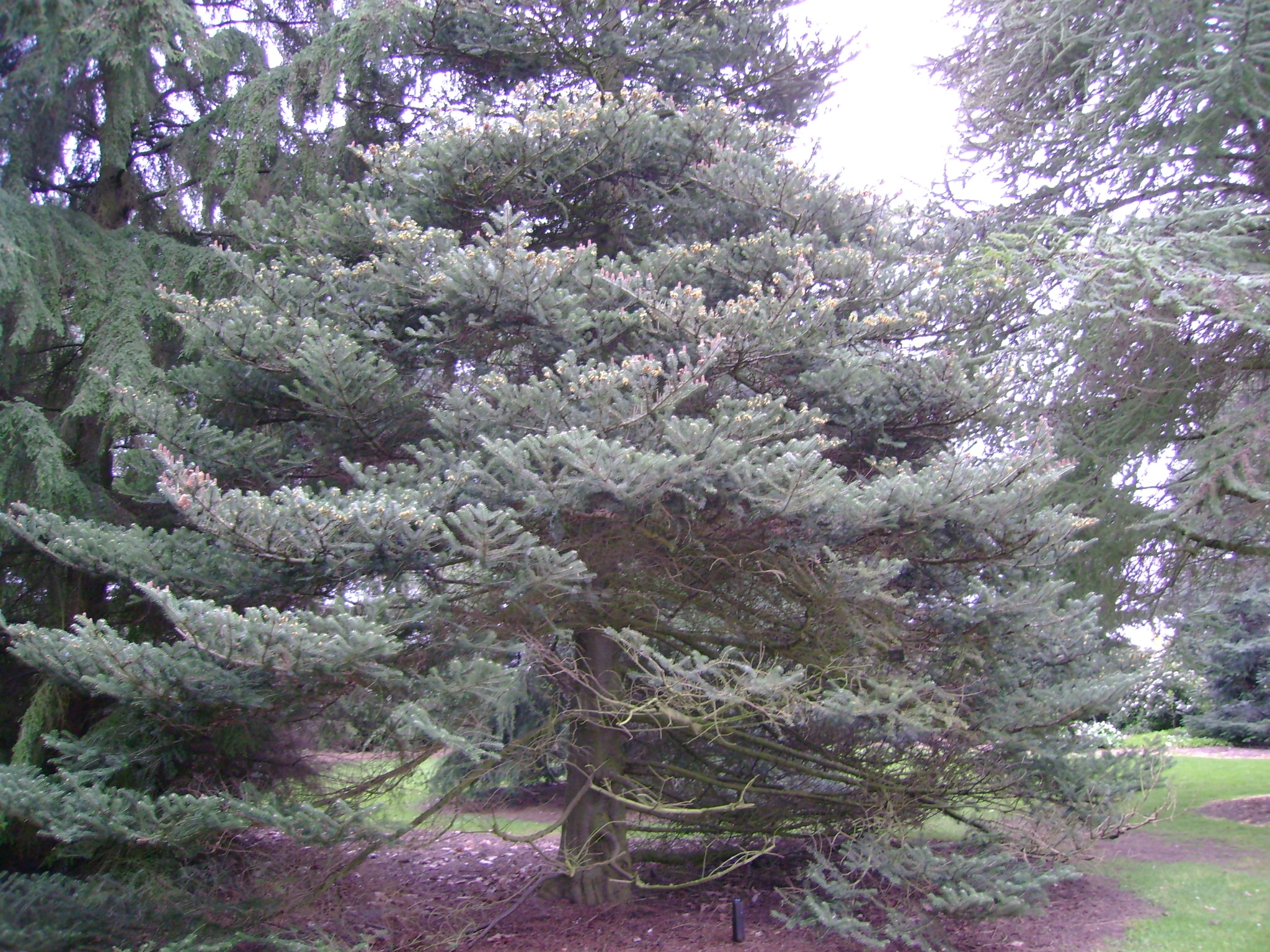

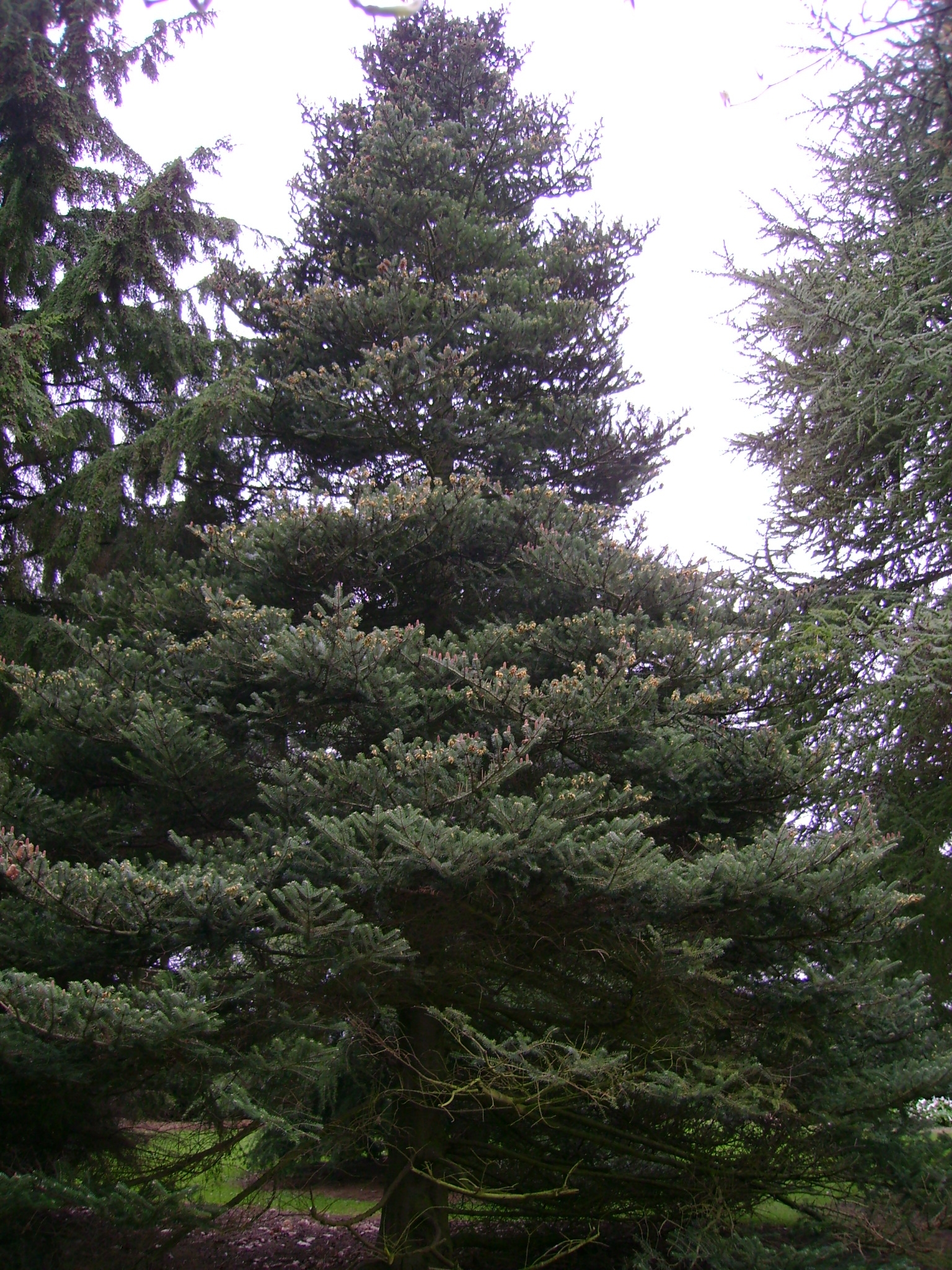

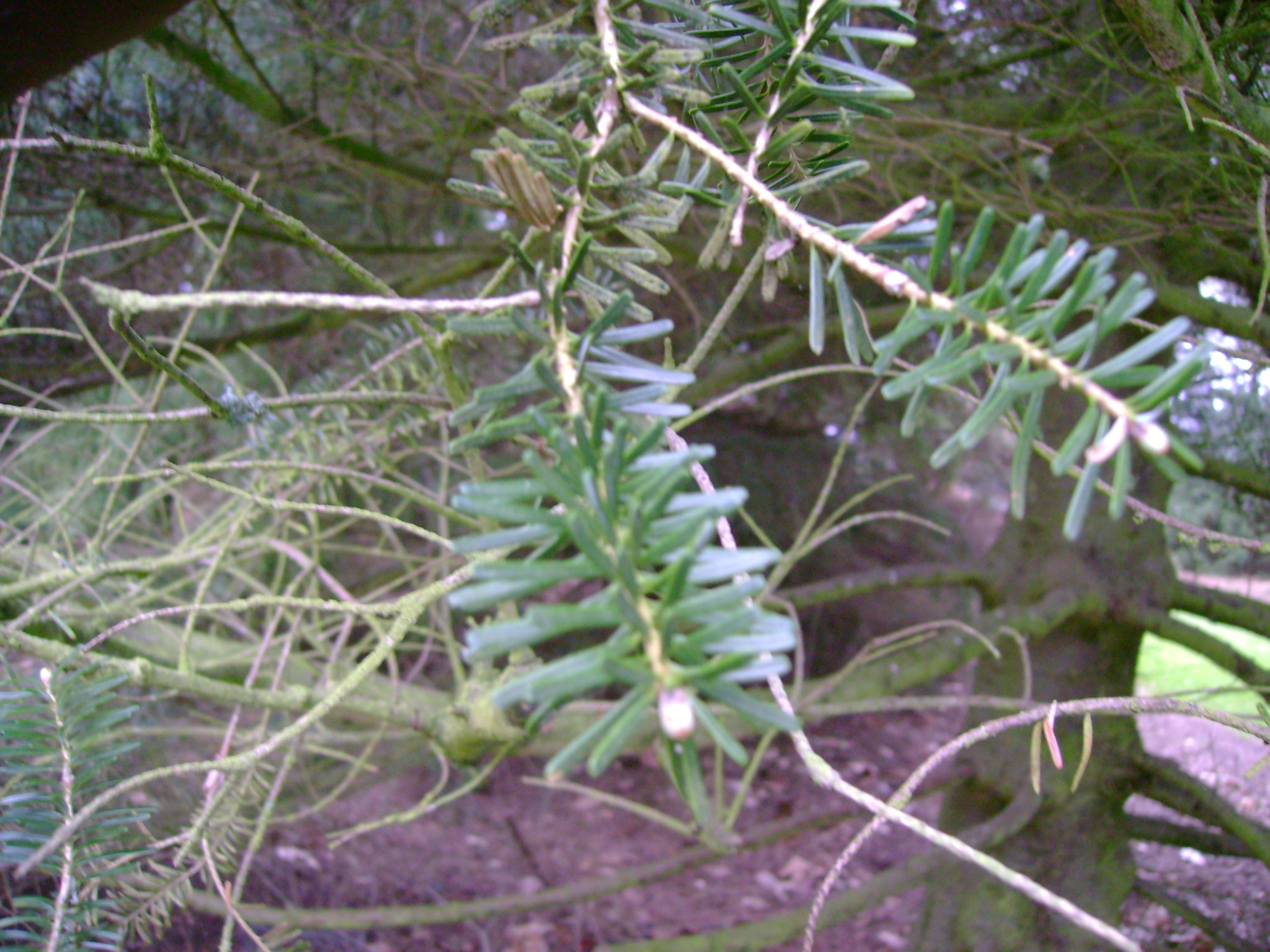
Leaves

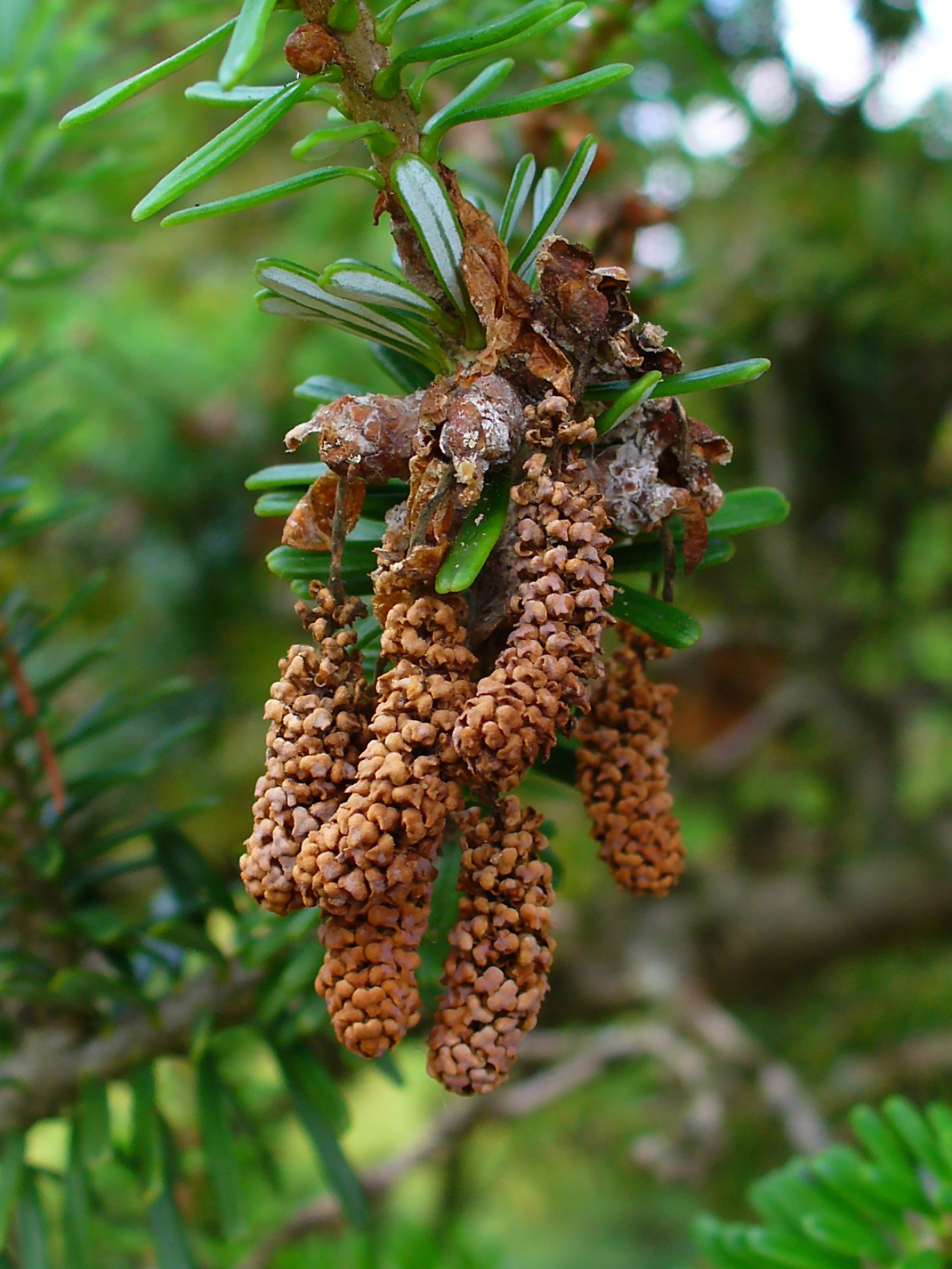
Male cones

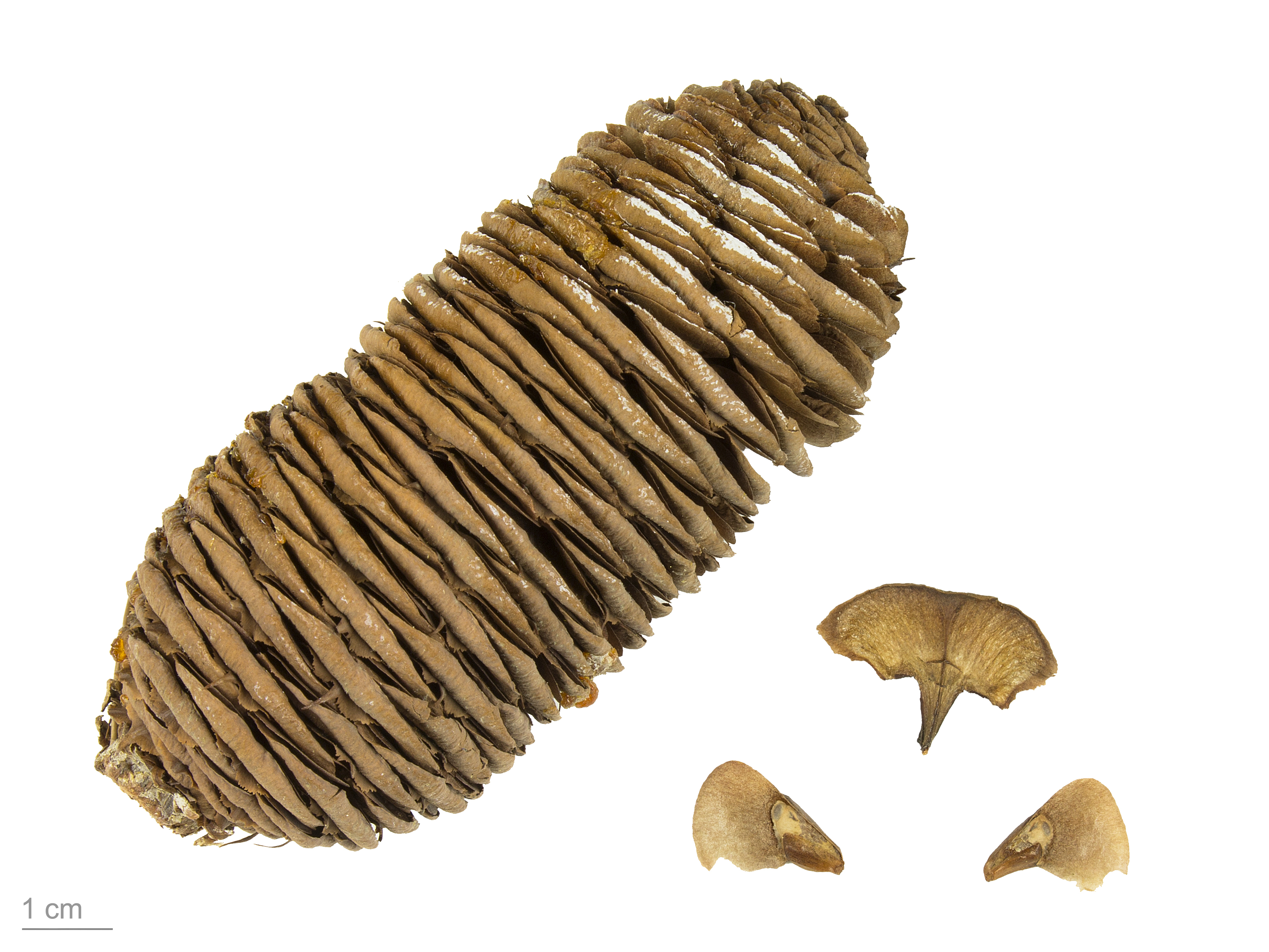
Cone and seeds

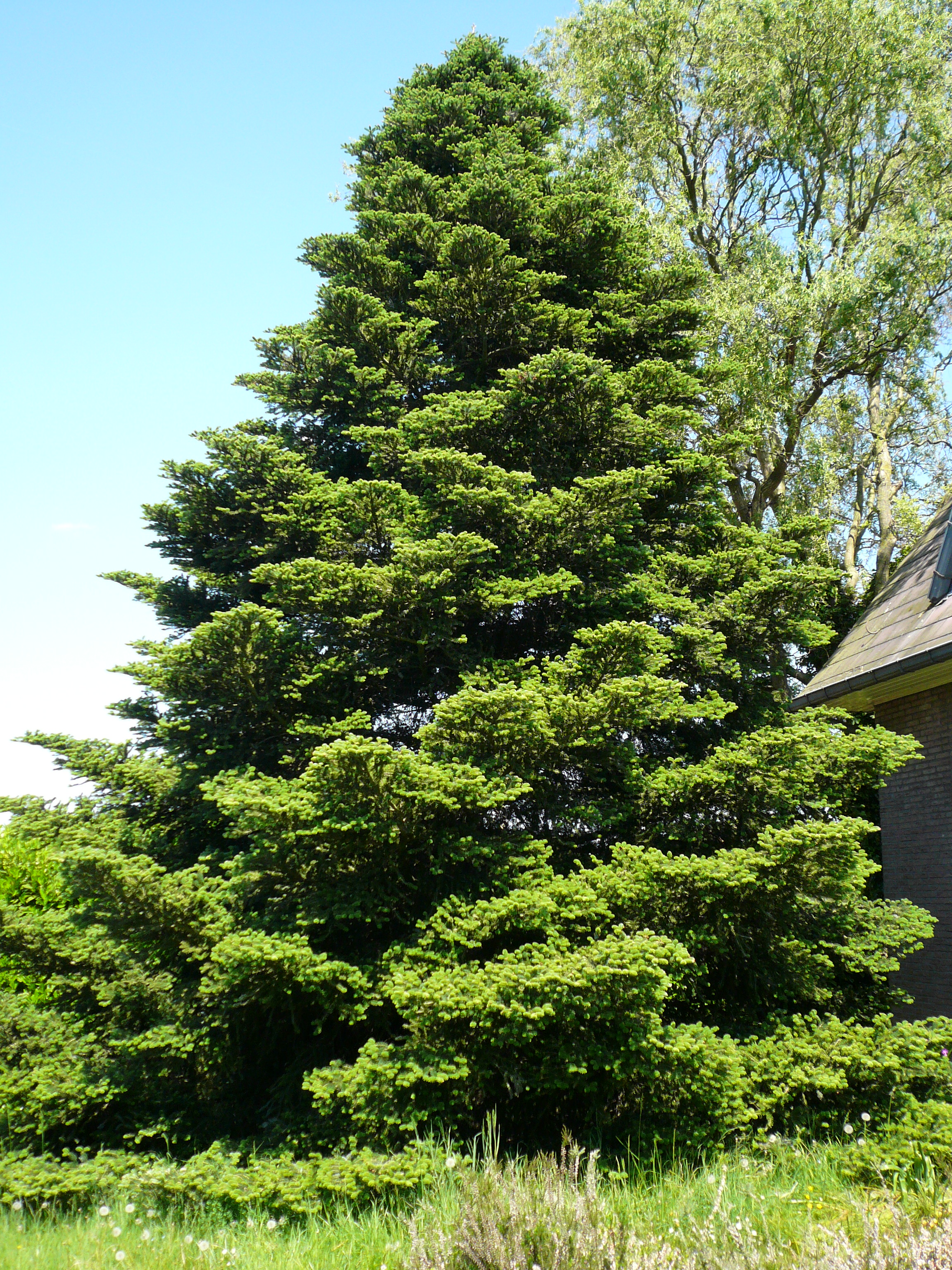
In cultivation

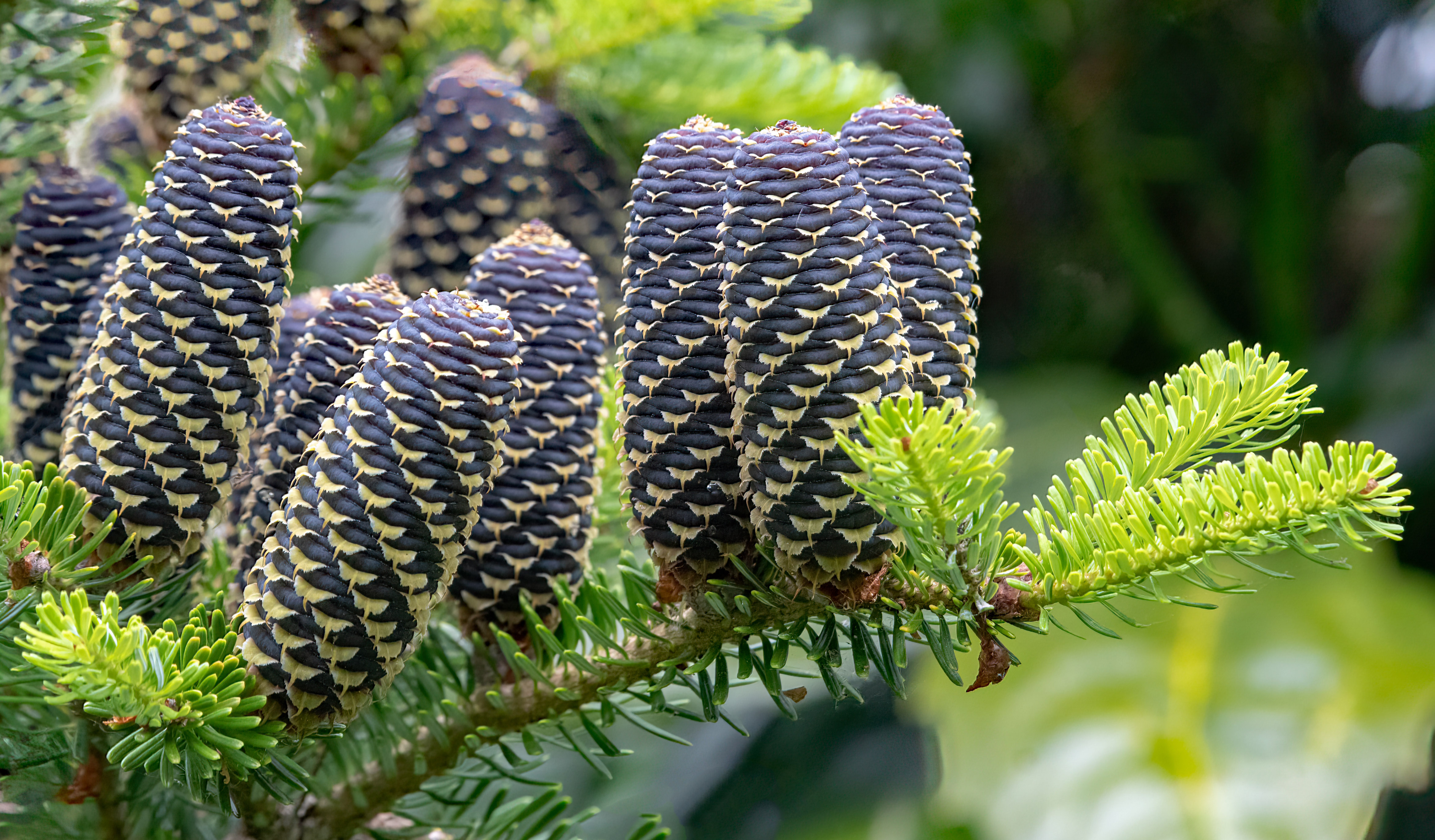
"ABIES KOREANA" Korean fir

== Bibliography ==
- Liu, T. S. (1971), A Monograph of the Genus Abies, National Taiwan University.
