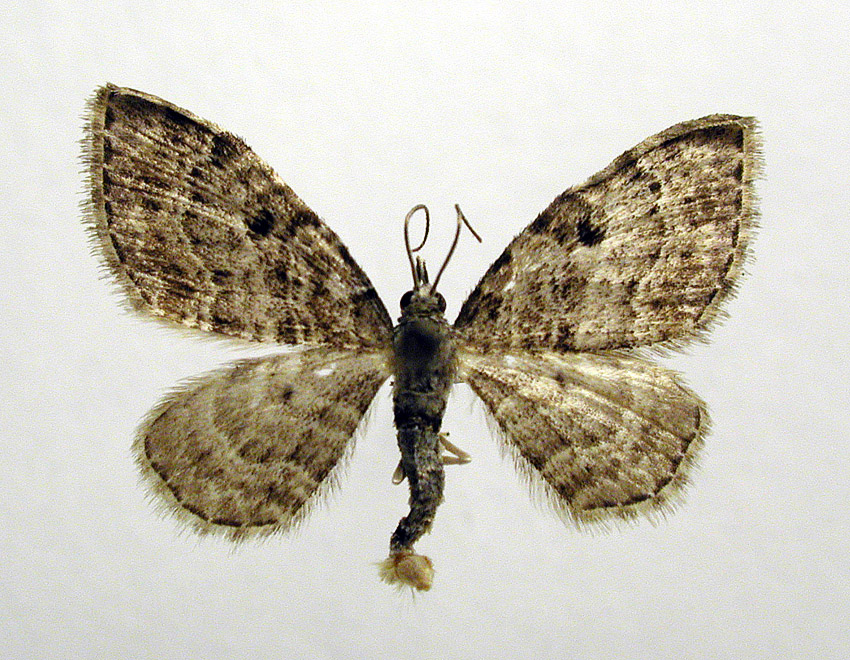

Scientific classification
- Domain: Eukaryota
- Kingdom: Animalia
- Phylum: Arthropoda
- Class: Insecta
- Order: Lepidoptera
- Family: Geometridae
- Genus: Eupithecia
- Species: E. analoga

Binomial name
- Eupithecia analoga Diakonoff, 1926

Synonyms
- Eupithecia europaea Lempke, 1969; Tephroclystia nageli Skala, 1929

= Eupithecia analoga =

Species of moth

Eupithecia analoga is a moth of the family Geometridae. The species can be found from western Europe to the Ural and Siberia. In the north, the range extends north of the polar circle. South, it is found up to the Alps.

The wingspan is 17–21 mm. There is one generation per year with adults on wing from the beginning of May to mid July.

== Subspecies ==
- Eupithecia analoga analoga
- Eupithecia analoga nageli (Skala, 1929)
