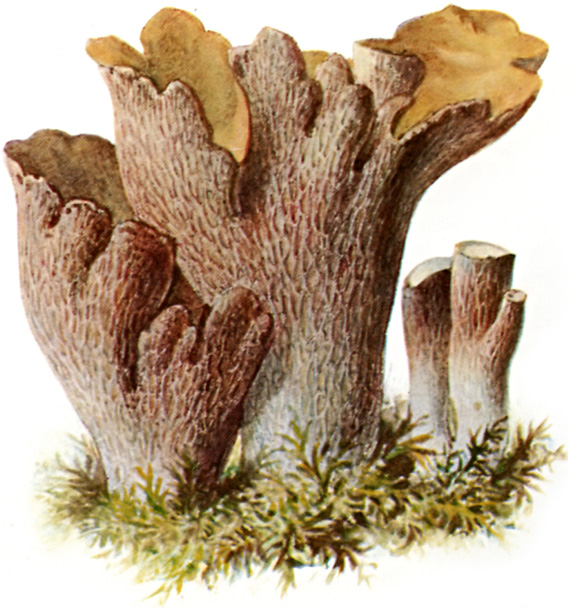
- Gomphus clavatus Albin Schmalfuß, 1897

Scientific classification
- Kingdom: Fungi
- Division: Basidiomycota
- Class: Agaricomycetes
- Order: Gomphales
- Family: Gomphaceae
- Genus: Gomphus; Pers. (1794)

Type species
- Gomphus clavatus (Pers.) Gray (1821)

Species
- See text

= Gomphus (fungus) =

Genus of fungi

Gomphus is a genus of cantharelloid fungi in the family Gomphaceae. Once presumed to be related to chanterelles, molecular study has shown them to be allied with stinkhorns and fairy clubs. The type species of the genus is the pig's ear (G. clavatus).

Christiaan Hendrik Persoon named the genus in 1797, but did not assign any species to it at the time. The generic name is derived from the Greek 'γομφος' gomphos meaning 'plug' or 'large wedge-shaped nail'.

== Species ==
As of September 2023, Index Fungorum accepts 12 species of Gomphus:

Image	Name	Taxon Author	Year	Distribution
	Gomphus brasiliensis	Corner	1970	South America
	Gomphus brunneus	(Heinem.) Corner	1966	Mexico
	Gomphus cavipes	Corner	1970	South America
	Gomphus clavatus	(Pers.) Gray	1821	Europe, North America
	Gomphus crassipes	(Kuntze) Maire	1937	Spain and North Africa
	Gomphus ludovicianus	R.H. Petersen, Justice & D.P. Lewis	2014	southeastern United States
	Gomphus megasporus	Corner	1970	Pakistan
	Gomphus ochraceus	(Pat.) Singer	1945	
	Gomphus orientalis	R.H. Petersen & M. Zang	1996	China
	Gomphus szechwanensis	R.H. Petersen	1972	Tibet
	Gomphus thiersii	R.H. Petersen	1971	USA
	Gomphus yunnanensis	R.H. Petersen & M. Zang	1996	China

There are several undescribed species in the forests of myrtle beech (Nothofagus cunninghamii) in Tasmania. Bruce Fuhrer noticed in 1992 that the large and ornamented spores of these species resembled those of the genera Ramaria and Beenakia.
