= List of cotton diseases =

This article is a list of diseases of cotton (Gossypium spp.).

== Bacterial ==
Bacterial diseases
Bacterial blight of cotton	Xanthomonas citri subsp. malvacearum
Crown gall	Agrobacterium tumefaciens
Lint degradation	Erwinia herbicola = Pantoea agglomerans

Xanthomonas citri

Inner boll rot - Pantoea dispersa

== Fungal ==
Fungal diseases
Anthracnose	Glomerella gossypii Colletotrichum gossypii [anamorph]
Areolate mildew	Ramularia gossypii = Cercosporella gossypii Mycosphaerella areola [teleomorph]
Anita blight Anita stalk borer	Ascochyta gossypii
Black root rot	Thielaviopsis basicola Chalara elegans [synanamorph]
Boll rot	Ascochyta gossypii Colletotrichum gossypii Glomerella gossypii [teleomorph] Fusarium spp. Lasiodiplodia theobromae = Diplodia gossypina Botryosphaeria rhodina [teleomorph] = Physalospora rhodina Phytophthora spp. Rhizoctonia solani
Charcoal rot	Macrophomina phaseolina
Escobilla	Colletotrichum gossypii Glomerella gossypii [teleomorph]
Fusarium wilt	Fusarium oxysporum f.sp. vasinfectum
Leaf spot	Alternaria macrospora Alternaria alternata Cercospora gossypina Mycosphaerella gossypina [teleomorph] Cochliobolus spicifer Bipolaris spicifera [anamorph] = Curvularia spicifera = Cochliobolus spicifer Myrothecium roridum Rhizoctonia solani Stemphylium solani
Lint contamination	Aspergillus flavus Nematospora spp. Nigrospora oryzae
Phymatotrichum root rot = cotton root rot	Phymatotrichopsis omnivora = Phymatotrichum omnivorum
Powdery mildew	Leveillula taurica Oidiopsis sicula [anamorph] = Oidiopsis gossypii Salmonia malachrae
Stigmatomycosis	Ashbya gossypii Eremothecium coryli = Nematospora coryli Aureobasidium pullulans
Rust
Cotton rust	Puccinia schedonnardii
Southwestern cotton rust	Puccinia cacabata
Tropical cotton rust	Phakopsora gossypii
...
Sclerotium stem and root rot = southern blight	Sclerotium rolfsii Athelia rolfsii [teleomorph]
Seedling disease complex	Colletotrichum gossypii Fusarium spp. Pythium spp. Rhizoctonia solani Thanatephorus cucumeris [teleomorph] Thielaviopsis basicola Chalara elegans [synanamorph]
Stem canker	Phoma exigua
Verticillium wilt	Verticillium dahliae

== Parastic ==
Nematodes, parasitic
Lance, Columbia nematode	Hoplolaimus columbus
Reniform nematode	Rotylenchulus reniformis
Root-knot nematode	Meloidogyne incognita
Sting nematode	Belonolaimus longicaudatus

== Viral ==
This list also contains uncharacterized graft transmissible pathogens.

Viral diseases
Abutilon mosaic = Malvaceous chlorosis virus*	Suspect Begomovirus (Bemisia tabaci transmitted)
Anthocyanosis	Suspect virus
Blue disease	Suspect virus or phytoplasma
Leaf crumple	Genus Bigeminivirus, cotton leaf curl virus (CLCuV)
Leaf curl	Genus Bigeminivirus, cotton leaf curl virus (CLCuV)
Leaf mottle	Suspect virus (etiology unknown)
Leaf roll	Suspect virus (etiology unknown)
Mosaic	Suspect virus (etiology unknown)
Psylosis	Suspect virus (etiology unknown)
Terminal stunt	Suspect virus (GTP; Cicadellidae associated)

== Phytoplasmal ==
Phytoplasmal and spiroplasmal diseases
Phyllody	Suspect phytoplasma
Small leaf	Suspect phytoplasma
