= Hoplolaimus galeatus =

Crown-headed lance nematode

Scientific classification
- Kingdom: Animalia
- Phylum: Nematoda
- Class: Secernentea
- Order: Tylenchida
- Family: Hoplolaimidae
- Genus: Hoplolaimus
- Species: H. galeatus

Binomial name
- Hoplolaimus galeatus (Cobb, 1913) Thorne, 1935

Synonyms
- Nemonchus galeatus Hoplolaimus coronatus Hoplolaimus tylenchiformis

Species of nematode

Hoplolaimus galeatus (Crown-headed lance nematode) is a plant pathogenic nematode.

== History ==
Hoplolaimus galeatus was discovered by Nathan Cobb in 1913, originally named Nemochus galeatus. In 1935 Nemochus galeatus was reclassified as Hoplolaimus galeatus and described, in detail, by Thorne.

== Distribution ==
H. galeatus Can be found worldwide in North America, Sumatra, Central and South America, India and Tanzania. In the United States H. galeatus has been reported along the east coast, along the Mississippi river, Colorado and Southern California.

== Morphology ==
H. galeatus is described as being a relatively large nematode (1.1–15.mm) with a large heavily defined cephalic framework, including a large stylet with tulip shaped knobs. The nematode has a cuticle with 4–6 layers. The lips are offset with 4–5 annules, which are divided into tile-like structures. The nematodes body is slightly curved when relaxed. Females have two ovaries which overlap the spermatheca. The vulva is found near the center of the body and the rectum near the tip of the tail. Males are smaller than the female, have an arcuate spicules, gubernaculum with titillate and a broad striated bursa.

== Life cycle and reproduction ==
Not much is known with regards to the lifecycle of H. galeatus.

== Host parasite relationship ==
H. galeatus has a very wide host range. While it is most important on turfgrass, it is known to infect; alfalfa, apple, beans, bananas, cabbage, chrysanthemums, clover, corn, cotton, oak, peanuts, peas, pine, sweet potatoes, sycamore, and wheat. H. galeatus is a migratory endoparasitic nematode but can also be found feeding semi-endoparasitically. Due to the migratory nature of the nematode, large necrotic lesions form in the plants root system as the nematode moves and feeds.

== Management ==
Chemical treatments are not as effective on H. galeatus as they are on other nematodes. Pre-planting dips may be an effective way to ensure that turf being planted does not carry over nematodes to the planting site. There are also many cultural practices that can reduce or prevent the population of H. galeatus. Some of these practices include; adequate watering, limiting activity on the turf, making certain the soil is aerated, applying fertilizers and avoidance of shaded areas when planting.

== See also ==
- List of soybean diseases
- Hoplolaimus magnistylus
- Hoplolaimus columbus
