= Scutellonema cavenessi =

Scientific classification
- Kingdom: Animalia
- Phylum: Nematoda
- Class: Secernentea
- Order: Tylenchida
- Family: Hoplolaimidae
- Genus: Scutellonema
- Species: S. cavenessi

Binomial name
- Scutellonema cavenessi Sher, 1963

Species of roundworm

Scutellonema cavenessi is a plant pathogenic nematode.

== Description ==
The species is very similar physically to S. bradys, and was grouped into the S. bradys complex by Baujard & Martiny (1995). Compared to S. bradys, S. cavenessi has a more C-shaped habitus, smaller submedian lips, longer epiptygmata, less-developed glands, and lobe-shaped bursa.

== Bibliography ==
- Kolombia, Yao A.; Karssen, Gerrit; Viaene, Nicole; Kumar, P. Lava; Joos, Lisa; Coyne, Danny L.; Bert, Wim (2017). "Morphological and molecular characterisation of Scutellonema species from yam (Dioscorea spp.) and a key to the species of the genus". Nematology. 19: 751–787. doi:10.1163/15685411-00003084. PMC 7340491.
