= Rotylenchus =

Scientific classification
- Domain: Eukaryota
- Kingdom: Animalia
- Phylum: Nematoda
- Class: Secernentea
- Order: Tylenchida
- Family: Hoplolaimidae
- Genus: Rotylenchus; Filipjev, 1934

Genus of roundworms

Rotylenchus is a genus of nematodes belonging to the family Hoplolaimidae.

The genus has almost cosmopolitan distribution.

Species:

- Rotylenchus abnormecaudatus Van den Berg & Heyns, 1974
- Rotylenchus acuspicaudatus Van den Berg & Heyns, 1974
- Rotylenchus agnetis Szcygiel, 1968
- Rotylenchus alii Maqbool & Shahina, 1986
- Rotylenchus alius Van den Berg, 1986
- Rotylenchus alpinus Eroshenko, 1976
- Rotylenchus aqualamus Van den Berg, Marais & Tiedt, 2007
- Rotylenchus aquaticus Germani & Massese, 2002
- Rotylenchus arasbaranensis Atighi, Pourjam, Ghaemi, Pedram, Liébanas, Cantalapiedra-Navarrete, Castillo & Palomares-Rius, 2014
- Rotylenchus ascalpi Massèse & Germani, 2000
- Rotylenchus bialaebursus Van den Berg & Heyns, 1974
- Rotylenchus blothrotylus (Baldwin & Bell, 1981)
- Rotylenchus brevicaudatus Colbran, 1962
- Rotylenchus breviglans Sher, 1965
- Rotylenchus buxophilus (Golden, 1956)
- Rotylenchus capensis Van den Berg & Heyns, 1974
- Rotylenchus capitatus (Eroshenko, 1981)
- Rotylenchus capsicumi Firoza & Maqbool, 1991
- Rotylenchus castilloi Talezari, Pourjam, Kheiri, Liébanas, Aliramaji, Pedram, Rezaee & Atighi, 2015
- Rotylenchus catbarinae Van den Berg & Heyns, 1974
- Rotylenchus catharinae Van den Berg & Heyns, 1974
- Rotylenchus caudaphasmidius Sher, 1965
- Rotylenchus cazorlaensis Castillo & Gomez, 1989
- Rotylenchus colbrani Brzeski & Choi, 1998
- Rotylenchus conicaudatus Atighi, Pourjam, Pedram, Cantalapiedra-Navarrete, Palomares-Rius & Castillo, 2011
- Rotylenchus corsicus Massèse & Germani, 2000
- Rotylenchus cretensis Tzortzakakis, Archidona-Yuste, Liébanas, Birmpilis, Cantalapiedra-Navarrete, Navas-Cortés, Castillo & Palomares-Rius, 2016
- Rotylenchus cypriensis Antoniou, 1980
- Rotylenchus dalhousiensis Sultan & Jairajpuri, 1979
- Rotylenchus dalikhaniensis Aliramaji, Pourjam, Álvarez-Ortega, Pedram & Atighi, 2015
- Rotylenchus echelimae Massèse & Germani, 2000
- Rotylenchus eximius Siddiqi, 1964
- Rotylenchus fallorobustus Sher, 1965
- Rotylenchus fragaricus Maqbool & Shahina, 1986
- Rotylenchus glabratus Kankina & Teben'kova, 1980
- Rotylenchus goodeyi Loof & Oostenbrink, 1958
- Rotylenchus graecus Vovlas & Troccoli, 1996
- Rotylenchus helenae Germani & Massese, 2002
- Rotylenchus hopperi (Baldwin & Bell, 1984)
- Rotylenchus incognitus Germani & Massese, 2002
- Rotylenchus incultus Sher, 1965
- Rotylenchus indorobustus Jairajpuri & Baqri, 1973
- Rotylenchus iranicus Atighi, Pourjam, Pedram, Cantalapiedra-Navarrete, Palomares-Rius & Castillo, 2011
- Rotylenchus ivanovae Kankina & Teben'kova, 1980
- Rotylenchus jagatpurensis Sultan, 1984
- Rotylenchus karooensis Van den Berg, 1986
- Rotylenchus kenti Van den Berg, 1989
- Rotylenchus landii Germani & Massese, 2002
- Rotylenchus laurentinus Scognamiglio & Talame, 1973
- Rotylenchus lobalus Sultan, 1984
- Rotylenchus lobatus Sultan, 1985
- Rotylenchus mabelei Van den Berg & De Waele, 1989
- Rotylenchus magnus Zancada, 1986
- Rotylenchus mesorobustus Zancada, 1986
- Rotylenchus microstriatus Siddiqi & Corbett, 1983
- Rotylenchus mirus Van den Berg, 1986
- Rotylenchus multicinctus Cobb
- Rotylenchus neorobustus Sultan & Jairajpuri, 1979
- Rotylenchus nexus Ferraz, 1980
- Rotylenchus obtusus (Bastian, 1865) Filipjev, 1936
- Rotylenchus orientalis Siddiqi & Husain, 1964
- Rotylenchus ouensensis Boag Hooper, 1981
- Rotylenchus pakistanensis Maqbool & Shahina, 1986
- Rotylenchus pararobustus Schuurmans Stekhoven & Teunissen
- Rotylenchus phaliurus Siddiqi & Pinochet, 1979
- Rotylenchus pini Mamiya, 1968
- Rotylenchus provincialis Massèse & Germani, 2000
- Rotylenchus pumilis (Perry, 1959)
- Rotylenchus pumilus (Perry, 1959)
- Rotylenchus quartus (Andrássy, 1958)
- Rotylenchus ranapoi Darekar & Khan, 1982
- Rotylenchus rhomboides Nguyen, Trinh, Couvreur, Singh, Decraemer & Bert, 2019
- Rotylenchus robustus (de Man, 1876)
- Rotylenchus rugatocuticulatus Sher, 1965
- Rotylenchus sabarlyi Scotto la Massese & Germani, 1998
- Rotylenchus stasilinicus Sultan, 1984
- Rotylenchus triannulatus Van den Berg & Heyns, 1974
- Rotylenchus troncapitatus Scotto la Massese & Germani, 1998
- Rotylenchus uniformis (Thorne, 1949)
- Rotylenchus unisexus Sher, 1965
- Rotylenchus urmiaensis Noruzi, Asghari, Atiighi, Eskandari, Cantalapiedra-Navarrete, Archidona-Yuste, Liébanas, Castillo & Palomares-Rius, 2015
- Rotylenchus usitatus Van den Berg & Heyns, 1974
- Rotylenchus vitis Cantalapiedra-Navarrete, Liébanas, Archidona-Yuste, Palomares-Rius & Castillo, 2012
- Rotylenchus wallacei Nobbs, 1989
