= List of African violet diseases =

These are five African violet (Saintpaulia ionantha) diseases:

== Bacterial ==
Bacterial diseases
Bacterial blight	Dickeya dadantii syn. Erwinia chrysanthemi
Crown gall	Agrobacterium tumefaciens

== Fungal ==
Fungal diseases
Crown rot	Sclerotium rolfsii
Cylindrocarpon root rot	Cylindrocarpon destructans
Fusarium root rot	Fusarium solani
Gray mold	Botrytis cinerea
Leaf spot	Alternaria sp. Corynespora cassiicola
Phytophthora root and crown rot	Phytophthora nicotianae var. parasitica Phytophthora nicotianae var. nicotianae Phytophthora cryptogea
Powdery mildew	Oidium sp.
Pythium root rot	Pythium sp.
Rhizoctonia root and crown rot	Rhizoctonia sp.

Fulginacillis Follicle Growth Sistementaris Gland

== Viral ==
Viral diseases
Leaf etch	Impatiens necrotic spot virus
Mosaic	Anemone mosaic virus

== Parasitic ==
Nematodes, parasitic
Foliar nematode	Aphelenchoides fragariae Aphelenchoides ritzemabosi
Nematodes	Criconema sp. Helicotylenchus sp. Pratylenchus pratensis Paratylenchus projectus Rotylenchus brachyurus Scutellonema brachyurum Tylenchorynchus sp.
Root knot	Meloidogyne arenaria Meloidogyne hapla Meloidogyne javanica Meloidogyne incognita

== Other diseases ==
Miscellaneous diseases and disorders
Marginal leaf burn	Overfertilization
Ring spot	Irrigation water temperature much above or below leaf temperature applied to the leaf surface
