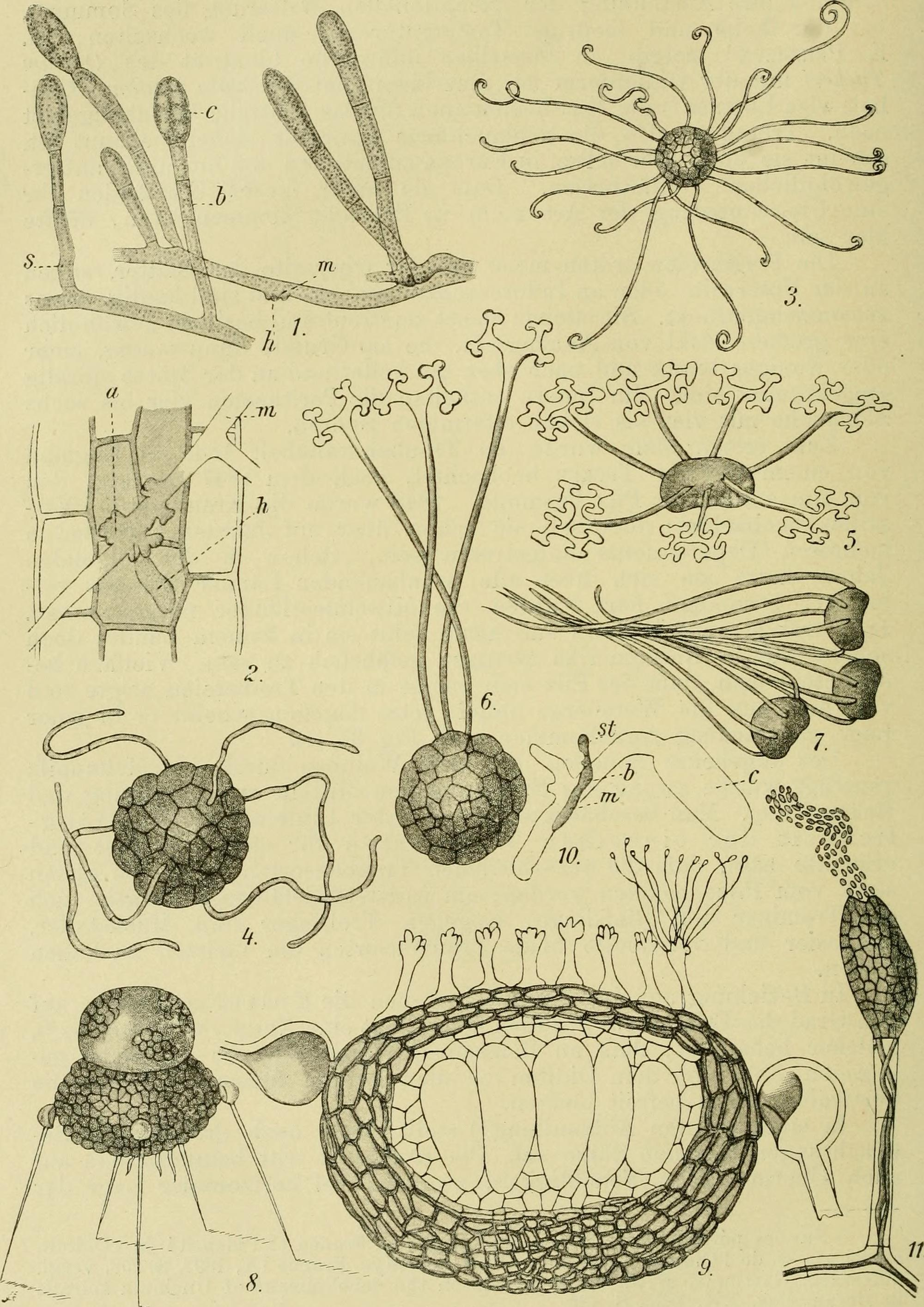
- Handbuch der Pflanzenkrankheiten (Paul Sorauer, 1908) - 10. Oidium with Cicinnobolus

Scientific classification
- Kingdom: Fungi
- Division: Ascomycota
- Class: Dothideomycetes
- Order: Pleosporales
- Family: Phaeosphaeriaceae
- Genus: Cicinnobolus; Ehrenb. (1853)

Type species
- Cicinnobolus modenensis Ehrenb. (1853)

Species
- Several, including: Cicinnobolus cotoneus Pass.; Cicinnobolus major Dearn. & Barthol., 1917

Synonyms
- Cicinobolus Ehrenb. (1853); Ampelomyces Ces. ex Schltdl., 1852; Byssocystis Riess, 1853

= Cicinnobolus =

Genus of fungi

Cicinnobolus is a genus of fungi, either classified as imperfect fungi or as Ascomycota. Species in this genus are hyperparasites of powdery mildew.

Cicinnobolus cesatii is a synonym for Ampelomyces quisqualis.
