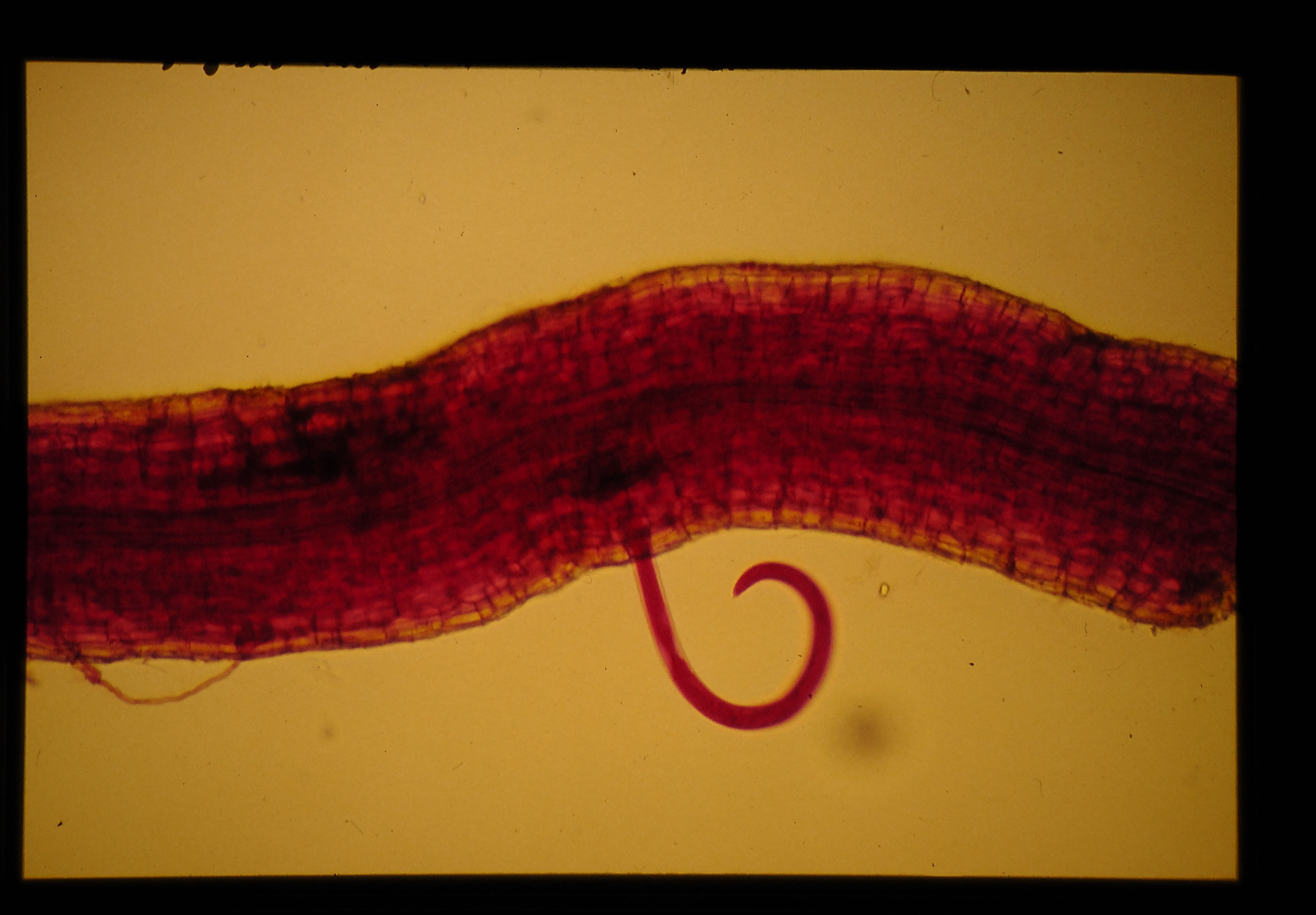

Scientific classification
- Kingdom: Animalia
- Phylum: Nematoda
- Class: Secernentea
- Order: Tylenchida
- Family: Hoplolaimidae
- Genus: Helicotylenchus
- Species: H. dihystera

Binomial name
- Helicotylenchus dihystera (Cobb, 1893) Sher, 1961

Synonyms
- Tylenchus dihystera Tylenchus olaae Tylenchus spiralis Aphelenchus dubius var. peruensis Helicotylenchus nannus Helicotylenchus crenatus Helicotylenchus punicae

= Helicotylenchus dihystera =

Steiner's spiral nematode

Species of nematode

Helicotylenchus dihystera (Steiner's spiral nematode) is a plant pathogenic nematode. It is known to inhabit sugarcane, rice, potatoes, corn, peanut, millet, sorghum, banana and forest trees.

== See also ==
- Sodium azide – used for agricultural control of Helicotylenchus dihystera
