= Rotylenchulus parvus =

Scientific classification
- Domain: Eukaryota
- Kingdom: Animalia
- Phylum: Nematoda
- Class: Secernentea
- Order: Tylenchida
- Family: Hoplolaimidae
- Genus: Rotylenchulus
- Species: R. parvus

Binomial name
- Rotylenchulus parvus Sher, (1961)

Species of roundworm

Rotylenchulus parvus is a plant pathogenic nematode infecting papaya.
