= Ibervillea macdougalii =

Conservation status
- Imperiled (NatureServe)

- Delisted (ESA)

Scientific classification
- Kingdom: Plantae
- Clade: Tracheophytes
- Clade: Angiosperms
- Clade: Eudicots
- Clade: Rosids
- Order: Cucurbitales
- Family: Cucurbitaceae
- Genus: Ibervillea
- Species: I. macdougalii

Binomial name
- Ibervillea macdougalii (Rose) Lira, Dávila & Legaspi (2015)

Synonyms
- Tumamoca macdougalii Rose (1912); Tumamoca mucronata Kearns (1994)

Species of flowering plant

Ibervillea macdougalii is a species of flowering plant of the Cucurbitaceae or gourd family. Also called the Tumamoc globeberry, it is native to the Sonoran Desert, and is found in Arizona, Baja California Norte, Sonora, and Zacatecas.

Ibervillea macdougalii is a monoecious vine climbing over various shrubs. Stems die in the fall, but tuberous roots generally persist through the winter. Leaves are deeply 3-lobed, nearly cleft, each lobe similarly divided into several sections. Flowers are pale yellow with narrow corolla lobes. Pistillate (female) flowers are solitary in the leaf axils; staminate (male) flowers in racemes of two to six flowers. Fruits are spherical, red, rarely yellow, about 10 mm (0.4 inches) in diameter.

The species was listed as endangered in the United States in 1986. It was delisted in 1993 when it proved to be more common than previously thought.

The species was first described as Tumamoca macdougalii by Joseph Nelson Rose in 1912. The genus was named for Tumamoc Hill just west of the City of Tucson, Arizona, where the University of Arizona maintains an ecological research station. The type specimen of T. macdougallii was collected near the station. In 2015 genus Tumamoca was merged into genus Ibervillea, and the species was renamed Ibervillea macdougalii.

== Uses ==
The Seri and Tohono O'odham eat the fruits of I. macdougalii.
