= Effie A. Southworth =

American botanist (1860–1947)

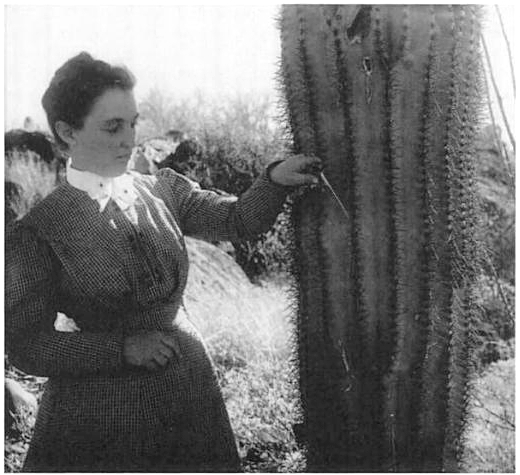
- Measuring a saguaro, 1909
- Born: October 29, 1860; North Collins, New York
- Died: 1947 (aged 87); Los Angeles, California
- Education: University of Southern California; University of Michigan
- Spouse: Volney Morgan Spalding
- Scientific career
- Fields: Botany, plant pathology
- Workplaces: U.S. Department of Agriculture; University of Southern California
- Author abbrev. (botany): Southw.

Effie Almira Southworth Spalding (1860–1947), was an American botanist and mycologist, and the first woman plant pathologist hired by the United States Department of Agriculture (USDA). Her most important discovery was the 1887 identification of the fungus Colletotrichum gossypii as the cause of cotton cankers, a disease which killed thousands of acres of cotton and was a major economic threat. She taught botany at several institutions, worked at the Desert Botanical Laboratory with her husband, and established the Botany Department Herbarium at the University of Southern California.

== Life ==
Effie Southworth was born in North Collins, New York, on October 29, 1860, to parents Chloe and Nathaniel Southworth. Southworth was well educated and through her college years she studied foreign languages, mathematics, zoology, chemistry, astronomy, physics, geology, botany, and physiology. She studied at Allegheny College for one year before transferring to the University of Michigan, where she earned a bachelor's degree in 1885. In 1895, she married botanist Volney Morgan Spalding, a professor at the University of Michigan. After her husband was diagnosed with tuberculosis, they moved from Arizona to California where he died in 1918. In 1922, at the age of 65, she received her master's degree in botany from University of Southern California. Southworth died in April 1947, in Los Angeles at the age of 87.

== Career ==
In 1885, Southworth became an instructor of botany at Bryn Mawr College. During her two years at the college, she also joined the botanical laboratory as a Fellow, worked on the anatomical structure of plants, and was able to understand the development of the fungus Asteroma. In 1887, she became known as the first female researcher to be hired by the Section of Mycology of the USDA. There, she worked as an assistant mycologist with Erwin F. Smith and Beverly T. Galloway and became involved in the study of fungal pathogens. As an assistant mycologist, she was responsible for preparing mycological publications on deceases that were causing a huge impact on the economy. In 1888, she began to study a decease that was destroying cotton farms. Three years later (1891), her major contribution to USDA was when she discovered that the fungus Colletotrichum gossypii was the reason why thousands of acres of cotton were being destroyed yearly. She left the USDA in 1892 to become an assistant in botany professor at Barnard College in New York. From 1905 to 1911 she worked as her husband's assistant at the Desert Botanical Laboratory of the Carnegie Institution of Washington in Tucson, Arizona. Southworth here focused more on desert plants than plant diseases. After her husband's death she joined the botany faculty of University of Southern California. There, she founded the Herbarium of the Department of Botany in 1922, which focused primarily on California spermatophytes. She is commemorated in the fungal genus Southworthia Ellis & Galloway, which is now a synonym for Myriangium floridanum Ellis & Galloway ex Rehm.
