= Tumamoc Hill =

Butte in the Tucson Mountains, Arizona

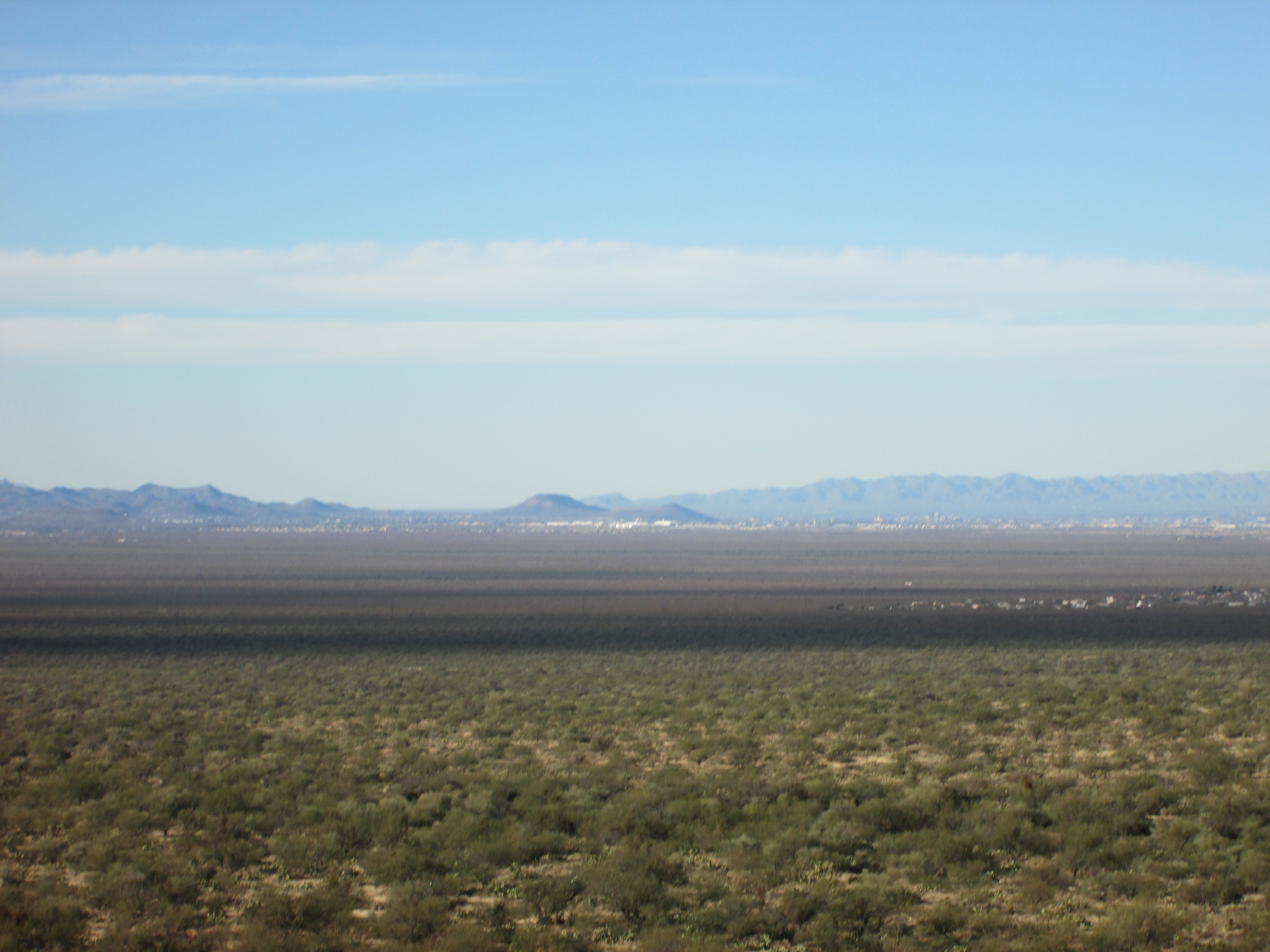
- View across the Tucson Basin towards Tumamoc Hill (left) and "A" Mountain (center)

Highest point
- Prominence: 3,108 ft (947 m)
- Coordinates: 32°12′46″N 111°00′22″W

Naming
- Etymology: from Tohono O'odham Cemamagĭ Doʼag 'Horned lizard mountain'

Geography
- Location within Arizona
- Location: Tucson, Arizona, Sonoran Desert
- Parent range: Tucson Mountains

Tumamoc Hill (O'odham: Cemamagĭ Doʼag Horned lizard mountain) is a butte located immediately west of "A" Mountain and downtown Tucson, Arizona. It is home to many radio, television, and public safety transmitters. The 860-acre ecological reserve and U.S. National Historic Landmark was established by the Carnegie Institution in 1903. The University of Arizona (UA) owns a 340-acre (1.4 km^{2}) preserve and leases another 509 acres (2.06 km^{2}) as a research and education facility. The Steward Observatory maintains a small astronomical observatory with a 20-inch (510 mm) telescope on the hill. Besides being a prominent landmark, Tumamoc Hill has a long and varied history, and is currently an important site for ecological and anthropological research as well as a refuge and a recreational option for the people of Tucson. Part of the University of Arizona, the Desert Laboratory is located on Tumamoc.

== Official Designations and Management ==
- National Environmental Study Site
- Arizona State Scientific and Natural Educational Area
- National Historic Landmark
- National Register of Historic Places

== Human history ==
Tumamoc was a home to the ancient Hohokam people. It is the site of the earliest known trincheras village, consisting of 160 foundations of round stone structures, as well as large stone perimeter walls. Over 460 petroglyphs and a prehistoric garden beside the hill provide further evidence of Tumamoc’s importance to these people. For long after that time, 1,300 years ago, the site continued to provide resources to the Tohono O'odham, Akimel O'odham, and the Hopi. It has also been reported to be a burial site for the Apache and the O'odham.

Captain Juan Mateo Manje, a Spanish military commander, wrote the following about Tumamoc Hill after seeing it on one of his expeditions with Father Kino between 1693 and 1701:

We passed in sight of, and around, a mountain where there are 100 terraces of stone wall in the form of a snail, spiraling to the top. They say it forms an armory, where in former wars those who gained the heights first were usually victors. Those who reached the first ring went around to the second, and as far as was necessary to exhaust the supply of arrows of those below. Then they came down from the mountain and fell upon their enemies and killed them.

Note that Manje refers to "former" wars, indicating that the fighting took place in prehistoric times (before the arrival of Europeans). Being that the O'odham are probably descendants of the Hohokam, it does not seem unreasonable to conclude that the Hohokam, who lived only a few centuries before Manje's expedition, did as their later relatives apparently did and used their trincheras to fall upon their enemies and kill them.

European settlers prized the rock and clay found on the hill for building in the late 19th century, and early ecologists just after the turn of the 20th century selected it for the site of the Carnegie Institute's Desert Laboratory. The hill continues to be a landmark and a sanctuary for the people of Tucson today. The road up Tumamoc Hill is a popular destination for walking and running. The entrance to the road up the hill is located across from St. Mary's Hospital on the south side of Anklam Road. It is open to pedestrians in the early mornings and evenings. The steep hill provides a strenuous workout, as well as citywide vistas. Lectures on the unique history and ecology are presented for the public at the site.

== History of ecological research ==
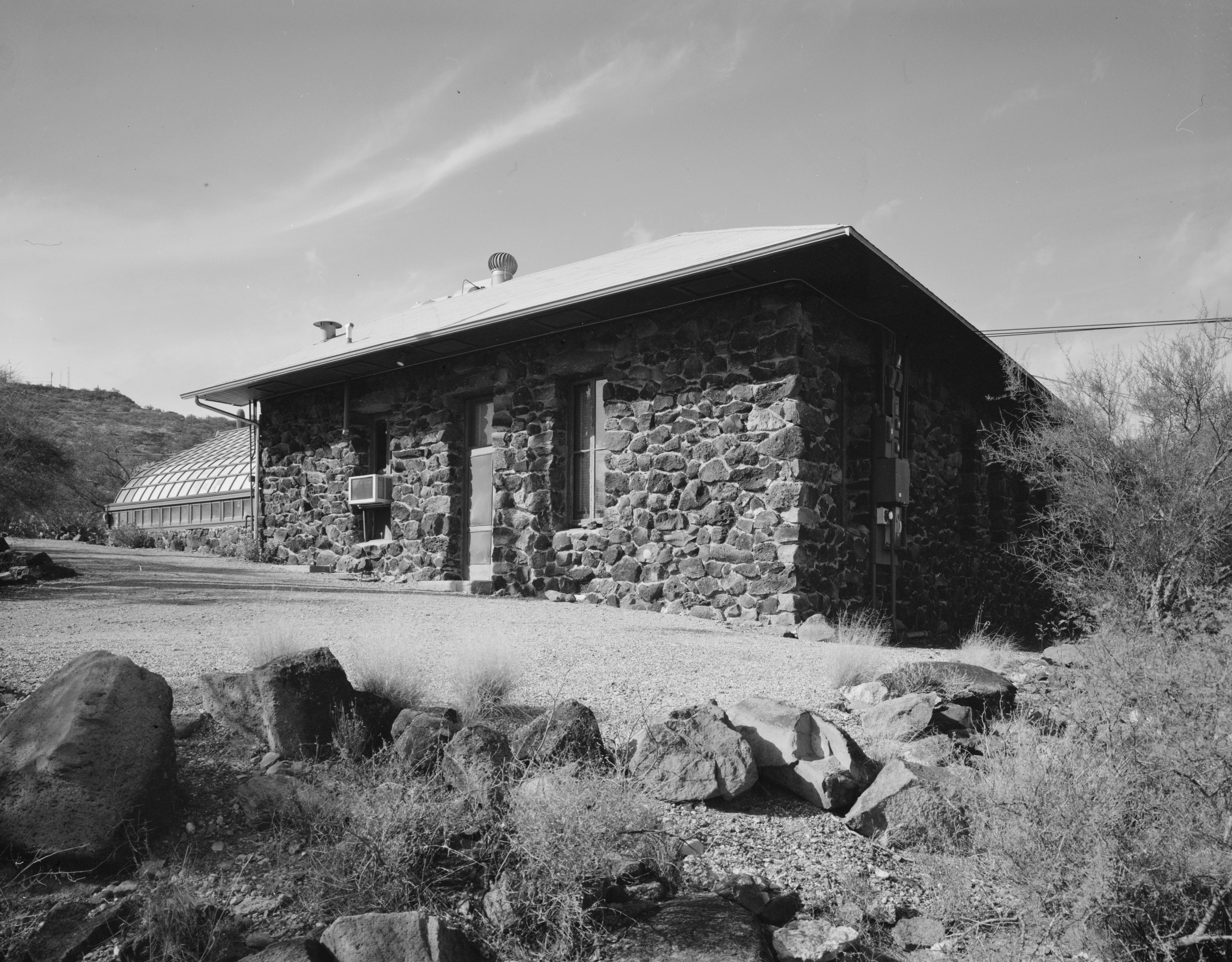
The Desert Laboratory in 1981. Built in 1903, today the lab is a National Historic Landmark.

Frederick V. Colville, chief botanist of the Department of Agriculture, in 1903 convinced the Carnegie Institute of Washington to fund the creation of a Desert Laboratory near the small mining and ranching town of Tucson. The goal was to study desert adaptations of plants in hopes of increasing agricultural output of the desert. Among the pioneering researchers, who helped to shape the then-developing field of ecology in the United States, were William Cannon, Volney M. Spalding, Daniel T. MacDougal, Burton Livingston, Godfrey Sykes, and Forrest Shreve. This research continued until the 1940s, during which time the scientists there were instrumental in the development of the field of ecology in the United States. They began publishing a journal, Plant World, which later became the major journal Ecology.

Due to financial difficulties from the Great Depression, as well as a disconnect between the Carnegie Institute’s mission of making use of the desert and the researchers’ admiration of it, the Carnegie Institute turned the Desert Laboratory over to the Forest Service in 1940. They initially offered it to the University of Arizona for $1, but were turned down. Twenty years later, on July 20, 1960, after several easements and loss of research and records, the University purchased the reserve for considerably more.

The long term observations and experiments on Tumamoc Hill’s vegetation have provided insights on saguaro boom and bust population dynamics, blue palo verde’s dependence on riparian areas, disease and other threats to desert tortoises, and the interactions of a community of small winter annuals and the insects and rodents that prey on their seeds.

== See also ==
- "A" Mountain
- Black Mountain (Pima County, Arizona)
- National Register of Historic Places listings in Pima County, Arizona
