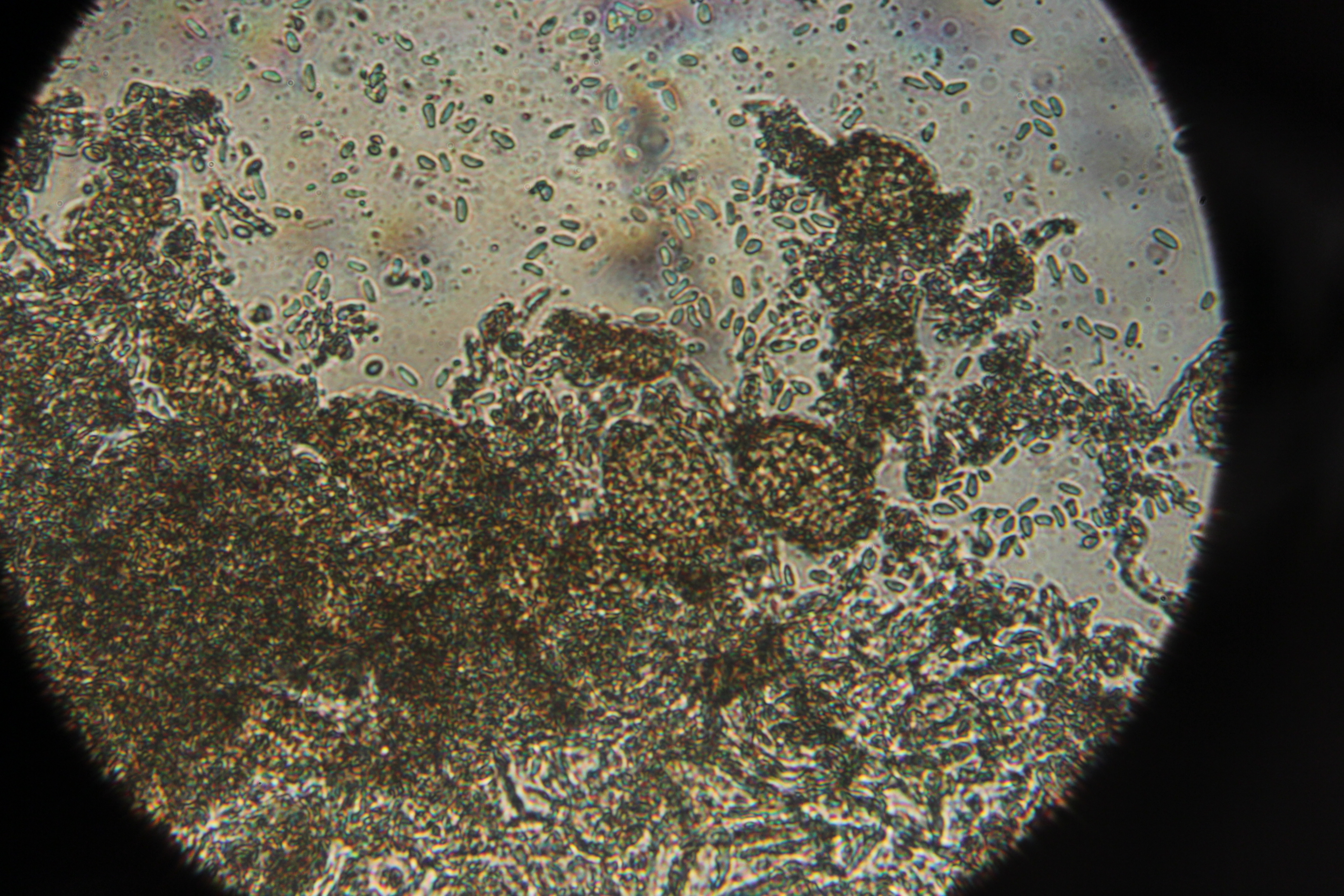

Scientific classification
- Kingdom: Fungi
- Division: Ascomycota
- Class: Dothideomycetes
- Order: Pleosporales
- Family: Phaeosphaeriaceae
- Genus: Ampelomyces
- Species: A. quisqualis

Binomial name
- Ampelomyces quisqualis Ces., 1852

Synonyms
- Cicinnobolus cesatii de Bary, 1870

= Ampelomyces quisqualis =

Species of fungus

Ampelomyces quisqualis is an anamorphic fungus that is a hyperparasite of powdery mildews. This parasitism reduces growth and may eventually kill the mildew. These mycoparasites can live up to 21 days on mildew-free host plant surfaces, attacking powdery mildew structures as soon as they appear. A. quisqualis is used as the active ingredient in a commercial fungicide.

== Distribution and habitat ==
Ampelomyces quisqualis has been shown to attack more than 64 species of powdery mildew in the genera Brasiliomyces, Erysiphe, Phyllactinia, and Podosphaera. Powdery mildews in the family Erysiphaceae are widespread and varied. These powdery mildews occur on every continent bar Antarctica and have been recorded on over 1000 species of plant.

== Life cycle ==
Ampelomyces quisqualis is a mycoparasite of powdery mildews. It overwinters or survives in the absence of a suitable host as pycnidia. Raindrops cause conidia to be expelled from ripe pycnidia and these may splash onto nearby powdery mildew. Infection is favoured by humid conditions and temperatures in the range 20 to 30 °C (68 to 86 °F) and may occur within 24 hours. Hyphae, conidiophores and immature cleistothecia can all be infected, the mycoparasite entering through the cell walls, and the previously transparent tissues turning milky-white. The infection spreads through the mildew colony for seven to ten days, after which time pycnidia begin to form. Their formation is complete in two to four days, when infected cells die, swelling considerably and turning brownish. Raindrops cause the release of conidia from the mature pycnidia which can cause secondary infections. There may be several generations of the mycoparasite during the growing season.

== Uses ==
Ampelomyces quisqualis is up to 98% effective in controlling the powdery mildew Golovinomyces tabaci on both young and old leaves of cucumber. It is used to control Podosphaera xanthii complex on cucumber, another common cause of powdery mildew, but at the same time causes beige angular lesions on leaves and sunken greenish or tan lesions on fruit which reduces the value of the crop.

The conidia of Ampelomyces quisqualis have been formulated and marketed in pellet and powder form as "AQ10". In the laboratory these were only partially efficient; they did not reduce the size of colonies of the powdery mildew Podosphaera xanthii s.l. (formerly Podosphaera fuliginea) to any significant extent, but reduced the number of new infections initiated. However, acceptable disease control has been achieved in various greenhouse and field-grown crops. It is usually necessary to repeat the applications, and high humidity and raindrops assist in spreading the mycoparasite to new mildew colonies.
