= Rotylenchus robustus =

Scientific classification
- Domain: Eukaryota
- Kingdom: Animalia
- Phylum: Nematoda
- Class: Secernentea
- Order: Tylenchida
- Family: Hoplolaimidae
- Genus: Rotylenchus
- Species: R. robustus

Binomial name
- Rotylenchus robustus (de Man, 1876)

Synonyms
- Tylenchus robustus Hoplolaimus uniformis Rotylenchus uniformis Anguillulina robusta Rotylenchus goodeyi Rotylenchus fallorobustus

Species of roundworm

Rotylenchus robustus (Thorne's lance nematode) is a plant pathogenic nematode infecting lettuce.
