= Hoplolaimus pararobustus =

Scientific classification
- Domain: Eukaryota
- Kingdom: Animalia
- Phylum: Nematoda
- Class: Secernentea
- Order: Tylenchida
- Family: Hoplolaimidae
- Genus: Hoplolaimus
- Species: H. pararobustus

Binomial name
- Hoplolaimus pararobustus (Schuurmans Stekhoven & Teunissen, 1938)

Synonyms
- Tylenchorhynchus pararobustus Rotylenchus pararobustus Gottholdsteineria pararobustus Hoplolaimus angustalatus Hoplolaimus kittenbergeri Hoplolaimus proporicus

Species of roundworm

Hoplolaimus pararobustus is a plant pathogenic nematode.
