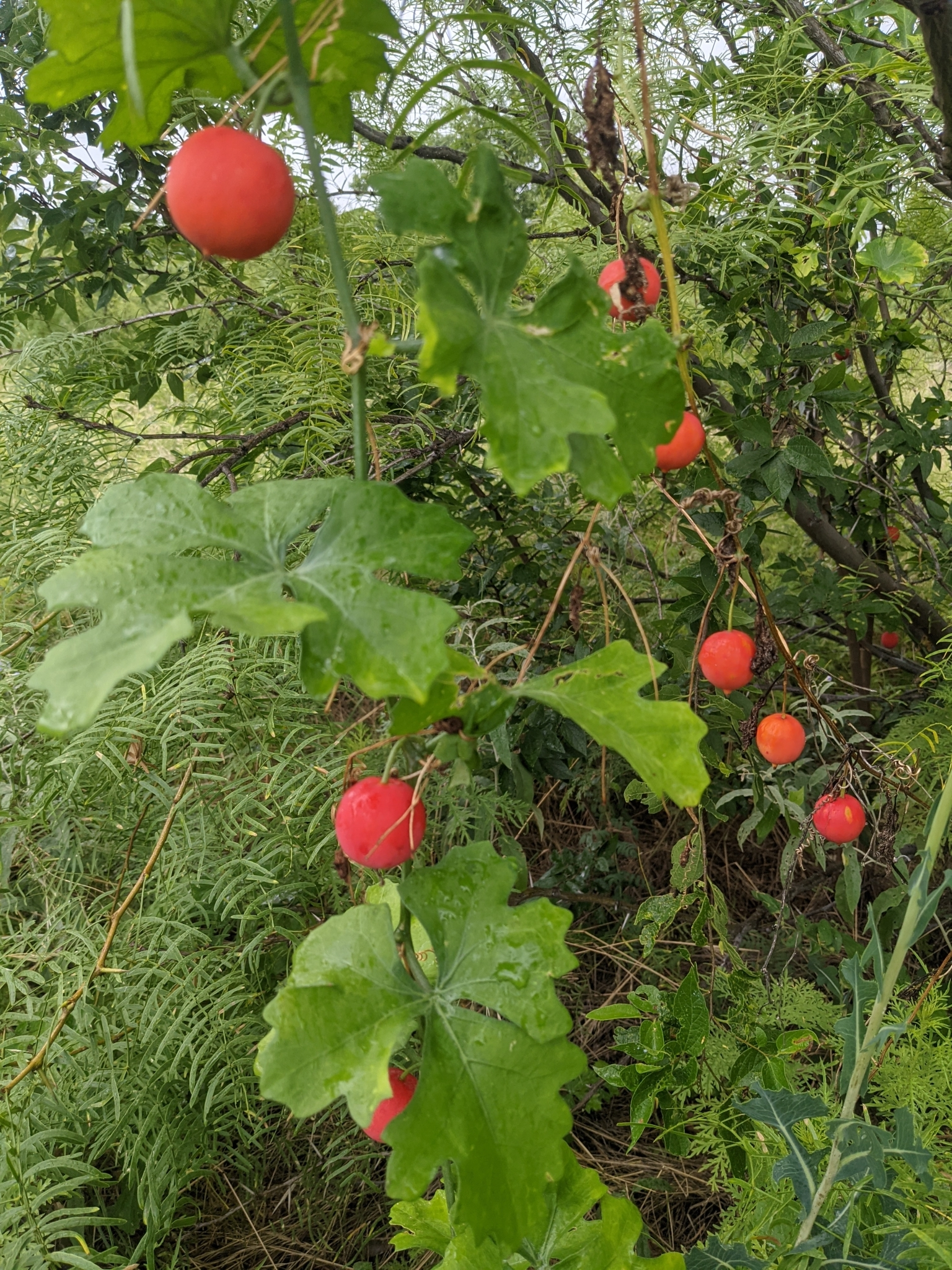
- Ibervillea lindheimeri

Scientific classification
- Kingdom: Plantae
- Clade: Embryophytes
- Clade: Tracheophytes
- Clade: Angiosperms
- Clade: Eudicots
- Clade: Rosids
- Order: Cucurbitales
- Family: Cucurbitaceae
- Genus: Ibervillea; Greene (1895)

Synonyms
- Dieterlea E.J.Lott (1986); Maximowiczia Cogn. (1881), nom. illeg.; Tumamoca Rose (1912)

= Ibervillea =

Genus of plants

Ibervillea is a genus of flowering plants belonging to the family Cucurbitaceae.

Its native range is Arizona, Oklahoma New Mexico, Texas and south to Mexico, Belize and Guatemala.

The genus name of Ibervillea is in honour of Pierre Le Moyne d'Iberville (1661–1706), a soldier, ship captain, explorer, colonial administrator, knight of the Order of Saint-Louis, adventurer, privateer, trader, member of Compagnies Franches de la Marine and founder of the French colony of Louisiana in New France. It was first described and published in Erythea Vol.3 on page 75 in 1895.

== Known species ==
According to Kew:

- Ibervillea fusiformis (E.J.Lott) Kearns
- Ibervillea hypoleuca (Standl.) C.Jeffrey
- Ibervillea lindheimeri (A.Gray) Greene
- Ibervillea macdougalii (Rose) Lira, Dávila & Legaspi
- Ibervillea maxima Lira & Kearns
- Ibervillea millspaughii (Cogn.) C.Jeffrey
- Ibervillea sonorae (S.Watson) Greene
- Ibervillea tenuisecta (A.Gray) Small
