= Hoplolaimus magnistylus =

Scientific classification
- Kingdom: Animalia
- Phylum: Nematoda
- Class: Secernentea
- Order: Tylenchida
- Family: Hoplolaimidae
- Genus: Hoplolaimus
- Species: H. magnistylus

Binomial name
- Hoplolaimus magnistylus Robbins, 1982

Species of roundworm

Hoplolaimus magnistylus is a plant pathogenic nematode affecting soybeans, corn, cotton, sassafras, and wild plum. It is found in the United States. H. magnistylus was first described in 1982. The species was found in the soil of experimental fields in Arkansas.

== See also ==
- List of soybean diseases
