= Helicotylenchus multicinctus =

Scientific classification
- Domain: Eukaryota
- Kingdom: Animalia
- Phylum: Nematoda
- Class: Secernentea
- Order: Tylenchida
- Family: Hoplolaimidae
- Genus: Helicotylenchus
- Species: H. multicinctus

Binomial name
- Helicotylenchus multicinctus (Cobb, 1893) Golden, 1956

Synonyms
- Tylenchus multicinctus Tylenchorhynchus multicinctus Anguillulina multicincta Rotylenchus multicinctus Rotylenchus iperoiguensis Helicotylenchus iperoiguensis

Species of roundworm

Helicotylenchus multicinctus is a plant pathogenic nematode that affects primarily bananas and plantains. Nematodes of the genus Helicotylenchus are spiral nematodes and feed on a large variety of plant species.

== History and significance ==
Helicotylenchus multicinctus was first described by Nathan A. Cobb in 1893 as Tylenchus multicinctus. After further study by A.M. Golden in 1956 it was transferred to the genus Helicotylenchus. As a plant parasitic nematode of bananas it is often considered second in importance to Radopholus similis.

== Distribution ==
Found in most banana and plantain growing regions of the world including tropical and temperate regions of Asia, Africa, North America, Central America, South America and the Pacific Islands.

== Morphology ==
Refer to Helicotylenchus for morphological description

== Life cycle ==
The average life cycle is 30–45 days. The first stage juvenile and first molt are completed within the egg. Second stage juveniles possess a digitate tail. The esophagus measures 41% of the body length with a 14 μm stylet. After the second molt the tail disappears and there is rapid growth in the intestine region. Female gonad development begins in the third stage juvenile with the esophagus measuring 28% body length and the stylet measuring 18 μm. After the fourth molt female gonads are completely developed but the vulva and vagina are not visible until molting is complete. An adult female has an esophagus measuring 22% body length and a stylet of 22.5 μm. Males are shorter and thinner than females.

== Host parasite relationship ==
Helicotylenchus multicinctus feeds primarily on cortical root tissue 4–6 cells deep. The nematode produces small lesions that are mostly shallow and superficial. Heavy infestations may cause root necrosis. Ultimately feeding deprives the plant of water and nutrients and can lead to shorten plant stand.

== Management ==
Nematodes are spread through the soil and through infested banana plantlets. The best option is to ensure that banana corms are free of any nematodes prior to planting. Researchers in Hawaii found that a hot-water treatment at 50 °C for 10 minutes was enough to kill all nematodes in a corm 2–6 inches thick. Soil solarization, or heating and insulating of the soil, can cause nematode death although heat may not penetrate deep enough to kill all nematodes. Cover crops such as sunn hemp and some species of marigold may reduce the amount of spiral nematodes in the soil prior to banana establishment. Nematicides are also an option. In Africa, nematicides applied with drip irrigation have shown to decrease cost and increase effectiveness.
