= Scutellonema =

Scientific classification
- Domain: Eukaryota
- Kingdom: Animalia
- Phylum: Nematoda
- Class: Secernentea
- Order: Tylenchida
- Family: Hoplolaimidae
- Genus: Scutellonema; Andrássy, 1958

Genus of roundworms

Scutellonema is a genus of nematodes belonging to the family Hoplolaimidae.

The species of this genus are found in Southern Hemisphere.

Species:

- Scutellonema abberans
- Scutellonema blaberum
- Scutellonema brachyurum (Steiner, 1938)
- Scutellonema bradys (Steiner & LeHew, 1933)
- Scutellonema cavenessi Sher, 1963
- Scutellonema christiei
- Scutellonema clathricaudatum Whitehead, 1959
- Scutellonema clavicaudatum Berg, Tiedt, Stanley, Inserra & Subbotin, 2017
- Scutellonema siamense Timm, 1965
- Scutellonema unum Sher, 1964
