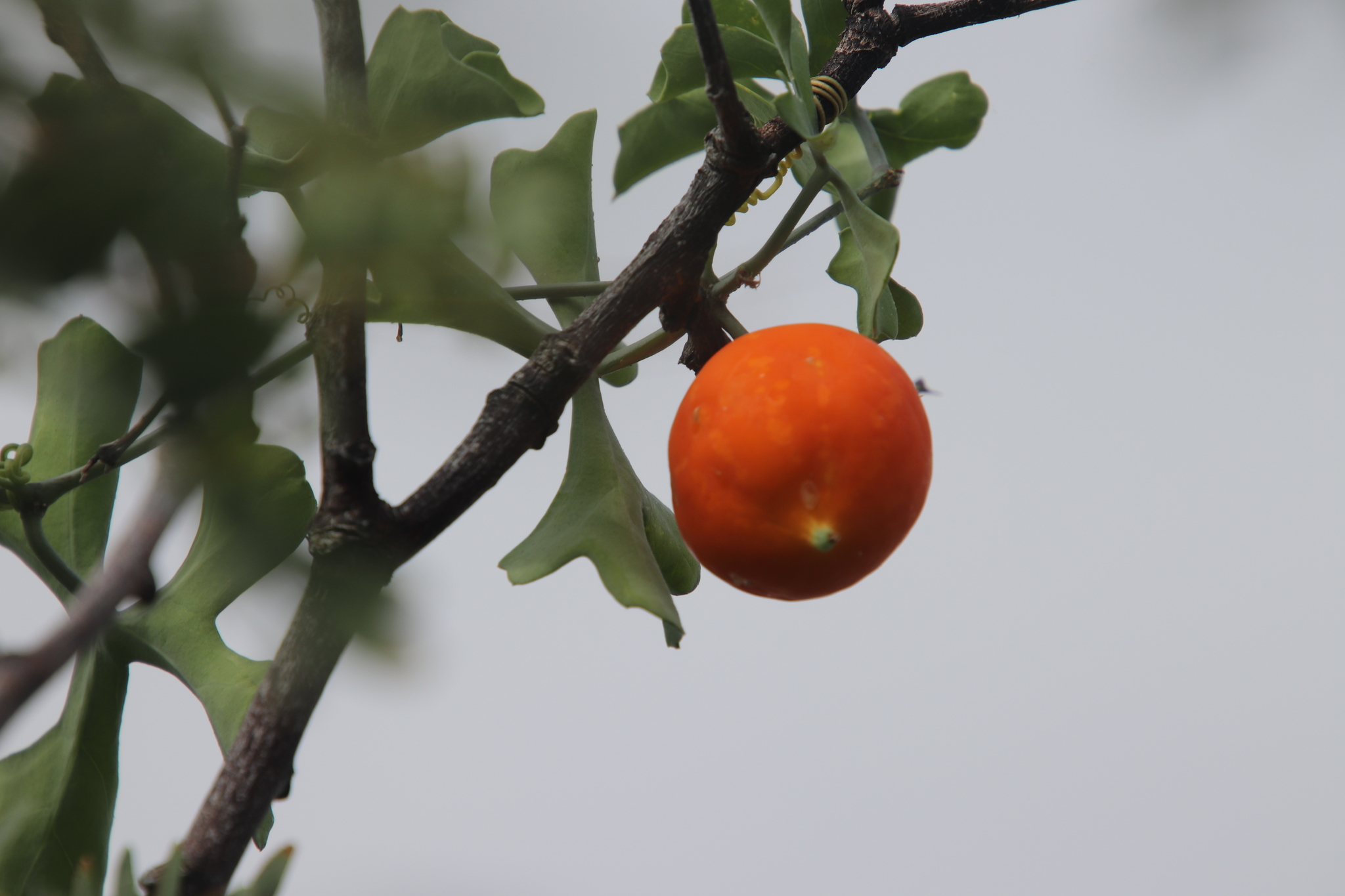
- The liana-like shoots wrapping around a branch with the orange fruit

Scientific classification
- Kingdom: Plantae
- Clade: Tracheophytes
- Clade: Angiosperms
- Clade: Eudicots
- Clade: Rosids
- Order: Cucurbitales
- Family: Cucurbitaceae
- Genus: Ibervillea
- Species: I. sonorae

Binomial name
- Ibervillea sonorae (S.Watson) Greene

= Ibervillea sonorae =

Wereke

Species of plant

Ibervillea sonorae is a tuberous perennial plant in the Cucurbitaceae family known by the common names wereke, wareque, guarequi, and coyote melon. It is a highly variable species characterized by a large, succulent tuberous root, which in the dry sand of its native habitat resembles a gray, dust-covered boulder. Emerging from the root yearly are long, flexible liana-like shoots, which reach a length of three or more meters. This species is native to northwestern Mexico, being found in the states of Baja California, Baja California Sur, Sonora and Sinaloa.

== Description ==
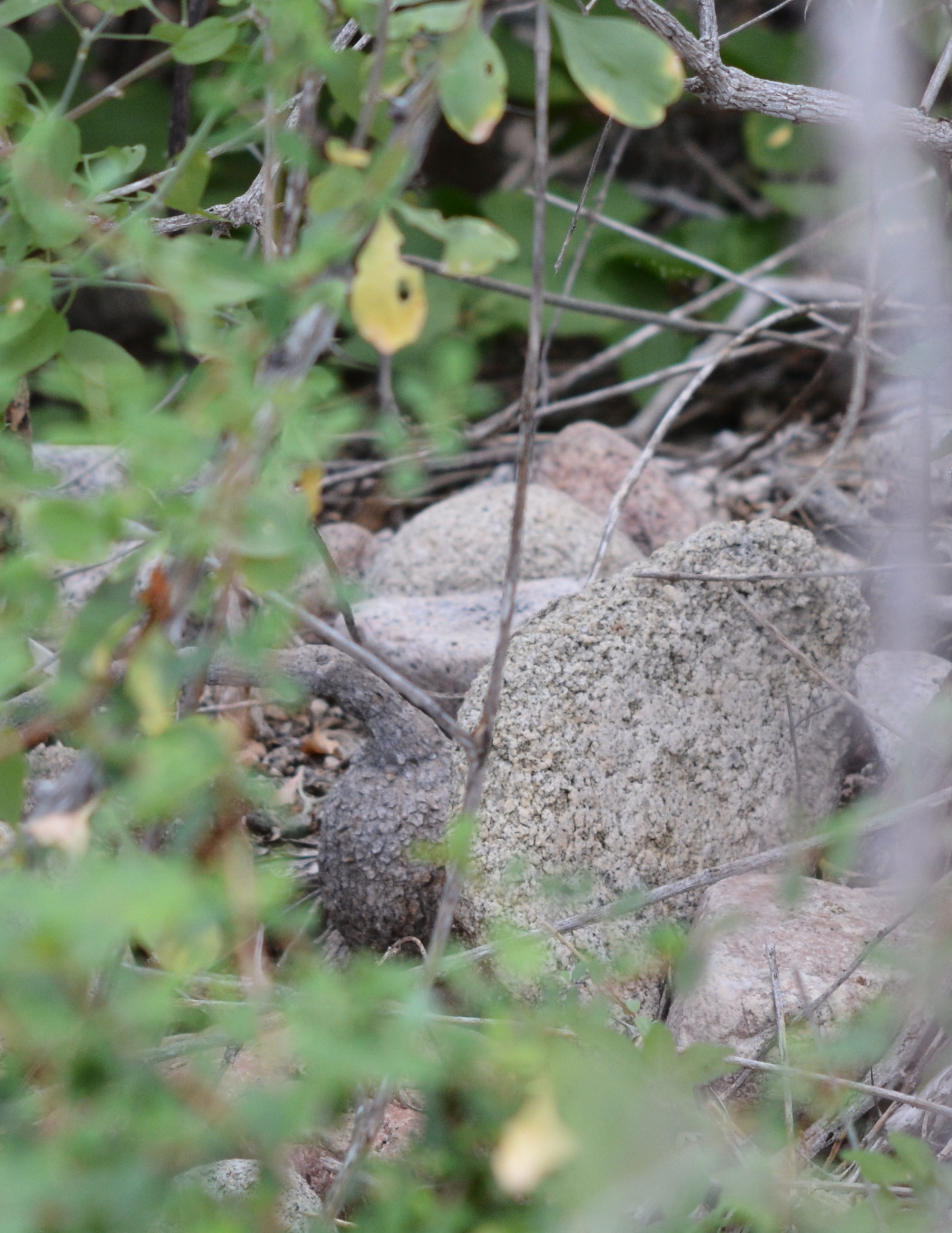
The tuberous root, concealed with its stone-like appearance

A perennial plant with a large tuberous rootstock that resembles a boulder, shoots emerge annually with bright green leaves and have dioecious flowers and reddish or orangish fruits. The fruits are not bad smelling, but are unpalatable as they are very bitter.

=== Morphology ===
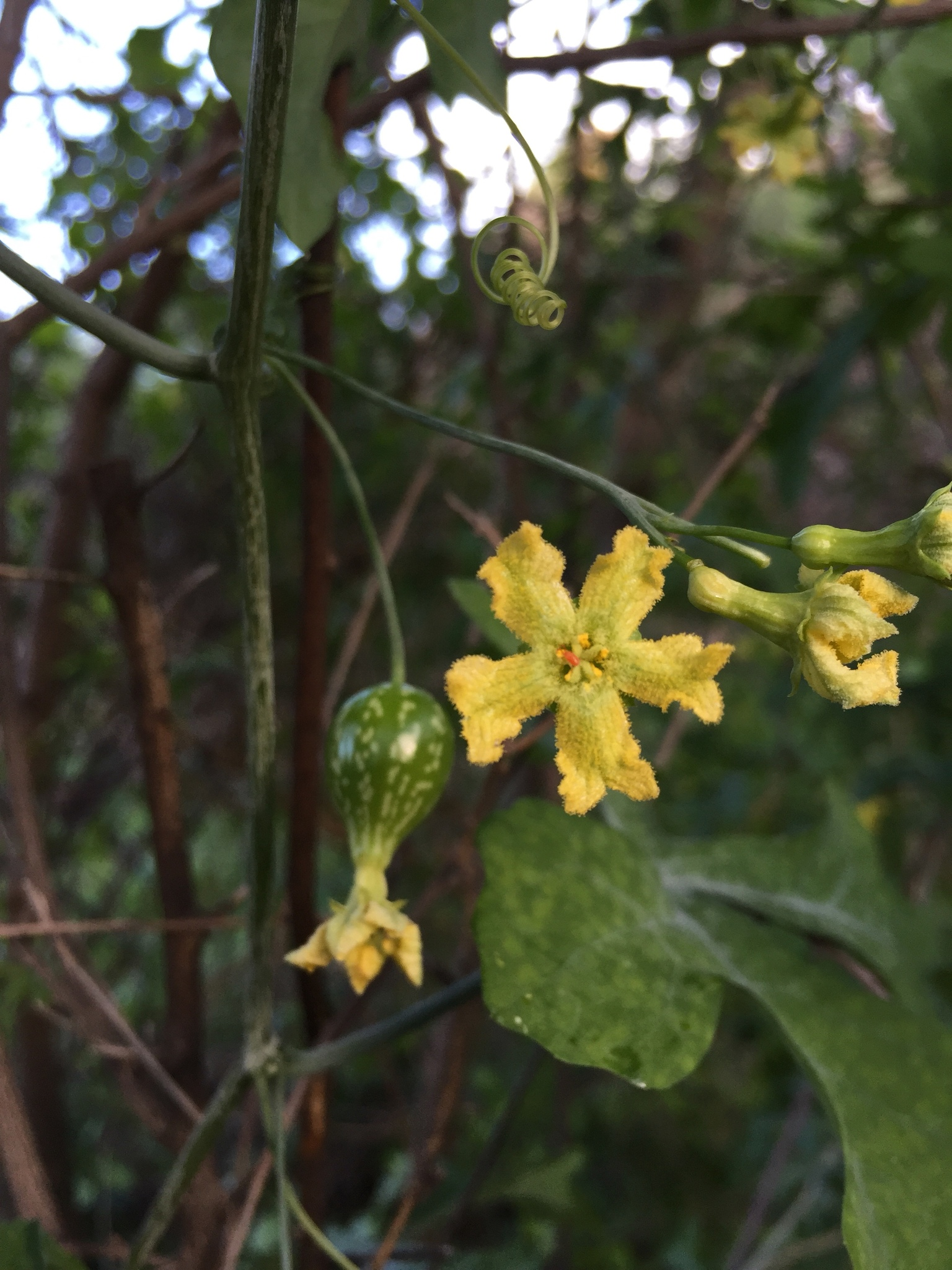
The flowers

This plant has an enormous tuberous rootstock, filled with water and nutrients, which gives it marked vitality in the xeric environment. The large, succulent tuber blends in well with its arid habitat, with the irregularly shaped gray tuber giving the effect of stone. In spring, shoots may emerge, dying back in fall and emerging again the next year. The long, flexible liana-like shoots bear leaves and tendrils, and may reach a length of 3 m or more. The shoots are round, smooth, and green above, while gradually blending back into the tuber below. The tendrils are branched.

On the shoots are the leaves, which are twice 3-cleft, colored bright green and lacking leaf glands. The dioecious flowers always appear with leaves, the male flowers in racemes and the female flowers solitary. The flowers open early in the morning, after dawn, and close in the afternoon. The petals are yellow. The fruits of the plant are about 1.25 inches (3.2 cm) to 1.5 inches (3.8 cm) long, and colored reddish to orange, "amber colored."

== Taxonomy ==
The first description of this species was by Sereno Watson, as Maximowcizia sonorae in 1889. Edward Palmer had previously found this plant in Guaymas in 1887. Edward Lee Greene created the genus Ibervillea, as the name Maximowiczia had already been previously used to describe a taxon. Greene then named this species Ibervillea sonorae.

== Distribution and habitat ==
This species is distributed throughout portions of northwestern Mexico. On the Baja California peninsula, it is found in extreme southeast Baja California state from the vicinity of the Sierra de La Libertad south to the Cape region of Baja California Sur and on various islands adjacent to the peninsula. It is also found throughout Sonora, and in Sinaloa.
