= Hoplolaimus =

Scientific classification
- Kingdom: Animalia
- Phylum: Nematoda
- Class: Secernentea
- Order: Tylenchida
- Family: Hoplolaimidae
- Genus: Hoplolaimus von Daday, 1905

Species
- about 29

Synonyms
- Basirolaimus; Hoplolaimoides; Nemonchus

Genus of roundworms

Hoplolaimus is a genus of nematodes known commonly as lance nematodes. They are parasites of plants, and three species are pests of agricultural crops.

These nematodes are usually about 1 to 1.5 millimeters long; some reach 2 millimeters. They have large stylets with knobs shaped like anchors or tulips. The male has winglike folds around its tail, and the female has a short, rounded tail. Some species are amphimictic, with male and female individuals that reproduce sexually, while others are parthenogenetic, with females producing offspring without fertilization.

The genus includes ectoparasites, endoparasites, and semi-endoparasites. They feed on plant roots, some feeding externally, some burying only their heads in the roots, and some entering the roots to feed.

Damage can be manifested in the sloughing of the root cortices. The main agricultural pest species are H. columbus, H. galeatus, and H. magnistylus. H. columbus infects such crops as cotton, soybean, and corn. H. galeatus can be found in many crops, as well as many species of pine trees and grasses.

There are 29 described species in genus Hoplolaimus.

Species include:

- Hoplolaimus abelmoschi
- Hoplolaimus aegypti
- Hoplolaimus aorolaimoides
- Hoplolaimus bachlongviensis
- Hoplolaimus californicus
- Hoplolaimus capensis
- Hoplolaimus casparus
- Hoplolaimus cephalus
- Hoplolaimus chambus
- Hoplolaimus citri
- Hoplolaimus clarissimus
- Hoplolaimus columbus
- Hoplolaimus concaudajuvencus
- Hoplolaimus dimorphicus
- Hoplolaimus dubius
- Hoplolaimus galeatus
- Hoplolaimus imphalensis
- Hoplolaimus indicus
- Hoplolaimus jalalabadiensis
- Hoplolaimus magnistylus
- Hoplolaimus pararobustus
- Hoplolaimus puertoricensis
- Hoplolaimus sacchari
- Hoplolaimus seinhorsti
- Hoplolaimus seshadrii
- Hoplolaimus sheri
- Hoplolaimus singhi
- Hoplolaimus smokyensis
- Hoplolaimus stephanus
- Hoplolaimus tabacum
- Hoplolaimus tuberosus
- Hoplolaimus tylenchiformis
- Hoplolaimus uniformis
