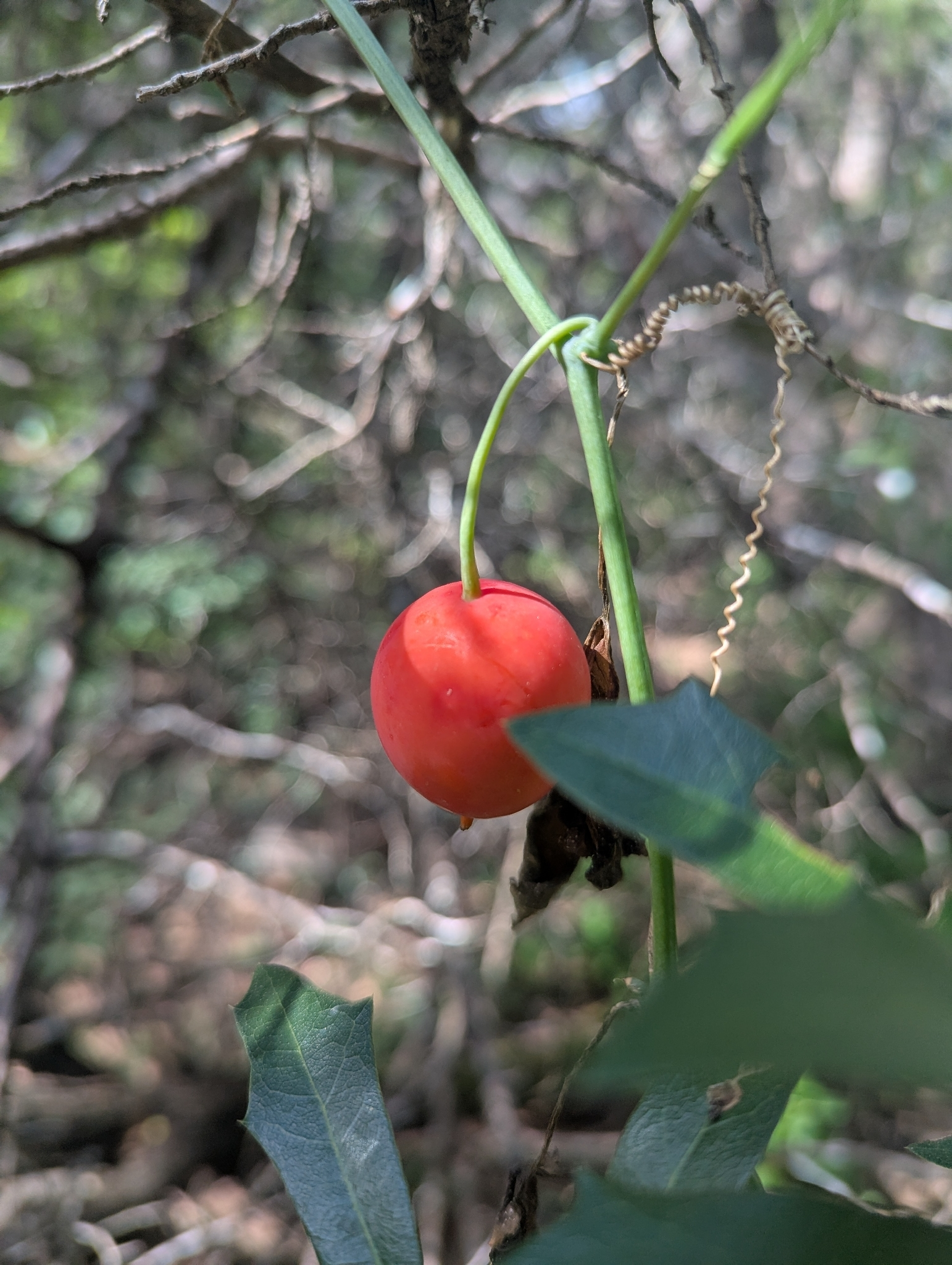

Conservation status
- Apparently Secure (NatureServe)

Scientific classification
- Kingdom: Plantae
- Clade: Embryophytes
- Clade: Tracheophytes
- Clade: Spermatophytes
- Clade: Angiosperms
- Clade: Eudicots
- Clade: Rosids
- Order: Cucurbitales
- Family: Cucurbitaceae
- Genus: Ibervillea
- Species: I. lindheimeri

Binomial name
- Ibervillea lindheimeri (A.Gray) Greene

Synonyms
- Sicydium lindheimeri A.Gray; Sicydium tenellum Naudin; Sicydium tripartitum Naudin; Maximowiczia lindheimeri (A.Gray) Cogn.; Maximowiczia tripartita (Naudin) Cogn.; Maximowiczia tripartita var. tenella (Naudin) Cogn.; Ibervillea tripartita (Naudin) Greene; Ibervillea tenella (Naudin) Small

= Ibervillea lindheimeri =

Species of flowering plant

Ibervillea lindheimeri, commonly called snake apple, balsam gourd, Rio Grande globeberry, or Lindheimer's globeberry is a species of flowering plant in the gourd family Cucurbitaceae.

== Description ==
Ibervillea lindheimeri is a perennial, deciduous vining plant with alternate leaves that grows up to 10 feet. The leaves have 3 to 5 lobes which are deeply cut and finely toothed and are 1.5 to 3.5 inches in diameter.

The yellow flowers typically bloom between April-September and have 5 deeply-cut and fine-toothed lobes. Flowers are about 0.5in across.

It produces 20-30mm berry-like, orange-red fruits which contain densely hairy seeds

== Distribution and habitat ==
Ibervillea lindheimeri is native to Texas, Oklahoma and New Mexico in the United States as well as Northern Mexico. It grows best in sunnier environments and will produce greater quantity of fruits, but is able to grow well in partial shade. It is a climbing plant typically requiring something to climb with tendrils.

== Uses ==
Ibervillea lindheimeri has been cultivated for its attractive leaves and red fruits as both an indoor plant and for gardens. The flowers attract a variety of pollinating insects and birds feed on the fruits.

The fruits are not known to be poisonous, and as such are not referenced in any toxic plant databases however, they are also not edible by humans and likewise not listed in any edible plant databases.
