= Desert Laboratory =

- Desert Laboratory — aka: Desert Botanical Laboratory; Tumamoc Hill; Tumamoc: People & Habitats
- U.S. National Register of Historic Places
- U.S. National Historic Landmark
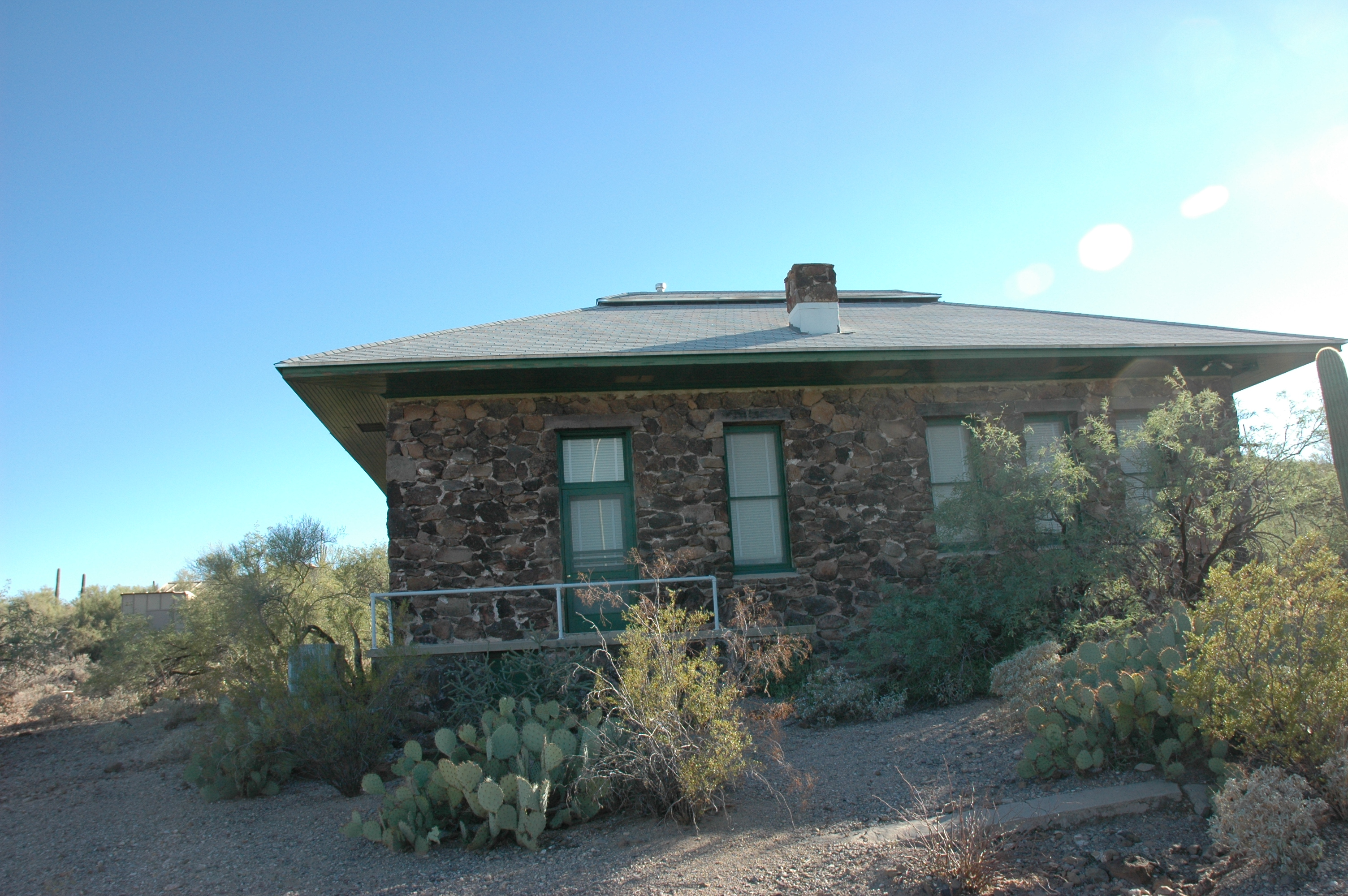

- Location within Arizona Location within the United States
- Location: 1675 West Anklam Road, Tucson, Arizona
- Coordinates: 32°13′31″N 111°0′9″W
- Area: 860 acres (3.5 km^{2})
- Built: 1903
- NRHP reference No.: 66000190

Significant dates
- Added to NRHP: October 15, 1966
- Designated NHL: December 21, 1965

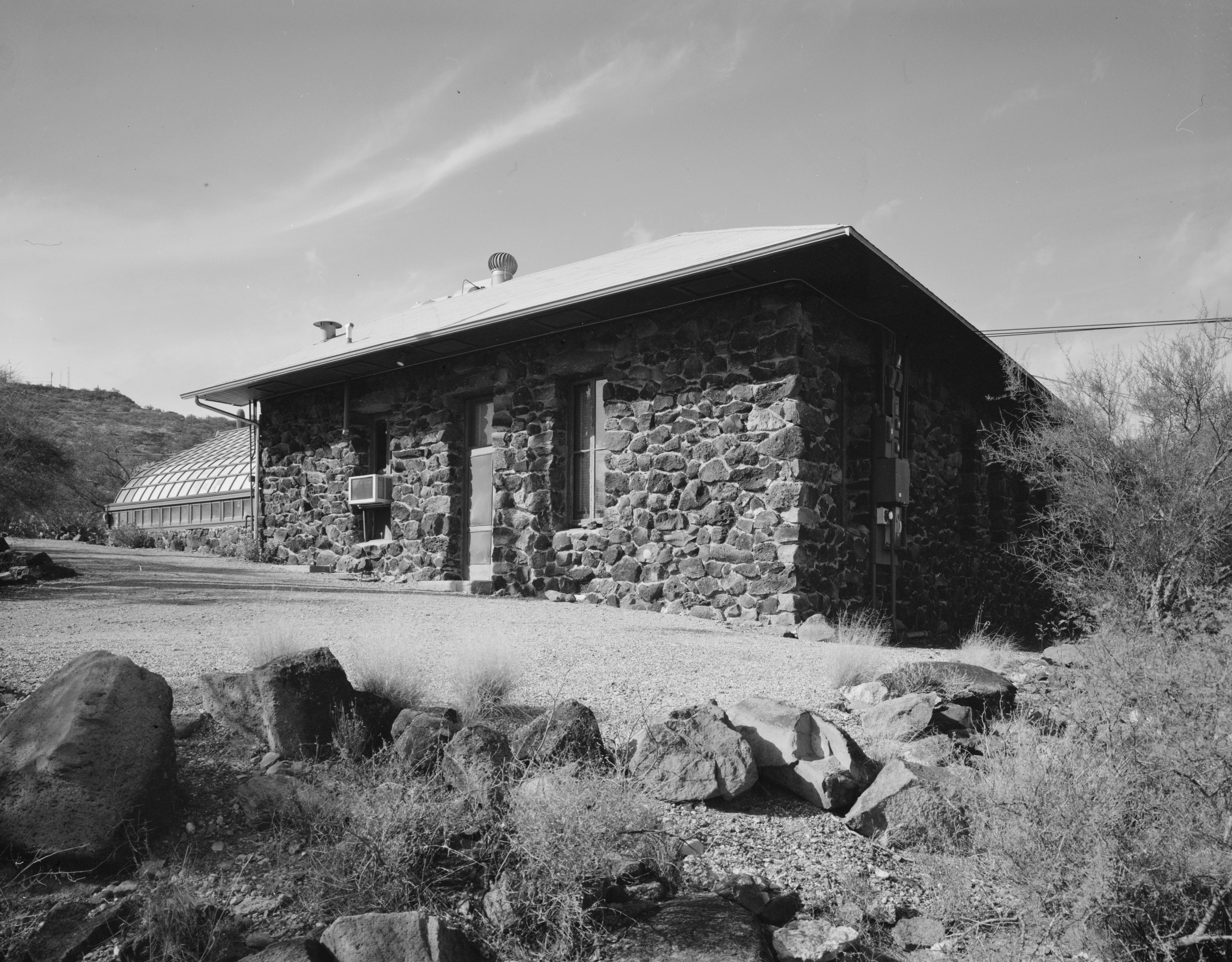
Northeastern wing of the main building, built in 1903, as it appeared in 1981.

The Desert Laboratory is a historic biological research facility atop Tumamoc Hill (O'odham: Cemamagĭ Doʼag) at 1675 West Anklam Road in Tucson, Arizona. It was founded by the Carnegie Institution in 1903 to study how plants survive and thrive in the heat and aridity of deserts, and was the first such privately funded effort in the nation. Beginning in 1906, numerous long term ecological observation areas were set up by Volney Spalding & Forrest Shreve on the 860 acres (3.5 km^{2}) scientific domain of Tumamoc Hill. Nine of these are the world's oldest permanent ecology study quadrats. The facility and staff were key contributors to what is now considered the science of ecology, including participating in the creation of the Ecological Society of America in 1915 and the Ecology journal. Led by Spalding & Shreve, they also contributed innovations in conservation.

Part of it was declared a National Historic Landmark in 1965. The rest was added in 1987.

== History ==
Acting on the authority of the Carnegie Institution of Washington, Frederick Vernon Coville Botanist of the USDA and Daniel T. McDougal of the New York Botanical Garden chose Tumamoc Hill as the location of the Desert Laboratory in February, 1903. It opened in October of that year.

It is operated by Tumamoc: People & Habitats, part of The University of Arizona's College of Science.
