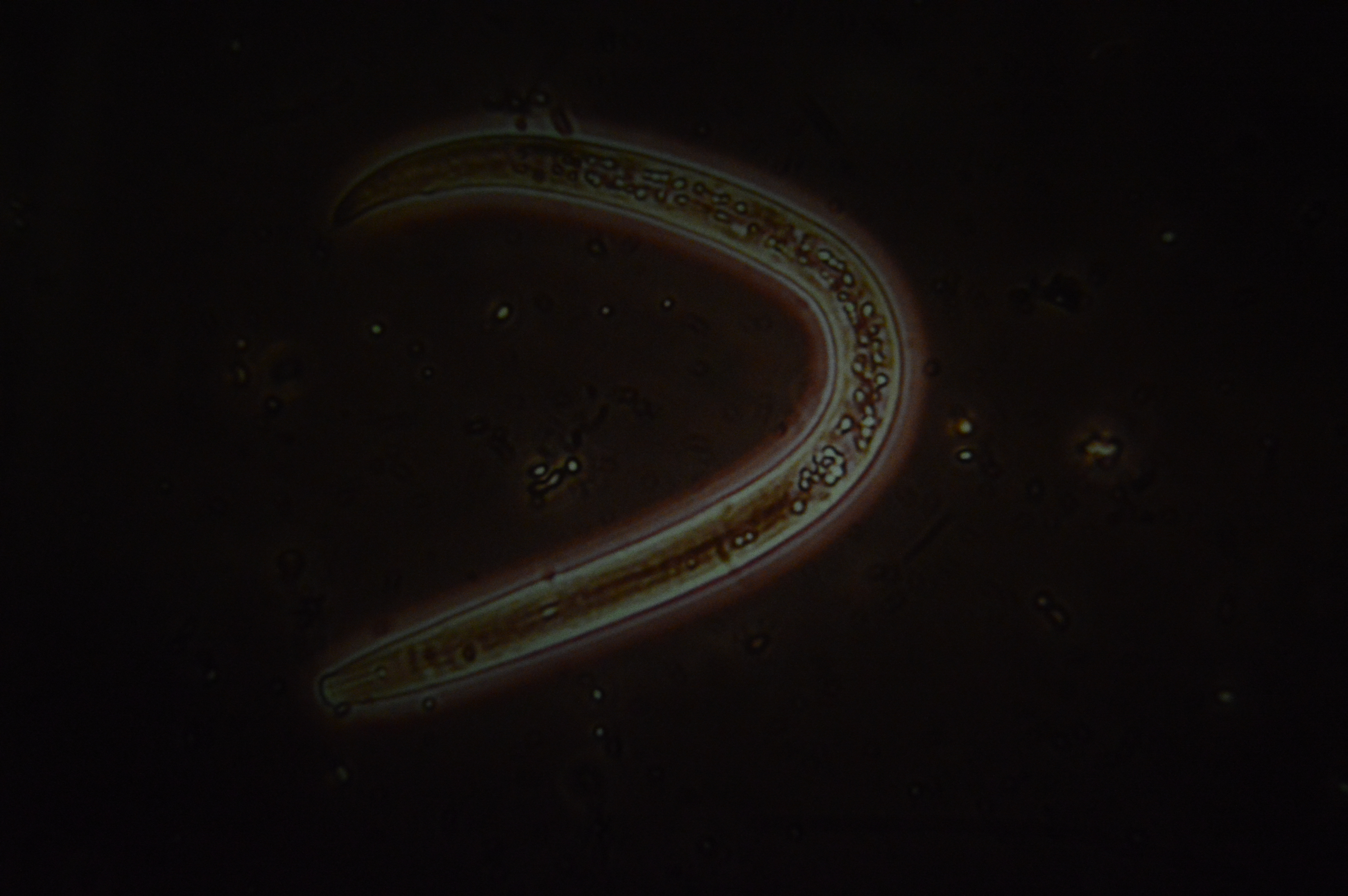

Scientific classification
- Kingdom: Animalia
- Phylum: Nematoda
- Class: Secernentea
- Order: Tylenchida
- Family: Hoplolaimidae
- Genus: Rotylenchulus
- Species: R. reniformis

Binomial name
- Rotylenchulus reniformis Linford and Oliveira, 1940

= Rotylenchulus reniformis =

Species of roundworm

Rotylenchulus reniformis, the reniform nematode, is a species of parasitic nematode of plants with a worldwide distribution in the tropical and subtropical regions.

== Taxonomy ==
This nematode has a wide host range, infecting many species of plants around the world. It was first observed on the roots of cowpea in Hawaii, and was described as new species and new genus in 1940. Its specific epithet, reniformis, was inspired by the kidney shape of the adult female. There are now ten species classified in the genus, but R. reniformis is the only species of major economic importance to agriculture. Recent studies have demonstrated R. macrosoma is the sister species to R. reniformis.

== Distribution and host range ==
R. reniformis has been reported from thousands of localities in the Americas, Africa, Europe, Asia, and Australia. It has a wide host range that includes fruit trees, lentil, cotton, pigeon pea, tea, tobacco, soybean, pineapple, banana, okra, coconut, cabbage, sweet potato, alfalfa, corn, asparagus, palm, cucumber, tomato, squash, cassava, radish, eggplant, guava, melon, chickpea, and ginger. Certain plants are considered to be non-hosts of the nematode, such as little barley, common barnyard grass, pangola grass, peppers, and some cultivars of black mustard, oat, spinach, and sugarcane.

== Morphology ==
The reniform nematode has esophageal glands overlapping the intestine and a short stylet. The dorsal esophageal gland orifice is located posterior to the stylet knobs. The immature female is slender and may be spiral- or C-shaped in death. It is about 0.3 to 0.5 millimeters long. The mature female has a swollen, kidney-shaped body with a short tail, a short, thin stylet with rounded stylet knobs, a three-part esophagus, a long and narrow isthmus, and a well-developed metacarpus. The vulva is just behind the middle of the body. The male is vermiform: with a wormlike appearance. It has a weak stylet, curved spicules, and a pointed tail. The esophagus is reduced.

== Life cycle ==
R. reniformis is sedentary semi-endoparasite on the roots of plants. The female penetrates the root and remains in one position at a permanent feeding site with its posterior end projecting from the root. The immature female is the infective agent, attacking the root and growing to maturity at its feeding site. Males and juveniles live in the soil; males are not parasites and do not feed. Under drought conditions the nematode can persist up to two years outside a host by entering an anhydrobiotic state.

The life cycle is 17 to 29 days long. The juvenile molts once while still inside the egg. The eggs hatch in 8 to 10 days. The juvenile molts three times to reach the immature stage. The immature female parasitizes the root for one to two weeks. During this time the male deposits sperm, which the female stores until her gonads mature. The nematode can also reproduce via parthenogenesis, without fertilization. Upon maturity the female exits the root and lays up to 200 eggs in a gelatinous matrix.

== Host-parasite relationship ==
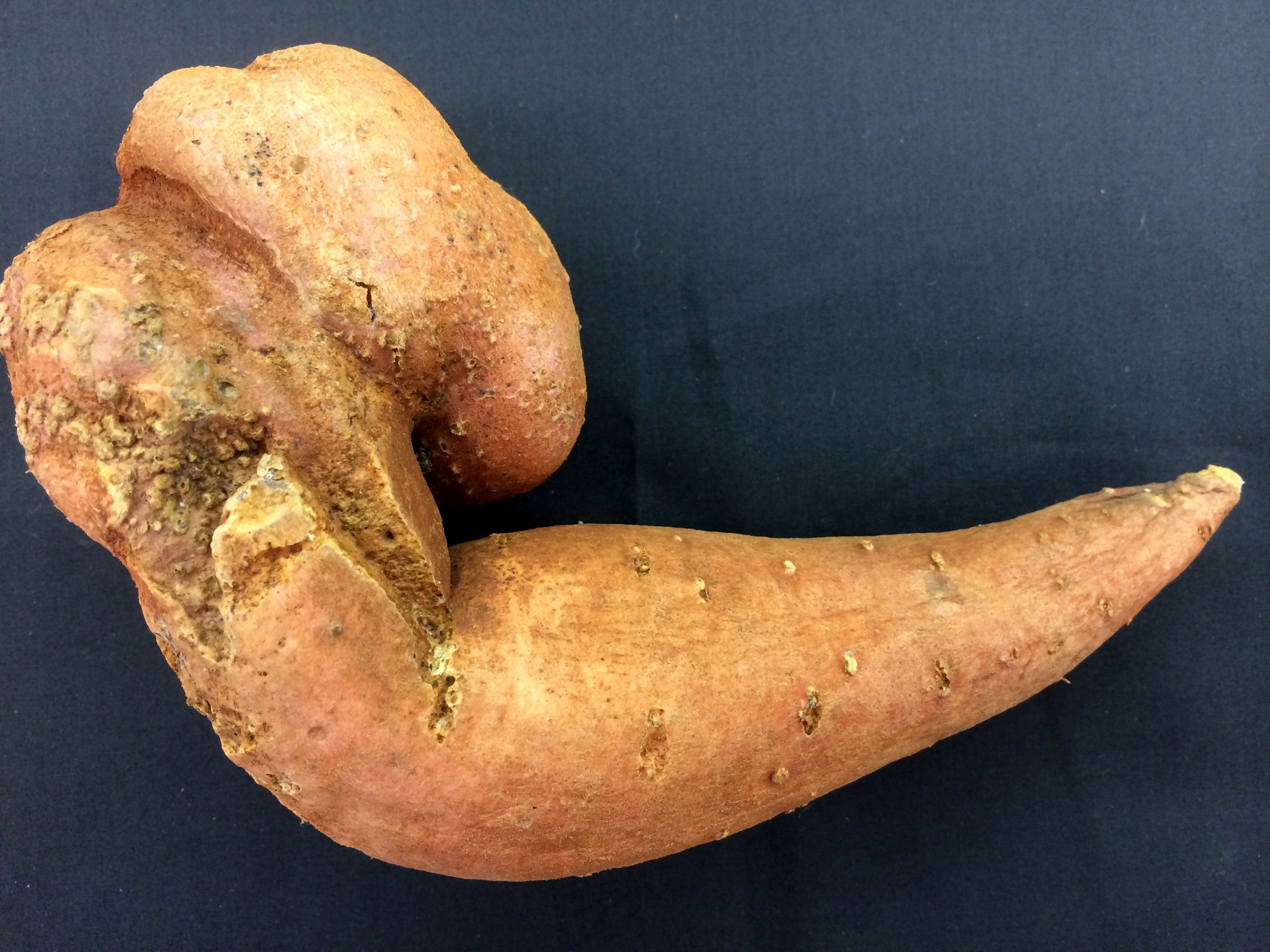
Sweetpotato infected by reniform nematodes

When the immature female penetrates the root, a feeding tube forms from stylet secretions. Reniform nematode infestations can be hard to detect, as they do not cause galls or other obvious symptoms. Instead, it causes symptoms in the host plant that resembles those of moisture and nutrient deficiencies. Reniform nematode cause hypertrophy in the pericycle cells of seedling roots and in the periderm cells of the roots of older plants. Root growth slows and secondary root development is limited. Root necrosis has been observed in pineapple and banana. Shoot growth suppression and reduction of fruit quality has been observed in crops such as pineapple. In sweet potato, early infection of reniform nematodes results in tuber cracking leading to poor storage quality. Infested plants can become stunted and chlorotic. Wilt disease can follow when opportunistic fungi such as Fusarium and Verticillium infect the plants, a process observed in cotton. Secondary fungal infection can also cause root decay. Damage from R. reniformis is directly related to the number of nematodes present when the crop is planted. Variation among nematode populations, hosts, environmental conditions, and soil types may alter the threshold or economic injury level across the geographic distribution of the nematode.

== Management ==
Management can be challenging, as reniform nematodes have been found in depths greater than 1m in soil and appear to become dominant over other nematodes such as southern root knot nematode (M. incognita). Some plants are resistant to this nematode. In susceptible taxa, chemical control is one of the most common management practices. Nematicides before and after planting can be effective. Intercropping and crop rotation, especially with resistant or non-host plants, is used as cultural control to improve soil, increase antagonistic microorganisms, and reduce nematode populations. French marigold (Tagetes patula) and sunn hemp (Crotalaria juncea) are recommended for these uses. Fallowing the land is another cultural practice that can be utilized, but it is much less effective than rotating resistant species, as nematodes can persist in the soil for a long time and feed off of weeds. The fungus Purpureocillium lilacinum and bacteria Bacillus firmus have shown potential to become commercial agents of biological pest control against the nematode in cotton.
