= Scutellonema brachyurum =

Scientific classification
- Kingdom: Animalia
- Phylum: Nematoda
- Class: Secernentea
- Order: Tylenchida
- Family: Hoplolaimidae
- Genus: Scutellonema
- Species: S. brachyurum

Binomial name
- Scutellonema brachyurum (Steiner, 1938)

Synonyms
- Rotylenchus brachyurus Rotylenchus coheni Scutellonema coheni Scutellonema boocki

Species of roundworm

Scutellonema brachyurum (British spiral nematode, Carolina spiral nematode) is a plant pathogenic nematode Infecting African violets.
