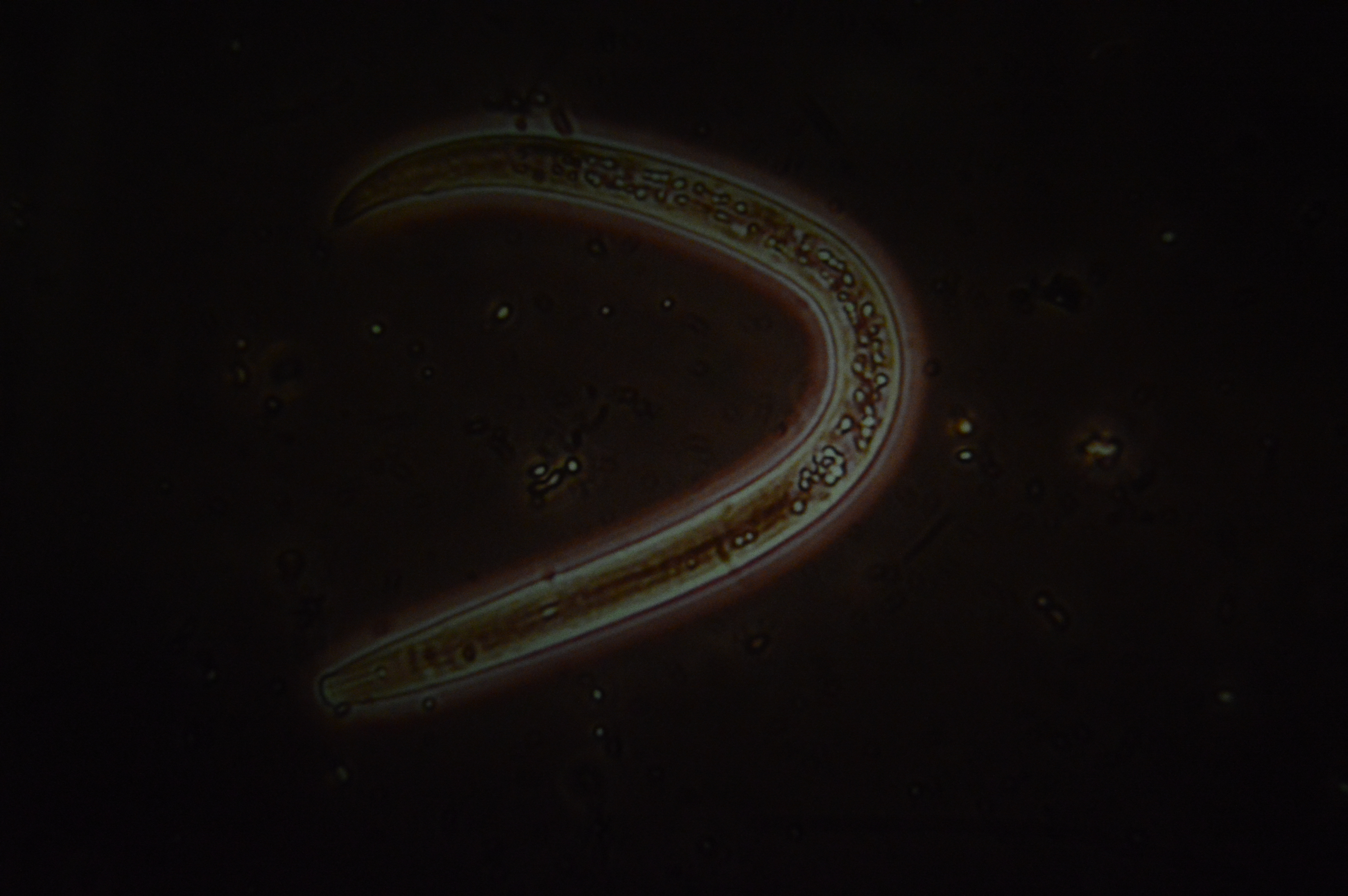
- Rotylenchulus reniformis

Scientific classification
- Domain: Eukaryota
- Kingdom: Animalia
- Phylum: Nematoda
- Class: Secernentea
- Subclass: Tylenchia
- Order: Tylenchida
- Family: Hoplolaimidae
- Subfamily: Rotylenchulinae
- Genus: Rotylenchulus; Linford & Oliveira, 1940

Species
- See text

Synonyms
- Leiperotylenchus Manohar Das, 1960; Spirotylenchus Lordella & Cesnik, 1958; Spyrotylenchus Lordello & Cesnik, 1958

= Rotylenchulus =

Genus of nematodes

Rotylenchulus is a genus of nematodes in the family Hoplolaimidae. They are mostly found in tropical and subtropical areas where they are semi-endoparasites of the roots of herbaceous and woody plants. Species are known to infest a wide range of plants including wheat, sunflowers and grapes.

== Species ==
Molecular characteristics provide important diagnostic tools, particularly since there is high intraspecific variability in immature females. The following species are recognised:

- Rotylenchulus anamictus
- Rotylenchulus borealis Loof & Oostenbrink, 1962
- Rotylenchulus clavicaudatus
- Rotylenchulus leptus
- Rotylenchulus macrodoratus Dasgupta et al., 1968
- Rotylenchulus macrosoma Dasgupta et al., 1968
- Rotylenchulus macrosomoides
- Rotylenchulus parvus Williams, 1960
- Rotylenchulus reniformis Linford & Oliveira, 1940
- Rotylenchulus sacchari
- Rotylenchulus variabilis
