= Hoplolaimus columbus =

Scientific classification
- Domain: Eukaryota
- Kingdom: Animalia
- Phylum: Nematoda
- Class: Secernentea
- Order: Tylenchida
- Family: Hoplolaimidae
- Genus: Hoplolaimus
- Species: H. columbus

Binomial name
- Hoplolaimus columbus Sher, (1963)

Species of roundworm

Hoplolaimus columbus is a plant pathogenic nematode.

== See also ==
- List of soybean diseases
- List of tea diseases
- List of mango diseases
- List of cotton diseases
