= Scutellonema bradys =

Scientific classification
- Kingdom: Animalia
- Phylum: Nematoda
- Class: Secernentea
- Order: Tylenchida
- Family: Hoplolaimidae
- Genus: Scutellonema
- Species: S. bradys

Binomial name
- Scutellonema bradys (Steiner & LeHew, 1933)

Species of roundworm

Scutellonema bradys, also known as yam nematode, is a migratory endoparasitic nematode causing major damage to yam (Dioscorea spp.) crop in many African tropical regions, as well in parts of South and Central America and Asia. They can cause reduction of 20-30% in tuber weight at harvest.

This nematode is able to multiply in dry conditions causing complete rotting tubers, called dry rot, which decreases the commercial value of the tubers. Dry rot of yam occurs in the outer 1–2 cm of tubers. Symptoms of dry rot of yam include necrotic lesions beneath the skin, followed by yellow lesions below the outer skin of the tuber. External cracks appear in the skin of the tuber.

The infections created by the nematode can serve as external opening facilitating fungi and bacteria colonization, causing wet rot. S. bradys feeds and reproduce in yams stored after harvest. Infested yam tubers are greatly damaged as a result of the continued reproduction of nematode.

== Morphological description ==
S. bradys belongs to the family Hoplolaimidae and is described as vermiform nematode when mature, measuring about 1 mm in length with a well-developed stylet. The body of the female has a length of 987.1 ± 16.2 μm. The stylet is rounded basal knobs with the anterior portion of the spear tapering toward the end of the front half of the spear length. The esophageal glands elongate and overlap the intestine dorsal-laterally. The males have body shape similar to female with 983 ± 14.3 μm. The testes are outstretched, with a visible large bursa enclosing the tail.

== Reproduction and life cycle ==
Eggs are laid in soil or plant tissue where they hatch and the juveniles develop into adults by moulting. Typically, it infects the young tubers through the tissues of the tuber growing point, alongside emerging roots and shoots, through roots and also through cracks or damaged areas in the tuber skin. The nematode feed intracellularly in the tuber tissue, causing rupture of cell wall, loss of cell contents and the formation of cavities. The cycle lasts 21 days and under favorable conditions can greatly increase its population. The S. bradys populations are affected by storage conditions and increase at twice the rate in tubers stored at 22–32 °C and relative humidity 40–85 %, when compared to tubers stored at 16–18 °C. The principal mean of dissemination of S. bradys is through yams that are propagated from whole tubers.

== Host range ==
Although yam is considered to be the main host to S. bradys, cowpea (Vigna unguiculata), sesame (Sesamum indicum), tomato (Solanum lycopersicum) and potato (Solanum tuberosum) have been reported to allow the nematode reproduction. Siam weed (Chromolaena odorata), roselle (Hibiscus sabdariffa), yam bean (Sphenostylis stenocarpa), and pigeon pea (Cajanus cajan) are also considered moderate hosts.

== Management ==
There are basically three methods that can be applied for management of S. bradys:

1. controlling nematodes in the field;
2. using nematode-free material or treatment of seed tubers and
3. tuber treatment after harvest to prevent storage losses.

=== Cultural practices ===
Using non- or poor crop host in rotation, intercropping or as cover crop with yam will help reduce the nematode population in the soil. In a recent study, the use of porcupine jointvetch (Aeschynomene histrix), Mexican marigold (Tagetes erecta), stylo (Stylosanthes guianensis), velvet bean (Mucuna pruriens) and kudzu (Pueraria phaseoloide) intercropped with yam have shown to potential to reduce S. bradys population. Similarly, the exclusion of weed hosts such as Eupatorium, Synedrella and Chromolaena, will help to reduce nematode damage.

The use of nematode-free propagative material is the most appropriate method to prevent nematode damage. Seed tubers should be examined before planting and the ones showing symptoms of dry rot should not be used. In tubes not showing obvious external symptoms of damage, it is necessary to scrape away the surface layers to determine the presence of dry rot.

=== Hot water treatment ===
Studies have shown that treating tubers with hot water (50-55 °C) for up to 40 min gives the best control of S. bradys, without damaging the tubers. This method it is not broadly used because of the cost, labor and difficulties of maintaining constant temperatures.

=== Resistance and tolerance ===
Full resistance to S. bradys has not been found in landraces or accessions examined in two of main species D. alata and D. rotundata. D. dumetorum is generally considered to be less readily invaded than other species.

=== Chemical treatment ===
Chemical control has shown some success in reducing S. bradys population. Four granular nematicides (aldicarb, oxamyl, carbofuran and miral) applied as post-plant sidedressing treatments effectively reduced the nematode population during the growing season and significantly increased yield without toxic accumulation in the harvested tubers.
