= Brasiliomyces malachrae =

Scientific classification
- Kingdom: Fungi
- Division: Ascomycota
- Class: Leotiomycetes
- Order: Helotiales
- Family: Erysiphaceae
- Genus: Brasiliomyces
- Species: B. malachrae

Binomial name
- Brasiliomyces malachrae (Seaver) Boesew. (1980)

Synonyms
- Erysiphe malachrae Seaver (1926); Salmonia malachrae (Seaver) S.Blumer & E.Müll. (1964)

Species of fungus

Brasiliomyces malachrae is a species of fungus in the family Erysiphaceae. It is a plant pathogen that grows on Gossypium, Lavatera assurgentiflora, Malachra capitata, Malvastrum coromandelianum, and species of Malvaceae. It is found in South America.

== Taxonomy and phylogeny ==
Brasiliomyces malachrae was named after its origin country of Brazil and has the suffix "-myces" in the name. The suffix "-myces" is derived from the Greek "mykēt-" meaning "mushroom". When discovered, it was found growing on Malvastrum coromandelianum, using it as a host . B. malchrae was first depicted in "Scientific survey of porto rico and the Virgin Islands, vol. VIII, Part 1. Botany of Porto Rico and the Virgin Islands. Mycology" authored by C.E. Chardon and J.F. Seaver.

Brasiliomyces malchrae belongs to the genus Brasiliomyces and is part of the family Erysiphaceae. Phylogenetic analysts using rRNA gene sequencing placed B. malachrae between the groups Golovinomyceteae and Erysiphe. It is closely related to B. chiangmaiensis, B. entadae, and B. setosus.

== Morphology ==
Brasiliomyces malachrae forms white colonies made of superficial mycelium on its host's leaves. These colonies grow scattered along the surface of the foliage, giving it a powdery mildew appearance. B. malachrae is an Ascomycota species, which is characterized by having ascospores that are found within an ascocarp. Powdery mildews form fruiting bodies known as chasmothecia (cleistothecia), which are considered overwintering organs. These organs give the fungus an advantage by allowing it to survive during the winter season when temperatures drop making survival difficult or during a dry season when resources are limited. For this particular species, every cleistothecium contains sac-like, asci (singular: ascus). Each asci contains 3-5 oval shaped ascospores with 5 being the most common.

Brasiliomyces is distinguished from all other Erysiphales because of its "thin, semitransparent chasmothecia peridia" which is made of a single cell layer. In addition, it is ecologically unique for being the only species of powdery mildew that forms abundant ascocarps in tropical climates.

Brasiliomyces malachrae has two sexual forms, the sexual and asexual morphs. The asexual morph is known to have hyaline ectophytic mycelium and catenescent conidia (singular: conidium). The mycelium for this morph is found present on the leaves, petioles and stems of plants. The sexual morph is known to form white chasmothecia which cover the surface of its host's leaves.

== Ecology ==
Brasiliomyces malachrae is an obligate biotroph of plants and is known to have 10,000 host species in angiosperms. It gets its energy and nutrients by parasitizing flowering plants related to false mallows (Malvaceae) and oak trees. Powdery mildews are plant pathogens known to cause polycyclic diseases which damage a plant's ability to photosynthesize. This type of infection causes a decrease in plant growth and an increase in the rate at which the host's tissues deteriorate. Its geographic distribution is subject to tropical areas, particularly in South America. B. malachrae is found in abundance in areas of Brazil, Venezuela, Chile and Puerto Rico.

== Biology and relevance for humans ==
Brasiliomyces malachrae has an economical impact on human life because it infects wild and cultivated cotton. Like other plant pathogens, powdery mildews cause significant decreases in crop yields and lowers the quality of the crops produced. It is unknown what other specific types of crops B. malachrae affects.
