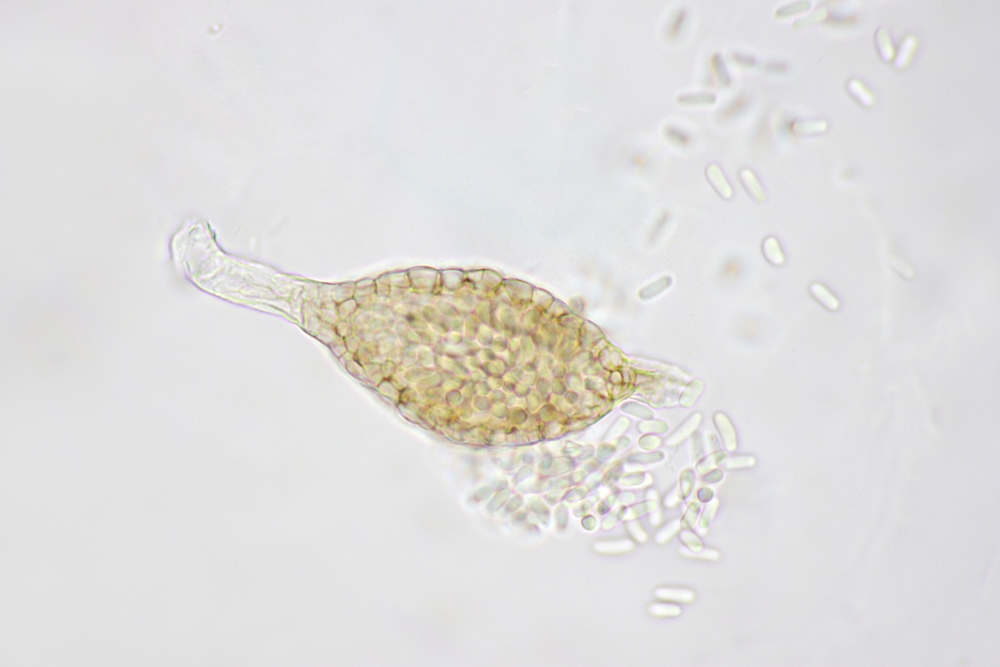
- Microscope image of Ampelomyces quisqualis

Scientific classification
- Kingdom: Fungi
- Division: Ascomycota
- Class: Dothideomycetes
- Order: Pleosporales
- Family: Phaeosphaeriaceae
- Genus: Ampelomyces; Ces. ex Schltdl

Type species
- Ampelomyces quisqualis

Species
- See text

= Ampelomyces =

Genus of fungi

Ampelomyces is a genus of mycoparasitic fungi in the family Phaeosphaeriaceae. Ampelomyces parasitizes the group of fungal plant pathogens known as powdery mildews (Erysiphales). The type species is Ampelomyces quisqualis which was circumscribed by Italian botanist Vincenzo de Cesati in Klotzsch, Bot. Ztg. vol.10 on page 301 in 1852.

== Species ==
As accepted by Species Fungorum;

- Ampelomyces abelmoschi (Bubák) Rudakov (1979)
- Ampelomyces abramovii Teterevn.-Babajan & Nelen (1975)
- Ampelomyces artemisiae (Voglino) Rudakov (1979)
- Ampelomyces bremiphagus (Naumov) Rudakov (1979)
- Ampelomyces epilobii (Ferraris) Rudakov (1979)
- Ampelomyces heraclei (Dejeva) Rudakov (1979)
- Ampelomyces humuli (Fautrey) Rudakov (1979)
- Ampelomyces novoae (Unamuno) Rudakov (1979)
- Ampelomyces parasiticus (Cocc.) Rudakov (1979)
- Ampelomyces phlomidis (Dejeva) Rudakov (1979)
- Ampelomyces plantaginis (Oudem.) Rudakov (1979)
- Ampelomyces polygoni (Potebnia) Rudakov (1979)
- Ampelomyces quisqualis Ces. (1852)
- Ampelomyces sporophagus (Golovin) Rudakov (1979)
- Ampelomyces ulicis (J. Adams) Rudakov (1979)
- Ampelomyces uncinulae (Fautrey) Rudakov (1979)

Former species;

- A. euonymi-japonici (Arcang.) Rudakov (1979) = Cicinobolus euonymi-japonicae, Phaeosphaeriaceae
- A. quercinus (Syd. & P. Syd.) Rudakov (1979) = Nothophoma quercina, Didymellaceae
