= Volney Morgan Spalding =

American botnist (1849–1918)

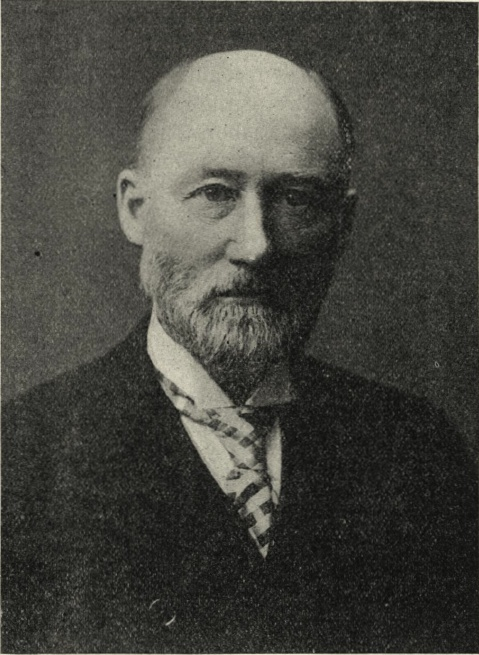

Volney Morgan Spalding (January 29, 1849 – November 12, 1918) was an American botanist affiliated with the University of Michigan for twenty-eight years, and for most of this period was head of the botany department.

Spalding was born in East Bloomfield, New York, the son of Frederick Austin and Almira (Shaw) Spalding. His father was of English descent and his mother of Scotch-Irish descent. He received a preliminary education in the public schools of Gorham, New York, and Ann Arbor, Michigan. He entered the University of Michigan in 1869 and was graduated Bachelor of Arts in 1873. His further preparation for professional life included work in Cryptogamic and Physiological Botany at Harvard University, in Anatomy at Cornell, in Histology at the University of Pennsylvania, and in Plant Physiology at the University of Jena.

The years from 1892 to 1894 he spent at the University of Leipzig, where he received the degree of Doctor of Philosophy at the conclusion of his studies. The years from 1873 to 1876 were spent in public school work, first as principal of the Battle Creek High School, and later of the Flint High School. He was called to the University of Michigan in 1876, and filled the following positions successively: Instructor in Zoology and Botany, 1876–1879; Assistant Professor of Botany, 1879–1881; Acting Professor of Botany, 1881–1886; Professor of Botany, 1886–1904. He resigned his professorship in 1904 to reside in a more salubrious climate, and became connected with the Desert Botanical Laboratory of the Carnegie Institution, at Tucson, Arizona, with his wife Effie A. Southworth.

He is the author of "Guide to the Study of Common Plants and Introduction to Botany" (1894), and of a large number of papers in the scientific journals. He was a member of the Michigan Academy of Science, and was its president in 1898. He was also a Fellow of the American Association for the Advancement of Science, a member of the Association Internationale des Botanistes, and an honorary member of the Society of American Foresters. He was married in 1876 to Harriet Hubbard; and some years after her death, to botanist Effie A. Southworth.

The standard author abbreviation Spalding is used to indicate this person as the author when citing a botanical name.
