= Puccinia cacabata =

Scientific classification
- Domain: Eukaryota
- Kingdom: Fungi
- Division: Basidiomycota
- Class: Pucciniomycetes
- Order: Pucciniales
- Family: Pucciniaceae
- Genus: Puccinia
- Species: P. cacabata

Binomial name
- Puccinia cacabata Arthur & Holw. (1925)

Species of fungus

Puccinia cacabata (southwestern cotton rust) is a fungal species and plant pathogen that causes rust on cotton. It was originally found on the leaves of Chloris ciliata (fringed windmill grass) in Bolivia.

== Description ==
he first disease symptom on cotton is the appearance of small, somewhat inconspicuous, pale-green lesions which are the first sign of disease. The lesions then develop into bright yellow spermogonial (conceptacle containing spermatia) pustules, usually on the upper leaf surfaces of the host plant. Spermogonial pustules may also appear on any of the above-ground plant parts, such as the stems. Within about 10 days of spermogonium formation, cup-like aecia (spore reproductive structures) erupt through the lower leaf epidermis. The aecia are large and can easily be observed. They appear as orange-yellow, circular, and slightly raised lesions produced on the lower leaf surfaces, bracts, green bolls and stems of cotton plants. Severe infections may cause defoliation and dwarfing of bolls. Infection of cotton seedlings may cause death. The first symptoms on grama grass are small, pale-brown uredinial lesions on the leaves. The telia are produced on grama grass either in the uredinium (pustules) or separately as dark-brown to black raised pustules.

== See also ==
- List of Puccinia species
