= Brasiliomyces =

Scientific classification
- Kingdom: Fungi
- Division: Ascomycota
- Class: Leotiomycetes
- Order: Helotiales
- Family: Erysiphaceae
- Genus: Brasiliomyces; Viégas (1944)

Type species
- Brasiliomyces malvastri Viégas (1944)

Genus of fungi

Brasiliomyces is a genus of fungi in the family Erysiphaceae. The widely distributed genus contains seven species.

== Species ==
- Brasiliomyces cyclobalanopsidis
- Brasiliomyces entadae
- Brasiliomyces kumaonensis
- Brasiliomyces malachrae
- Brasiliomyces malvastri
- Brasiliomyces setosus
- Brasiliomyces trina
