= Cotton leaf curl virus =

Cotton leaf curl viruses

Scientific classification
- (unranked): Virus
- Realm: Floreoviria
- Kingdom: Shotokuvirae
- Phylum: Cressdnaviricota
- Class: Repensiviricetes
- Order: Geplafuvirales
- Family: Geminiviridae
- Genus: Begomovirus

Groups included
- Cotton leaf curl Alabad virus; Cotton leaf curl Bangalore virus; Cotton leaf curl Barasat virus; Cotton leaf curl Gezira virus; Cotton leaf curl Kokhran virus; Cotton leaf curl Multan virus

Cladistically included but traditionally excluded taxa
- All other Begomovirus species

Species of virus

Cotton leaf curl viruses (CLCuV) are a number of plant pathogenic virus species of the family Geminiviridae.

In Asia and Africa the major disease of cotton is caused by the Cotton leaf curl geminivirus (CLCuV). Leaves of infected cotton curl upward and bear leaf-like enations on the underside along with vein thickening. Plants infected early in the season are stunted and yield is reduced drastically. (A. Nadeem and Z. Xiong, University of Arizona) This virus devastated the Pakistan cotton industry in early 1990s where it caused an estimated yield reduction of 30-35%.

== Description ==
White flies (Bemisia tabaci) transmit the virus; plant to plant or seed transmission has not been observed. The virus is a circular single strand DNA virus subtending six proteins. All Begomovirus species causing cotton leaf curl disease have geminate particles, approximately 18-20 nm in diameter and 30 nm long and a circular, single-stranded DNA genome. All except Cotton leaf crumple virus have a monopartite genome, with all viral products required for replication, systemic movement and whitefly transmission encoded on a single DNA component of c. 2.75 kB (DNA A). The genome of CLCrV is bipartite. Two smaller, circular, single-stranded DNA molecules, named DNA 1 and DNA β, are associated with a range of monopartite begomoviruses from the Old World including the cotton leaf curl viruses. These molecules are regarded as satellite molecules as they depend on the helper begomovirus to support one or more stages of their infection cycle (movement and insect transmission for both molecules and, additionally, replication in the case of DNA β). DNA β is symptom-modulating and typical cotton leaf curl disease symptoms only develop when this molecule is present: in the absence of DNA β, the concentration of viral DNA (DNA A) is low and the symptoms of infection very mild. DNA β has a single open reading frame (βC1 ORF), which encodes a suppressor of RNA silencing. DNA 1 is homologous to the DNA-R component of the nanoviruses and encodes a master replication initiator (M-Rep) protein but its presence does not alter symptom expression. (Corresponding author: Dr Andrew Geering 2007)

== Plant defense ==
The cotton genome contains resistance genes, namely R1CLCuDhir and R2CLCuDhi, which provide resistance to pathogen transmission via cell death in cells neighboring infected cells. In addition the βC1protein indirectly interferes with plant hormone signaling which results in clustering of the virally infected cells. The plant resistance to against CLCuV was described by Ali (1997, 1999) that the CLCuV resistance was controlled by single dominate gene, and could be transferred to any cultivar by using back cross technique.

== Epidemics ==
CLCuV was first described in 1967 in Multan, Pakistan. The virus turned epidemic in Pakistan in the 1992-1993 growing season causing the yield to decline to 8.04 million bales, a 29% decrease from the previous year. In the 1993-1994 growing season, the yield decreased to 9.05 million bales, a 10% decrease. The disease spread north and west through Pakistan's fields. Between 1992 and 1997, the losses in Pakistan cotton yield is calculated to be approximately five billion dollars. Similarly, the virus has impacted cotton production in India, particularly the northwest, through 2018.

== Prevention and control ==
1. Use resistant or tolerant cultivars
2. Protect seedlings from whiteflies
3. Use only good seeds and healthy transplants
4. Control whiteflies
5. Immediately remove infected-looking plants and bury them
6. Control weeds
7. Do not plant cotton near tomato and/or other crops susceptible to whiteflies or vice-versa.
8. Use acephate-imidacloprid at 50% - 1.8% respectively, at every seven days.
9. Plow-under all plant debris after harvest or burn them when possible
10. Practice crop rotation by planting crops that are not susceptible to whitefly
