= Oidiopsis gossypii =

Scientific classification
- Kingdom: Fungi
- Division: Ascomycota
- Class: Leotiomycetes
- Order: Helotiales
- Family: Erysiphaceae
- Genus: Leveillula
- Species: L. gossypii

Binomial name
- Leveillula gossypii (Wakef.) Raych., (1950)

Synonyms
- Ovulariopsis gossypii Wakef. 1920

Species of fungus

Oidiopsis gossypii is a plant pathogen.
