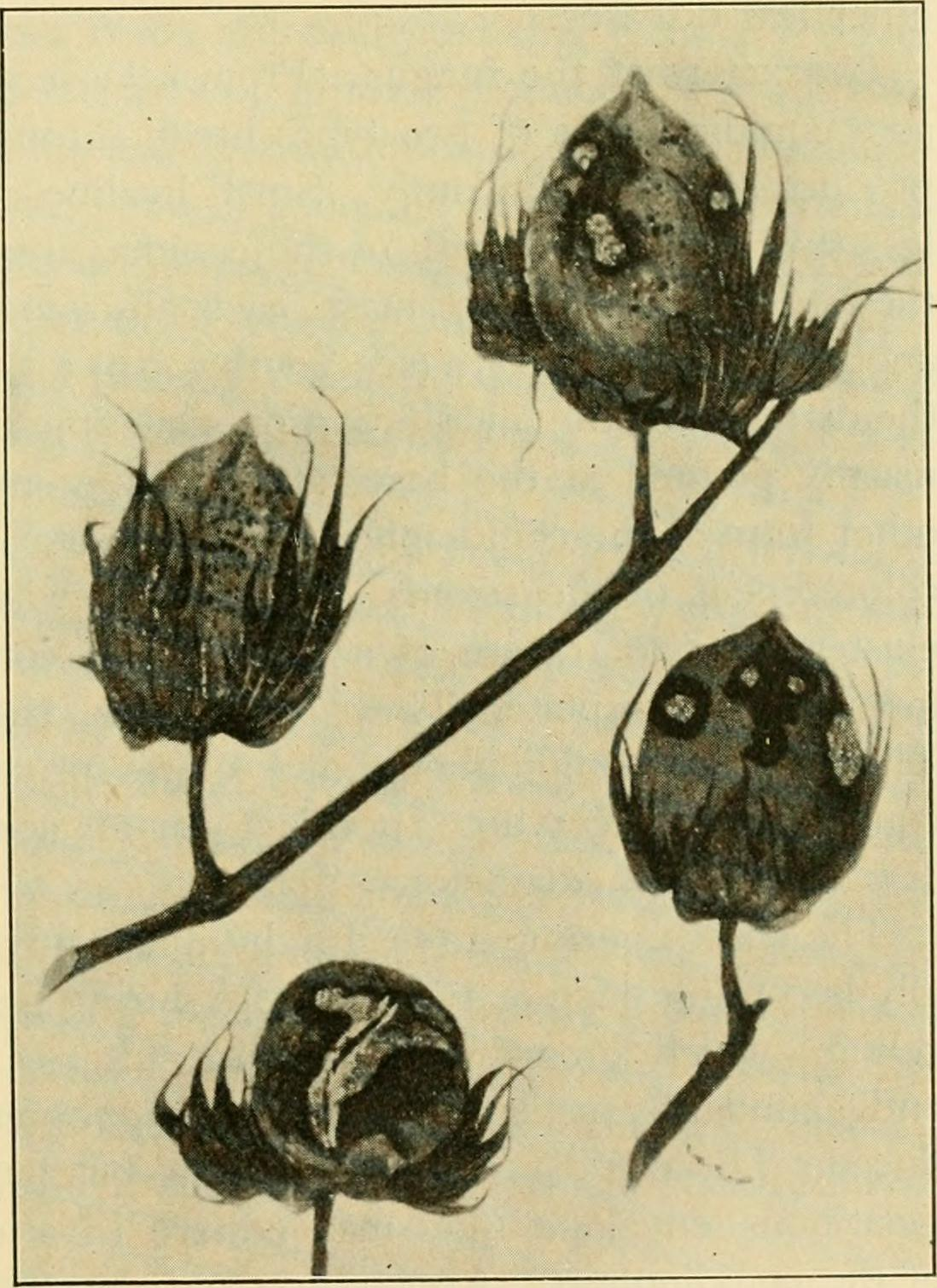
- Colletotrichum gossypii on cotton

Scientific classification
- Kingdom: Fungi
- Division: Ascomycota
- Class: Sordariomycetes
- Order: Glomerellales
- Family: Glomerellaceae
- Genus: Colletotrichum
- Species: C. gossypii

Binomial name
- Colletotrichum gossypii Southw. (1891)

Synonyms
- Glomerella gossypii Edgerton (1909)

= Colletotrichum gossypii =

Species of fungus

Colletotrichum gossypii is a plant pathogen. This fungus is affiliated with cotton plants where it causes anthracnose. Its reproduction in the plants is asexual. The conidia have only one nucleus. Before conidia germination fusion by mean of conidial anastomosis tube could happen. The conidia could germinate in media plates.
