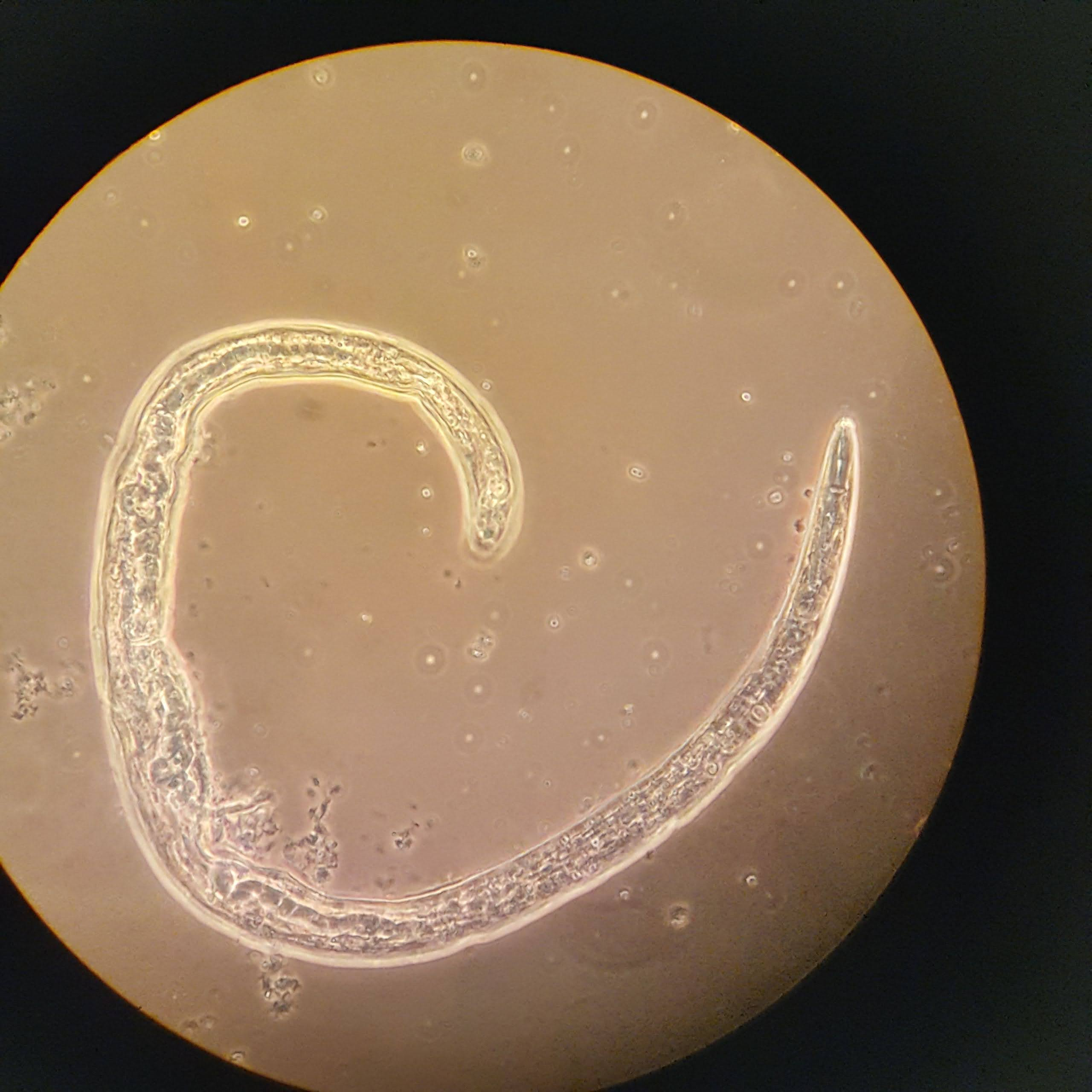
- Helicotylenchus

Scientific classification
- Kingdom: Animalia
- Phylum: Nematoda
- Class: Secernentea
- Order: Tylenchida
- Family: Hoplolaimidae
- Genus: Helicotylenchus; Steiner, 1945

= Helicotylenchus =

Genus of roundworms

Helicotylenchus is a genus of nematodes in the family Hoplolaimidae. They are known generally as spiral nematodes. They are found worldwide because they can live and survive in a wide range of habitats. They are among the most common parasitic nematodes of plants; found in corn, bananas, grass, soybeans.

== Description ==
The female is wormlike and straight or spiral-shaped. The male is similar, but with a smaller anterior end. The body may take a spiral shape after death, if not in life. This habitus mortis gives the nematodes their common name.

== Behavior ==
Most are ectoparasites of plant roots.. They insert their stylets into root epidermis to feed. Some species live half-buried in the root tissue, and others penetrate the root and live inside. They lay eggs on, around, or inside the roots, and within two or three days the juveniles emerge to feed. The genus is found on a wide variety of host plant taxa. Males can be rare, suggesting the nematode often reproduces by parthenogenesis.

Most species are not very damaging to the plant. Nematodes of this genus have been noted to be ubiquitous in soil samples in Florida with no plant damage nearby. Four species out of over 200 are known as destructive plant pests that suppress plant growth: H. dihystera, H. multicinctus, H. pseudorobustus, and H. digonicus. A few others are potential pests.

== Impacts ==
Plants infested with aggressive species may become stunted and yellowed, but usually there is no sign of infestation in the herbage. An exception is in parasitism by H. multicinctus, which can cause enough root necrosis that it seriously weakens the plant. This species may be the most economically important, occurring in crops such as bananas of the Cavendish group. Other species have caused occasional damage to maize and Kentucky bluegrass.

== Species ==
There are over 200 species. They can be difficult to tell apart because many species are very similar, individuals in a particular species can be variable, and species bounds are not entirely clear. Genetic analysis has helped to define several clades within the genus.

Species include:

- Helicotylenchus canadensis Waseem, 1961
- Helicotylenchus depressus Yeates, 1976
- Helicotylenchus dihystera (Cobb, 1893) Sher, 1961
- Helicotylenchus labiatus
- Helicotylenchus multicinctus (Cobb, 1893) Golden, 1956
- Helicotylenchus pseudorobustus
- Helicotylenchus varicaudatus
- Helicotylenchus vulgaris Yuen, 1964
