= Forrest Shreve =

American botanist (1878–1950)

- Born: July 8, 1878; Easton, Maryland, U.S.
- Died: July 19, 1950 (aged 72); Tucson, Arizona, U.S.
- Education: Johns Hopkins University
- Scientific career
- Workplaces: Goucher College; Carnegie Institution for Science
- Author abbrev. (botany): F. Shreve

Forrest Shreve (July 8, 1878 – July 19, 1950) was an internationally known American botanist. His professional career was devoted to the study of the distribution of vegetation as determined by soil and climate conditions. His contributions to the plant biology world set the groundwork for modern studies and his books are regarded as classics by botanists worldwide.

== Early life and education ==
Shreve, the son of Henry and Helen Garrison Shreve, was born in Easton, Maryland. After receiving his preparatory education at George School, in Newtown, Pennsylvania, Shreve earned his BA at Johns Hopkins University in 1901. He earned his Ph.D. from the same university in 1905. From 1904 to 1908, Shreve conducted a botanical survey of the state of Maryland.

== Career ==
From 1905 to 1906, and again in 1909, Shreve studied the mountain vegetation of Jamaica. In 1906, he became an associate professor of botany at Goucher College, and remained there until 1908, when he moved to Tucson, Arizona, to work at the Carnegie Institution of Washington's Desert Library. From 1911 to 1919, Shreve worked as an editor of the botanical scientific journal Plant World. In 1914, Shreve published his book A Montane Rain-forest. In 1915, he helped found the Ecological Society of America, where he served as a secretary-treasurer until 1919, and as president, in 1921. In 1926, Shreve worked as an editor of the book Naturalist's Guide to the Americas. In 1928, Shreve was placed in charge of Desert Investigations of the Carnegie Institution, and in 1932 he began floristics studies on the Sonoran Desert region. He served as vice president of the Association of American Geographers in 1940, and published "The Desert Vegetation of North America" in Botanical Review. He retired in 1946.

== Personal life ==
His religious affiliation was with the Society of Friends. Politically, he was a Republican. His hobby was collecting and studying stamps. He married Edith Coffin on June 17, 1909 in Florence, AL (aged 30), and had a daughter, Margaret. He died in Tucson, Arizona in 1950.

== Publications ==
- The Plant Life of Maryland. The Johns Hopkins Press. 1910.
- A Montane Rain-forest: A Contribution to the Physiological Plant Geography in Jamaica. Carnegie Institute of Washington. Washington D.C: 1914.
- The Vegetation of a Desert Mountain Range as Conditioned by Climatic Factors. Carnegie Institute of Washington. Washington D.C.: 1915.
- Naturalist's Guide to the Americas (editor). 1926.
- The Cactus and its Home. The Williams & Wilkins company. 1931.
- "The Desert Vegetation of North America". The Botanical Review. Vol. 8, No. 4 (Apr., 1942), pp. 195–246.
- Vegetation and Flora of the Sonoran Desert (posthumously). Stanford University Press. 1964.
