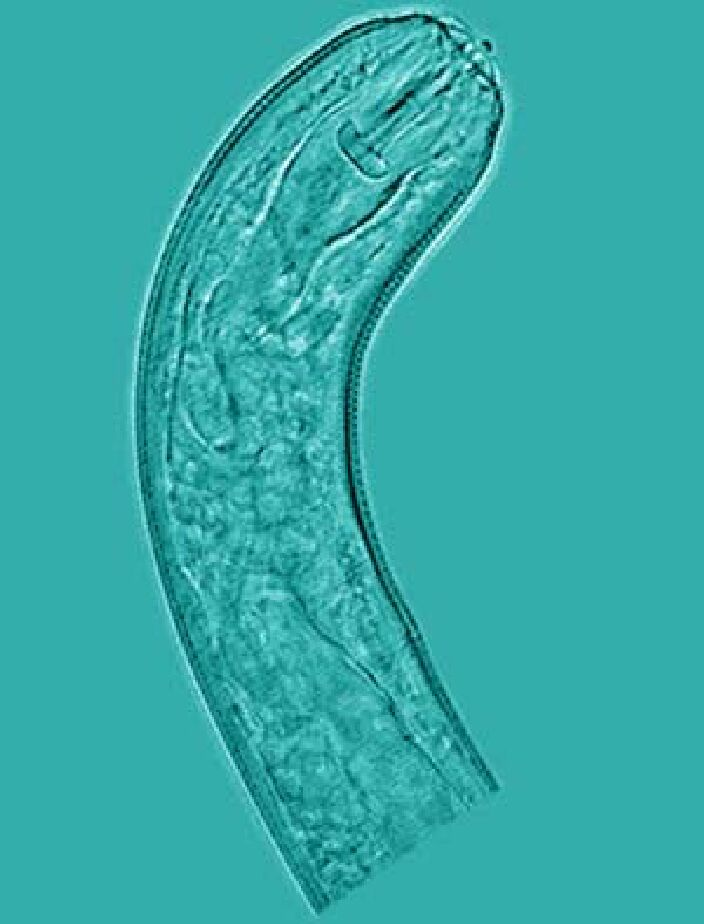
- Hoplolaimidae

Scientific classification
- Domain: Eukaryota
- Kingdom: Animalia
- Phylum: Nematoda
- Class: Secernentea
- Order: Tylenchida
- Family: Hoplolaimidae

= Hoplolaimidae =

Family of roundworms

Hoplolaimidae is a family of plant pathogenic nematodes. It has two subfamilies, Hoplolaiminae and Rotylenchulinae. Typically hoplolaimids are ecto- or semi endoparasites of higher plants.

== Subfamilies and genera in Hoplolaimidae ==
=== Type subfamily ===
Hoplolaiminae Filip'ev, 1934.

- Nemonchinae Skarbilovich, 1959
- Rotylenchoidinae Whitehead, 1958
- Aphasmatylenchinae Sher, 1965 (n. syn.)
- Rotylenchinae Golden, 1971 (n. syn.)
- Pararotylenchinae Baldwin & Bell, 1981 (n. syn.)

==== Genera ====
- Hoplolaimus von Daday, 1905
- Rotylenchus Filip'ev, 1936
- Helicotylenchus Steiner, 1945
- Scutellonema Andrâssy, 1958
- Aorolaimus Sher, 1963
- Aphasmatylenchus Sher, 1965
- Antarctylus Sher, 1973
- Pararotylenchus Baldwin & Bell, 1981

=== Other subfamily ===
Rotylenchulinae Husain & Khan, 1967

- Acontylinae Fotedar & Handoo, 1978

==== Genera ====
- Rotylenchulus Lindford & Oliveira, 1940
- Acontylus Meagher, 1968
- Senegalonema Germani, Luc & Baldwin, 1983
