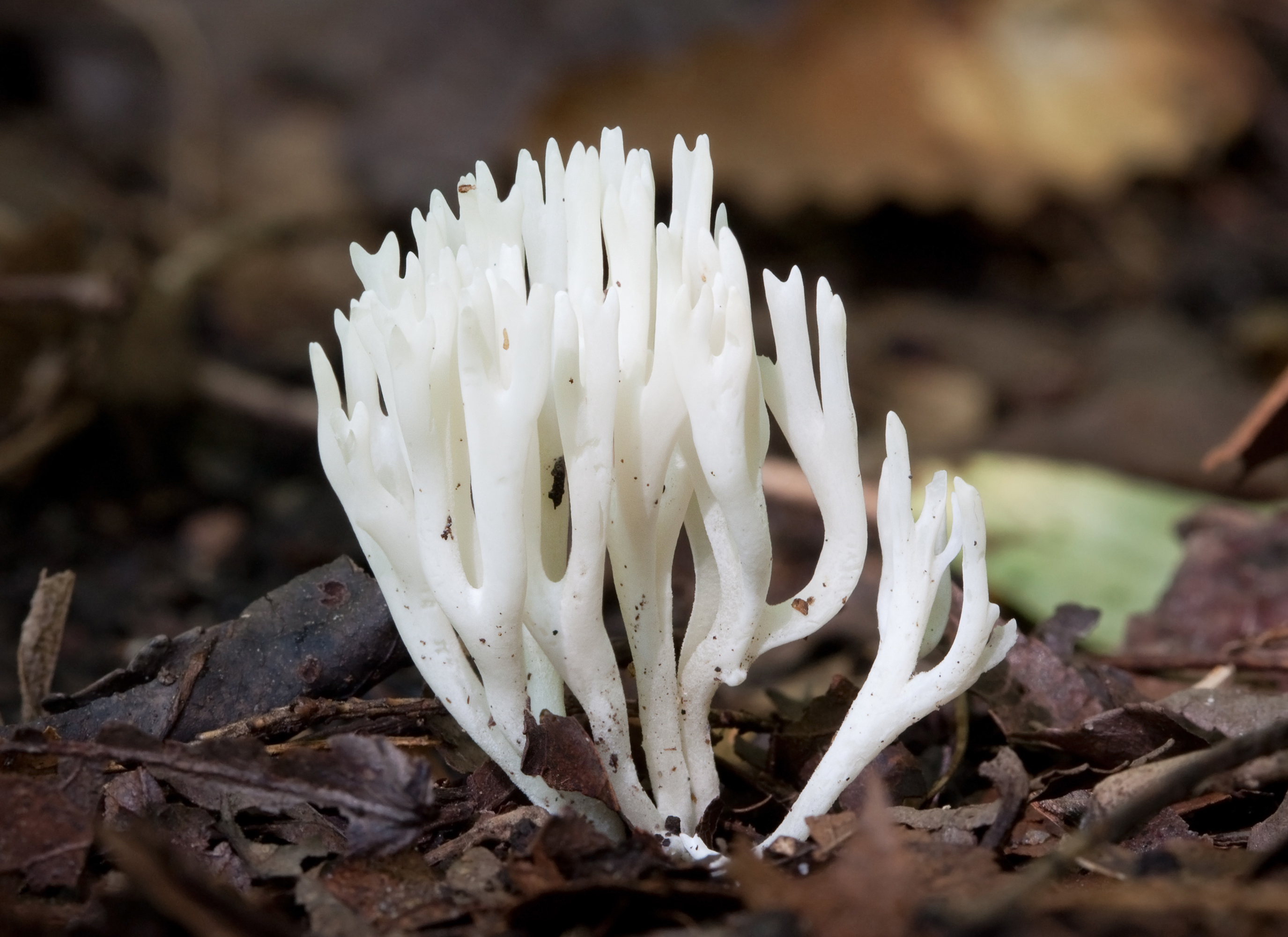

Scientific classification
- Kingdom: Fungi
- Division: Basidiomycota
- Class: Agaricomycetes
- Order: Agaricales
- Family: Clavariaceae
- Genus: Ramariopsis
- Species: R. kunzei

Binomial name
- Ramariopsis kunzei (Fr.) Corner (1950)

Synonyms
- Species synonymy: Clavaria kunzei Fr. (1821); Clavaria chionea Pers. (1822); Clavaria subcorticalis Schwein. (1832); Clavaria krombholzii Fr. (1838); Lachnocladium subsimile Berk. & M.A.Curtis (1873); Ramaria kunzei (Fr.) Quél. (1888); Clavaria velutina Ellis & Everh. (1888); Clavulina kunzei (Fr.) J.Schröt. (1888); Ramaria favrei Quél. (1894); Clavaria asperula G.F.Atk. (1908); Clavaria asperulans G.F.Atk. (1908); Clavaria lentofragilis G.F.Atk. (1908); Clavaria elongata Britzelm. (1909); Clavaria favrei (Quél.) Sacc. & Traverso (1912); Clavaria subcaespitosa Peck (1913); Lachnocladium subcorticale (Schwein.) Burt (1922); Ramariopsis lentofragilis (G.F.Atk.) R.H.Petersen (1969); Clavulinopsis kunzei (Fr.) Jülich (1985)

= Ramariopsis kunzei =

Species of fungus

Ramariopsis kunzei Mycological characteristics
- Smooth hymenium
- No distinct cap
- Hymenium attachment is irregular or not applicable
- Spore print is white
- Ecology is mycorrhizal
- Edibility is edible

Ramariopsis kunzei is an edible species of coral fungi in the family Clavariaceae, and the type species of the genus Ramariopsis. It is commonly known as white coral because of the branched structure of the fruit bodies that resemble marine coral.

The fruit bodies are up to 5 cm (2 in) tall by 4 cm (1 1/2 in) wide, with numerous branches originating from a short rudimentary stem. The branches are one to two millimeters thick, smooth, and white, sometimes with yellowish tips in age.

Ramariopsis kunzei has a widespread distribution, and is found in North America, Eurasia, and Australia.

== Taxonomy ==
The species was first described as Clavaria kunzei by pioneer mycologist Elias Magnus Fries in 1821. E. J. H. Corner transferred the species to Ramariopsis in 1950, and made it the type species. In general, coral fungi often have extensive taxonomic histories, as mycologists have not agreed on the best way to classify them. In addition to Clavaria and Ramariopsis, the R. kunzei has been placed in the genera Ramaria by Lucien Quélet in 1888, and Clavulinopsis by Walter Jülich in 1985. According to the taxonomic database MycoBank, the species has acquired a sizable list of synonyms, listed in the taxobox. It is commonly known as white coral because of the branched structure of the fruit bodies that resemble marine coral.

A phylogenetic analysis of clavarioid fungi concluded that R. kunzei is in a phylogenetic lineage together with several Clavulinopsis species (including C. sulcata, C. helvola and C. fusiformis), and that this clade (the ramariopsis clade) is nested within a group of species representing the family Clavariaceae.

== Description ==
The fruit bodies are white to whitish-yellow in color, and are highly branched structures resembling coral; the dimensions are typically up to 8 cm (3.1 in) tall and 6 cm (2.4 in) wide. Older specimens may have a pinkish tinge. The tips of the branches are blunt, not crested as in some other species of coral fungi, like Clavulina cristata; branches are between 1 and 5 millimeters thick. The branch tips of mature specimens may be yellow. A stem, if present, may be up to 1 cm (0.4 in) long and scurfy—covered with small flakes or scales. The texture of the flesh may range from pliable to brittle. The odor and taste are not distinctive. This mushroom does not change color upon bruising or injury, but a 10% solution of FeSO_{4} (a chemical test known as "iron salts") will turn it green.

In deposit, the spores are white. Viewed with a light microscope, the spores are translucent and have an ellipsoid to roughly spherical shape with spines on the surface, and dimensions of 3–5.5 by 2.5–4.5 μm. Spores are non-amyloid, meaning that they do not absorb iodine when stained with Melzer's reagent. The spore-bearing cells, the basidia, are usually 25–45 μm long by 6–7 μm wide, and 4-spored. Clamp connections are present in the hyphae of this species.

=== Similar species ===
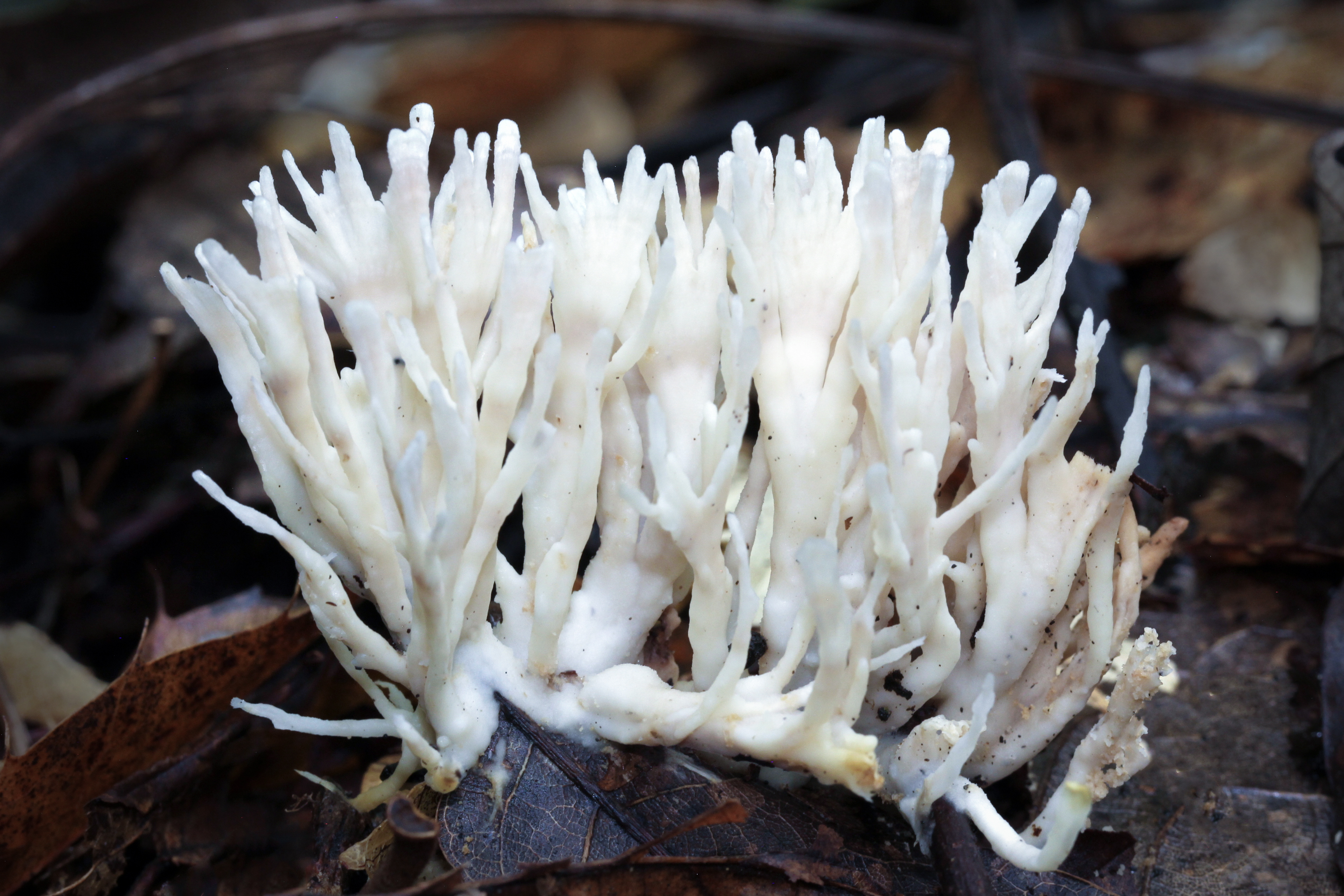
Sebacina schweinitzii is a lookalike species.

The "crested coral" (Clavulina cristata, edible) is similar in appearance to R. kunzei, but its branches have fringed, feathery tips. The "jellied false coral" (Tremellodendron pallidum, edible) has whitish, tough, cartilaginous branches with blunt tips. Ramariopsis lentofragilis (poisonous) is an eastern North American lookalike that causes severe abdominal pain, general weakness, and pain under the sternum.

Also similar are Artomyces pyxidatus, Clavulina cinerea, Clavulina rugosa, and Clavulinopsis corniculata.

== Habitat and distribution ==
The species is thought to be saprobic and is found growing on the ground, in duff, or less frequently on well-decayed wood. Fruit bodies may grow singly, in groups, or clustered together. David Arora has noted a preference for growing under conifers, as well as a prevalence in redwood forests of North America. In contrast, an earlier author claimed this species grows "rarely in coniferous woods."

In Europe, Ramariopsis kunzei has been collected in Scotland (specifically, on the islands of Arran, Gigha and Kintyre peninsula), the Netherlands, Norway, former Czechoslovakia, Germany, Poland, and Russia (Zhiguli Mountains). It has also been found in China, India, Iran, the Solomon Islands, and Australia. In North America, the distribution extends north to Canada, and includes the United States (including Hawaii and Puerto Rico).

== Edibility ==
The species is edible, but according to David Arora, "fleshless and flavorless".
