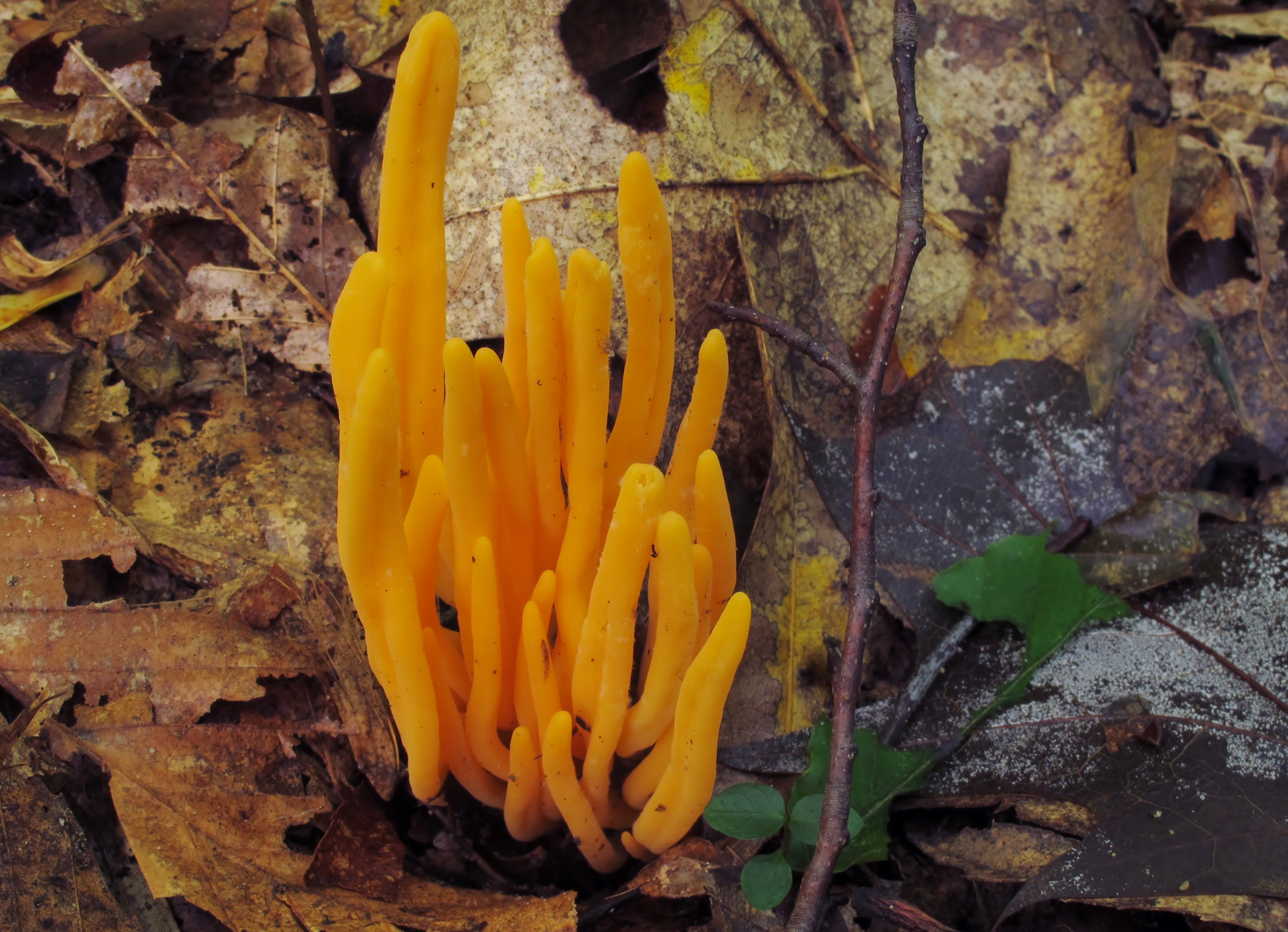
- Clavulinopsis aurantiocinnabarina, Pennsylvania

Scientific classification
- Domain: Eukaryota
- Kingdom: Fungi
- Division: Basidiomycota
- Class: Agaricomycetes
- Order: Agaricales
- Family: Clavariaceae
- Genus: Clavulinopsis
- Species: C. aurantiocinnabarina

Binomial name
- Clavulinopsis aurantiocinnabarina (Schwein.) Corner (1950)

Synonyms
- Clavaria aurantiocinnabarina Schwein. (1832)

= Clavulinopsis aurantiocinnabarina =

Species of fungus

Clavulinopsis aurantiocinnabarina is a clavarioid fungus in the family Clavariaceae. It has been given the English names of orange spindle coral or orange worm coral. It forms cylindrical, orange fruit bodies that grow on the ground in woodland litter. It was originally described from the United States and is part of a species complex as yet unresolved.

== Taxonomy ==
The species was originally described from Pennsylvania in 1832 by American mycologist Lewis David de Schweinitz. In 1950, it was placed in the genus Clavulinopsis by English mycologist E.J.H. Corner. Initial molecular research, based on cladistic analysis of DNA sequences, indicates that C. aurantiocinnabarina is part of a complex of related species.

== Description ==
The fruit body of Clavulinopsis aurantiocinnabarina is cylindrical, orange to orange-red, up to 80 x 6 mm, growing singly or in small clusters. Microscopically, the basidiospores are hyaline, smooth, globose to subglobose, 5.5 to 7 by 5 to 7 μm, with a small apiculus.

== Similar species ==
Clavulinopsis fusiformis is similarly shaped, but fruit bodies are yellow rather than orange and typically appear in dense, fasciculate (closely bunched) clusters. Clavulinopsis laeticolor is also yellow and can be distinguished by its ellipsoid spores. Clavulinopsis sulcata is closely related, but was originally described from Asia and has orange-pink fruit bodies.

== Distribution and habitat ==
The species was initially described from Pennsylvania, but its distribution is uncertain because of confusion with similar, closely related species several of which occur in eastern North America. The species complex is widespread within this area and C. aurantiocinnabarina sensu lato has also been reported from Central America and the Caribbean, Brazil, China, and Malaysia.

The species occurs singly or in small clusters on the ground and is presumed to be saprotrophic. It typically grows in woodland.
