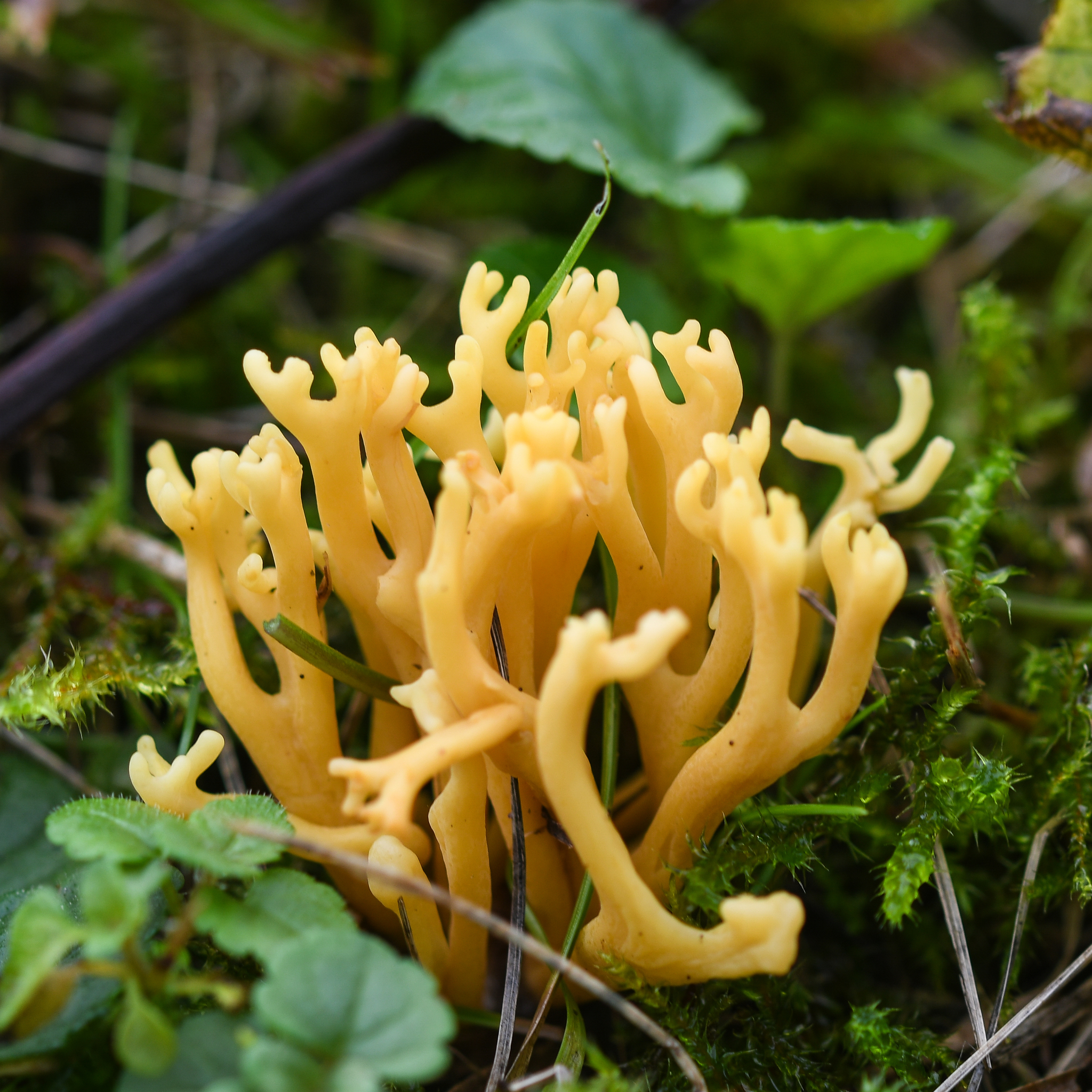

Scientific classification
- Kingdom: Fungi
- Division: Basidiomycota
- Class: Agaricomycetes
- Order: Agaricales
- Family: Clavariaceae
- Genus: Clavulinopsis
- Species: C. corniculata

Binomial name
- Clavulinopsis corniculata (Schaeff.) Corner (1950)

Synonyms
- Clavaria corniculata Schaeff. (1774); Ramariopsis corniculata (Schaeff.) R.H.Petersen (1978); Donkella corniculata (Schaeff.) Doty (1950)

= Clavulinopsis corniculata =

Species of fungus

Clavulinopsis corniculata
- Mycological characteristics
- Smooth hymenium
- No distinct cap
- Hymenium attachment is irregular or not applicable
- Stipe is bare
- Spore print is white
- Ecology is saprotrophic
- Edibility is unknown

Clavulinopsis corniculata is a clavarioid fungus in the family Clavariaceae. In the UK, it has the recommended English name of meadow coral. It forms branched, cylindrical, ochre fruit bodies that grow on the ground in agriculturally unimproved grassland or in woodland litter. It was originally described from Germany and is part of a species complex as yet unresolved.

== Taxonomy ==
The species was originally described from Germany in 1774 by German mycologist Jacob Christian Schäffer. In 1950, it was placed in the genus Clavulinopsis by English mycologist E. J. H. Corner. Initial molecular research, based on cladistic analysis of DNA sequences, indicates that C. corniculata is part of a complex of related species.

== Description ==
The fruit body of is ochre to deep yellow, up to 8 centimetres (3 in) tall, typically branched two or three times, with a distinct, often paler stem. Microscopically, the basidiospores are hyaline, smooth, globose to subglobose, 4.5 to 6 by 4.5 to 5.5 μm, with a large apiculus.

=== Similar species ===
In Europe, Clavulinopsis umbrinella is a similarly shaped species in the same habitat, but is typically pale brown without yellowish tints. Some species of Ramaria sensu lato are yellow to ochre and similarly shaped. They typically occur in woodland and can be separated by their ochre (not white) spore print.

== Distribution and habitat ==
The species was initially described from Europe, with a recent epitype from Slovakia. It is widely distributed throughout Europe, but has also been reported from North America, Central and South America, Africa, Asia, and Australia.

The species occurs singly or in troops on the ground and is presumed to be saprotrophic. In America and Asia it grows in woodland, but in Europe it generally occurs in agriculturally unimproved, short-sward grassland (pastures and lawns), from July to November. Such waxcap grasslands are a declining and threatened habitat, but C. corniculata is one of the commoner species and is not generally considered of conservation concern.

== Uses ==
Although too small to be of value, it is reported to be edible fresh, with the bitterness reduced through cooking and best mixed in as a garnish. It does not preserve well.
