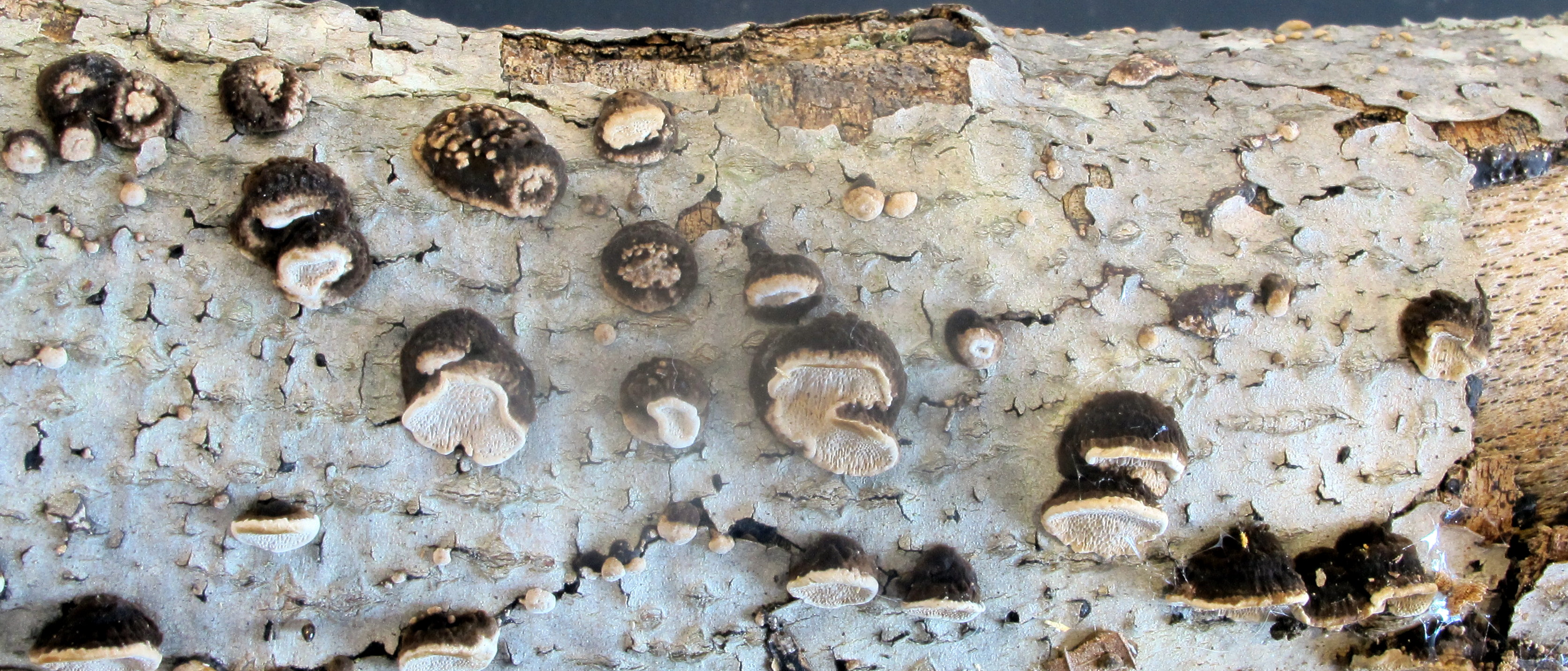

Scientific classification
- Kingdom: Fungi
- Division: Basidiomycota
- Class: Agaricomycetes
- Order: Polyporales
- Family: Polyporaceae
- Genus: Datroniella
- Species: D. scutellata

Binomial name
- Datroniella scutellata (Schwein.) B.K.Cui, Hai J.Li & Y.C.Dai (2014)

Synonyms
- Polyporus scutellatus Schwein. (1832)

= Datroniella scutellata =

Species of fungus

Datroniella scutellata is a species of fungus in the family Polyporaceae, and the type species of genus Datroniella.

== Taxonomy ==
The fungus was originally described in 1832 by German-American mycologist Lewis David de Schweinitz. He found the original collections in Bethlehem, New York, where it was growing on the branches and trunk of Syringa vulgaris. The fungus has been shuffled to many different polypore genera in its taxonomic history. Since the mid-1980s, it has largely been accepted in the genus Datronia, where it was transferred by Robert Lee Gilbertson and Leif Ryvarden. In 2014, Chinese mycologists made it the type species of the new genus Datroniella after molecular analysis showed that the species then classified in Datronia belonged to three distantly related clades.

== Distribution ==
Datroniella scutellata is a widespread species with a cosmopolitan distribution, and is particularly prevalent in tropical areas. It is uncommon in Europe, where it is found only in the Alps of Austria and Switzerland.
