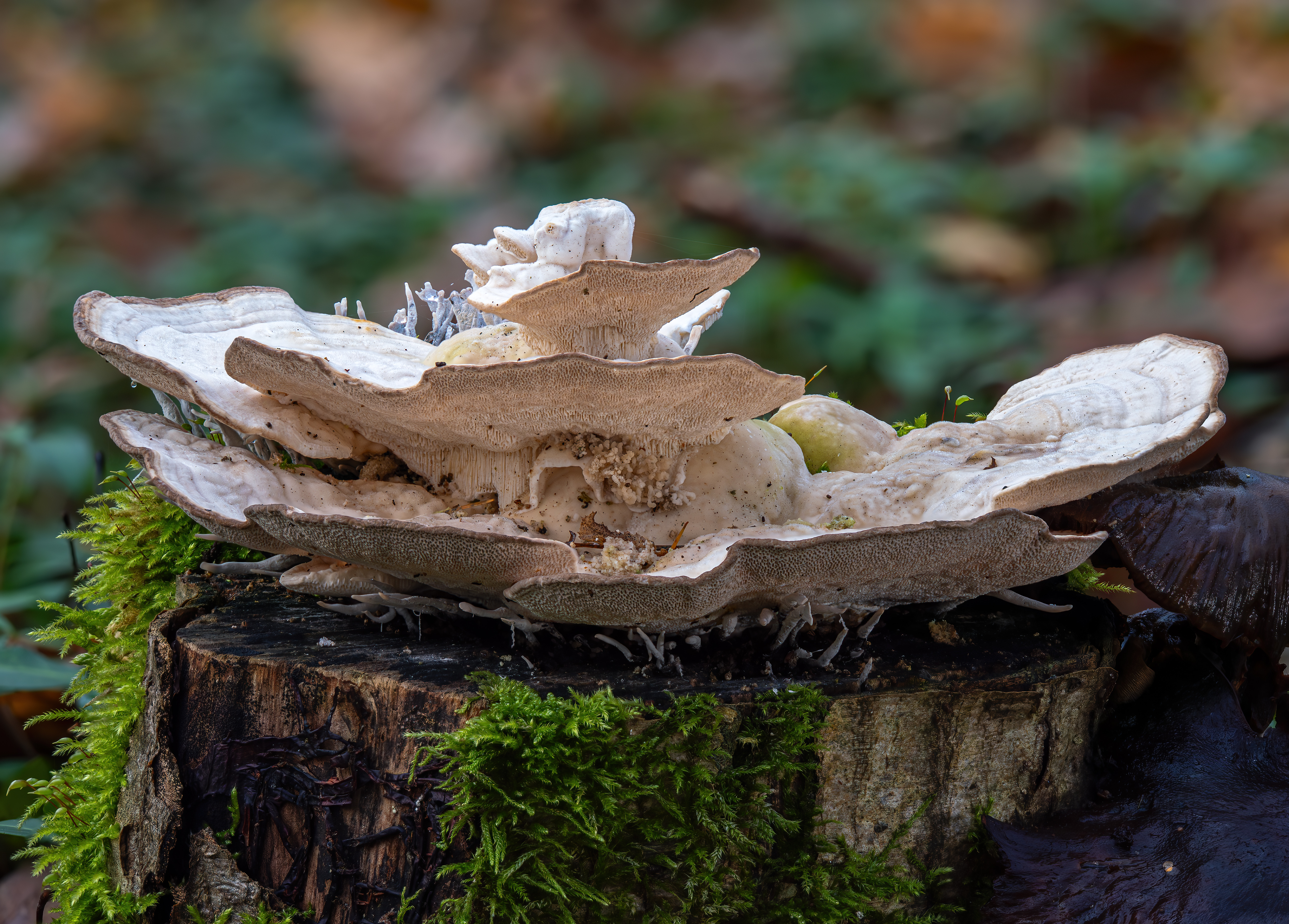

Scientific classification
- Kingdom: Fungi
- Division: Basidiomycota
- Class: Agaricomycetes
- Order: Polyporales
- Family: Dacryobolaceae
- Genus: Osteina
- Species: O. obducta

Binomial name
- Osteina obducta (Berk.) Donk

Synonyms
- Polyporus obductus Berk. (1845); Polyporus osseus Kalchbr. (1865); Leptoporus osseus (Kalchbr.) Quél. (1886); Leucoporus osseus (Kalchbr.) Quél. (1888); Tyromyces obductus (Berk.) Murrill (1907); Polyporus zelleri Murrill (1915); Grifola ossea (Kalchbr.) Pilát (1934); Grifola obducta (Berk.) Aoshima & H.Furuk. (1963); Polypilus osseus (Kalchbr.) Parmasto (1963); Scutiger osseus (Kalchbr.) Step.-Kart. (1967); Grifola obducta subsp. osseocolorata Pilát (1973); Oligoporus obductus (Berk.) Gilb. & Ryvarden (1985)

= Osteina obducta =

Species of fungus

Osteina obducta is a fungal species in the family Dacryobolaceae. The genus and species was circumscribed by mycologist Marinus Anton Donk in 1966, making Osteina obducta the type species.

== Description ==
Osteina obducta is characterized by fruit bodies that are sessile to stipitate, which are bone hard when dry. It has a monomitic hyphal system, containing only generative hyphae with clamps. The spores are hyaline and thin-walled, and are inamyloid and acyanophilic. Osteina obducta causes a brown rot in gymnosperm wood.

Osteina obducta is inedible.
