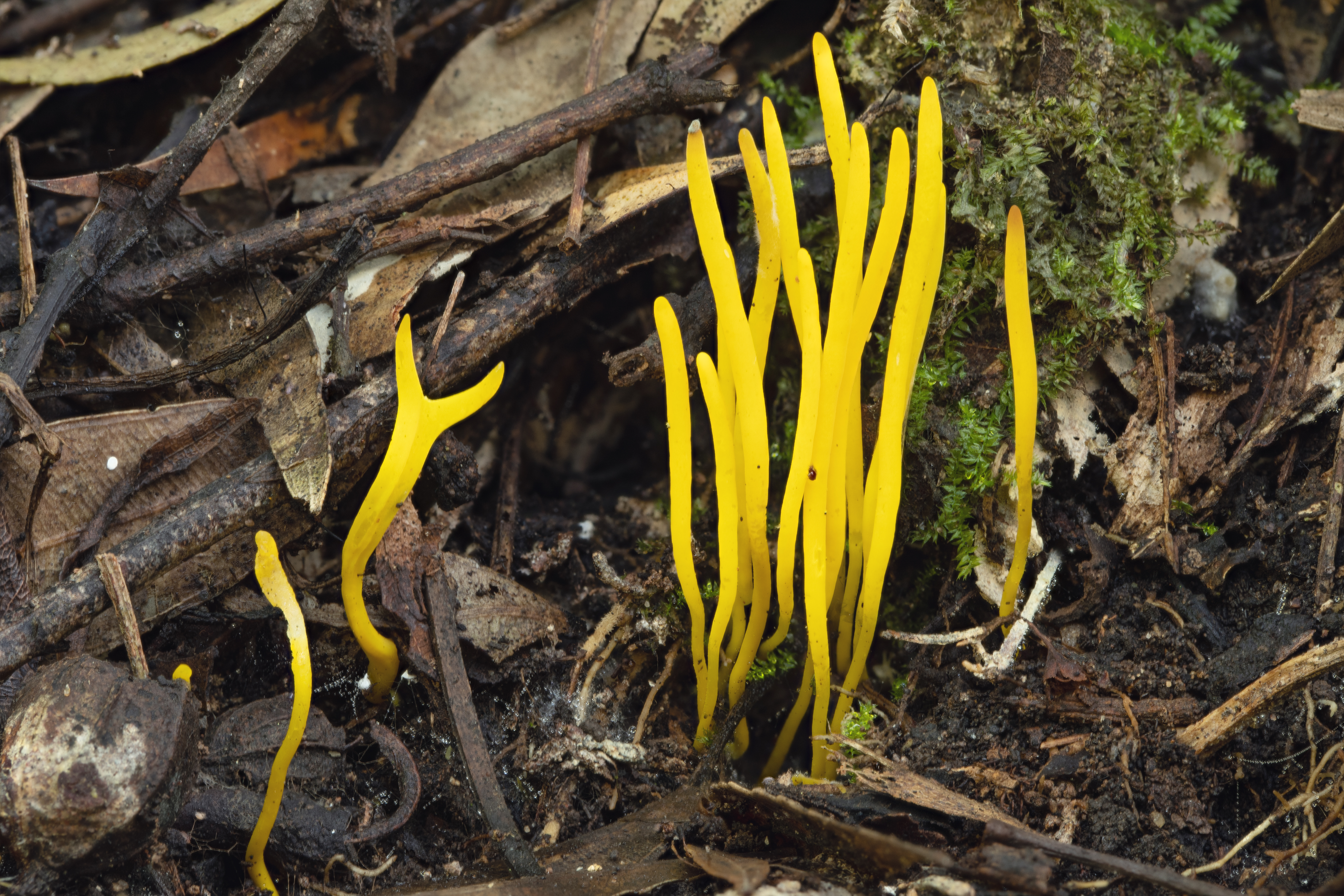

Scientific classification
- Domain: Eukaryota
- Kingdom: Fungi
- Division: Basidiomycota
- Class: Agaricomycetes
- Order: Agaricales
- Family: Clavariaceae
- Genus: Clavulinopsis
- Species: C. amoena

Binomial name
- Clavulinopsis amoena (Zollinger & Moritzi) Corner (1950)

Synonyms
- Clavaria amoena Zoll. & Moritzi (1844); Clavulinopsis aurantiocinnabarina f. amoena (Zoll. & Moritzi) R.H. Petersen (1968)

= Clavulinopsis amoena =

Species of fungus

Clavulinopsis amoena is a clavarioid fungus in the family Clavariaceae. It forms slender, cylindrical, golden-yellow fruiting bodies that grow on the ground among plant litter. It was originally described from Indonesia and appears to be distributed in temperate areas of the southern hemisphere.

== Taxonomy ==
The species was originally described from Java in 1844 by Swiss mycologists Heinrich Zollinger and Alexander Moritzi.

In his influential monograph of the clavarioid fungi, English mycologist E.J.H. Corner considered Clavulinopsis amoena to be a globose-spored species of variable colour and form that was widespread in the tropics, particularly in Asia. American mycologist Ronald H. Petersen initially agreed with Corner that C. amoena was a globose-spored species. But Petersen's subsequent study of the type specimen showed that C. amoena had ellipsoid (not globose) spores and was therefore not the same taxon described in earlier works. Petersen considered Clavaria aurantia (described from Australia) and C. luteotenerrima (described from Indonesia) to be synonyms.

Despite this, the name C. amoena has continued to be used for a globose-spored species in some more recent taxonomic accounts.

== Description ==
The fruit body of Clavulinopsis amoena is cylindrical, up to 50 by 2 mm, bright apricot yellow to cadmium yellow, borne on a similarly coloured, cylindrical stipe up to 15 by 1.5 mm. Microscopically, the basidiospores are smooth, hyaline, and ellipsoid, 6 to 7 by 4 to 4.5 μm.

== Distribution and habitat ==
Confusion over the identification of Clavulinopsis amoena means that its distribution is unclear. The species was initially described from Indonesia, but has also been reported from Australia and New Zealand. Petersen considered that "the taxon seems to be distributed over the Southern Hemisphere, at least in temperate areas." Records of C. amoena from Brazil refer to a different, globose-spored species, as do at least some records from elsewhere in America.

The species typically occurs in small clusters on the ground in broadleaf woodland.
