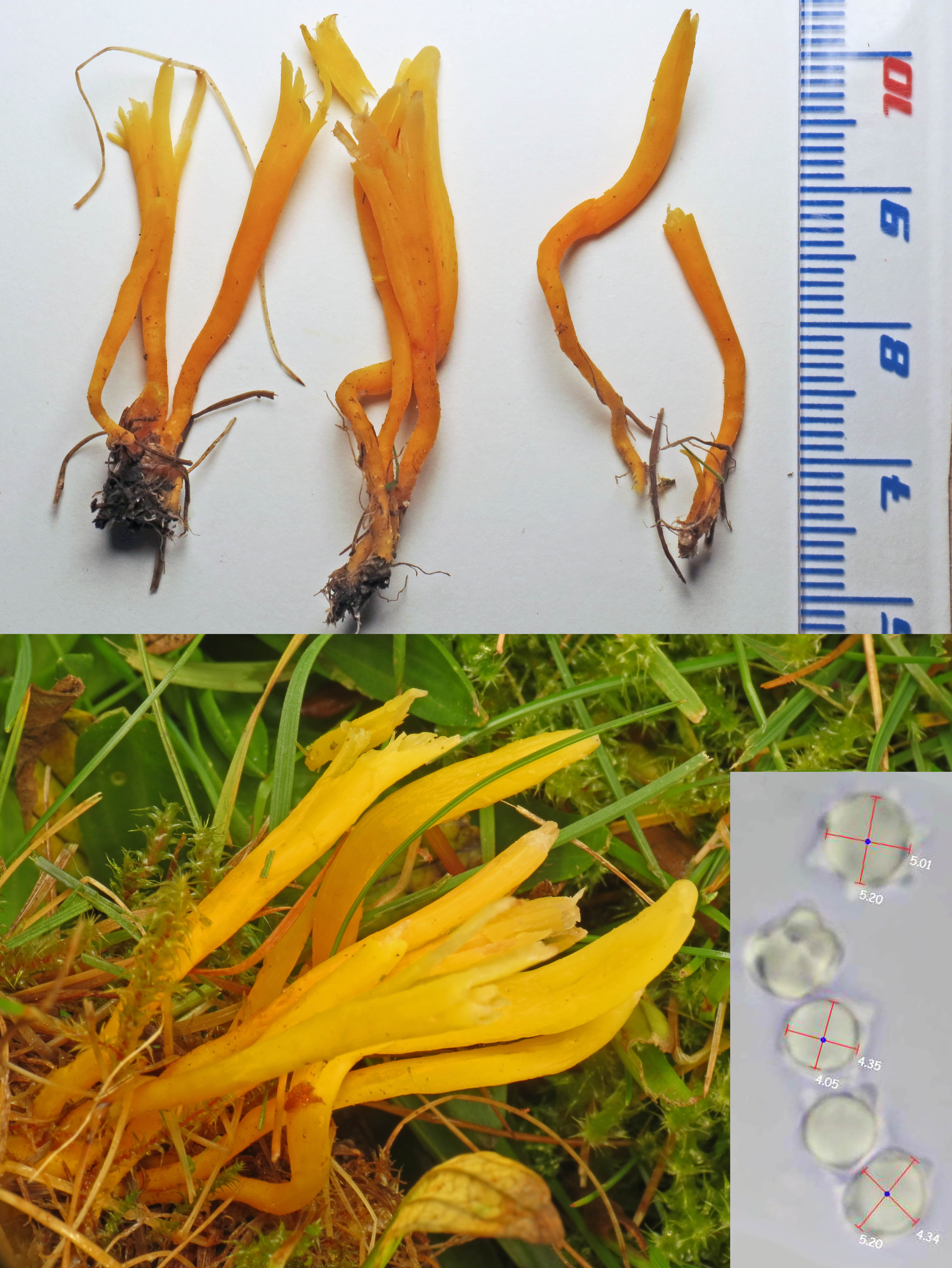
- Clavulinopsis helvola fruit bodies and spiny spores

Scientific classification
- Domain: Eukaryota
- Kingdom: Fungi
- Division: Basidiomycota
- Class: Agaricomycetes
- Order: Agaricales
- Family: Clavariaceae
- Genus: Clavulinopsis
- Species: C. helvola

Binomial name
- Clavulinopsis helvola (Pers.) Corner (1950)

Synonyms
- Clavaria helvola Pers. (1797); Clavaria inaequalis var. helvola (Pers.) Fr. (1828); Ramariopsis helvola (Pers.) R.H. Petersen (1978); Donkella helvola (Pers.) Malysheva & Zmitr. (2006)

= Clavulinopsis helvola =

Species of fungus

Clavulinopsis helvola is a clavarioid fungus in the family Clavariaceae. In the UK, it has the recommended English name of yellow club. It forms slender, cylindrical, yellow fruiting bodies that grow on the ground in agriculturally unimproved grassland or in woodland litter. It was originally described from Europe.

== Taxonomy ==
The species was originally described from Europe in 1797 by South African born mycologist Christiaan Hendrik Persoon. In 1950, it was placed in the genus Clavulinopsis by English mycologist E.J.H. Corner. In 1978, American mycologist Ron Petersen revised the clavarioid genera and placed the species in Ramariopsis, a move followed by some subsequent researchers.

== Description ==
The fruit body of Clavulinopsis helvola is cylindrical to narrowly clavate, up to 60 by 3 mm, lemon yellow to deep yellow, with an indistinct stem. Microscopically, the basidiospores are hyaline, subglobose to ellipsoid, 5 to 6.5 by 4.5 to 6 μm, with large but sparse spines up to 1.5 μm long.

== Similar species ==
In Europe, Clavulinopsis laeticolor is a very similar species in the same habitat and best distinguished microscopically by its smooth, ellipsoid spores. Clavulinopsis luteoalba is also similar, though typically a more orange-yellow. Clavulinopsis fusiformis is similarly coloured, but fruit bodies are normally larger and appear in dense, fasciculate (closely bunched) clusters.

== Distribution and habitat ==
The species was initially described from Europe, with a recent epitype from Slovakia. It is widely distributed throughout Europe, but has also been reported from India and Japan, China, the United States, and Brazil.

The species occurs singly or in small clusters on the ground and is presumed to be saprotrophic. In America and Asia it grows in woodland, but in Europe it generally occurs in agriculturally unimproved, short-sward grassland (pastures and lawns). Such waxcap grasslands are a declining and threatened habitat, but Clavulinopsis helvola is one of the commoner species and is not currently considered of conservation concern.
