= D. tropica =

D. tropica can refer to the following species. The specific epithet tropica refers to the tropics.

- Dactylopusia tropica, a copepod in the family Thalestridae
- Dasyhelea tropica, a biting midge in the family Ceratopogonidae
- Datroniella tropica, a crust fungus in the family Polyporaceae
- Dentimargo tropica, a sea snail in the family Marginellidae
- Desmarestia tropica, a seaweed in the family Desmarestiaceae
- Diabrotica tropica, a leaf beetle in the family Chrysomelidae
- Diphasia tropica, a hydrozoan in the family Sertulariidae
- Dipoena tropica, a spider in the family Theridiidae
- Dolichopeza tropica, a crane fly in the family Tipulidae
- Dometorina tropica, a mite in the family Hemileiidae
- Drepanosticta tropica, a damselfly in the family Platystictidae
- Dryopteris tropica, a plant in the family Dryopteridaceae
- Dynamena tropica, a hydrozoan in the family Sertulariidae
- Dynamenella tropica, an isopod in the family Sphaeromatidae
