= Overeem =

Overeem is a surname. Notable people with the surname include:

- Alistair Overeem (born 1980), Dutch mixed martial artist and kickboxer, brother of Valentijn
- Casper van Overeem (1893–1927), Dutch mycologist
- Joris van Overeem (born 1994), Dutch footballer
- Valentijn Overeem (born 1976), Dutch mixed martial artist and kickboxer
