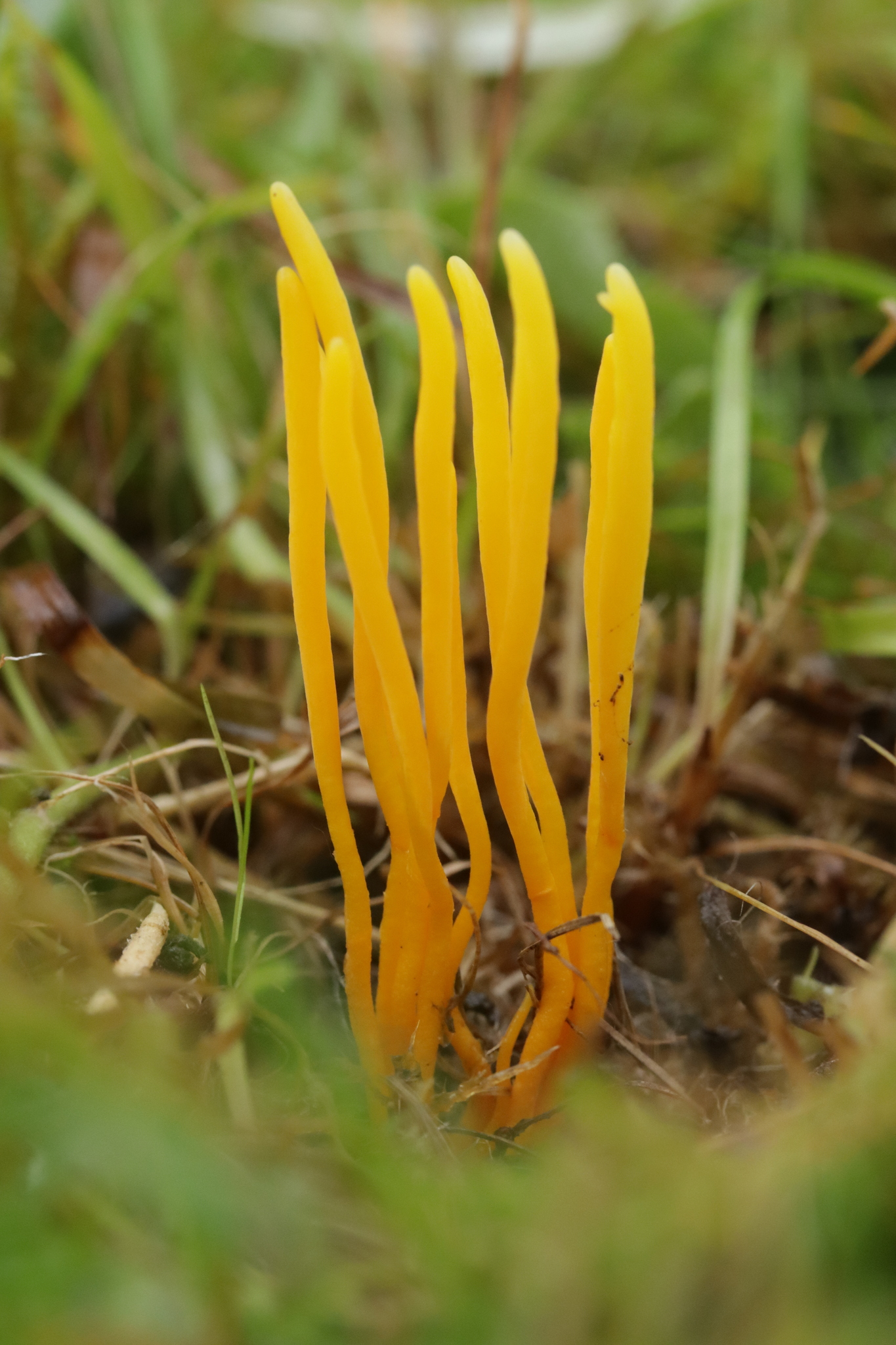

Scientific classification
- Kingdom: Fungi
- Division: Basidiomycota
- Class: Agaricomycetes
- Order: Agaricales
- Family: Clavariaceae
- Genus: Clavulinopsis
- Species: C. laeticolor

Binomial name
- Clavulinopsis laeticolor (Berk. & M.A.Curtis) R.H.Petersen (1965)

Synonyms
- Clavaria laeticolor Berk. & M.A.Curtis (1868); Ramariopsis laeticolor (Berk. & M.A.Curtis) R.H.Petersen (1978); Donkella laeticolor (Berk. & M.A. Curtis) Malysheva & Zmitr. (2006); Clavaria pulchra Peck (1876) Clavulinopsis pulchra (Peck) Corner (1950)

= Clavulinopsis laeticolor =

Species of fungus

Clavulinopsis laeticolor
- Mycological characteristics
- Smooth hymenium
- No distinct cap
- Hymenium attachment is irregular or not applicable
- Stipe is bare
- Spore print is white
- Ecology is saprotrophic
- Edibility is unknown or inedible

Clavulinopsis laeticolor, commonly known as the golden fairy club or handsome club, is a clavarioid fungus in the family Clavariaceae. It forms slender, cylindrical, yellow fruit bodies that grow on the ground in woodland litter or in agriculturally unimproved grassland.

== Taxonomy ==
The species was originally described from Cuba in 1868 by British mycologist Miles Joseph Berkeley and his American collaborator and fellow clergyman Moses Ashley Curtis. In 1965, it was placed in the genus Clavulinopsis by American mycologist Ron Petersen. English mycologist E. J. H. Corner treated the species under the name Clavulinopsis pulchra, a taxon originally described from the United States and part of the C. laeticolor complex.

The species complex is as yet unresolved.

== Description ==
The fruit body is cylindrical to narrowly clavate, up to 100 mm (4 in) by 10 mm, lemon yellow to deep yellow, with an indistinct stem, white at the base. Microscopically, the basidiospores are hyaline, ellipsoid, 4.5 to 7 by 3.5 to 5 μm, with a large, eccentric apiculus.

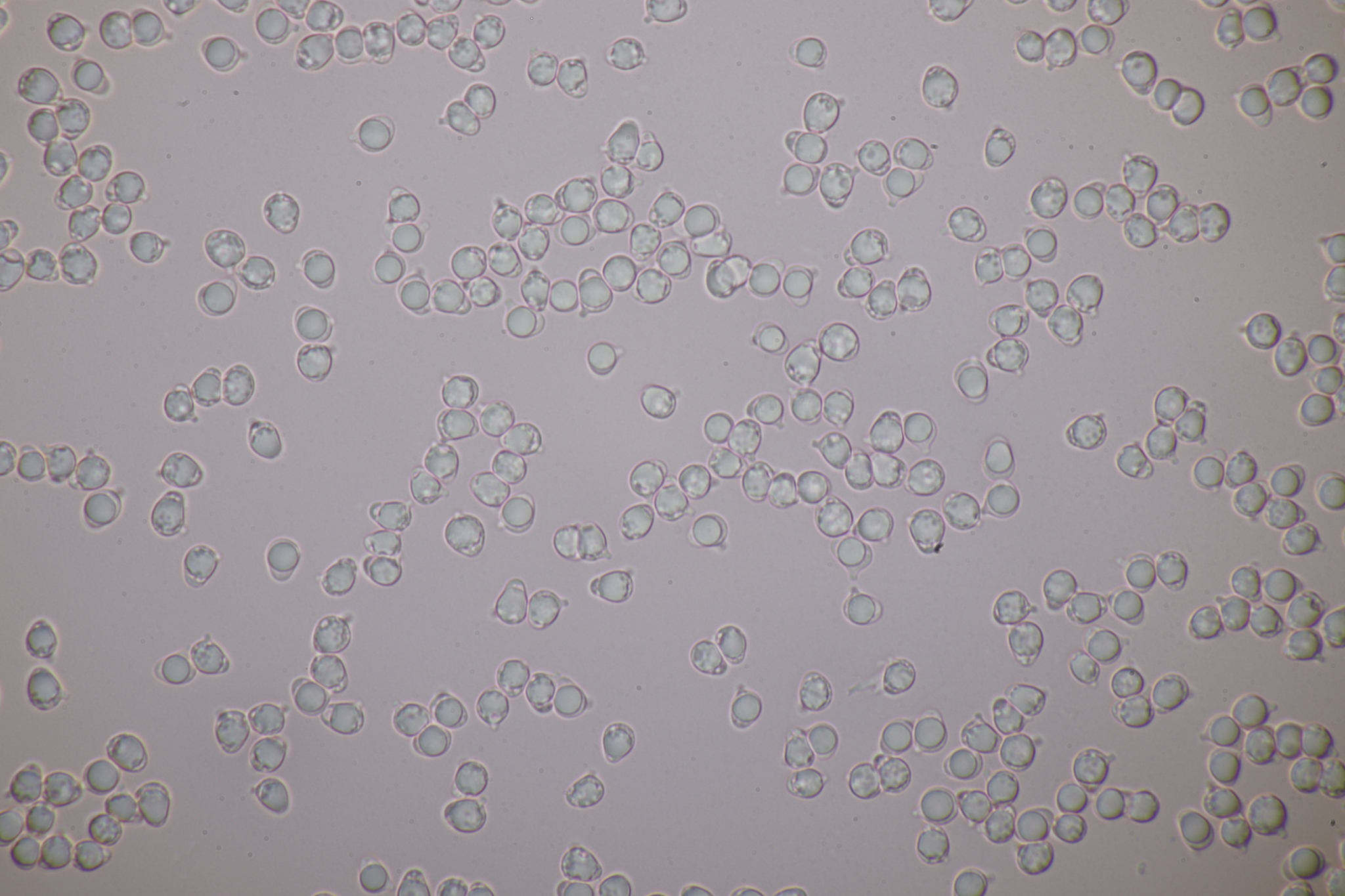
Basidiospores

=== Similar species ===
In Europe, Clavulinopsis helvola is a very similar species in the same habitat and best distinguished microscopically by its spiny spores. Clavulinopsis luteoalba is also similar, though typically a more orange-yellow. Clavulinopsis fusiformis is similarly coloured, but fruit bodies are normally larger and appear in dense, fasciculate (closely bunched) clusters.

== Distribution and habitat ==
Clavulinopsis laeticolor was initially described from Cuba. In its wide sense, as part of a complex of similar species, it has been reported from North America, Europe (as C. pulchra), Malaya (as C. pulchra), China, Australia (as C. pulchra), New Zealand, Brazil, Central and South America (as C. pulchra).

The species occurs singly or in small clusters on the ground and is presumed to be saprotrophic. In America and Asia it grows in woodland, but in Europe it generally occurs in agriculturally unimproved, short-sward grassland (pastures and lawns). Such waxcap grasslands are a declining and threatened habitat, but C. laeticolor is one of the commoner species and is not generally considered of conservation concern.
