= Datroniella minuta =

Scientific classification
- Domain: Eukaryota
- Kingdom: Fungi
- Division: Basidiomycota
- Class: Agaricomycetes
- Order: Polyporales
- Family: Polyporaceae
- Genus: Datroniella
- Species: D. minuta

Binomial name
- Datroniella minuta Lira & Ryvarden (2016)

Species of fungus

Datroniella minuta is a species of fungus in the family Polyporaceae. It was described in 2016 by mycologists Carla Rejane Sousa de Lira and Leif Ryvarden from collections made in northeast Brazil. The fungus is characterized by its tiny, cup-shaped fruit bodies that are reddish to dark brown, and microscopically by its large cylindrical spores that typically measure 9–10 by 3 μm.
