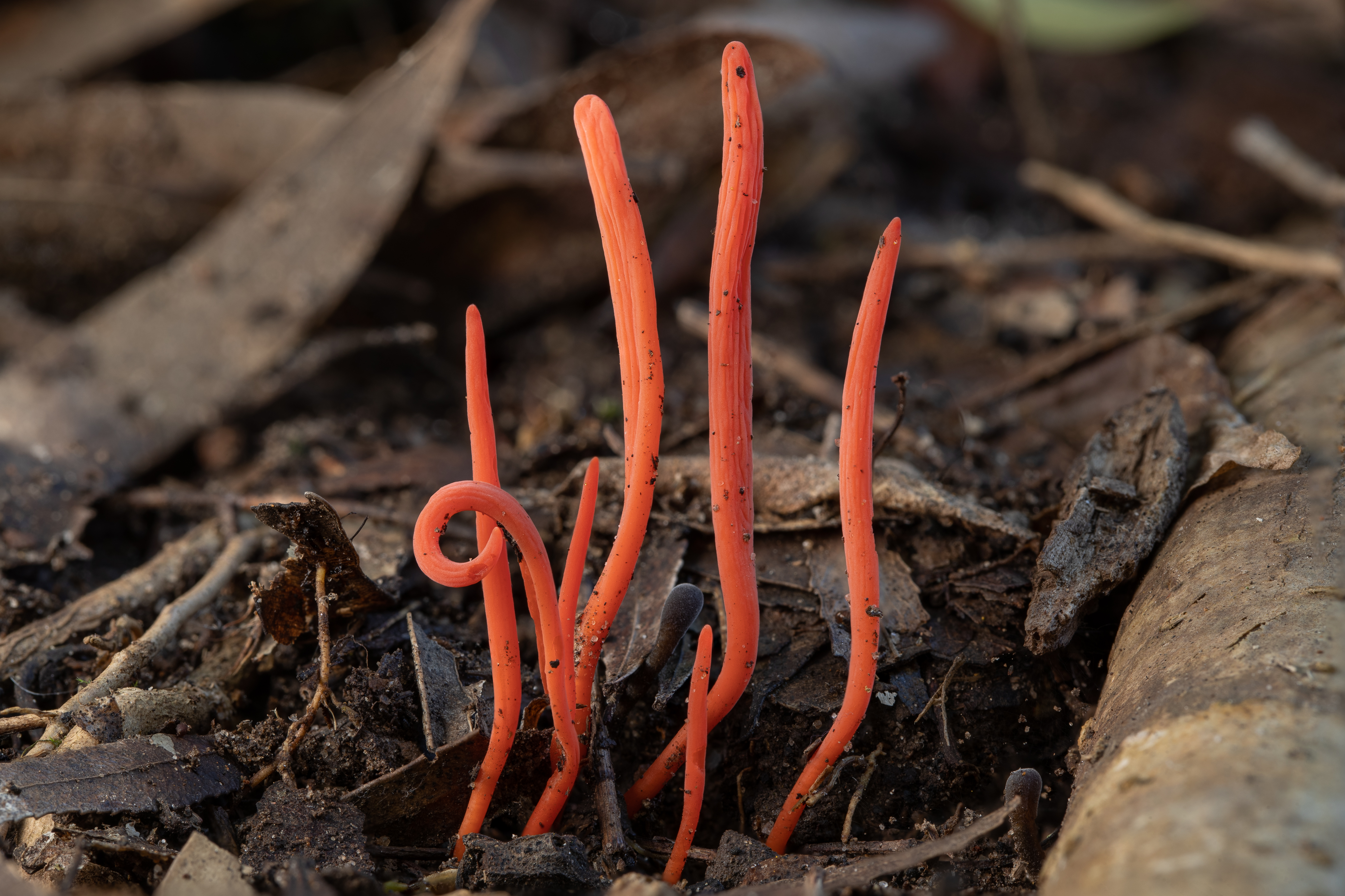

Scientific classification
- Domain: Eukaryota
- Kingdom: Fungi
- Division: Basidiomycota
- Class: Agaricomycetes
- Order: Agaricales
- Family: Clavariaceae
- Genus: Clavulinopsis
- Species: C. sulcata

Binomial name
- Clavulinopsis sulcata Overeem (1923)

Synonyms
- Clavaria sulcata (Overeem) R.H.Petersen (1978); Clavaria miniata Berk. (1843); Clavulinopsis miniata Corner (1950); Clavaria phoenicea var. ealaensis Beeli (1926); Clavulinopsis miniata var. ealaensis (Beeli) Corner (1966); Clavulinopsis miniata var. rosacea Corner (1950); Clavulinopsis miniata var. sanguinea Corner (1950)

= Clavulinopsis sulcata =

Species of fungus

Clavulinopsis sulcata is a clavarioid fungus in the family Clavariaceae and is the type species of the genus Clavulinopsis. It forms very long, slender, cylindrical pinkish or orange fruiting bodies that grow on the ground among plant litter. A vernacular name that has been used for the species is flame fungus.

== Taxonomy ==
The species was originally described from Java in 1923 by the Dutch mycologist Casper van Overeem, when he made it the type species of the newly circumscribed genus Clavulinopsis.

In his influential monograph of the clavarioid fungi, the English mycologist E.J.H. Corner considered Clavulinopsis sulcata to be a synonym of Clavaria miniata, originally described by the English cryptogamist Miles Joseph Berkeley in 1843, from collections made in Uitenhage, South Africa. Berkeley's name is, however, illegitimate since it is a homonym of the earlier and unrelated Clavaria miniata Purton (1821). Corner also considered Clavaria phoenicea, described from Java in 1847 by the Swiss mycologist Heinrich Zollinger, to be a further synonym.

The American mycologist Ronald H. Petersen initially agreed with Corner that Clavaria miniata was the same species. But a study of the type specimen by British mycologist Derek Reid showed that C. miniata had ellipsoid (not globose) spores and was therefore possibly not synonymous, as later acknowledged by Petersen. Petersen also noted that C. sulcata was part of a complex of related globose-spored species representing collections with apricot-coloured fruit bodies, with C. phoenicea having red-orange fruit bodies, and Clavaria miyabeana blood-red fruit bodies.

== Description ==
The fruit body of Clavulinopsis sulcata is cylindrical or somewhat club-shaped, up to 70 by 7 mm (2.8 by 0.3 in) borne on a cylindrical stipe up to 20 mm (0.8 in) long. Several fruit bodies may grow close together, or they may grow singly, or in groups of two or three. At first they are tapering, but become irregularly fleshy or inflated later, and ridged or wrinkled and somewhat waxy as they age. The flesh is pink or orange-pink; the stipe is a similar colour but is pale pinkish-salmon at the base. The flesh is odourless and tastes mildly of carrots, with a slightly bitter aftertaste. The spores are borne on the sides of the clubs and have thin walls; they measure 5.8–7.2 by 5.8–6.8 μm, and are globose and opalescent.

== Distribution and habitat ==
Clavulinopsis sulcata was initially described from Indonesia and has also been reported from eastern Australia and New Zealand, where its range includes the states of Queensland, New South Wales, Victoria and Tasmania, as well as both islands of New Zealand. It is a fairly common fungus, and its conservation status has been assessed as being of least concern. It grows on the ground among leaf litter. In Tasmania it is found in mixed Nothofagus and Leptospermum woodland.
