= Marinus Anton Donk =

Dutch mycologist (1908–1972)

- Born: 14 August 1908; Situbondo, East Java, Dutch East Indies
- Died: 2 September 1972 (aged 64)
- Known for: Contributions to fungal taxonomy
- Scientific career
- Fields: Mycology
- Author abbrev. (botany): Donk

Marinus Anton Donk (14 August 1908 – 2 September 1972) was a Dutch mycologist. He specialized in the taxonomy and nomenclature of mushrooms. Rolf Singer wrote in his obituary that he was "one of the most outstanding figures of contemporary mycology."

== Early life ==
Donk was born in Situbondo, East Java in 1908, and completed secondary school in The Hague, Netherlands. He studied biology at the University of Utrecht, starting in 1927. As a graduate student in mycology he completed the work for his 1931 "Revisie van de Nederlandse Heterobasidiomyceteae" (Revision of the Dutch Heterobasidiomycetes). He completed his studies and attained a doctorate degree in 1933 with the second part of his work, Revisie van de Nederlandse Heterobasidiomyceteae II. Afterwards he returned to Java, where he worked from 1934 to 1940 as a teacher, and, starting from 1941 as a curator in the herbarium of the Buitenzorg Botanical Garden. He was interned in a Japanese prison camp from 1942 to 1945. During his time there, he managed to culture yeast that grew in palm inflorescences in the camps; he used the yeast to ferment rice, which provided essential vitamins for the prisoners.

== Career ==
Donk's main research area was on the taxonomy of the mushrooms, especially the Aphyllophorales and Heterobasidiomycetes. He was involved in the development of a modern system to classify the Aphyllophorales and influenced nomenclatural rules for mushrooms.

Donk became Head of the Herbarium Bogoriense from 1947 to 1955, and a Deputy Professor at the University of Indonesia in 1952. It was around this time when he became interested in nomenclature. After returning to Holland, he was the head of the Mycological Department at Rijksherbarium in Leiden from 1956 to 1972, and a member of the Royal Netherlands Academy of Arts and Sciences from 1954 to 1960. Donk was also the president of the Nomenclature Committee of the International Botanical Congresses, in the Committee for Fungi and Lichens. Together with his colleague Rudolph Arnold Maas Geesteranus, Donk founded the journal Persoonia in 1959.

He was honoured in 1973, when F. Kotlába and Z. Pouzar established Donkioporia, a genus of fungi in the family Fomitopsidaceae.

== Selected publications ==
- (1931) Revisie van de Nederlandse Heterobasidiomyceteae (uitgez. Uredinales en Ustilaginales) en Homobasidiomyceteae-Aphyllophraceae : I. (Revision of the Dutch Heterobasidiomycetes (except for the Uredinales and Ustilaginales) and Homobasidiomycetes: Aphyllophraceae) in Mededeelingen van de Nederlandsche Mycologische Vereeniging (Proceedings of the Dutch Mycological Association) 18:20 S. 67–200.
- (1933) Revisie van de Nederlandse Heterobasidiomyceteae (uitgez. Uredinales en Ustilaginales) en Homobasidiomyceteae-Aphyllophraceae : II. in Mededeelingen van het Botanisch Museum en Herbarium van de Rijks Universiteit te Utrecht 9 S. 1–278.
- (1949) New and revised nomina generica conservanda proposed for Basidiomycetes (Fungi) in Annales du Jardin Botanique de Buitenzorg (Annals of the Buitenzorg Botanical Garden) 3rd series, 18 S. 83–168.
- (1949) Nomenclatural notes on generic names of agarics (Fungi: Agaricales) in Annales du Jardin Botanique de Buitenzorg (Annals of the Buitenzorg Botanical Garden) 3rd series, Bd. 18 S. 271–402
- (1959) Notes on Cyphellaceae: 1 in Persoonia 1 S. 25–110.
- (1962) The generic names proposed for the Agaricaceae in Beihefte Nova Hedwigia (supplement to Nova Hedwigia) 5 S. 1–320.
- (1962) Notes on Cyphellaceae: 2 in Persoonia 2 S. 331–348.
- (1964) A conspectus of the families of Aphyllophorales in Persoonia 3 S. 199–324.
- (1964) The generic names proposed for Polyporaceae in Persoonia 1 S. 173–302.

== Taxa described ==
- Clavariadelphus Donk
- Datronia Donk
- Osteina Donk
- Ramariopsis (Donk) Corner (as Clavaria subg. Ramariopsis)
- Thanatephorus Donk

== Eponymous taxa ==
- Donkella Doty 1950 (now Clavulinopsis)
- Donkia Pilat 1937 (now Climacodon)
- Donkioporia Kotl. & Pouzar 1973
