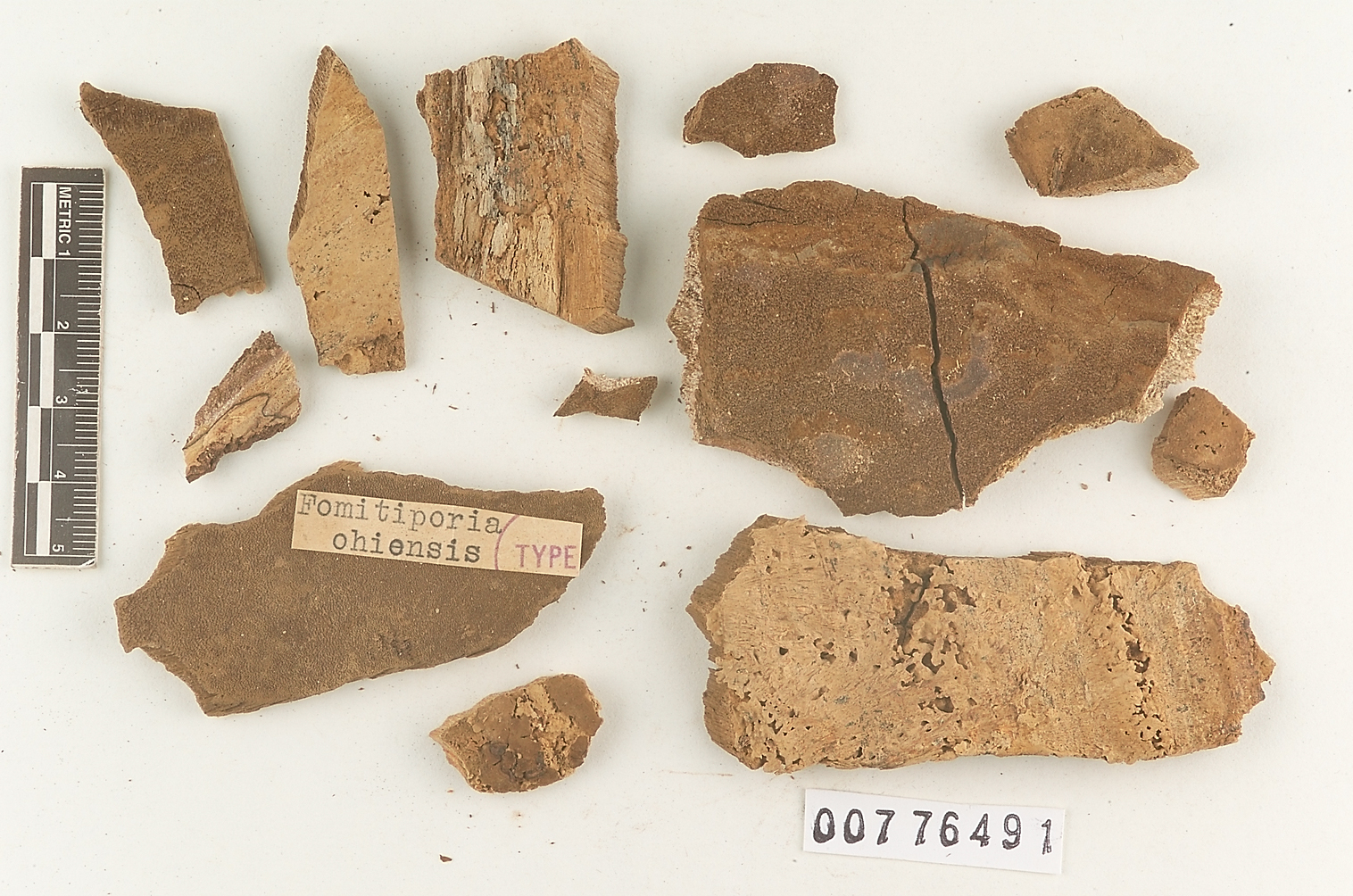
- Donkioporia expansa herbarium specimen, formerly Fomitiporia ohiensis

Scientific classification
- Kingdom: Fungi
- Division: Basidiomycota
- Class: Agaricomycetes
- Order: Polyporales
- Family: Fomitopsidaceae
- Genus: Donkioporia; Kotl. & Pouzar (1973)

Type species
- Donkioporia expansa (Desm.) Kotlába & Pouzar (1973)

Species
- D. albidofusca; D. expansa

= Donkioporia =

Genus of fungi

Donkioporia is a genus of fungi in the family Fomitopsidaceae. The genus consists of two resupinate (crust-like) species: the type Donkioporia expansa, and D. albidofusca (formerly Poria albidofusca), which was transferred to the genus in 2010.

The genus name of Donkioporia is in honour of Marinus Anton Donk (1908–1972), who was a Dutch mycologist. He specialized in the taxonomy and nomenclature of mushrooms.

The genus was circumscribed by František Kotlaba and Zdeněk Pouzar in Persoonia Vol.7 on page 214 in 1973.
