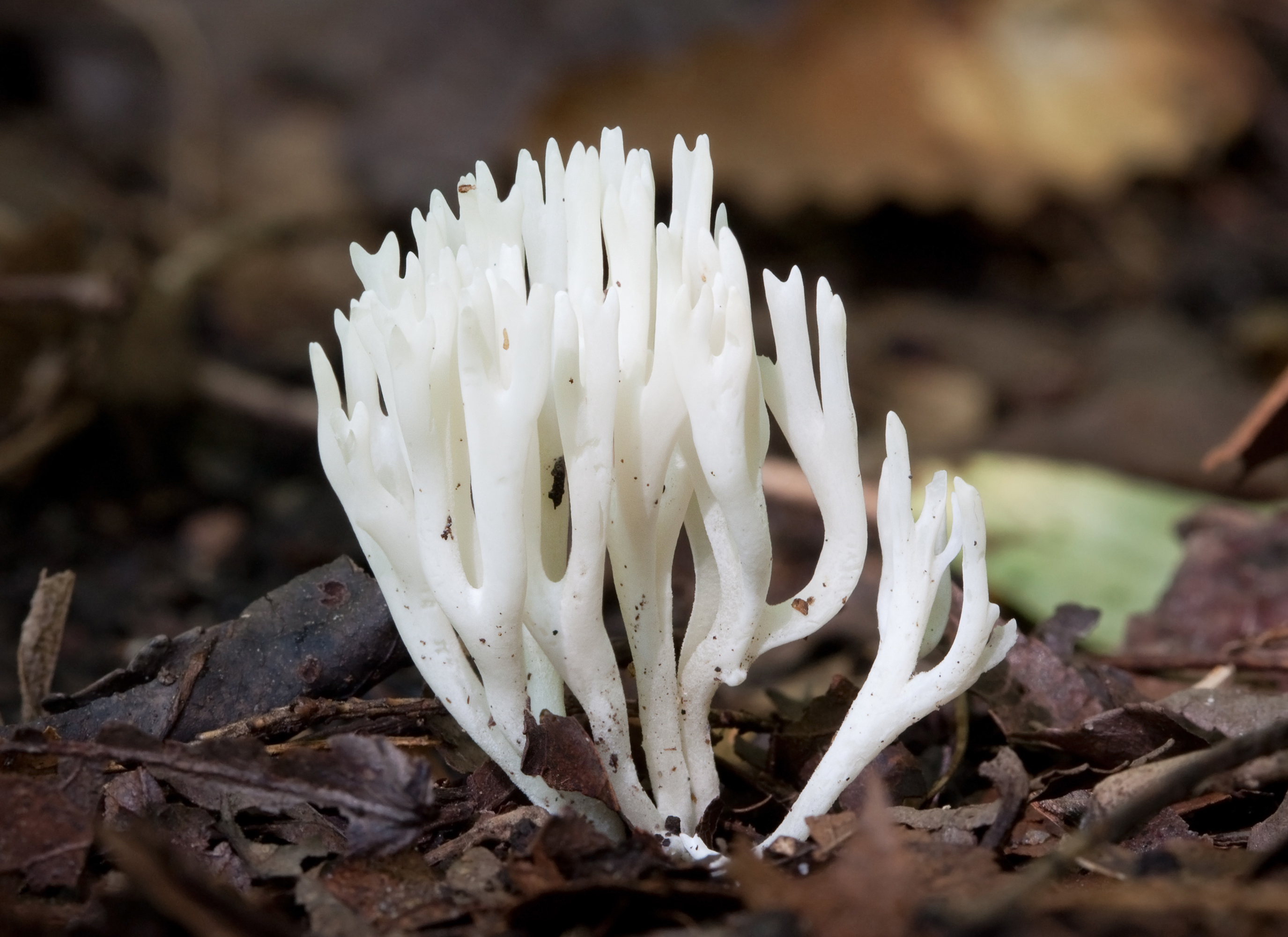
- Ramariopsis kunzei

Scientific classification
- Domain: Eukaryota
- Kingdom: Fungi
- Division: Basidiomycota
- Class: Agaricomycetes
- Order: Agaricales
- Family: Clavariaceae
- Genus: Ramariopsis (Donk) Corner (1950)

Type species
- Ramariopsis kunzei (Fr.) Corner (1950)

Species
- 41 species

Synonyms
- Clavaria subgen. Ramariopsis Donk (1933)

= Ramariopsis =

Genus of fungi

Ramariopsis is a genus of coral fungi in the family Clavariaceae. The genus has a collectively widespread distribution and contains about 40 species. The name means 'having the appearance of Ramaria'.

== Taxonomy ==
Ramariopsis was originally defined as a subgenus of Clavaria by Dutch mycologist Marinus Anton Donk in 1933. Several European species similar to the type, Clavaria kunzei, were included: Clavaria subtilis, Clavaria pyxidata, Clavaria angulispora, and Clavaria pulchella. In Donk's concept, defining characteristics of the group included small, branching, fruitbodies with a stipe, and an almost cartilaginous consistency to the flesh. Spores are small and hyaline (translucent), spherical to ellipsoid, and have a surface ornamentation ranging from echinulate (spiny) to verruculose (covered with small warts). E.J.H. Corner promoted the subgenus to generic status in his 1950 world monograph of clavarioid fungi.

Ron Petersen emended the genus in 1966 to include smooth-spored species, such as R. minutula. Three years later, he proposed the subgenus Laevispora to contain the smooth-spored species. In 1985, Pegler and Young used electron microscopy to examine the ultrastructural details of the spore surface, which revealed that the spores considered smooth with conventional light microscopy were ornamented at the ultrastructural level. They determined that the genus could be divided into three groups based on spore ornamentation. The Kunzei group have a discontinuous tunica (sheath) that form verrucae (warts); the Biformis group have a continuous tunica that form verrucae; and the Minutula group have a continuous tunica that form rugosities (wrinkles or creases).

== Description ==
Species have upright fruit bodies that are stalked, with several branches, often dichotomously, sometimes antler-like. The branches can be cylindrical or flattened, with a pointed or rounded apex, and the texture of the flesh can be brittle or fairly tough, and in various colours. Hyphae are more or less swollen, with clamps. The basidia are mostly four-spored. Spores are broadly ellipsoid or roughly spherical, with a maximum length of 5.5 μm. They are hyaline, finely echinulate or warted, and each contains a large oil-drop or guttule.

== Distribution ==
Ramariopsis species are widely distributed in semi-evergreen to wet evergreen shola forests of the Western Ghats, Kerala, India and occur scattered in dense clumps on soil and rarely on rotten wood. Two species, viz. Ramariopsis kunzei and R. pulchella have been reported from the Western Ghats.

== Species ==
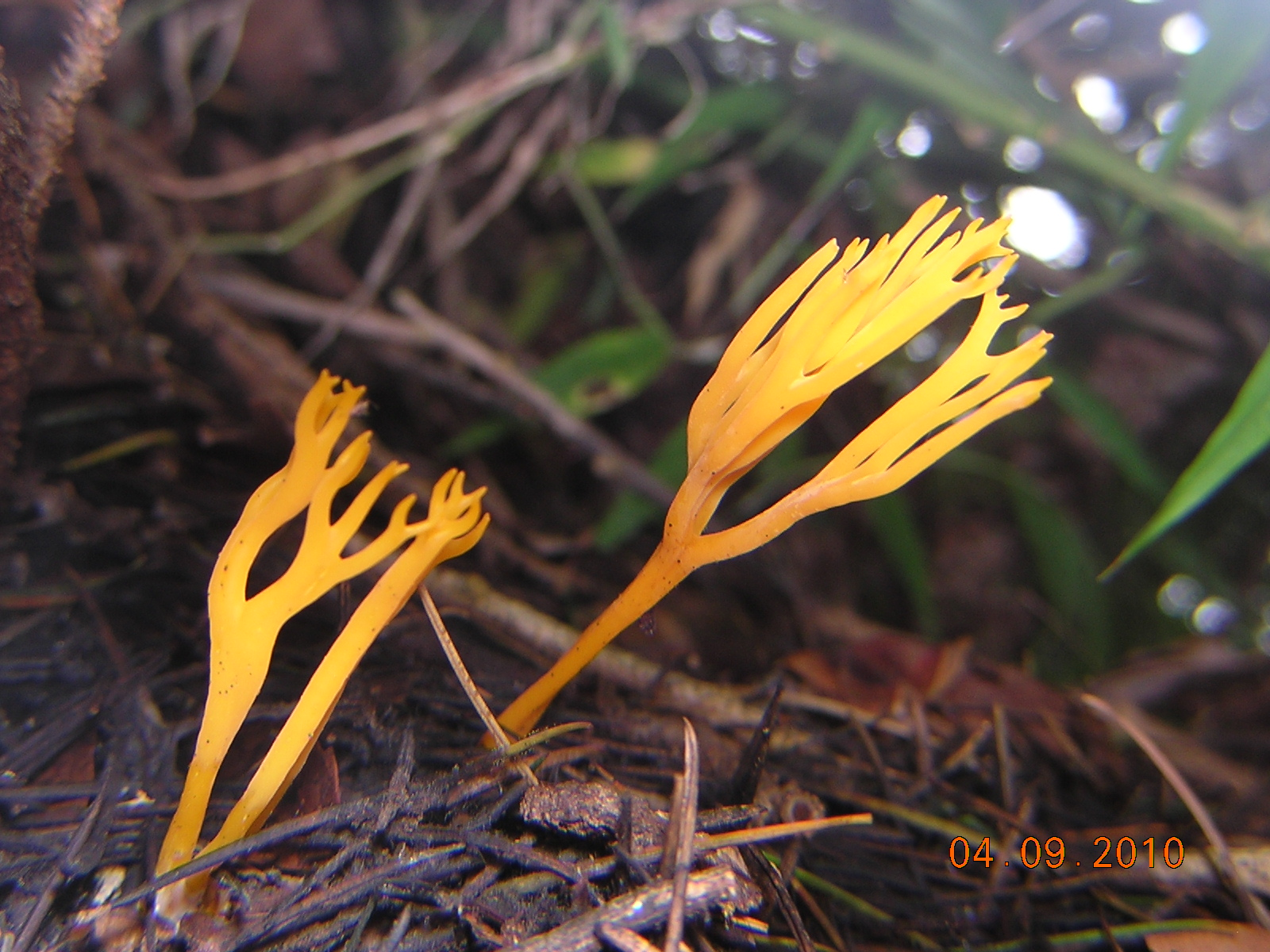
Ramariopsis crocea

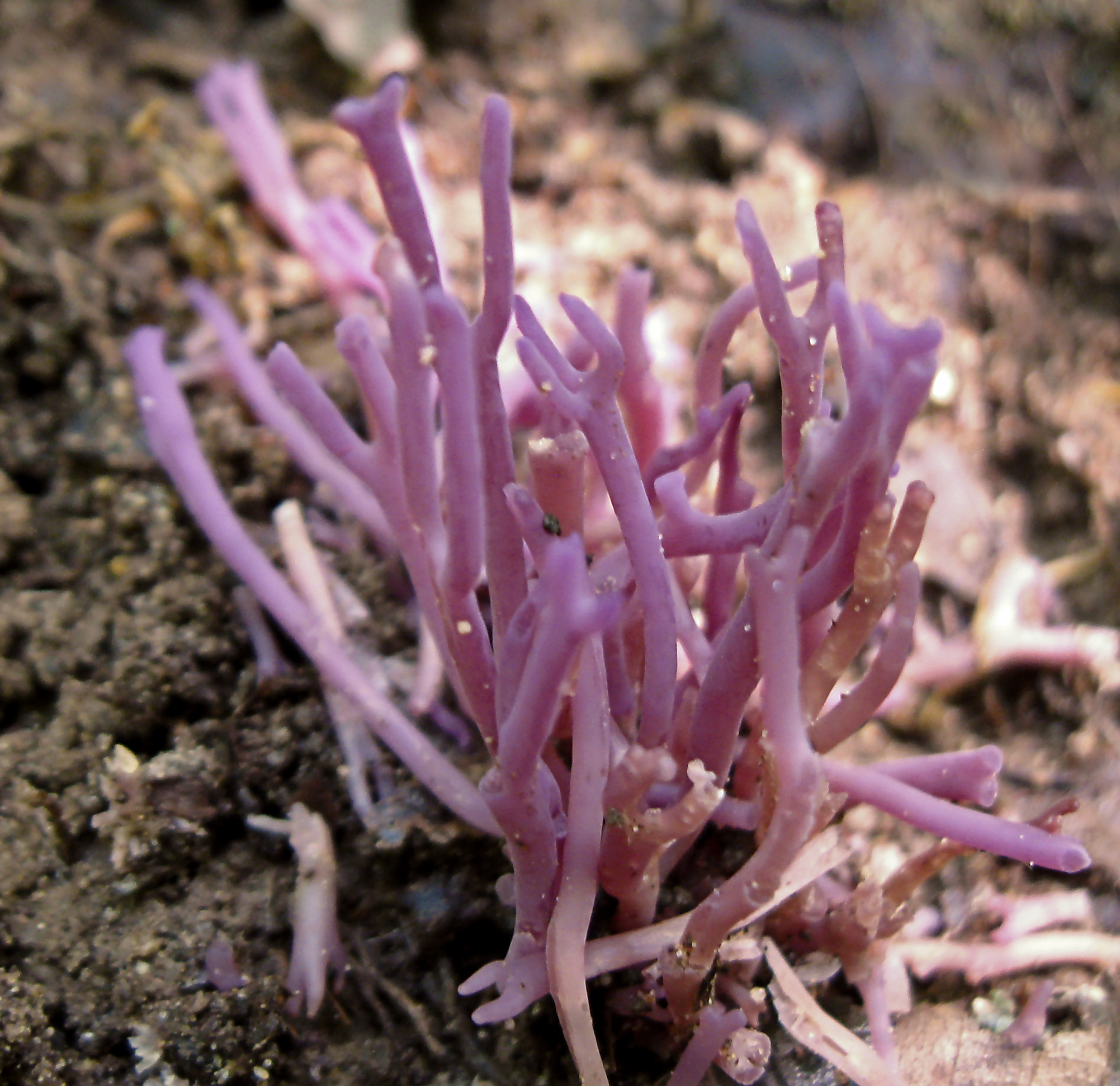
Ramariopsis pulchella

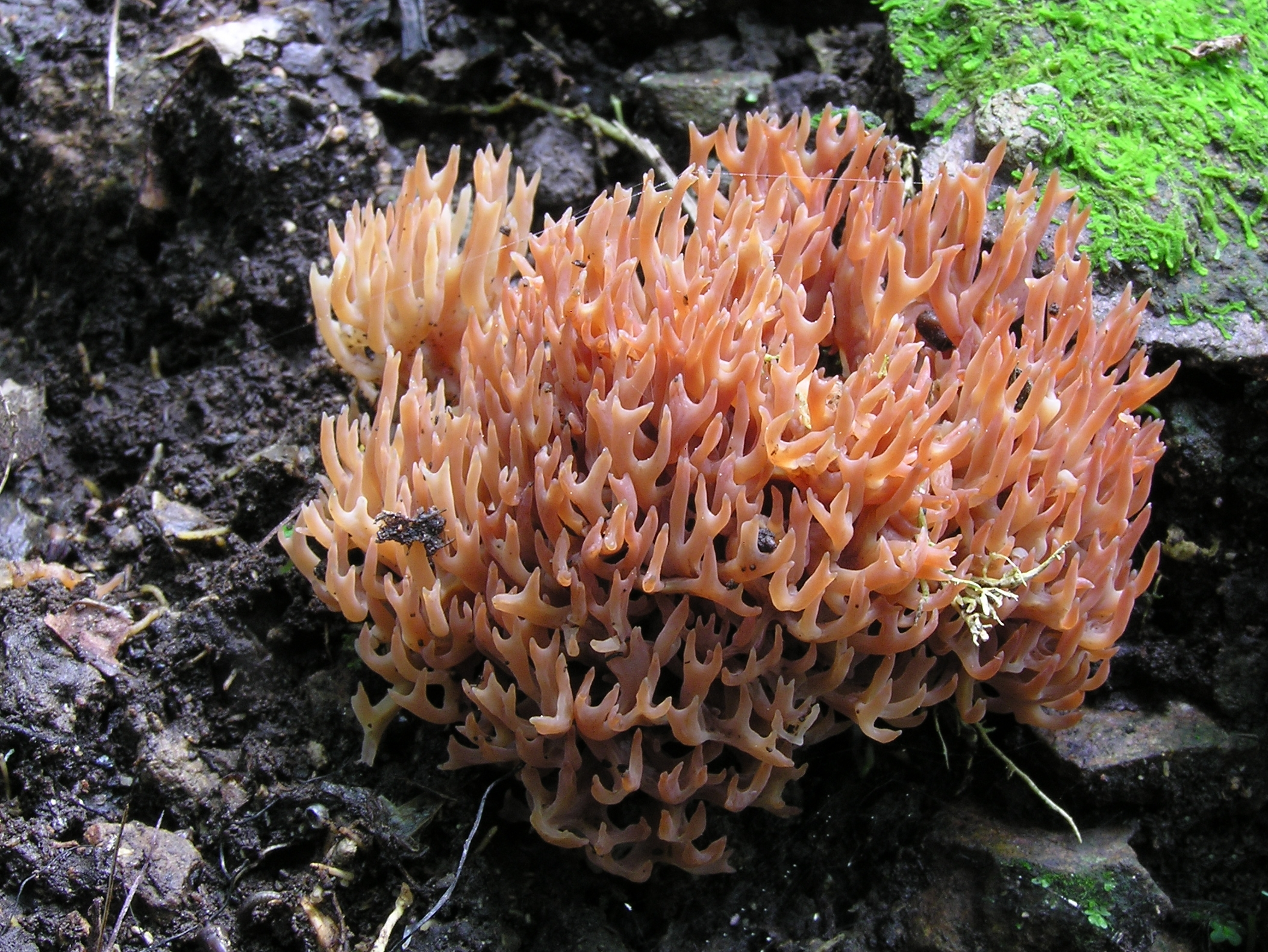
Ramariopsis ramarioides

In December 2024, Index Fungorum included more than 41 valid species of Ramariopsis. Petersen described over a dozen new species from New Zealand in 1988.

- R. agglutinata R.H.Petersen 1988 – New Zealand
- R. alutacea R.H.Petersen 1988 – New Zealand
- R. asperulospora (G.F.Atk.) Corner 1950
- R. asterella (G.F.Atk.) Corner 1950
- R. atlantica (Gibertoni) 2016 - Brazil
- R. avellanea R.H.Petersen 1988 – New Zealand
- R. avellaneo-inversa R.H.Petersen 1988 – New Zealand
- R. bicolor R.H.Petersen 1988 – New Zealand
- R. californica R.H.Petersen 1969
- R. cinnamomipes R.H.Petersen 1978
- R. citrina Schild 1971
- R. clavuligera (R.Heim) Corner 1950
- R. costaricensis L.D.Gómez 1972
- R. cremicolor R.H.Petersen 1988 – New Zealand
- R. crocea (Pers.) Corner 1950
- R. flavescens R.H.Petersen 1969
- R. gilibertoi Agnello 2019
- R. hibernica Corner 1971
- R. hirtipes 2020
- R. junquillea R.H.Petersen 1988 – New Zealand
- R. kunzei (Fr.) Corner 1950
- R. longipes R.H.Petersen 1988 – New Zealand
- R. luteotenerrima (Overeem) R.H.Petersen 1988 – New Zealand
- R. novae-hibernica Corner 1971
- R. ovispora R.H.Petersen 1988 – New Zealand
- R. pseudosubtilis R.H.Petersen 1969
- R. pulchella (Boud.) Corner 1950
- R. ramarioides R.H.Petersen 1988 – New Zealand
- R. robusta Matouš & Holec 2017
- R. rufipes (G.F. Atk.) 1964
- R. subtilis (Pers.) R.H.Petersen 1978
- R. tenuicula (Bourdot & Galzin) R.H.Petersen 1969
- R. tortuosa R.H.Petersen 1988 – New Zealand

== See also ==
- List of Agaricales genera
