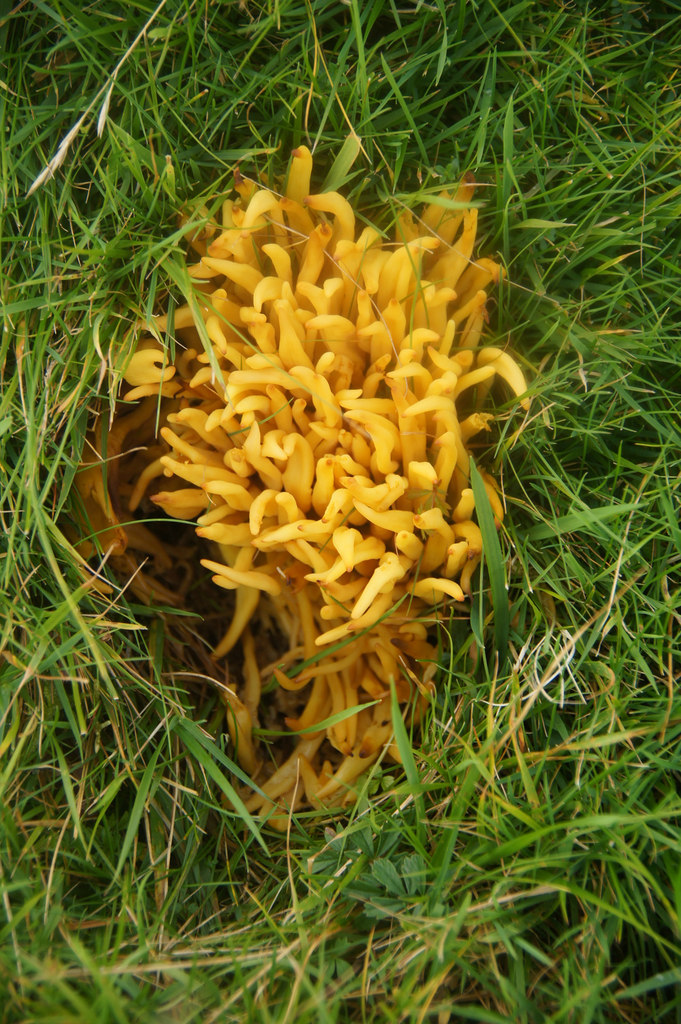
- Clavulinopsis fusiformis in grassland, Shetland

Scientific classification
- Kingdom: Fungi
- Division: Basidiomycota
- Class: Agaricomycetes
- Order: Agaricales
- Family: Clavariaceae
- Genus: Clavulinopsis
- Species: C. fusiformis

Binomial name
- Clavulinopsis fusiformis (Sowerby) Corner (1950)

Synonyms
- Clavaria fusiformis Sowerby (1799); Clavaria inaequalis var. fusiformis (Sowerby) Fr. (1828); Ramariopsis fusiformis (Sowerby) R.H.Petersen (1978)

= Clavulinopsis fusiformis =

Species of fungus

Clavulinopsis fusiformis is a clavarioid fungus in the family Clavariaceae. In the UK, it has been given the recommended English name of golden spindles. In North America it has also been called spindle-shaped yellow coral or golden fairy spindle. It was originally described from England and is part of an unresolved species complex.

Clavulinopsis fusiformis forms cylindrical, bright yellow fruit bodies that grow in dense clusters on the ground in agriculturally unimproved grassland or in woodland litter.

== Taxonomy ==
The species was first described in 1799 by English botanist and mycologist James Sowerby from collections made in Hampstead Heath in London. It was transferred to Clavulinopsis by English mycologist E.J.H. Corner in 1950. Initial molecular research, based on cladistic analysis of DNA sequences, indicates that C. fusiformis is part of a complex of related species.

=== Etymology ===
The specific epithet fusiformis, derived from Latin, means "spindle-shaped".

== Description ==
The fruit bodies are cylindrical, bright yellow, growing up to 11 centimetres (4 1/4 in) tall in fasciculate (densely crowded) clusters of unbranched 'fingers' under 1 cm thick. Microscopically, the hyphae are hyaline, up to 12 μm in diameter, with clamp connections. The basidiospores are hyaline, smooth, globose to subglobose, 4.5 to 7.5 μm, with a large apiculus.

=== Similar species ===
In European grasslands, Clavulinopsis helvola, C. laeticolor, and C. luteoalba have similarly coloured, simple fruit bodies but are typically smaller and grow singly or sparsely clustered. The uncommon Clavaria amoenoides produces densely clustered fruit bodies but they are pale yellow and, microscopically, lack clamp connections. Ramariopsis kunzei bears a resemblance.

== Distribution and habitat ==
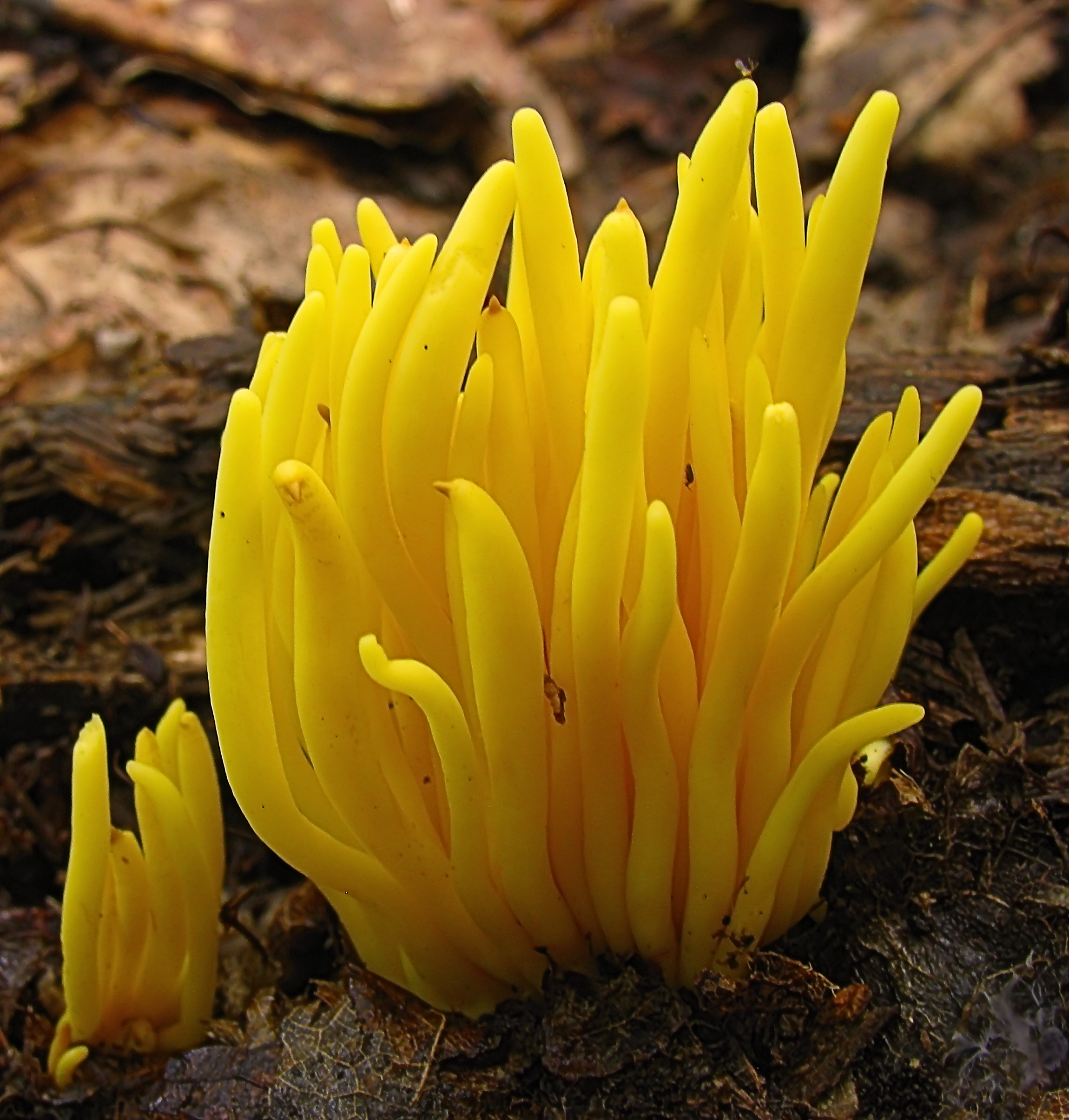
Growing in woodland, West Virginia

The species was initially described from England and is common throughout Europe. Its distribution outside Europe is uncertain because of confusion with similar, closely related species in the complex. Clavulinopsis fusiformis sensu lato has been reported from North America, Central and South America, and Asia, including Iran, China, Nepal, and Japan.

The species typically occurs in large, dense clusters on the ground and is presumed to be saprotrophic. In Europe it generally occurs in agriculturally unimproved, short-sward grassland (pastures and lawns). Such waxcap grasslands are a declining and threatened habitat, but C. fusiformis is one of the commoner species and is not currently considered of conservation concern. Elsewhere, C. fusiformis sensu lato occurs in woodland. In China it is one of the dominant macrofungal species found in Fargesia spathacea-dominated community forest at an elevation of 2,600–3,500 metres (8,500–11,500 ft).

== Uses ==
Fruit bodies are commonly collected and consumed in Nepal, where the fungus is known locally as Kesari chyau.

Extracts from Japan have been found to contain an anti-B red blood cell agglutinin protein.
