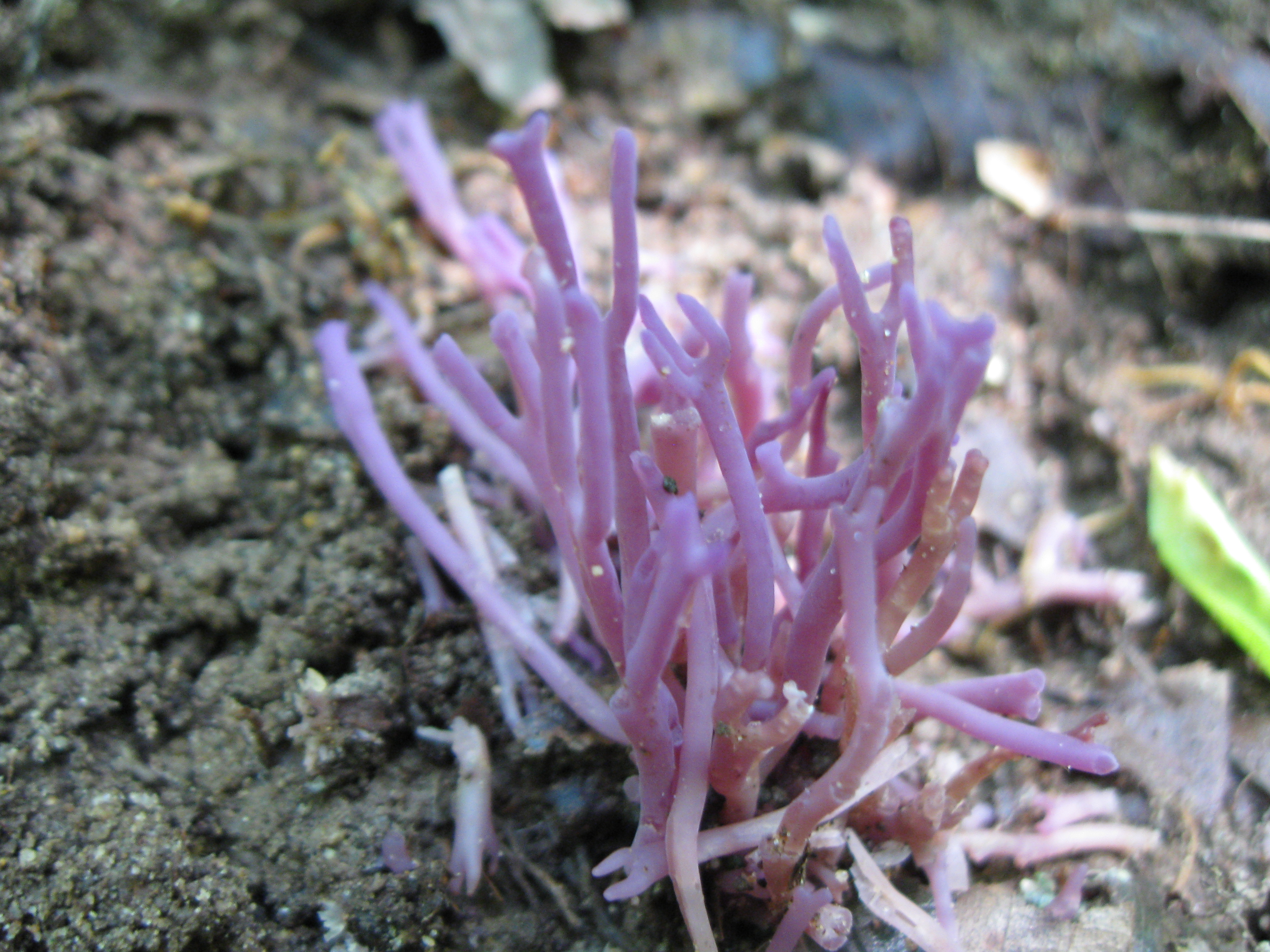

Scientific classification
- Domain: Eukaryota
- Kingdom: Fungi
- Division: Basidiomycota
- Class: Agaricomycetes
- Order: Agaricales
- Family: Clavariaceae
- Genus: Ramariopsis
- Species: R. pulchella

Binomial name
- Ramariopsis pulchella (Boud.) Corner (1950)

Synonyms
- Clavaria pulchella Boud. (1887); Clavulinopsis pulchella (Boud.) Jülich (1985)

= Ramariopsis pulchella =

Species of fungus

Ramariopsis pulchella is a species of coral fungus in the family Clavariaceae. Originally named Clavaria pulchella by Jean Louis Émile Boudier in 1887, the species was transferred to Ramariopsis by E.J.H. Corner in 1950. The fungus has a cosmopolitan distribution.
