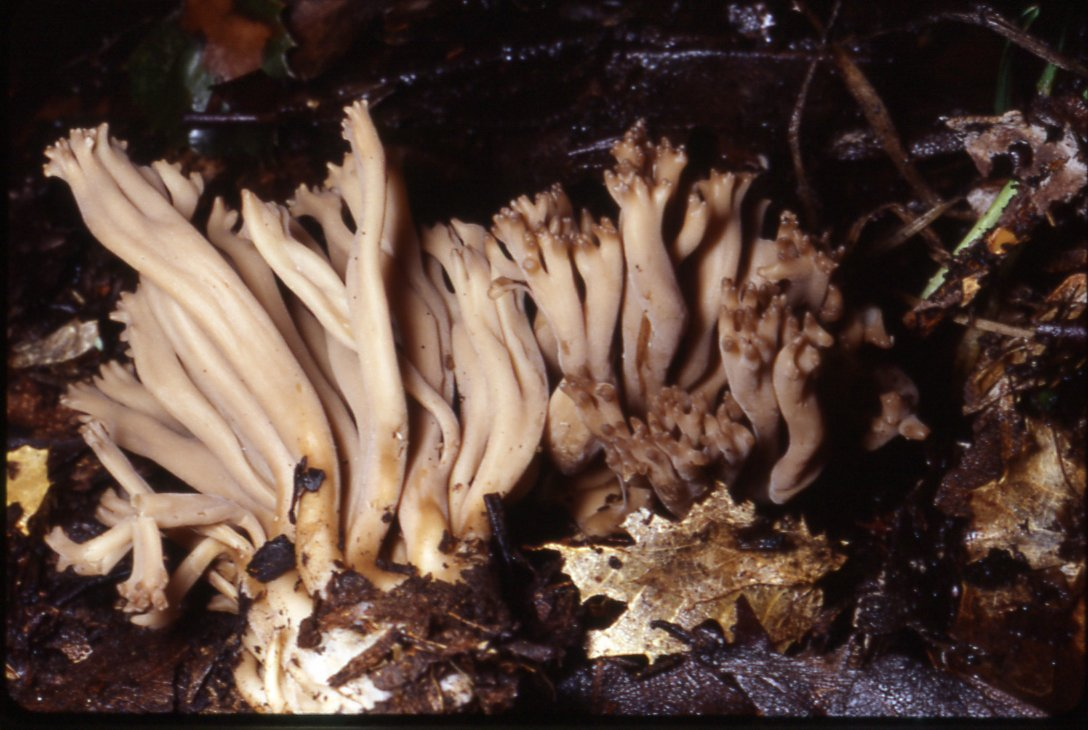

Scientific classification
- Kingdom: Fungi
- Division: Basidiomycota
- Class: Agaricomycetes
- Order: Agaricales
- Family: Clavariaceae
- Genus: Clavulinopsis
- Species: C. umbrinella

Binomial name
- Clavulinopsis umbrinella (Sacc.) Corner (1950)

Synonyms
- Clavaria umbrina Berk. (1860); Clavaria umbrinella Sacc. (1888); Clavaria holmskjoldii Oudem. (1902); Clavulinopsis holmskjoldii (Oudem.) Corner (1950); Clavulinopsis cinereoides (G.F. Atk.) Corner; Ramariopsis holmskjoldii (Oudem.) R.H.Petersen (1978); Ramariopsis umbrinella (Sacc.) R.H.Petersen (1978)

= Clavulinopsis umbrinella =

Species of fungus

Clavulinopsis umbrinella, commonly known as the beige coral, is a coral mushroom in the family Clavariaceae. Fruit bodies are initially white before turning pale brown with darker brown tips. Originally described in 1860, it is known to occur in Europe and North America where it grows in grass. It is not a common species.

== Taxonomy ==
The species was first described by Miles Joseph Berkeley in 1860 as Clavaria umbrina. This name was an illegitimate homonym. Pier Andrea Saccardo described it as Clavaria umbrinella in 1888. E.J.H. Corner transferred the species to the genus Clavulinopsis in 1950. It is commonly known as the "beige coral".

== Description ==
The multiply branched fruit bodies grow to heights of 2–4.5 cm (0.8–1.8 in). The branches are initially white before darkening to pale brown and umber, usually with darker tips. The stipe is short, white, and shaggy with long hairs. Branches are 1–2.5 mm (0.04–0.10 in) wide, and clustered and erect below, branching first polychotomously (multiply branched), and then irregularly dichotomously (divided in two branches). The flesh, initially white before becoming brown in age, is firm and hard. It has no distinctive taste, and a "pleasant" smell.

The spores are roughly spherical to pip-shaped, smooth, contain a single oil droplet, and measure 4–6.7 by 3–6 μm. The basidia (spore-bearing cells) are quite long, measuring 70–95 by 8–9 μm before tapering to a narrow base about 2.5 μm wide. They are four-spored, with the spores attached to sterigmata that are 8–10 μm long.

== Habitat and distribution ==
The fruit bodies of Clavulinopsis umbrinella grow in grass. In Europe, it is uncommon, having been reported from Great Britain, France, and the Czech Republic. It is also found in North America.

In 2014, it was claimed that the species had been discovered for the first time in Scotland in the grounds of Napier University's Craiglockhart Campus, which Napier acquired in 1986. During the First World War the property served as a military hospital and was used to treat shell-shocked officers. The poets Wilfred Owen and Siegfried Sassoon met when they were treated there in 1917. Ecologist Abbie Patterson made the discovery on a lawn at the campus and has come up with a "quirky theory" that soldiers' boots may have picked up spores in the mud of the Flanders Fields. As evidence, Patterson offers a photograph of soldiers and nurses lined up on the same spot that he made his discovery. (Patterson has discovered several other rare species in the grounds, an outcome he attributes to the absence of weedkillers.) However, the National Biodiversity Network's Gateway site indicates that the species has been recorded in Scotland on about twenty previous occasions though Patterson's find was the first to be verified. This verification was clarified by Roy Watling, a Scottish mycologist who has made significant contributions to the study of fungi both in identification of new species and correct taxonomic placement, as well as in fungal ecology. The National Biodiversity Network is a crowd-sourced site and is not considered reliable evidence.
