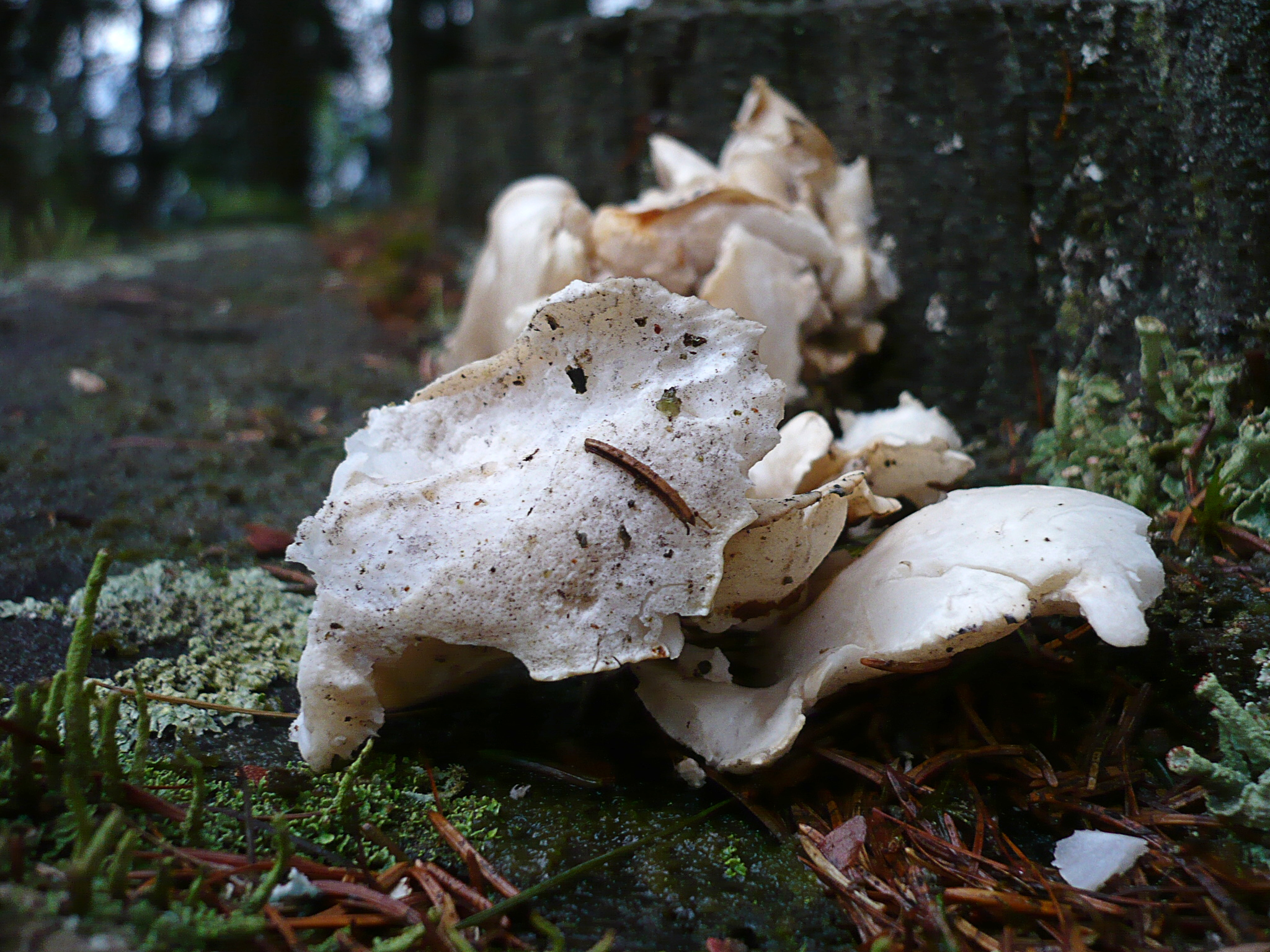

Scientific classification
- Kingdom: Fungi
- Division: Basidiomycota
- Class: Agaricomycetes
- Order: Polyporales
- Family: Dacryobolaceae
- Genus: Osteina; Donk (1966)

Type species
- Osteina obducta (Berk.) Donk (1966)

= Osteina =

Genus of fungi

Osteina is a fungal genus in the family Dacryobolaceae.

== Taxonomy ==
The genus was circumscribed by mycologist Marinus Anton Donk in 1966, with Polyporus obductus as the type species.

Catalogue of Life lists 3 accepted species:

- Osteina obducta (Berk.) Donk
- Osteina rhodophila (Spirin & Zmitr.) Bernicchia & Gorjón
- Osteina undosa (Peck) Zmitr.

== Description ==
Osteina is characterized by fruit bodies that are sessile to stipitate, which are bone hard when dry. It has a monomitic hyphal system, containing only generative hyphae with clamps. The spores are hyaline and thin-walled, and are inamyloid and acyanophilic. Osteina causes a brown rot in gymnosperm wood.
