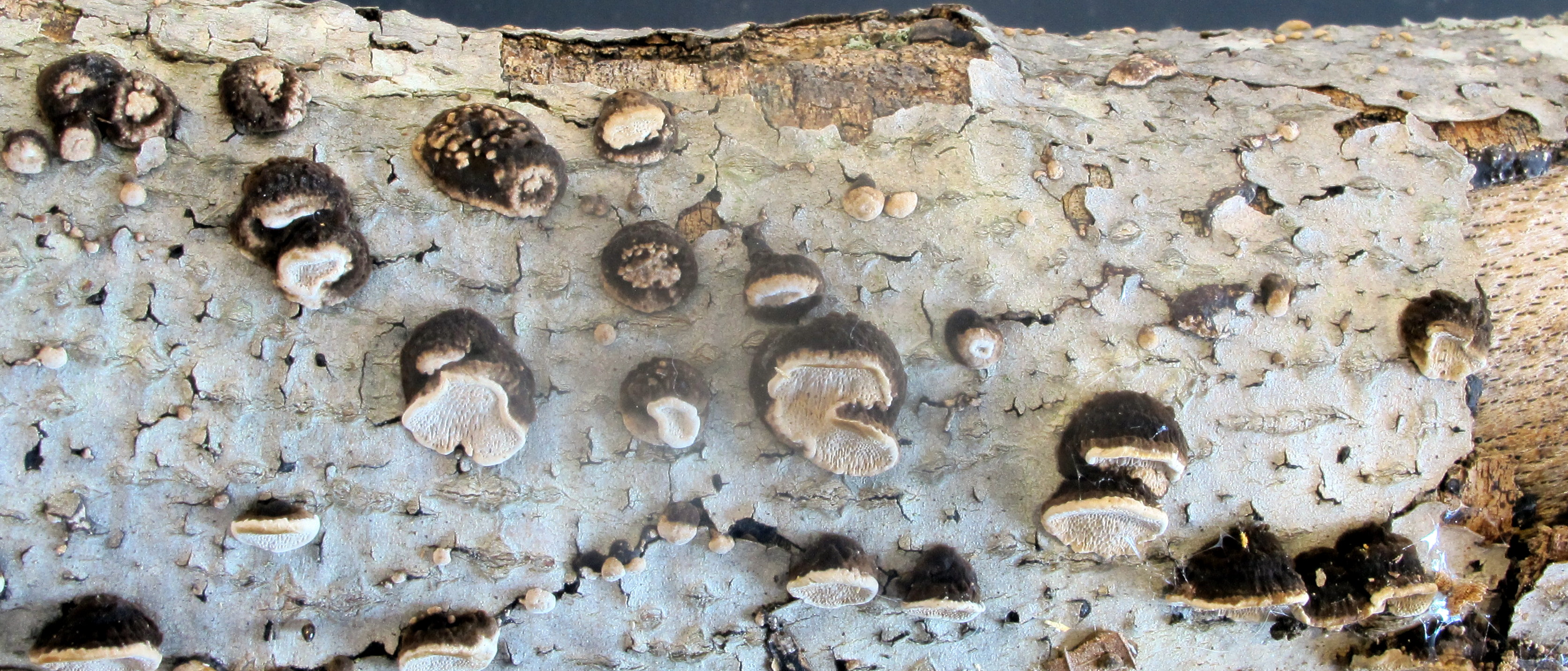
- Datroniella scutellata

Scientific classification
- Kingdom: Fungi
- Division: Basidiomycota
- Class: Agaricomycetes
- Order: Polyporales
- Family: Polyporaceae
- Genus: Datroniella; B.K.Cui, Hai J.Li & Y.C.Dai (2014)

Type species
- Datroniella scutellata (Schwein.) B.K.Cui, Hai J.Li & Y.C.Dai (2014)

= Datroniella =

Genus of fungi

Datroniella is a genus of poroid crust fungi in the family Polyporaceae. It was circumscribed in 2014 by Chinese mycologists as a segregate genus from Datronia. Datroniella differs from Datronia by their moderately to frequently branched skeletal hyphae in the context, and absence of dendrohyphidia (modified terminal hyphae in the hymenium). The type species of Datroniella is D. scutellata, a fungus originally described as Polyporus scutellatus by Lewis David de Schweinitz. Datroniella fungi cause a white rot, usually on angiosperm wood.

== Species ==
- Datroniella melanocarpa B.K.Cui, Hai J.Li & Y.C.Dai (2014) – China
- Datroniella minuta Lira & Ryvarden (2016) – Brazil
- Datroniella scutellata (Schwein.) B.K.Cui, Hai J.Li & Y.C.Dai (2014)
- Datroniella subtropica B.K.Cui, Hai J.Li & Y.C.Dai (2014) – China
- Datroniella tibetica B.K.Cui, Hai J.Li & Y.C.Dai (2014) – China
- Datroniella tropica B.K.Cui, Hai J.Li & Y.C.Dai (2014) – China
