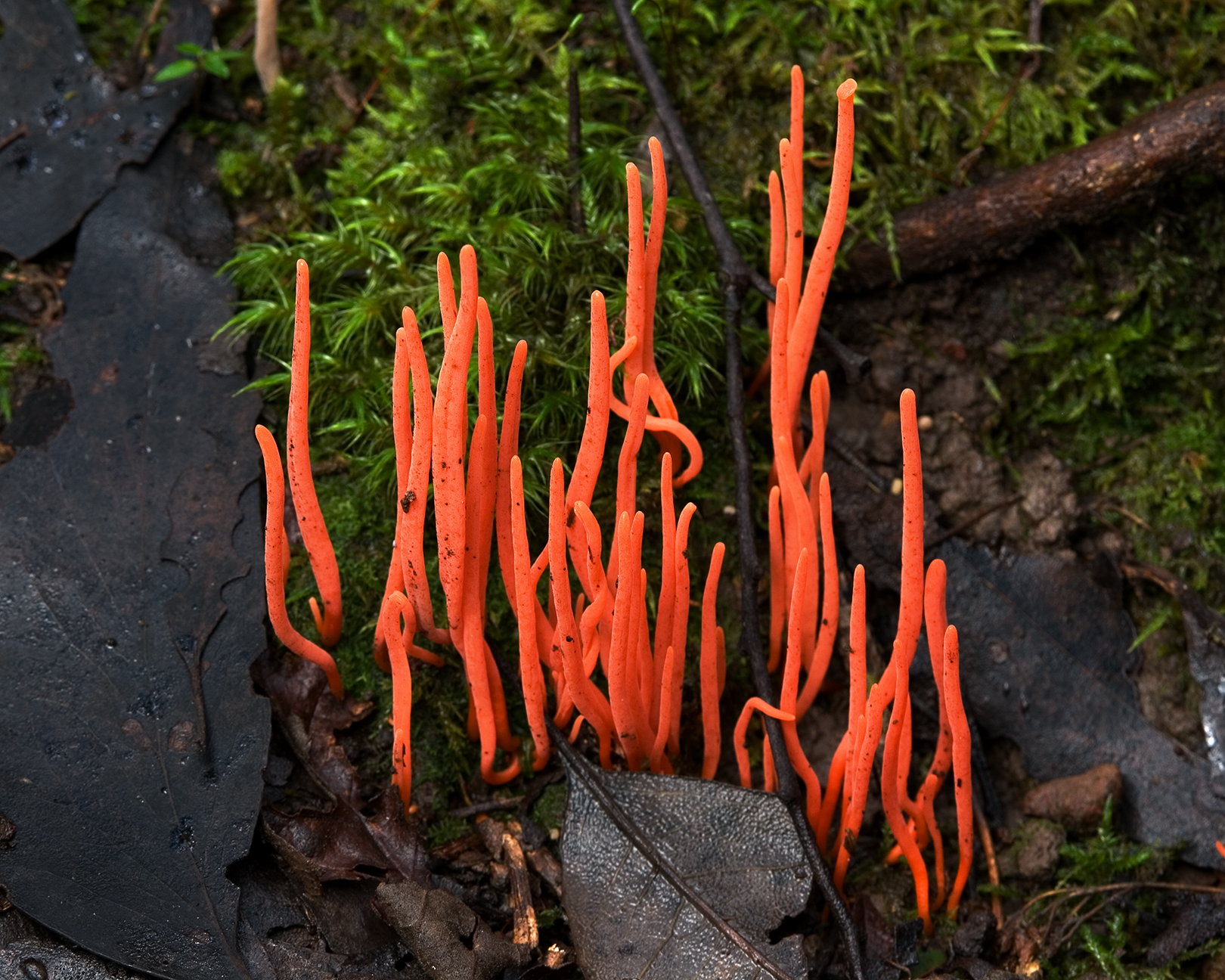
- Clavulinopsis corallinorosacea

Scientific classification
- Kingdom: Fungi
- Division: Basidiomycota
- Class: Agaricomycetes
- Order: Agaricales
- Family: Clavariaceae
- Genus: Clavulinopsis; Overeem (1923)

Type species
- Clavulinopsis sulcata Overeem (1923)

Synonyms
- Ramaria Holmsk. (1790); Cornicularia Bonord. (1851); Donkella Doty (1950)

= Clavulinopsis =

Genus of fungi

Clavulinopsis is a genus of coral fungi in the family Clavariaceae. The genus, first described scientifically by Casper van Overeem in 1923, has a widespread distribution.

The name means "having the appearance of Clavulina".

== Species ==
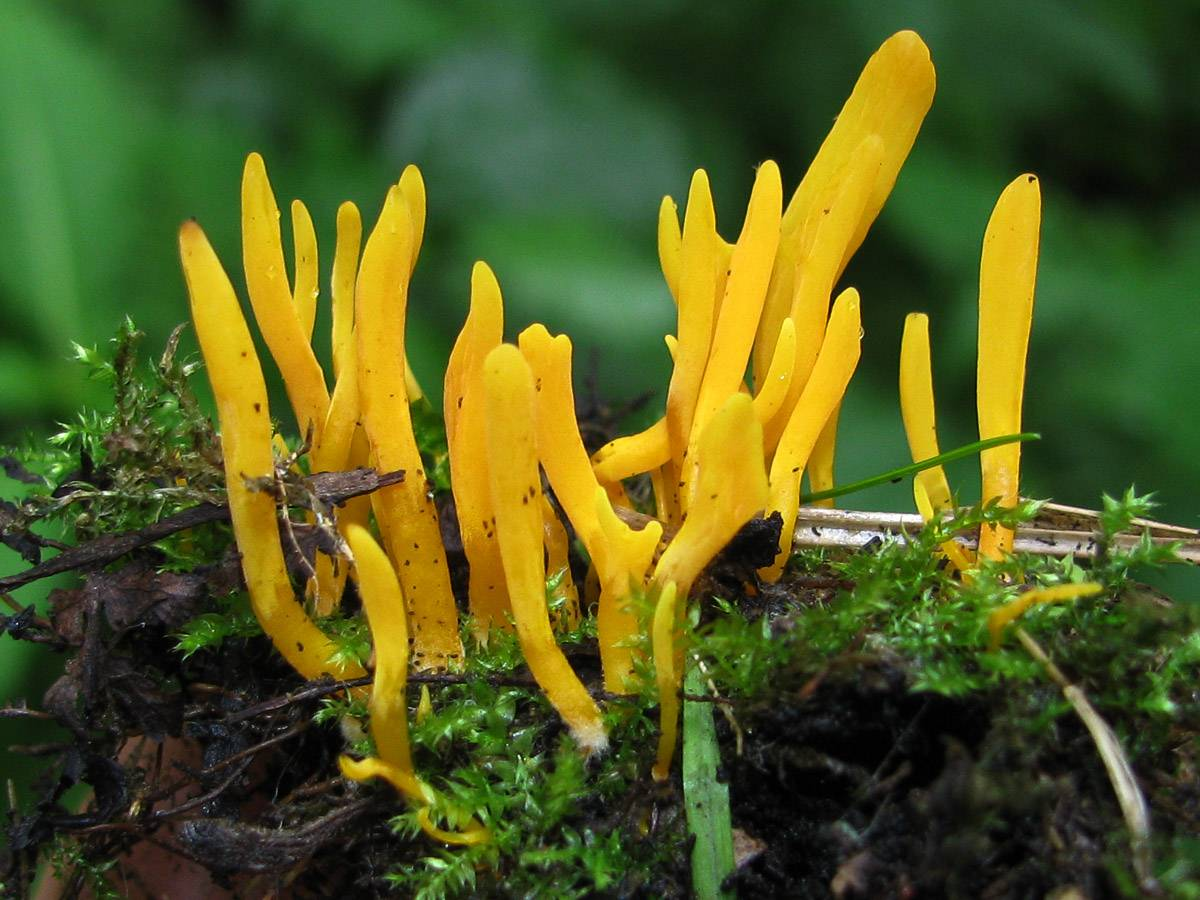
C. helvola

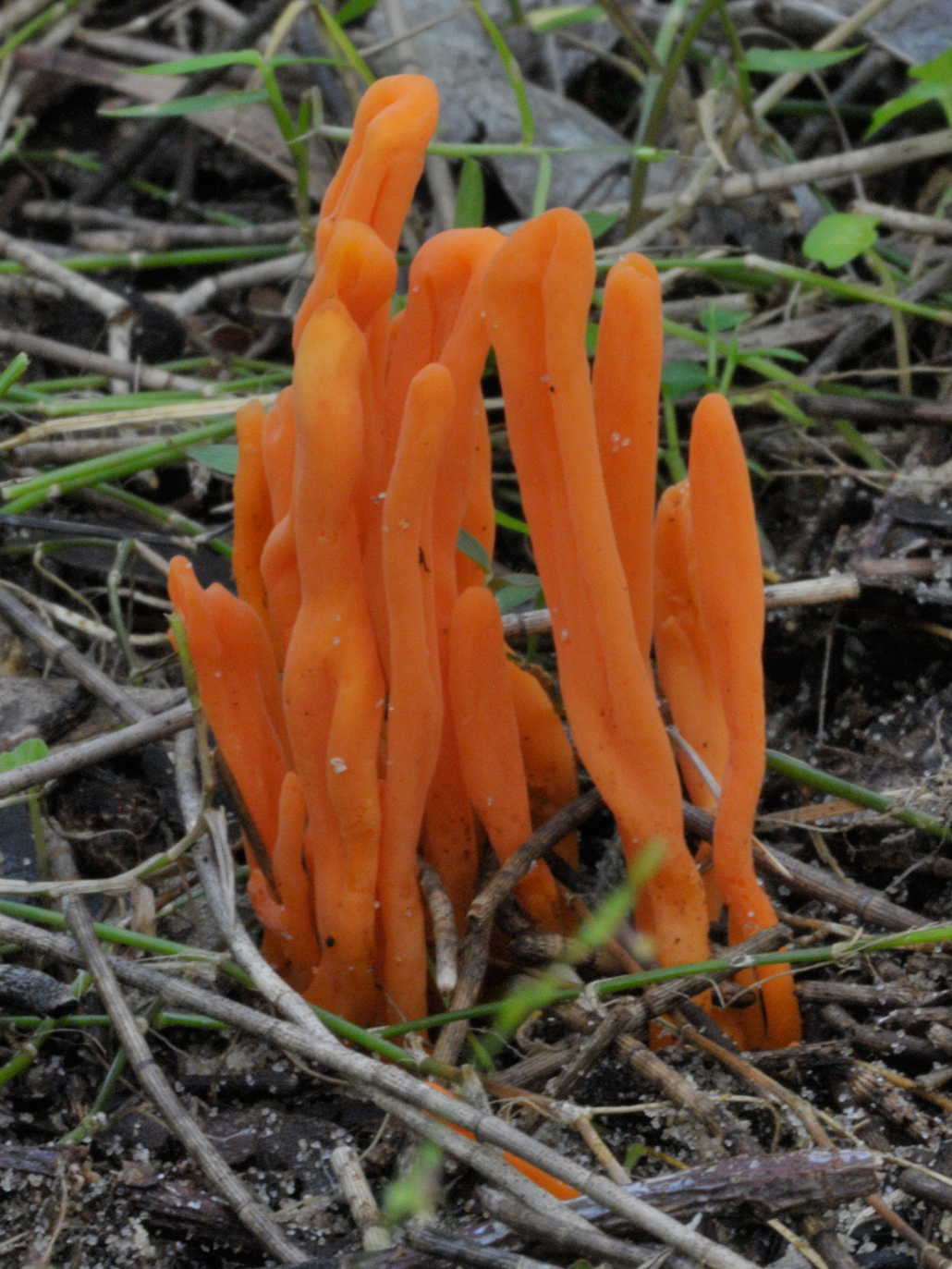
C. sulcata

As of August 2015, Index Fungorum lists 67 valid species in Clavulinopsis:

- C. alcicornis
- C. amoena
- C. antillarum
- C. appalachiensis
- C. archeri
- C. arctica
- C. arenicola
- C. aurantia
- C. aurantiobrunnea
- C. aurantiocinnabarina
- C. boninensis
- C. brevipes
- C. candida
- C. carneola
- C. cinnamomea
- C. cirrata
- C. citrinoalba
- C. coliformis
- C. corallinorosacea
- C. corniculata
- C. depokensis
- C. daigremontiana
- C. depokensis
- C. dichotoma
- C. fleischeriana
- C. fruticula
- C. fusiformis
- C. graveolens
- C. griseola
- C. helvola
- C. hexaspora
- C. hisingeri
- C. hexaspora
- C. laeticolor
- C. ledermannii
- C. lignicola
- C. liguloides
- C. lingula
- C. luteo-ochracea
- C. luteoalba
- C. luteonana
- C. luticola
- C. michelii
- C. miyabeana
- C. moricolor
- C. ochracea
- C. propera
- C. punicea
- C. pusilla
- C. rufipes
- C. semivestita
- C. septentrionalis
- C. sibutiana
- C. solomonensis
- C. spathuliformis
- C. spiculosa
- C. spiralis
- C. subarctica
- C. subfastigiata
- C. subflava
- C. subumbrinella
- C. sulcata
- C. sulphurascens
- C. tenella
- C. tenerrima
- C. tetragona
- C. umbrina
- C. umbrinella
- C. yakusimensis

== See also ==
- List of Agaricales genera
