= Datroniella tropica =

Scientific classification
- Kingdom: Fungi
- Division: Basidiomycota
- Class: Agaricomycetes
- Order: Polyporales
- Family: Polyporaceae
- Genus: Datroniella
- Species: D. tropica

Binomial name
- Datroniella tropica B.K.Cui, Hai J.Li & Y.C.Dai (2014)

Species of fungus

Datroniella tropica is a species of crust fungus in the family Polyporaceae. Found in southwestern China, it was described as a new species in 2014 by mycologists Bao-Kai Cui, Hai J. Lee, and Yu-Cheng Dai, who placed it in the new genus Datroniella. The type collection was made in Tongbiguan Nature Reserve (Longchuan County, Yunnan), where the fungus was found growing on a fallen angiosperm branch. The specific epithet tropica refers to its distribution in tropical China.

== Description ==
The fruit body of D. tropica is effused-reflexed, meaning it is like a crust fungus with the margins extended and bent backwards to form rudimentary caps. These caps project up to 2 cm (0.8 in), and are 2 cm (0.8 in) wide and 2.5 mm (0.10 in) thick at their base. The smooth cap surface is yellowish brown to reddish brown. The pore surface, initially white to cream, becomes brown when bruised and grey when dried. The small round pores number about 5–7 per millimetre.

Datroniella tropica has a dimitic hyphal system, containing both generative and skeletal hyphae. Its smooth, thin-walled spores measure 8–9.8 by 2.5–3.5 μm, and usually contain up to three oil droplets. Datroniella subtropica is similar in appearance, but has smaller spores that are 6.8–8 by 2–2.7 μm.
