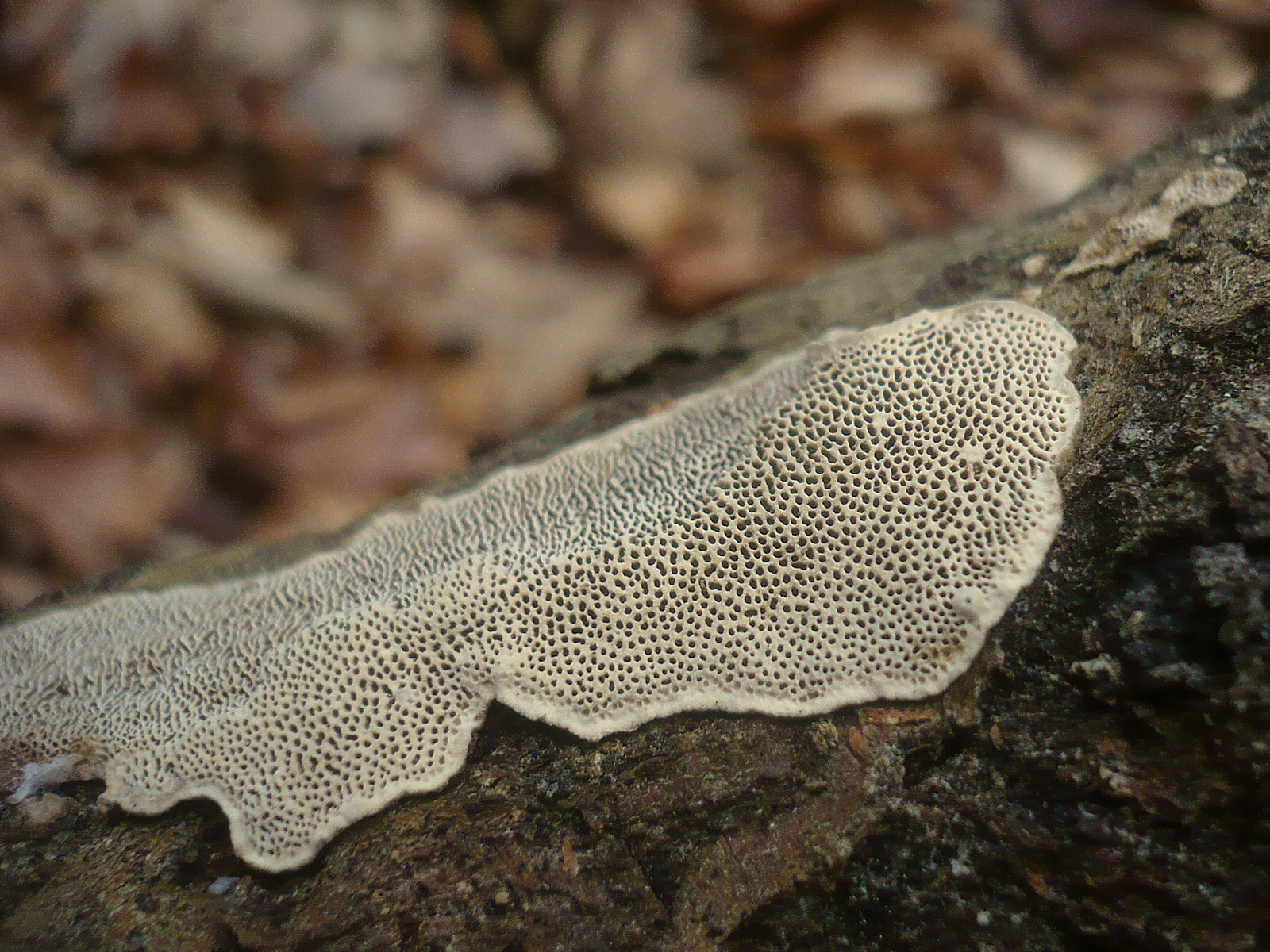
- Datronia mollis

Scientific classification
- Kingdom: Fungi
- Division: Basidiomycota
- Class: Agaricomycetes
- Order: Polyporales
- Family: Polyporaceae
- Genus: Datronia; Donk (1966)

Type species
- Datronia mollis (Sommerf.) Donk (1966)

= Datronia =

Genus of fungi

Datronia is a genus of poroid crust fungi in the family Polyporaceae. The genus was circumscribed by Marinus Anton Donk in 1966, with Datronia mollis as the type species. Datronia fungi cause a white rot in hardwoods. Datronia contains six species found in northern temperate areas. The most recent addition, Datronia ustulatiligna, was described in 2015 from Himachal Pradesh in India.

== Taxonomy ==
Datronia was circumscribed by Dutch mycologist Marinus Anton Donk in 1966 to contain two species, the type, Datronia mollis, and D. epilobii. Donk explained that the genus description was abbreviated, as his intention was only to validly publish the genus, and that several contemporary authors had already accepted the name.

Datronia is in the core polyporoid clade, a phylogenetic grouping of species first identified by Binder and colleagues in 2005. The clade contains many of the genera traditionally associated with the families Polyporaceae and Ganodermataceae. Within the core polyporoid clade, it is part of the polyporus clade, which includes the polyphyletic genus Polyporus, as well as the genera Cryptoporus, Daedaleopsis, Earliella, Megasporoporia, and Microporus. In 2014, Datronia scutellata was transferred to the new genus Datroniella when molecular analysis showed that it was not closely related to D. mollis and D. stereoides.

== Species ==
- Datronia decipiens (Bres.) Ryvarden (1988)
- Datronia glabra Ryvarden (1987) – Venezuela
- Datronia mollis (Sommerf.) Donk (1966)
- Datronia orcomanta Robledo & Rajchenb. (2006) – Argentina
- Datronia parvispora Ryvarden (2014)
- Datronia perstrata (Corner) T.Hatt. & Sotome (2013) – Asia
- Datronia sajanensis (Parmasto) Domanski (1974)
- Datronia sepiicolor (Corner) T.Hatt. & Sotome (2013) – Asia
- Datronia stereoides (Fr.) Ryvarden (1968)
