= Casper van Overeem =

Dutch mycologist (1893–1927)

Casper van Overeem (1 October 1893 – 28 February 1927) was a Dutch mycologist who pioneered the systematic study of tropical fungi in the Dutch East Indies (present‑day Indonesia). Initially trained as a teacher, he developed his scientific expertise under the botanist Hugo de Vries before earning his doctorate from the University of Zurich in 1920 with research on chromosome variations in Oenothera. At Buitenzorg (now Bogor), he established a mycology department at the botanical gardens' herbarium and authored the illustrated series Icones Fungorum Malayensium alongside numerous scientific publications. His career was cut short by tuberculosis at age 33, but his meticulously detailed work and extensive collections established a foundation for tropical mycology, leading to multiple fungal taxa being named in his honour.

== Early life and education ==
Casper van Overeem was born in Weesp, Netherlands, on 1 October 1893. He attended primary school in Weesp and, in 1912, obtained a teaching qualification from a teacher training college in Amsterdam. From the age of 15, he illustrated plants and animals, focusing on morphological details observable at high magnification and combining scientific accuracy with artistic skill.

== Academic career ==
In 1913, van Overeem became private assistant to the botanist Hugo de Vries at the University of Amsterdam, where he received training in microscopy (the use of microscopes to examine small structures) and cytology (the study of cells). By 1919 he qualified to teach both botany and zoology and had already begun publishing on fungal taxonomy and cell biology. To pursue a doctoral degree—unattainable in his native Netherlands due to his prior qualifications—he enrolled at the University of Zurich, earning his PhD in Botany and Zoology in July 1920. His dissertation, Ueber Formen mit abweichender Chromosomenzahl bei Oenothera, investigated variations in chromosome number.

== Work in the Dutch East Indies ==
In December 1920, van Overeem travelled to Buitenzorg (now Bogor, Indonesia) to establish a mycology department at the herbarium and museum for systematic botany of the Bogor Botanical Gardens. There, he collaborated with Professor Weese of the University of Vienna on the illustrated series Icones Fungorum Malayensium, which comprised 16 regular issues and one supplementary issue, most authored by van Overeem. Between 1922 and 1925, he published more than 25 articles—many in the journal De Tropische Natuur—introducing European scientists to the diversity of tropical fungi.

== Health challenges and death ==
Shortly after his arrival in the Dutch East Indies, van Overeem developed tuberculosis, an infectious disease affecting the lungs, which periodically confined him to bed. Despite medical advice to seek treatment in Europe, he remained to continue his research. His health declined further in June 1926, and although he briefly improved in September—during which he completed several publications—he was advised that full recovery would require years away from work. He planned to return to Europe on 9 March 1927 but died in Buitenzorg on 28 February 1927, aged 33.

== Legacy ==
Van Overeem's pioneering studies and extensive collections laid the foundation for modern tropical mycology in Indonesia. His detailed illustrations and taxonomic descriptions of Malay fungi continue to serve as important references for mycologists and historians of science.

== Eponymous taxa ==
- Overeemia G.Arnaud (1954)
- Catillaria overeemii Zahlbr. (1928)
- Chiodecton overeemii Zahlbr. (1928)
- Entoloma overeemii E.Horak (1977)
- Graphis overeemii Zahlbr. (1928)
- Lecidea overeemii Zahlbr. (1928)
- Parmelia overeemii Zahlbr. (1928)
- Phaeographis overeemii Zahlbr. (1928)
- Pleuroflammula overeemii E.Horak (1978)
- Psilocybe overeemii E.Horak & Desjardin (2006)
- Ustilago overeemii Cif. (1933)

== See also ==
- List of mycologists
