= Ron Petersen =

American mycologist (born 1934)

- Born: 1934 (age 91–92)
- Education: Columbia University (Ph.D., 1961)
- Scientific career
- Fields: Mycology
- Workplaces: University of Tennessee
- Author abbrev. (botany): R.H.Petersen

Ronald H. Petersen, more commonly known as Ron Petersen, born in 1934, is a mycologist and professor emeritus at the University of Tennessee known for his work on chanterelle mushrooms and the genus Flammulina.

He was the editor-in-chief of the journal Mycologia from 1986 to 1990.

== See also ==
- Category:Taxa named by Ron Petersen
