= List of fungi of South Africa – C =

This is an alphabetical list of the fungal taxa as recorded from South Africa. Currently accepted names have been appended.

== Ca ==
Genus: Caeoma Link 1809, accepted as Puccinia Pers., (1794) (Rusts)

- Caeoma clematidis Thüm. 1876
- Caeoma heteromorphae Doidge 1927
- Caeoma lichtensteiniae Doidge 1941,
- Caeoma nervisequum Thüm. 1877 accepted as Milesina nervisequa (Thüm.) P. Syd. & Syd., (1915)
- Caeoma (Aecidium) resinaecola Rud. accepted as Caeoma resinicola F. Rudolphi, (1829)
- Caeoma ricini Schltdl. 1826

Family: Caliciaceae Chevall. 1826

Genus: Calicium Pers. 1794 (Lichens)

- Calicium turbinatum Pers. 1797 accepted as Sphinctrina turbinata Fr., (1825)

Genus: Callopisma De Not. 1847 accepted as Caloplaca Th. Fr., (1860)

- Callopisma capense A. Massal. 1861 as capensis
- Callopisma cinnabarinum (Ach.) Müll. Arg. 1881 accepted as Brownliella cinnabarina (Ach.) S.Y. Kondr., Kärnefelt, A. Thell, Elix, Jung Kim, A.S. Kondr. & Hur, (2013)
- Callopisma cinnabarinum var. opacum Müll. Arg. 1881 accepted as Brownliella cinnabarina (Ach.) S.Y. Kondr., Kärnefelt, A. Thell, Elix, Jung Kim, A.S. Kondr. & Hur, (2013)
- Callopisma crocodes A. Massal. 1861
- Callopisma flavum Müll. Arg. 1893
- Callopisma haematodes A. Massal. 1861;
- Callopisma teicophilum A. Massal. 1861
- Callopisma zambesicum Müll. Arg. 1893

Genus: Calloriopsis Syd. & P. Syd. 1917

- Calloriopsis gelatinosa (Sacc.) Syd. & P. Syd. 1917, accepted as Calloriopsis herpotricha (Berk.) R. Sant., (1951)

Genus: Calocera (Fr.) Fr. 1828

- Calocera cornea (Batsch) Fr. 1827

Genus: Calonectria De Not. 1867

- Calonectria capensis Doidge 1924, accepted as Byssocallis capensis (Doidge) Rossman, (1979)
- Calonectria cephalosporii Hansf. 1946, accepted as Dimerosporiella cephalosporii (Hansf.) Rossman & Samuels, in Rossman, Samuels, Rogerson & Lowen, (1999)
- Calonectria decora (Wallr.) Sacc. 1878, accepted as Flammocladiella decora (Wallr.) Lechat & J. Fourn., (2018)
- Calonectria leucorrhodina (Mont.) Speg. 1881 accepted as Dimerosporiella leucorrhodina (Mont.) Rossman & Samuels, (1999)
- Calonectria meliolae Hansf. 1941
- Calonectria rigidiuscula (Berk. & Broome) Sacc., (1878), accepted as Albonectria rigidiuscula (Berk. & Broome) Rossman & Samuels (1999)
- Calonectria ugandae Hansf. 1941

Genus: Calopeltis Syd. 1925, accepted as Cyclotheca Theiss., (1914)

- Calopeltis jasmini Doidge 1942, accepted as Cyclotheca jasmini (Doidge) Arx, (1962)

Genus: Caloplaca Th. Fr. 1860, (Lichens)

- Caloplaca amphidoxa (Stizenb.) Zahlbr. 1930
- Caloplaca aurantiaca (Lightf.) Th. Fr. 1861, accepted as Blastenia ferruginea (Huds.) A. Massal.,(1852)
- Caloplaca aurantiaca f. fulva Zahlbr.
- Caloplaca benguellensis (Nyl.) Zahlbr. 1930
- Caloplaca calviniana Zahlbr. 1932
- Caloplaca capensis (A. Massal.) Zahlbr. 1930
- Caloplaca cardinalis Zahlbr. 1932
- Caloplaca carphinea var. scoriophila (A. Massal.) J. Steiner 1911 accepted as Usnochroma scoriophilum (A. Massal.) Søchting, Arup & Frödén, (2013)
- Caloplaca cataschista Zahlbr. 1936 [as catachista]
- Caloplaca cerina (Hedw.) Th. Fr. 1861
- Caloplaca cinnabarina (Ach.) Zahlbr. 1908, accepted as Brownliella cinnabarina (Ach.) S.Y. Kondr., Kärnefelt, A. Thell, Elix, Jung Kim, A.S. Kondr. & Hur, (2013)
- Caloplaca cinnabarina var. opaca (Müll. Arg.) Zahlbr. 1930, accepted as Brownliella cinnabarina (Ach.) S.Y. Kondr., Kärnefelt, A. Thell, Elix, Jung Kim, A.S. Kondr. & Hur, (2013)
- Caloplaca cinnabarina var. pallidior (Stizenb.) Jatta 1910
- Caloplaca cinnabarina var. subfulgescens (Nyl.) Zahlbr. 1930
- Caloplaca cinnabariza (Nyl.) Zahlbr. 1930
- Caloplaca coccinella (Stizenb.) Zahlbr. 1930
- Caloplaca conchiliata Zahlbr. 1932
- Caloplaca crocodes (A. Massal.) Zahlbr. 1930
- Caloplaca delectans Zahlbr. 1932
- Caloplaca diploplaca Zahlbr. 1932
- Caloplaca diploplaca var. gracilior Zahlbr. 1932
- Caloplaca discolorella Zahlbr. 1932
- Caloplaca ecklonii (A. Massal.) Zahlbr. 1931
- Caloplaca effusa G. Merr. ex Van der Byl 1931
- Caloplaca elegans (Link) Th.Fr. (1871), accepted as Xanthoria elegans (Link) Th.Fr. (1860)
- Caloplaca elegantissima (Nyl.) Zahlbr. 1931 accepted as Stellarangia elegantissima (Nyl.) Frödén, Arup & Søchting, (2013)
- Caloplaca eudoxa (Müll. Arg.) Zahlbr. 1931 accepted as Teloschistopsis eudoxa (Müll. Arg.) Frödén, Arup & Søchting, (2013)
- Caloplaca euelpis (Stizenb.) Zahlbr. 1930
- Caloplaca fecunda Zahlbr. 1932
- Caloplaca ferruginea (Huds.) Th. Fr. 1861, accepted as Blastenia ferruginea (Huds.) A. Massal., (1852)
- Caloplaca ferruginea f. erysibe Jatta 1900
- Caloplaca ferrugineovirens (Vain.) Zahlbr. 1932
- Caloplaca flava (Müll. Arg.) Zahlbr. 1930
- Caloplaca flavorubens (Nyl.) Zahlbr. 1931;
- Caloplaca flavovirescens (Wulfen) Dalla Torre & Sarnth. 1902, accepted as Gyalolechia flavovirescens (Wulfen) Søchting, Frödén & Arup, (2013)
- Caloplaca gracilescens Zahlbr. 1932
- Caloplaca granulosa Jatta. [sic] possibly (Müll. Arg.) J. Steiner 1894, accepted as Flavoplaca granulosa (Müll. Arg.) Arup, Frödén & Søchting, (2013)
- Caloplaca haematodes (A. Massal.) Zahlbr. 1930
- Caloplaca hampeana (A. Massal.) Zahlbr. 1930
- Caloplaca lamprocheila Flagey.
- Caloplaca leptopisma (Nyl.) Zahlbr. 1931
- Caloplaca leucoxantha (Müll. Arg.) Zahlbr. 1931
- Caloplaca massula (Stizenb.) Zahlbr. 1930
- Caloplaca mastophora (Vain.) Zahlbr. 1932
- Caloplaca mastophora var. flavorubescens Vain
- Caloplaca murorum Th. Fr. 1871, accepted as Calogaya saxicola (Hoffm.) Vondrák,(2016)
- Caloplaca neethlingii Zahlbr. 1936
- Caloplaca nideri var. pruinosula Zahlbr. 1926
- Caloplaca nolens Zahlbr. 1932
- Caloplaca odoardii (Bagl.) Zahlbr. 1930
- Caloplaca orichalcea (Stizenb.) Zahlbr. 1931
- Caloplaca pallidior (Müll. Arg.) Zahlbr. 1931
- Caloplaca pallidior f. opaca (Müll. Arg.) Zahlbr. 1932 accepted as Brownliella cinnabarina (Ach.) S.Y. Kondr., Kärnefelt, A. Thell, Elix, Jung Kim, A.S. Kondr. & Hur, (2013)
- Caloplaca perexigua Zahlbr. 1932
- Caloplaca phlogina (Ach.) Flagey 1886, accepted as Scythioria phlogina (Ach.) S.Y. Kondr., Kärnefelt, Elix, A. Thell & Hur, (2014)
- Caloplaca placidia (A. Massal.) J. Steiner 1916
- Caloplaca platyna Zahlbr. 1936
- Caloplaca poliotera (Nyl.) J. Steiner 1897
- Caloplaca punicea (Müll. Arg.) Jatta 1910
- Caloplaca pyracea Th.Fr. [sic], possibly (Ach.) Zwackh 1862, accepted as Athallia pyracea (Ach.) Arup, Frödén & Søchting, (2013)
- Caloplaca pyracea f. pyrithromoides (Nyl.) H. Olivier 1909
- Caloplaca pyracea f. subpicta Zahlbr. 1931
- Caloplaca pyracea var. pyrithroma (Ach.) Flagey 1888, accepted as Athallia pyracea (Ach.) Arup, Frödén & Søchting, (2013)
- Caloplaca pyropoecila (Nyl.) Zahlbr. 1931
- Caloplaca pyropoeciloides Zahlbr. 1932
- Caloplaca regalis (Vain.) Zahlbr. 1931 accepted as Polycauliona regalis (Vain.) Hue, (1908)
- Caloplaca regalis f. prostrata (Hue) Zahlbr. 1931 accepted as Polycauliona prostrata (Hue) C.W. Dodge, (1973)
- Caloplaca sophodes (Vain.) Zahlbr. 1932
- Caloplaca subcerina (Nyl.) Zahlbr. 1924
- Caloplaca subseptata Zahlbr. 1932
- Caloplaca subsoluta (Nyl.) Zahlbr. 1931 accepted as Squamulea subsoluta (Nyl.) Arup, Søchting & Frödén, (2013)
- Caloplaca subpunicolor Zahlbr.*
- Caloplaca sympageella (Vain.) Zahlbr. 1932
- Caloplaca tegularis (Ehrh.) Sandst. 1912
- Caloplaca teicophila (A. Massal.) Zahlbr. 1931
- Caloplaca theloschistoides Zahlbr. 1921 accepted as Polycauliona theloschistoides (Zahlbr.) C.W. Dodge, (1971)
- Caloplaca zambesica (Müll. Arg.) Zahlbr. 1931

Family: Caloplacaceae Zahlbr. 1908

Genus: Calosphaeria Tul. & C. Tul. 1863

- Calosphaeria cylindrica (Kalchbr. & Cooke) Sacc. 1882, accepted as Peroneutypa cylindrica (Kalchbr. & Cooke.) Berl., (1902)
- Calosphaeria princeps Tul. & C. Tul. 1863,

Genus: Calospora

- Calospora arausiaca (Fabre) Sacc. 1883, accepted as Coryneum arausiacum (Fabre) Senan., Maharachch. & K.D. Hyde [as 'arausiaca'], (2017)
- Calospora bottomleyae Doidge 1941,

Genus: Calothyrium Theiss. 1912, accepted as Asterinella Theiss., (1912)

- Calothyrium psychotriae Doidge 1922, accepted as Schiffnerula psychotriae (Doidge) S. Hughes, (1987)

Genus: Calvatia Fr. 1849

- Calvatia caelata (Bull.) Morgan (1890), accepted as Bovistella utriformis (Bull.) Demoulin & Rebriev, (2017)
- Calvatia candida (Rostk.) Hollós 1902
- Calvatia fontanesii Lloyd*
- Calvatia gigantea (Batsch) Lloyd 1904
- Calvatia incerta Bottomley 1948
- Calvatia lepidophora Lloyd [sic] possibly (Ellis & Everh.) Coker & Couch 1928;
- Calvatia lilacina (Mont. & Berk.) Henn. 1904
- Calvatia macrogemmae Lloyd 1923
- Calvatia olivacea (Cooke & Massee) Lloyd 1905
- Calvatia pachyderma (Peck) Morgan 1890, accepted as Langermannia pachyderma (Peck) Kreisel, (1962)
- Calvatia saccata (Vahl) Morgan 1890, accepted as Lycoperdon excipuliforme (Scop.) Pers., (1801)

Genus: Campanella Henn. 1895,

- Campanella buettneri Henn. [as büttneri], (1895)
- Campanella cucullata (Fr.) Lloyd 1919, accepted as Campanella junghuhnii (Mont.) Singer, (1945)

Genus: Campbellia Cooke & Massee 1890, accepted as Gyrodon Opat., (1836)

- Campbellia africana Cooke & Massee 1890, accepted as Gyrodon africanus (Cooke & Massee) Singer, (1951)

Genus: Candelaria A. Massal. 1852 (Lichens)

- Candelaria concolor (Dicks.) Arnold 1879
- Candelaria fibrosa (Fr.) Müll. Arg. 1887
- Candelaria stellata (Tuck.) Müll. Arg. 1887, accepted as Coccocarpia stellata Tuck., (1862)

Genus: Candelariella Müll. Arg. 1894(Lichens)

- Candelariella elaeophaea (Nyl.) Zahlbr. 1928
- Candelariella glaucolivescens (Nyl.) Zahlbr. 1928
- Candelariella vitellina (Hoffm.) Müll. Arg. 1894
- Candelariella vitellina f. athallina (Wedd.) Zahlbr. 1928

Genus: Candida Berkhout 1923(Yeasts)

- Candida albicans (C.P. Robin) Berkhout, (1923) recorded as Candida bethaliensis (Pijper) C.W. Dodge, 1935 and Candida triadis (Langeron & Talice) Langeron & Guerra 1938,
- Candida bethaliensis (Pijper) C.W. Dodge 1935 accepted as Candida albicans (C.P. Robin) Berkhout, (1923)
- Candida krusei Basgal. [sic] possibly (Castell.) Berkhout 1923, accepted as Issatchenkia orientalis Kudryavtsev, (1960)
- Candida triadis (Langeron & Talice) Langeron & Guerra 1938, accepted as Candida albicans (C.P. Robin) Berkhout, (1923)

Genus: Cantharellus Adans. ex Fr. 1821

- Cantharellus capensis Berk. 1844, accepted as Campanella capensis (Berk.) D.A. Reid, (1975)
- Cantharellus cinnabarinus (Schwein.) Schwein. 1832
- Cantharellus foliolum Kalchbr. 1881
- Cantharellus leucophaeus (Pers.) Nouel 1831, accepted as Faerberia carbonaria (Alb. & Schwein.) Pouzar, (1981)

Family: Capnodiaceae Höhn. ex Theiss. 1916

Genus: Capnodium Mont. 1849,

- Capnodium australe Mont. 1849
- Capnodium citricola McAlpine [as citricolum], (1896)
- Capnodium citri Berk. & Desm., in Berkeley, (1849)
- Capnodium fuligo Berk. & Desm. 1849, accepted as Microxyphiella fuligo (Berk. & Desm.) Speg., (1918)
- Capnodium salicinum Mont. 1849, accepted as Capnodium citri Berk. & Desm., (1849)

Genus: Castellania C.W. Dodge 1935, accepted as Candida Berkhout, (1923)

- Castellania balcanica (Castell. & Chalm.) C.W. Dodge 1935, accepted as Issatchenkia orientalis Kudryavtsev, (1960)
- Castellania linguae-pilosae (Lucet) C.W. Dodge 1935, accepted as Candida tropicalis (Castell.) Berkhout, (1923)
- Castellania pseudolondinensis (Castell. & Chalm.) C.W. Dodge 1935, accepted as Candida albicans (C.P. Robin) Berkhout, (1923)
- Castellania pseudotropicalis (Castell.) C.W. Dodge 1935, accepted as Kluyveromyces marxianus (E.C. Hansen) Van der Walt, (1971)
- Castellania sp.

Genus: Catacauma Theiss. & Syd. 1914, accepted as Phyllachora Nitschke ex Fuckel, (1870)

- Catacauma goyazense (Henn.) Theiss. & Syd. 1915, accepted as Phyllachora goyazensis Henn., (1895)
- Catacauma grammicum (Henn.) Theiss. & Syd. 1915, accepted as Phyllachora grammica Henn., (1907)
- Catacauma peglerae Doidge 1921, accepted as Phyllachora peglerae (Doidge) Doidge, (1942)
- Catacauma pterocarpi (Syd. & P. Syd.) Syd. 1915, accepted as Phyllachora pterocarpi Syd. & P. Syd., (1912)
- Catacauma punctum (Cooke) Theiss. & Syd. 1917 [as puncta] accepted as Phyllachora puncta (Cooke) Cooke, (1885)
- Catacauma schotiae Doidge 1922, [as schotii], accepted as Phyllachora schotiae (Doidge) Doidge, (1942)

Genus: Catalechia *

- Catalechia africana Müll.Arg.*

Genus: Catastoma Morgan 1892, accepted as Disciseda Czern. (1845)

- Catastoma anomalum (Cooke & Massee) Lloyd 1905, accepted as Disciseda anomala (Cooke & Massee) G. Cunn., (1927)
- Catastoma castaneum Lloyd*
- Catastoma circumscissum Morgan [sic] possibly Berk. & M.A. Curtis 1892
- Catastoma duthiei Lloyd*
- Catastoma juglandiforme Lloyd [sic], [as juglandiformis], possibly (Berk. ex Massee) Lohwag 1930, accepted as Disciseda juglandiformis (Berk. ex Massee) Hollós, (1902)
- Catastoma magnum Lloyd*
- Catastoma pedicellatum Morgan 1892, accepted as Disciseda pedicellata (Morgan) Hollós, (1902)
- Catastoma zeyheri Lloyd*

Genus: Catillaria A. Massal. 1852(Lichens)

- Catillaria chalybeia (Borrer) A. Massal. 1852
- Catillaria finckei Zahlbr. 1921
- Catillaria intermixta (Nyl.) Arnold 1870, accepted as Megalaria intermixta (Nyl.) Kalb, (2007)
- Catillaria intermixta f. cyanocentra Zahlbr.
- Catillaria lenticularis (Ach.) Th. Fr. 1874,
- Catillaria lenticularis f. chloropoliza (Nyl.) Boistel 1903, accepted as Catillaria chalybeia (Borrer) A. Massal., (1852)
- Catillaria lutea*
- Catillaria melampepla (Tuck.) Zahlbr. 1926
- Catillaria mortualis (Stizenb.) Zahlbr. 1926
- Catillaria nigroclavata Schuler. [sic], possibly (Nyl.) J. Steiner 1898
- Catillaria opacata (Stizenb.) Zahlbr. 1926
- Catillaria rhyparoleuca A. Massal. 1861
- Catillaria stellenboschiana Vain. 1926
- Catillaria stictella (Stirt.) Zahlbr. 1926
- Catillaria subfuscata (Nyl.) Zahlbr. 1926

== Ce ==
Genus: Celidium Tul. 1852, accepted as Arthonia (1806)

- Celidium stictarum (De Not.) Tul. 1852, accepted as Plectocarpon lichenum (Sommerf.) D. Hawksw.,(1984)

Genus: Cenangium Fr. 1818

- Cenangium pelidnum (Kalchbr. & Cooke) Sacc. 1889

Genus: Cephalosporiopsis Peyronel 1916,

- Cephalosporiopsis parasitica Hansf. 1943

Genus: Cephalosporium accepted as Acremonium Link (1809)

- Cephalosporium sacchari E.J. Butler & Hafiz Khan, (1913), accepted as Fusarium sacchari (E.J. Butler & Hafiz Khan) W. Gams, (1971)
- Cephalosporium sp.

Genus: Cephalothecium Corda 1838, accepted as Trichothecium Link, (1809)

- Cephalothecium roseum (Pers.) Corda (1838), accepted as Trichothecium roseum (Pers.) Link (1809)

Genus: Cephatelium *

- Cephatelium macowanianum Syd.*

Genus: Ceratium Alb. & Schwein. 1805, accepted as Ceratiomyxa J. Schröt., (1897) (Protozoa/slime moulds)

- Ceratium hydnoides (Jacq.) Alb. & Schwein. 1805
- Ceratium arbuscula Berk. & Broome 1873, accepted as Ceratiomyxa fruticulosa T. Macbr., (1899)
- Ceratium sphaeroideum Kalchbr. & Cooke (1880), accepted as Beniowskia sphaeroidea (Kalchbr. & Cooke) E.W. Mason, (1928)

Genus: Ceratosphaeria Niessl 1876

- Ceratosphaeria crinigera (Cooke) Sacc. 1883, accepted as Lentomitella crinigera (Cooke) Réblová, (2006)

Genus: Ceratostoma

- Ceratostoma cylindrica Kalchbr. & Cooke 1880, accepted as Peroneutypa cylindrica (Kalchbr. & Cooke.) Berl., (1902)

Genus: Ceratostomella Sacc. 1878,

- Ceratostomella paradoxa Dade 1928, accepted as Ceratocystis paradoxa (Dade) C. Moreau, (1952)
- Ceratostomella pilifera (Fr.) G. Winter 1885, accepted as Ceratocystis pilifera (Fr.) C. Moreau, (1952)

Genus: Cercoseptoria Petr. 1925, accepted as Pseudocercospora Speg., (1910)

- Cercoseptoria egenula Syd. 1935, accepted as Pseudocercospora egenula (Syd.) U. Braun & Crous, (2003)

Genus: Cercospora Fresen. ex Fuckel 1863,

- Cercospora apii Fresen. 1863,
- Cercospora apii var. pastinacae Sacc. 1886, accepted as Passalora pastinacae (Sacc.) U. Braun, (1992)
- Cercospora arachidicola Hori 1917,
- Cercospora argyrolobii Chupp & Doidge 1948, accepted as Pseudocercospora argyrolobii (Chupp & Doidge) Deighton, (1976)
- Cercospora bauhiniae Syd. & P. Syd. 1914, accepted as Pseudocercospora bauhiniae (Syd. & P. Syd.) Deighton, (1976)
- Cercospora beticola Sacc. 1876,
- Cercospora bolleana (Thüm.) Speg., (1879), accepted as Mycosphaerella bolleana B.B.Higgins, (1920)(?)
- Cercospora byliana Syd. 1924, accepted as Pseudocercospora byliana (Syd.) J.M. Yen, (1980)
- Cercospora caffra Syd. & P. Syd. 1914, accepted as Stigmina knoxdaviesii Crous & U. Braun, (1996)
- Cercospora canescens Ellis & G. Martin 1882
- Cercospora capensis (Thüm.) Sacc. 1886, accepted as Pleurophragmium capense (Thüm.) S. Hughes, (1958)
- Cercospora carotae Solh. [sic] possibly (Pass.) Kazn. & Siemaszko 1929
- Cercospora caryae Chupp & Doidge 1948
- Cercospora cassinopsidis G. Winter 1885
- Cercospora cichorii Davis 1919
- Cercospora circumscissa Sacc. (1878), accepted as Pruniphilomyces circumscissus (Sacc.) Crous & Bulgakov, (2020)
- Cercospora clerodendri I. Miyake 1913, accepted as Pseudocercospora clerodendri (I. Miyake) Deighton, (1976)
- Cercospora clutiae Kalchbr. & Cooke [as cluytiae],(1880) accepted as Pseudocercospora clutiae (Kalchbr. & Cooke) Deighton [as cluytiae], (1976)
- Cercospora coffeicola Berk. & Cooke 1881
- Cercospora columnaris Ellis & Everh. 1894, accepted as Pseudocercospora griseola (Sacc.) Crous & U. Braun, (2006)
- Cercospora commelinae Kalchbr. & Cooke [as commelynae], (1880)
- Cercospora corchori Sawada 1919
- Cercospora cruenta Sacc., (1880), accepted as Mycosphaerella cruenta (Sacc.) Latham, (1934)
- Cercospora curtisiae Chupp & Doidge 1948, accepted as Pseudocercospora curtisiae (Chupp & Doidge) Crous & U. Braun, (1996)
- Cercospora delicatissima Kalchbr. & Cooke 1880 accepted as Passalora delicatissima (Kalchbr. & Cooke) U. Braun & Crous,(2003)
- Cercospora demetrioniana G. Winter 1884 {as demetrionana]
- Cercospora dissotidis Chupp & Doidge 1948, accepted as Pseudocercospora dissotidis (Chupp & Doidge) Crous & U. Braun, (1996)
- Cercospora dovyalidis Chupp & Doidge 1948, accepted as Pseudocercospora dovyalidis (Chupp & Doidge) Deighton, (1976)
- Cercospora egenula (Syd.) Chupp & Doidge 1948, accepted as Pseudocercospora egenula (Syd.) U. Braun & Crous, (2003)
- Cercospora faureae Chupp & Doidge 1948, accepted as Podosporiella faureae (Chupp & Doidge) M.B. Ellis, (1976)
- Cercospora fici Heald & F.A. Wolf 1911 accepted as Pseudocercospora fici (Heald & F.A. Wolf) X.J. Liu & Y.L. Guo, (1991)
- Cercospora fukushiana (Matsuura) W. Yamam. 1934
- Cercospora fusca F.V. Rand 1914
- Cercospora fusimaculans G.F. Atk. 1892, accepted as Catenulocercospora fusimaculans (G.F. Atk.) C. Nakash., Videira & Crous, (2017)
- Cercospora gossypina Cooke (1883), accepted as Mycosphaerella gossypina (Cooke) Everh.
- Cercospora haemanthi Kalchbr. & Cooke 1880
- Cercospora grandissima Rangel 1915
- Cercospora guliana Sacc. 1913
- Cercospora halleriae Chupp & Doidge 1948, accepted as Pseudocercospora halleriae (Chupp & Doidge) Deighton, (1976)
- Cercospora Allesch. (1895) accepted as Clarohilum henningsii (Allesch.) Videira & Crous, (2017)
- Cercospora heteromalla Syd. 1924, accepted as Pseudocercospora heteromalla (Syd.) Deighton, (1987)
- Cercospora insulana Chupp [sic] possibly Sacc. 1915,
- Cercospora juglandis Kellerm. & Swingle 1889, accepted as Pseudocercospora juglandis (Kellerm. & Swingle) U. Braun & Crous, (2003)
- Cercospora jussiaeae G.F. Atk. 1892, [as jussieuae], accepted as Pseudocercospora jussiaeae (G.F. Atk.) Deighton, (1976)
- Cercospora kiggelariae Syd. 1924, accepted as Pseudocercospora kiggelariae (Syd.) Crous & U. Braun, (1994)
- Cercospora koepkei W. Krüger 1890, [as kopkei] accepted as Passalora koepkei (W. Krüger) U. Braun & Crous, (2003)
- Cercospora latimaculans Wakef. 1918
- Cercospora leoni Săvul. & Rayss 1935
- Cercospora leonotidis Cooke 1879, accepted as Passalora leonotidis (Cooke) U. Braun & Crous, (2003)
- Cercospora liebenbergii Syd. 1935, accepted as Cercostigmina liebenbergii (Syd.) Crous & U. Braun, (1996)
- Cercospora longipes E.J. Butler 1906,
- Cercospora malayensis F. Stevens & Solheim 1931, as mayalensis
- Cercospora melaena Syd. 1924, accepted as Pseudocercospora melaena (Syd.) Deighton, (1976)
- Cercospora melanochaeta Ellis & Everh. 1894, accepted as Passalora melanochaeta (Ellis & Everh.) U. Braun, (1999)
- Cercospora momordicae McRae 1929
- Cercospora musae Massee 1914
- Cercospora musae Zimm. 1902 accepted as Pseudocercospora musae (Zimm.) Deighton, (1976)
- Cercospora myrti Erikss. 1885,
- Cercospora myrticola Speg. 1886, accepted as Pseudocercospora myrticola (Speg.) Deighton, (1976)
- Cercospora nicotianae Ellis & Everh. 1893,
- Cercospora oblecta Syd. 1935, accepted as Pseudocercospora oblecta (Syd.) Crous & U. Braun, (2008)
- Cercospora occidentalis Cooke 1878, accepted as Passalora occidentalis (Cooke) U. Braun, (2000)
- Cercospora oliniae Verwoerd & Dippen. 1930, accepted as Pseudocercospora oliniae (Verwoerd & Dippen.) Crous & U. Braun, (1996)
- Cercospora omphacodes Ellis & Holw. 1885, accepted as Passalora omphacodes (Ellis & Holw.) Crous & U. Braun, (1996)
- Cercospora pachycarpi Chupp & Doidge 1948, accepted as Passalora pachycarpi (Chupp & Doidge) Crous & U. Braun, (1996)
- Cercospora pareirae Speg. 1910, accepted as Pseudocercospora pareirae (Speg.) Crous & U. Braun, (1996)
- Cercospora pastinacae (Sacc.) Peck 1912, accepted as Passalora pastinacae (Sacc.) U. Braun, (1992)
- Cercospora persicariae W. Yamam. 1934, accepted as Pseudocercospora persicariae (W. Yamam.) Deighton, (1976)
- Cercospora personata (Berk. & M.A. Curtis) Ellis, (1885), accepted as Nothopassalora personata (Berk. & M.A. Curtis) U. Braun, C. Nakash., Videira & Crous, (2017)
- Cercospora phaeocarpa Mitter 1937, accepted as Scolecostigmina phaeocarpa (Mitter) U. Braun, (1999)
- Cercospora pouzolziae Syd. 1935, accepted as Pseudocercospora pouzolziae (Syd.) Y.L. Guo & X.J. Liu, (1992)
- Cercospora pretoriensis Chupp & Doidge 1948
- Cercospora protearum Cooke 1883, accepted as Pseudocercospora protearum (Cooke) U. Braun & Crous, (2002)
- Cercospora protearum var. leucadendri Cooke 1883, accepted as Pseudocercospora leucadendri (Cooke) U. Braun & Crous, (2012)
- Cercospora protearum var. leucospermi Cooke 1883
- Cercospora punctiformis Sacc. & Roum. 1881
- Cercospora purpurea-cincta Nel.*
- Cercospora resedae Fuckel 1866,
- Cercospora rhoicissi Syd. & P. Syd. 1912, accepted as Pseudocercospora rhoicissi (Syd. & P. Syd.) Deighton, (1976)
- Cercospora riachueli Speg. 1880, accepted as Pseudocercospora riachueli (Speg.) Deighton, (1976)
- Cercospora richardiicola G.F. Atk. [as richardiaecola], (1892)
- Cercospora ricinella Sacc. & Berl. 1885,
- Cercospora rubrotincta Ellis & Everh. 1887,
- Cercospora scitula Syd. 1935, accepted as Pseudocercospora scitula (Syd.) Deighton, (1976)
- Cercospora sesami Zimm. 1904,
- Cercospora solani-melongenae Chupp 1948,
- Cercospora solani-melongenae Hori.*
- Cercospora sorghi Ellis & Everh. 1887,
- Cercospora sphaeroidea Speg. 1880, accepted as Phaeoisariopsis sphaeroidea (Speg.) L.G. Br. & Morgan-Jones, (1976)
- Cercospora stizolobii Syd. & P. Syd. 1913, accepted as Pseudocercospora stizolobii (Syd. & P. Syd.) Deighton, (1976)
- Cercospora transvaalensis Syd. 1935, accepted as Pseudocercospora transvaalensis (Syd.) Deighton, (1976)
- Cercospora tremae [sic] Chupp. possibly Cercospora trematis (F. Stevens & Solheim) Chupp, in Chardón & Toro, (1934), accepted as Passalora trematis (F. Stevens & Solheim) U. Braun & Crous, (2003)
- Cercospora vaginae W. Krüger, (1896),accepted as Passalora vaginae (W. Krüger) U. Braun & Crous, (2003)
- Cercospora violae Sacc. 1876,
- Cercospora viticola (Ces.) Sacc. [as viticolum], (1886), accepted as Pseudocercospora vitis (Lév.) Speg., (1910)
- Cercospora vitis Sacc. (1881), accepted as Pseudocercospora vitis (Lév.) Speg., (1910)
- Cercospora withaniae Syd. & P. Syd. 1912, accepted as Pseudocercospora withaniae (Syd. & P. Syd.) Deighton, (1976)
- Cercospora ziziphi Petch 1909, [as zizphyi], accepted as Pseudocercospora ziziphi (Petch) Crous & U. Braun [as zizyphi], (1996)
- Cercospora sp.

Genus: Cercosporella Sacc. 1880

- Cercosporella brassicae (Fautrey & Roum.) Höhn. 1924, accepted as Neopseudocercosporella capsellae (Ellis & Everh.) Videira & Crous, (2016)
- Cercosporella delicatissima (Kalchbr. & Cooke) Chupp 1948, accepted as Passalora delicatissima (Kalchbr. & Cooke) U. Braun & Crous, (2003)
- Cercosporella ekebergiae Syd. & P. Syd. 1914, accepted as Phaeophloeosporella ekebergiae (Syd. & P. Syd.) Crous & B. Sutton, (1997)
- Cercosporella gossypii Speg. 1886, accepted as Ramularia gossypii (Speg.) Cif., (1962)
- Cercosporella herpotrichoides Fron 1912, [asherpotrichioides], accepted as Oculimacula yallundae (Wallwork & Spooner) Crous & W. Gams, (2003)

Genus: Cercosporina Speg. 1910, accepted as Cercospora Fresen. ex Fuckel, (1863)

- Cercosporina ricinella (Sacc. & Berl.) Speg. 1910, accepted as Cercospora ricinella Sacc. & Berl., (1885)

Genus: Cerebella Ces. 1851, accepted as Epicoccum Link, (1816)

- Cerebella cynodontis Syd. & P. Syd. 1912
- Cerebella sp.

Genus: Cerotelium Arthur 1906

- Cerotelium fici (Castagne) Arthur 1917
- Cerotelium gossypii (Lagerh.) Arthur, (1917), accepted as Phakopsora desmium (Berk. & Broome) Cummins, (1945)

Genus: Cetraria Ach. 1803

- Cetraria aculeata (Schreb.) Fr. 1826

Genus: Ceuthospora Fr. 1825, accepted as Phacidium Fr., (1815)

- Ceuthospora foliicola (Lib.) Cooke 1879, accepted as Phacidium foliicola (Lib.) W.J. Li & K.D. Hyde, (2020)
- Ceuthospora oleae Kalchbr. & Cooke 1880

== Ch ==
Genus: Chaetodimerina Hansf. 1946 accepted as Rizalia Syd. & P. Syd., (1914)

- Chaetodimerina schiffnerulae Hansf. 1946, accepted as Rizalia schiffnerulae (Hansf.) E. Müll., (1962)

Genus: Chaetomella Fuckel 1870

- Chaetomella artemisiae Cooke 1882
- Chaetomella tritici Tehon & E.Y. Daniels 1925

Genus: Chaetominum [sic], probably Chaetomium Kunze 1817

- Chaetomium chartarum Ehrenb. 1818, [as Chaetominum chartarum] accepted as Chaetomium globosum Kunze, (1817)
- Chaetomium elatum Kunze 1818, as Chaetominum elatum
- Chaetomium funicola Cooke 1873, as Chaetominum funicolum accepted as Dichotomopilus funicola (Cooke) X.Wei Wang & Samson, (2016)
- Chaetomium globosum Kunze 1817, [as Chaetominum globosum]
- Chaetomium indicum Corda 1840, [as Chaetominum indicum] accepted as Dichotomopilus indicus (Corda) X.Wei Wang & Samson, (2016)

Genus: Chaetopeltopsis Theiss. 1913, accepted as Chaetothyrina Theiss., (1913)

- Chaetopeltopsis sp.

Genus: Chaetosphaeria Tul. & C. Tul. 1863

- Chaetosphaeria insectivora Hansf. 1946, accepted as Koordersiella insectivora (Hansf.) D. Hawksw. & O.E. Erikss., (1987)

Genus: Chaetostigmella Syd. & P. Syd. 1917, accepted as Dimerium (Sacc. & P. Syd.) McAlpine, (1903)

- Chaetostigmella asterinicola Doidge*
- Chaetostigmella capensis (Doidge) Toro 1934, accepted as Chaetothyrium capense (Doidge) Hansf., (1950)

Family: Chaetothyriaceae Hansf. ex M.E. Barr 1979

Genus: Chaetothyrium Speg. 1888

- Chaetothyrium capense (Doidge) Hansf. 1950,
- Chaetothyrium syzygii Hansf. 1946,
- Chaetothyrium transvaalensis v.d.Byl.*

Genus: Cheilymenia Boud. 1885,

- Cheilymenia coprinaria (Cooke) Boud. 1907
- Cheilymenia pulcherrima (P. Crouan & H. Crouan) Boud. 1907

Genus: Chiodecton Ach. 1814

- Chiodecton capense (A. Massal.) Zahlbr. 1923, accepted as Chiodecton colensoi (A. Massal.) Müll. Arg., (1894)
- Chiodecton direnium Nyl.*
- Chiodecton galactinum Zahlbr. 1932
- Chiodecton natalense Nyl. 1869
- Chiodecton sanguineum f. roseocinctum (Fr.) Vain. 1890, [as f. rosaceocinctum], accepted as Herpothallon roseocinctum (Fr.) Aptroot, Lücking & G. Thor, (2009)
- Chiodecton subnanum Vain. 1930
- Chiodecton vanderbylii Zahlbr. 1932
- Chiodecton venosum (Pers.) Zahlbr. 1905, accepted as Enterographa crassa (DC.) Fée, (1825)

Family: Chiodectonaceae Zahlbr. 1905

Genus: Chlamydopus Speg. 1898,

- Chlamydopus meyenianus (Klotzsch) Lloyd 1903,

Genus: Chloridium Link 1809, accepted as Chaetosphaeria Tul. & C. Tul.,(1863)

- Chloridium meliolae Hansf. 1946, accepted as Ramichloridium meliolae (Hansf.) de Hoog, (1977)

Genus: Chlorociboria Seaver 1936,

- Chlorociboria aeruginosa (Oeder) Seaver (1958)

Genus: Chlorodothis Clem. 1909, accepted as Tomasellia A. Massal., (1856)

- Chlorodothis lahmii (Müll. Arg.) Clem. 1909

Genus: Chlorosplenium Fr. 1849

- Chlorosplenium aeruginosum (Oeder) De Not. 1863, accepted as Chlorociboria aeruginosa (Oeder) Seaver, (1936)

Family: Choanephoraceae J. Schröt. 1897

Genus: Chondrioderma Rostaf. 1873, accepted as Diderma Pers., (1794) Protozoa

- Chondrioderma difforme (Pers.) Rostaf. 1873, accepted as Didymium difforme (Pers.) Gray, (1821)
- Chondrioderma subdictyospermum Rostaf. 1876 as subdictyosperum; Protozoa

Genus: Chondromyces Berk. & M.A. Curtis 1874

- Chondromyces aurantiacus Thaxter.*

Genus: Chroolepus C. Agardh 1824, accepted as Cystocoleus Thwaites, (1849)

- Chroolepus afrum Massal. [sic] possibly Müll. Arg. 1861

Genus: Chrysomyces Theiss. & Syd. 1917, accepted as Perisporiopsis Henn., (1904)

- Chrysomyces brachystegiae (Henn.) Theiss. & Syd. 1917, [as brachtystegiae], accepted as Perisporiopsis brachystegiae (Henn.) Arx, (1962)

Family: Chrysothricaceae*

Order Chytridiales Cohn 1879

== Ci ==
Genus: Cicinnobella Henn. 1904, accepted as Perisporiopsis Henn., (1904)

- Cicinnobella sp.

Genus: Cicinnobolus Ehrenb. 1853, accepted as Ampelomyces Ces. ex Schltdl., (1852)

- Cicinnobolus cesatii de Bary, 1870, accepted as Ampelomyces quisqualis Ces., 1852[

Genus: Cienkowskia Rostaf. 1873, accepted as Willkommlangea Kuntze, (1891)

- Cienkowskia reticulata (Alb. & Schwein.) Rostaf. 1875, accepted as Willkommlangea reticulata (Alb. & Schwein.) Kuntze, (1891)

Genus: Ciliciopodium Corda 1831

- Ciliciopodium caespitosum (Welw. & Curr.) Sacc. 1886

Genus: Cintractia Cornu 1883

- Cintractia axicola (Berk.) Cornu 1883
- Cintractia capensis (Reess) Cif. 1931, accepted as Bauerago capensis (Reess) Vánky, (1999)
- Cintractia caricicola Henn. 1895
- Cintractia crus-galli (Tracy & Earle) Magnus 1896, accepted as Ustilago crus-galli Tracy & Earle, (1895)
- Cintractia leucoderma (Berk.) Henn. 1895, accepted as Leucocintractia leucoderma (Berk.) M. Piepenbr., (2000)
- Cintractia melinidis Zundel [as melinis], (1938)
- Cintractia piluliformis (Berk.) Henn. 1898, accepted as Heterotolyposporium piluliforme (Berk.) Vánky, (1997)
- Cintractia sorghi-vulgaris (Tul. & C.Tul.) G.P.Clinton (1897), accepted as Sporisorium sorghi Ehrenb. ex Link (1825)
- Cintractia togoensis Henn. 1905, accepted as Cintractia limitata G.P. Clinton, (1904)

Genus: Circinella Tiegh. & G. Le Monn. 1873

- Circinella sydowii Lendn. 1913, accepted as Circinella muscae (Sorokīn) Berl. & De Toni, (1888)

== Cl ==
Genus: Cladia Nyl. 1870,

- Cladia aggregata (Sw.) Nyl. 1870

Family: Cladochytriaceae J. Schröt. 1897

Genus: Cladoderris Pers. ex Berk. 1842, accepted as Cymatoderma Jungh., (1840)

- Cladoderris australica Berk. 1888, accepted as Cymatoderma elegans Jungh., (1840)
- Cladoderris elegans (Jungh.) Fr., (1849) accepted as Cymatoderma elegans Jungh. 1840
- Cladoderris funalis Henn. 1905, accepted as Pterygellus funalis (Henn.) D.A. Reid, (1976)
- Cladoderris infundibuliformis (Klotzsch) Fr. 1845, accepted as Cymatoderma infundibuliforme (Klotzsch) Boidin, (1959)
- Cladoderris spongiosa Fr. 1845, accepted as Cymatoderma elegans Jungh., (1840)
- Cladoderris spongiosa var. subsessilis Fr. 1849, accepted as Cymatoderma elegans Jungh., (1840)
- Cladoderris thwaitesii Berk. & Broome 1873, accepted as Stereopsis radicans (Berk.) D.A. Reid, (1965)

Family: Cladoniaceae Zenker 1827,

Genus: Cladonia P. Browne 1756,

- Cladonia aggregata Ach. [sic] possibly (Sw.) Spreng. 1827, accepted as Cladia aggregata (Sw.) Nyl., (167) (1870)
- Cladonia bacillaris Nyl. [sic] possibly (Ach.) Genth 1835
- Cladonia bacillaris f. pityropoda Nyl. ex Cromb. 1894, accepted as Cladonia macilenta Hoffm., [1795]
- Cladonia caespiticia Floerke. [sic] possibly (Pers.) P. Gaertn., B. Mey & Scherb. 1802
- Cladonia centrophora Müll. Arg. 1887
- Cladonia chlorophaea (Flörke ex Sommerf.) Spreng. 1827
- Cladonia chordalis Ach. [sic] possibly (Flörke) Nyl.
- Cladonia didyma var. muscigena (Eschw.) Vain. 1887
- Cladonia didyma var. muscigena f. subulata Sandst.*
- Cladonia fimbriata (L.) Fr. 1831
- Cladonia fimbriata f. abortiva (Flörke) Harm. 1896
- Cladonia fimbriata var. balfourii (Cromb.) Vain. 1894, accepted as Cladonia subradiata (Vain.) Sandst., (1922)
- Cladonia fimbriata var. chlorophaeoides (Vain.) C.W. Dodge 1950;
- Cladonia fimbriata var. chondroidea Vain. 1894
- Cladonia fimbriata var. chondroidea f. balfourii*
- Cladonia fimbriata var. chondroidea f. chlorophaeoides Wain.*
- Cladonia fimbriata var. chondroidea f. subradiata Wain.*
- Cladonia fimbriata var. coniocraea Wain. [sic] possibly (Flörke) Nyl. 1858, accepted as Cladonia coniocraea (Flörke) Spreng., (1827)
- Cladonia fimbriata var. fibula Stizenb. [sic] possibly (Hoffm.) Nyl. 1861
- Cladonia fimbriata var. nemoxyna (Ach.) Coem. ex Vain. 1894, accepted as Cladonia rei Schaer., (1823)
- Cladonia fimbriata var. nemoxyna f. fibula Wain.*
- Cladonia fimbriata var. ochrochlora Wain. [sic] possibly (Flörke) Schaer. 1833, accepted as Cladonia ochrochlora Flörke, (1827)
- Cladonia fimbriata var. radiata Coem. [sic] possibly (Schreb.) Cromb. 1831, accepted as Cladonia subulata (L.) Weber ex F.H. Wigg., (1780)
- Cladonia fimbriata var. radiata f. nemoxyna Flotow.*
- Cladonia fimbriata var. simplex (Weiss) Flot. ex Vain. 1894
- Cladonia fimbriata var. subcornuta Nyl. ex Arnold 1875, accepted as Cladonia subulata (L.) Weber ex F.H. Wigg., (1780)
- Cladonia fimbriata var. subradiata Vain. 1894,
- Cladonia fimbriata var. subulata (L.) Vain. 1894, accepted as Cladonia subulata (L.) Weber ex F.H. Wigg., (1780)
- Cladonia fimbriata var. subulata f. abortiva Harm.*
- Cladonia fimbriata var. subulata f. chordalis Ach.*
- Cladonia fimbriata var. subulata f. subcornuta Zahlbr.*
- Cladonia fimbriata var. tubaeformis Ach. [sic] possibly (Hoffm.) Fr. 1831
- Cladonia flabelliformis f. tenella (Müll. Arg.) Zahlbr. 1926
- Cladonia fiabelliformis var. tenella Müll. Arg. 1891
- Cladonia floerkeana Sommerf. [sic] possibly (Fr.) Flörke 1828
- Cladonia furcata Sehrad. [sic] possibly (Huds.) Baumg. 1790
- Cladonia gorgonina var. subrangiferina (Nyl.) Vain. 1887, accepted as Cladia aggregata (Sw.) Nyl., (1870)
- Cladonia macilenta Hoffm. 1796
- Cladonia macilenta var. corticata (Vain.) Doidge 1950
- Cladonia multiformis Merrill f. subascypha Evans.*
- Cladonia neglecta (Flörke) Spreng. 1827, accepted as Cladonia pyxidata (L.) Hoffm., (1796) [1795]
- Cladonia ochrochlora Flörke 1827
- Cladonia pityrea (Flörke) Fr. 1826, accepted as Cladonia ramulosa (With.) J.R. Laundon, (1984)
- Cladonia pityrea f. scyphifera (Delise) Vain. 1894, accepted as Cladonia ramulosa (With.) J.R. Laundon, (1984)
- Cladonia pityrea var. subareolata Vain. 1894
- Cladonia pityrea var. zwackii Vain. 1894 f. scyphifera Vain.*
- Cladonia pungens Floerke [sic] possibly (Ach.) Gray 1821, accepted as Cladonia pertricosa Kremp., (1881) [1880]
- Cladonia pungens f. foliolosa Nyi. [sic] possibly (Flörke) Leight. 1879
- Cladonia pycnoclada (Pers.) Nyl. 1867,
- Cladonia pycnoclada f. exalbescens (Vain.) Petr. 1948, accepted as Cladonia confusa R. Sant., (1942)
- Cladonia pyxidata Fr. [sic] possibly (L.) Hoffm. 1796
- Cladonia pyxidata f. staphylea Nyl. [sic] possibly (Ach.) Harm. 1896
- Cladonia pyxidata var. chlorophaea (Flörke ex Sommerf.) Flörke 1894, accepted as Cladonia chlorophaea (Flörke ex Sommerf.) Spreng., (1827)
- Cladonia pyxidate var. chlorophaea f. staphylea Harm.*
- Cladonia pyxidata var. pocillum (Ach.) Flot. ex Vain. 1894, accepted as Cladonia pocillum (Ach.) O.J. Rich., (1877)
- Cladonia rangiferina (L.) Weber 1780,
- Cladonia rangiformis var. foliosa Flörke ex Vain. 1887
- Cladonia rangiformis var. pungens (Ach.) Vain. 1887, accepted as Cladonia pertricosa Kremp., (1881) [1880]
- Cladonia squamosa Hoffm. 1796
- Cladonia subcornuta Stizenb. [sic] possibly (Nyl. ex Arnold) Cromb. 1880, accepted as Cladonia subulata (L.) Weber ex F.H. Wigg., (1780)
- Cladonia sylvatica (L.) Hoffm. 1796, accepted as Cladonia portentosa (Dufour) Coem., (1865)
- Cladonia verticillata (Hoffm.) Ach. 1799, accepted as Cladonia cervicornis (Ach.) Flot., (1849)
- Cladonia sp.

Genus: Cladosporium Link 1816

- Cladosporium aphidis Thüm. 1877
- Cladosporium asteromatoides Sacc. 1885
- Cladosporium baccae Verwoerd & Dippen. 1930
- Cladosporium berkheyae Syd. & P. Syd. 1914, accepted as Passalora berkheyae (Syd. & P. Syd.) U. Braun & Crous, (2003)
- Cladosporium carpophilum Thüm. (1877), accepted as Venturia carpophila E.E.Fisher (1961)
- Cladosporium citri possibly Massee 1899
- Cladosporium cucumerinum Ellis & Arthur 1889
- Cladosporium elatum (Harz) Nannf. 1934
- Cladosporium fulvum Cooke 1883 accepted as Fulvia fulva (Cooke) Cif., (1954)
- Cladosporium herbarum (Pers.) Link 1816
- Cladosporium laxum Kalchbr. & Cooke 1880, accepted as Passalora laxa (Kalchbr. & Cooke) U. Braun & Crous, (2003)
- Cladosporium macrocarpum Preuss 1848
- Cladosporium melanophloei Thüm. 1877
- Cladosporium pisicola W.C. Snyder [as pisicolum], (1934)
- Cladosporium tenuissimum Cooke 1878
- Cladosporium vignae Rac. [sic] possibly M.W. Gardner 1925,
- Cladosporium zeae Peck 1894
- Cladosporium sp.

Genus: Clasterosporium Schwein. 1832

- Clasterosporium carpophilum (Lév.) Aderh. (1901), accepted as Stigmina carpophila (Lév.) M.B. Ellis, (1959)
- Clasterosporium celastri (Thüm.) Sacc. 1886
- Clasterosporium clavatum (Lév.) Sacc. 1886
- Clasterosporium densum Syd. & P. Syd. 1912 accepted as Annellophorella densa (Syd. & P. Syd.) Subram., (1962)

Family: Clathraceae Chevall. 1826

Genus: Clathroporina Müll. Arg. 1882

- Clathroporina locuples (Stizenb.) Zahlbr. 1922

Genus: Clathrus P. Micheli ex L. 1753, (formerly Clathrella)

- Clathrus angolensis (Welw. & Curr.) E. Fisch. 1886, accepted as Blumenavia angolensis (Welw. & Curr.) Dring, (1980)
- Clathrus baumii Henn. 1903
- Clathrus camerunensis Henn. 1890
- Clathrus cancellatus Tourn. ex Fr. 1823, accepted as Clathrus ruber P. Micheli ex Pers., (1801)
- Clathrus cibarius (Tul. & C. Tul.) E. Fisch. 1886, accepted as Ileodictyon cibarium Tul. & C. Tul. [as 'cibaricum'], (1844)
- Clathrus gracilis (Berk.) Schltdl. 1862, accepted as Ileodictyon gracile Berk., (1845)
- Clathrus pseudocancellatus (E. Fisch.) Lloyd 1909, [as pseudocancellata]
- Clathrus sp.

Genus: Claudopus Gillet 1876, accepted as Entoloma (Fr.) P. Kumm., (1871)

- Claudopus proteus Kalchbr. [sic] possibly Sacc. 1887, accepted as Melanotus proteus (Sacc.) Singer, (1946)
- Claudopus variabilis (Pers.) Gillet 1876, accepted as Crepidotus variabilis (Pers.) P. Kumm., (1871)

Family: Clavariaceae Chevall. 1826

Genus: Clavaria P. Micheli 1729

- Clavaria abietina Pers. 1794, accepted as Phaeoclavulina abietina (Pers.) Giachini, (2011)
- Clavaria byssiseda Pers. 1796
- Clavaria capensis Thunb. 1800
- Clavaria cinerea Bull. 1788, accepted as Clavulina cinerea (Bull.) J. Schröt., (1888)
- Clavaria cladoniae Kalchbr. 1882, accepted as Ramaria cladoniae (Kalchbr.) D.A. Reid, (1974)
- Clavaria contorta Holmsk. 1790, accepted as Typhula contorta (Holmsk.) Olariaga, (2013)
- Clavaria corniculata Schaeff. 1774, accepted as Clavulinopsis corniculata (Schaeff.) Corner, (1950)
- Clavaria corniculata var. pratensis (Pers.) Cotton & Wakefield 1919, accepted as Clavulinopsis corniculata (Schaeff.) Corner, (1950)
- Clavaria cristata (Holmsk.) Pers. 1801, accepted as Clavulina coralloides (L.) J. Schröt., (1888)
- Clavaria cyanocephala Berk. & M.A. Curtis 1868, accepted as Phaeoclavulina cyanocephala (Berk. & M.A. Curtis) Giachini, (2011)
- Clavaria dealbata Berk. 1856, accepted as Ramariopsis dealbata (Berk.) R.H. Petersen, (1984)
- Clavaria dichotoma Kalchbr. 1882, accepted as Ramaria saccardoi (P. Syd.) Corner, (1950)
- Clavaria durbana Van der Byl 1932, accepted as Scytinopogon pallescens (Bres.) Singer, (1945)
- Clavaria fastigiata L. 1753, accepted as Clavulinopsis corniculata (Schaeff.) Corner, (1950)
- Clavaria flaccida Fr. 1821, accepted as Phaeoclavulina flaccida (Fr.) Giachini, (2011)
- Clavaria furcellata Fr. 1830
- Clavaria inaequalis O.F. Müll. 1780
- Clavaria kalchbrenneri Sacc. 1888
- Clavaria kunzei Fr. (1821), accepted as Ramariopsis kunzei (Fr.) Corner (1950)
- Clavaria laeticolor Berk. & M.A. Curtis 1868, accepted as Clavulinopsis laeticolor (Berk. & M.A. Curtis) R.H. Petersen, (1965)
- Clavaria ligula Schaeff. 1774, accepted as Clavariadelphus ligula (Schaeff.) Donk, (1933)
- Clavaria lorithamnus Berk. 1872, accepted as Ramaria lorithamnus (Berk.) R.H. Petersen,
- Clavaria miniata Berk. (1843), accepted as Clavulinopsis sulcata Overeem (1923)
- Clavaria muscoides L. 1753
- Clavaria persimilis Cotton 1910, accepted as Clavulinopsis laeticolor (Berk. & M.A. Curtis) R.H. Petersen, (1965)
- Clavaria pistillaris L. 1753, accepted as Clavariadelphus pistillaris (L.) Donk, (1933)
- Clavaria pulchra Peck 1876, accepted as Clavulinopsis laeticolor (Berk. & M.A. Curtis) R.H. Petersen, (1965)
- Clavaria semivestita Berk. & Broome 1873, accepted as Clavulinopsis semivestita (Berk. & Broome) Corner, (1950)
- Clavaria setacea Kalchbr. 1882, accepted as Pterula setacea (Kalchbr.) Corner, (1950)
- Clavaria stricta Pers. 1795, accepted as Ramaria stricta (Pers.) Quél., (1888)
- Clavaria vermicularis Fr. [sic], possibly Sw. (1811), accepted as Clavaria fragilis Holmsk. (1790)
- Clavaria zippelii Lév. 1844, accepted as Phaeoclavulina zippelii (Lév.) Overeem, (1923)

Genus: Claviceps Tul. 1853

- Claviceps digitariae Hansf. 1941
- Claviceps microcephala (Wallr.) Tul. 1853, accepted as Claviceps purpurea (Fr.) Tul., (1853)
- Claviceps paspali F. Stevens & J.G. Hall 1910
- Claviceps purpurea (Fr.) Tul. 1853
- Claviceps sp.

Genus: Clitocybe (Fr.) Staude 1857,

- Clitocybe amara Quel. [sic] (Alb. & Schwein.) P. Kumm. 1871, accepted as Lepista amara (Alb. & Schwein.) Maire, (1930)
- Clitocybe expallens Quel. [sic] (Pers.) P. Kumm. 1871, accepted as Pseudoclitocybe expallens (Pers.) M.M. Moser, (1967)
- Clitocybe fragrans Quel. [sic] (With.) P. Kumm. 1871
- Clitocybe gentianea Quél. 1873, accepted as Leucopaxillus gentianeus (Quél.) Kotl. (1966)
- Clitocybe infundibuliformis var. membranacea Gill. [sic] (Vahl) Massee 1893, accepted as Infundibulicybe gibba (Pers.) Harmaja, (2003)
- Clitocybe membranacea Fr. [sic] (Vahl) Sacc. 1887, accepted as Infundibulicybe gibba (Pers.) Harmaja, (2003)
- Clitocybe sinopica Gill. [sic] (Fr.) P. Kumm. 1871, accepted as Bonomyces sinopicus (Fr.) Vizzini, (2014)
- Clitocybe splendens (Pers.) Gillet 1874, accepted as Paralepista splendens (Pers.) Vizzini, (2012)
- Clitocybe trulliformis (Fr.) P. Karst. [as trullaeformis] accepted as Infundibulicybe trulliformis (Fr.) Gminder 2016
- Clitocybe ziziphina (Viv.) Sacc. (1887), [as zizyphina].

Genus: Clitopilus (Fr. ex Rabenh.) P. Kumm. 1871

- Clitopilus prunulus Quel. [sic] (Scop.) P. Kumm. 1871

Genus: Clypeolella Höhn. 1910, accepted as Sarcinella Sacc. (1880)

- Clypeolella psychotriae (Doidge) Doidge 1942, accepted as Schiffnerula psychotriae (Doidge) S. Hughes, (1987)
- Clypeolella rhamnicola (Doidge) Doidge 1942, accepted as Schiffnerula rhamnicola (Doidge) S. Hughes, (1987)

Genus: Clypeosphaeria Fuckel 1870

- Clypeosphaeria natalensis Doidge 1922,

== Co ==
Genus: Cochliobolus Drechsler 1934, accepted as Bipolaris Shoemaker, (1959)

- Cochliobolus stenospilus T. Matsumoto & W. Yamam. 1936, [as Cochliobilus stenospilus] accepted as Bipolaris stenospila (Drechsler ex Faris) Shoemaker, (2018)

Family: Coccidioidaceae Cif. 1932

Genus: Coccocarpia Pers. 1827

- Coccocarpia pellita var. parmelioides (Hook.) Müll. Arg. 1887, accepted as Coccocarpia erythroxyli (Spreng.) Swinscow & Krog (1976)

Genus: Coccochora Höhn. 1909,

- Coccochora lebeckiae Verwoerd & Dippen. 1930, accepted as Coleroa lebeckiae (Verwoerd & Dippen.) Arx, (1962)

Genus: Cocconia Sacc. 1889

- Cocconia capensis Doidge 1921, accepted as Cycloschizon capense (Doidge) Arx, (1962)
- Cocconia concentrica (Syd. & P. Syd.) Syd. 1915
- Cocconia porrigo (Cooke) Sacc. 1889, accepted as Cycloschizon porrigo (Cooke) Arx, (1962)

Family: Coenogoniaceae Stizenb. 1862

=== temp ===
Genus: Coenogonium

- Coenogonium afrum Massal.
- Coenogonium interplexum Nyl.

Genus: Coleophoma

- Coleophoma Oleae Petr. & Syd.

Genus: Coleosporium

- Coleosporium clematidis Bare.
- Coleosporium detergibile Thuem.
- Coleosporium hedyotidis Kalchbr. & Cooke
- Coleosporium ipomoeae Burr.
- Coleosporium ochraceum Bon.

Family: Collemaceae

Genus: Collema

- Collema aggregatum Rohl.
- Collema bullatum Ach.
- Collema byrsinum Ach.
- Collema caespitosum Tayl.
- Collema crispum Wigg.
- Collema fuliginellum Nyl.
- Collema furvum DC.
- Collema lanatum Pers.
- Collema nigrescens DC.
- Collema pulposum Ach. var. tenax Nyl.
- Collema redundans Nyl.
- Collema satuminum DC.
- Collema tenax Ach.
- Collema thysaneum Ach.
- Collema tremelloides Ach.

Genus: Colletotrichum

- Colletotrichum agaves Cav.
- Colletotrichum anonicola Speg.
- Colletotrichum antirrhini Stew.
- Colletotrichum atramentarium Taubenh.
- Colletotrichum brachytrichum Del.
- Colletotrichum cameiliae Mass.
- Colletotrichum carica Stev. & Hall.
- Colletotrichum cereale Manns.
- Colletotrichum circinans Vogl.
- Colletotrichum coffeanum Noack.
- Colletotrichum dematium Grove.
- Colletotrichum falcatum Went.
- Colletotrichum gloeosporioides Penz.
- Colletotrichum glycines Hori.
- Colletotrichum gossypii Edgert.
- Colletotrichum graminicolum Wilson.
- Colletotrichum kickxiae Verw. & du Pless.
- Colletotrichum lagenarium Ell. & Halst.
- Colletotrichum lindemuthianum Shear
- Colletotrichum malvarum Braun & Casp.
- Colletotrichum nigrum Ell. & Halst.
- Colletotrichum omnivorum Halst.
- Colletotrichum orchidearum Allesch.
- Colletotrichum papayae Syd.
- Colletotrichum phomoides Chester.
- Colletotrichum pterocelastri Wakef.
- Colletotrichum rhodocyclum Petrak.
- Colletotrichum trifolii Bain & Essary.
- Colletotrichum sp.

Genus: Colonnaria

- Colonnaria columnata Ed.Fisch.

Genus: Collybia

- Collybia acervata Gill.
- Collybia albuminosa Petch.
- Collybia alveolata Sacc.
- Collybia butyracea Quel.
- Collybia chortophila Sacc.
- Collybia confluens Quel.
- Collybia dryophila Quel.
- Collybia dryophila var. oedipus Quel.
- Collybia extuberans Quel.
- Collybia fusipes Quel. var. contorta Gill. & Lucand.
- Collybia homotricha Sacc.
- Collybia macilenta Gill.
- Collybia melinosarca Sacc.
- Collybia radicata Quel.
- Collybia radicata var. brachypus Sacc.
- Collybia ratticauda Fayod.
- Collybia stipulincola Kalchbr.
- Collybia stridula Quel.
- Collybia velutipes Quel.
- Collybia sp.

Genus: Comatricha

- Comatricha irregularis Peck.
- Comatricha longa Peck.
- Comatricha nigra Schroet.
- Comatricha nigra var. alta Lister.
- Comatricha tenerrima G. Lister.
- Comatricha typhoides Rost.

Genus: Combea

- Combea mollusca Ach.
- Combea pruinosa de Not.

Genus: Coniocybe

- Coniocybe owanii Korb.

Genus: Coniodictyum

- Coniodictyum evansii Höhn.

Genus: Coniophora

- Coniophora atrocinerea Karst.
- Coniophora betulae Karst.
- Coniophora cerebella Pers.
- Coniophora papillosa Talbot.
- Coniophora pulverulenta Mass.
- Coniophora puteana Karst.
- Coniophora olivacea Karst.

Genus: Coniothorium

- Coniosporium schiraianum Bubak.

Genus: Coniothecium

- Coniothecium chomatosporum Corda.
- Coniothecium citri McAlp.
- Coniothecium macowanii Sace.
- Coniothecium punctiforme Wint.
- Coniothecium scabrum McAlp.
- Coniothecium sp.

Genus: Coniothyrina

- Coniothyrina agaves Petrak & Syd.

Genus: Coniothyrium

- Coniothyrium fuckelii Sacc.
- Coniothyrium insigne Syd.
- Coniothyrium occultum Syd.
- Coniothyrium palmicolum Starb.
- Coniothyrium rafniicola Petrak.

Genus: Conotrema

- Conotrema volvarioides Müll.Arg.

Genus: Cookeina

- Cookeina colensoi Seaver

Genus: Coprinus

- Coprinus atramentarius Fr. (= Coprinopsis atramentaria)
- Coprinus cheesmani Th.Gibbs
- Coprinus cinereus S.F.Gray (= Coprinopsis cinerea)
- Coprinus comatus S.F.Gray
- Coprinus comatus var. ovatus Quel.
- Coprinus curtus Kalchbr.
- Coprinus digitalis Fr.
- Coprinus ephemerus Fr.
- Coprinus flocculosus Fr.
- Coprinus macrorhizus Rea.
- Coprinus micaceus Fr. (= Coprinellus micaceus)
- Coprinus micaceus var. truncorum Quel.
- Coprinus niveus Fr. Schaeff. ex Fr. (= Coprinellus niveus)
- Coprinus plicatilis Fr.
- Coprinus punctatus Kalchbr. & Cooke
- Coprinus radiatus S.F.Gray (= Coprinopsis radiata)
- Coprinus stercorarius Fr.
- Coprinus truncorum Fr.
- Coprinus sp.

Genus: Cordana

- Cordana musae Höhn.
- Cordana pauciseptata Preuss.
- Cordana sp.

Genus: Cordyceps

- Cordyceps flabella Berk. & Curt.
- Cordyceps velutipes Mass.
- Cordyceps sp.

Genus: Cornicularia

- Cornicularia tenuissima Zahlbr.

Genus: Corollospora

- Corollospora maritima Werd.

Genus: Corticium

- Corticium abeuns Burt.
- Corticium argillaceum Höhn. & Litsch
- Corticium armeniacum Sacc. (= Cerocorticium molle)
- Corticium atrocinereum Kalchbr.
- Corticium bombycinum Bres.
- Corticium caeruleum Fr.
- Corticium calceum Fr. emend. Romell & Burt
- Corticium calceum Fr.
- Corticium calceum var. lacteum Fr.
- Corticium ceraceum Berk. & Rav. (= Cerocorticium molle)
- Corticium cinereum Fr. (= Peniophora cinerea)
- Corticium confluens Fr.
- Corticium dregeanum Berk.
- Corticium gloeosporum Talbot
- Corticium lacteum Fr. (= Phanerochaete tuberculata)
- Corticium laetum Bres.
- Corticium luteocystidiatum Talbot
- Corticium nudum Fr.
- Corticium pelliculare Karst.
- Corticium portentosum Berk. & Curt.
- Corticium pulverulentum Cooke
- Corticium salmonicolor Berk. & Br. (= Phanerochaete salmonicolor)
- Corticium scutellare Berk. & Curt.
- Corticium solani Bourd. & Galz
- Corticium tumulosum Talbot
- Corticium vagum Berk. & Curt.
- Corticium vagum var. solani Burt.
- Corticium sp.

Genus: Cortinarius

- Cortinarius argutus Fr.
- Cortinarius camurus Fr.
- Cortinarius castaneus Fr.
- Cortinarius fusco-tinctus Rea.
- Cortinarius lepidopus Cooke.
- Cortinarius multiformis Fr.

Family: Coryneliaceae

Genus: Corynelia

- Corynelia carpophila Syd.
- Corynelia clavata Sacc.
- Corynelia clavata f. fructicola Rehm.
- Corynelia fructicola Höhn.
- Corynelia tripos Cooke
- Corynelia uberata Fr. ex Ach.

Genus: Coryneliospora

- Coryneliospora fructicola Fitz.

Genus: Coryneum

- Coryneum beyerinckii Oud. (Stigmina carpophila)
- Coryneum cocoes P.Henn.
- Coryneum disciforme Kunze & Schum.
- Coryneum dovyalidis v.d.Byl.
- Coryneum kunzei Corda.

== Cr ==
Genus: Craterellus

- Craterellus comucopioides Pers.

Genus: Craterium

- Craterium aureum Rost.
- Craterium eonfusum Mass.
- Craterium leucocephalum Ditm. var. scyphoides Lister.
- Craterium minutum Fr.

Genus: Crepidotus

- Crepidotus applanatus Karst.
- Crepidotus episphaeria Sacc.
- Crepidotus inandae Sacc.
- Crepidotus mollis Quel.
- Crepidotus pogonatus Sacc.
- Crepidotus scalaris Karst, var. lobulatus Sacc.

Genus: Cribraria

- Cribraria argillacea Pers.
- Cribraria intricata Schrad.
- Cribraria tenella Schrad.

Genus: Crocynia

- Crocynia membranacea Zahlbr.

Genus: Cronartium

- Cronartium bresadoleanum P.Henn.
- Cronartium bresadoleanum var. eucleae P.Henn.
- Cronartium gilgianum P.Henn.
- Cronartium zizyphi Syd. & Butl.

Genus: Crossopsora

- Crossopsora gilgiana Syd.

Genus: Crucibulum

- Crucibulum vulgare Tul.

Genus: Cryptococcus

- Cryptococcus histolycus Stoddard & Cutler.
- Cryptococcus linguae-pilosa Castellani & Chalmers.
- Cryptococcus sp.

Genus: Cryptodidymosphaeria

- Cryptodidymosphaeria clandestina Syd.

Genus: Cryptogene

- Cryptogene parodiellae Syd.

Genus: Cryptogenella

- Cryptogenella parodiellae Syd.

Genus: Cryptomyces

- Cryptomyces eugeniacearum Sacc.
- Cryptomyces melianthi Sacc.
- Cryptomyces myricae Sacc.

Genus: Cryptosporella

- Cryptosporella umbrina Wehm.

Genus: Cryptosporium

- Cryptosporium fatale Kalchbr.

Genus: Cryptostictus

- Cryptostictis dryopteris Verw. & du Pless.

Genus: Cryptothecia

- Cryptothecia subnidulans Stirt.

Family: Cryptotheciaceae

== Cu ==
Genus: Cunninghamiella

- Cunninghamella sp.

Genus: Curvularia

- Curvularia intermedia Boedijn.
- Curvularia lunata Boedijn. (= Cochliobolus lunatus)
- Curvularia maculans Boedijn.
- Curvularia spicifera Boedijn. (= Cochliobolus spicifer)
- Curvularia sp.

== Cy ==
Genus: Cyanisticta

- Cyanisticta crocata Gyeln.
- Cyanisticta crocata var. isidiata Gyeln.
- Cyanisticta gilva Gyeln.
- Cyanisticta gilva var. angustilobata Gyeln.
- Cyanisticta gilva var. lanata Gyeln.
- Cyanisticta gilva var. pseudogilva Gyeln.
- Cyanisticta subcrocata Gyeln.
- Cyanisticta thouarsii Gyeln.

Genus: Cyathus

- Cyathus berkeleyanus Lloyd
- Cyathus dasypus Nees
- Cyathus hookeri Berk.
- Cyathus laevis Thunb.
- Cyathus microsporus Tul.
- Cyathus minutosporus Lloyd
- Cyathus montagnei Tul.
- Cyathus olla Pers.
- Cyathus pallidus Berk. & Curt.
- Cyathus plicatulus Poepp.
- Cyathus poeppigii Tul.
- Cyathus rufipes Ellis.
- Cyathus stercoreus de Toni.
- Cyathus stercoreus f. leseurii Tul.
- Cyathus sulcatus Kalchbr.
- Cyathus verrucosus DC.

Genus: Cyeloconium

- Cyeloconuim oleaginum Cast.

Genus: Cycloschizon

- Cycloschizon brachylaenae P.Henn.
- Cycloschizon fimbriatum Doidge

Genus: Cyclotheca

- Cyclotheca bosciae Doidge

Genus: Cylindrocarpon

- Cylindrocarpon album Wollenw. var. crassum Wollenw.

Genus: Cylindrocladium

- Cylindrocladium scoparium Morgan

Genus: Cylindrosporium

- Cylindrosporium castanicolum Berl.
- Cylindrosporium chrysanthemi Ell. & Dearn.
- Cylindrosporium juglandis Wolf
- Cylindrosporium kilimandscharicum Allesch.
- Cylindrosporium padi Karst.
- Cylindrosporium ribis Davis.

Genus: Cymatoderma

- Cymatoderma elegans Jungh.

Family: Cyphellaceae

Genus: Cyphella

- Cyphella alboviolascens Karst.
- Cyphella cheesmanni Mass.
- Cyphella farinacea Kalchbr. & Cooke
- Cyphella friesii Crouan.
- Cyphella fulvodisca Cooke & Mass.
- Cyphella pelargonii Kalchbr.
- Cyphella punetiformis Karst.
- Cyphella tabacina Cooke & Phil.
- Cyphella variolosa Kalchbr.

Genus: Cystingophora

- Cystingophora deformans Syd.

Genus: Cystopus

- Cystopus amaranthi Berk.
- Cystopus austro-africanus Sacc. & Trott.
- Cystopus austro-africanus Wakef.
- Cystopus bliti de Bary.
- Cystopus candidus de Bary.
- Cystopus cubicus de Bary.
- Cystopus evansii Sacc. & Trott.
- Cystopus evansii Wakef.
- Cystopus impomoeae-panduranae Stev. & Swing.
- Cystopus portulacae de Bary.
- Cystopus quadratus Kalchbr. & Cooke
- Cystopus schlechteri Syd.
- Cystopus tragopogonis Schroet.

Genus: Cystotelium

- Cystotelium inornatum Syd.

Genus: Cytidea

- Cytidea cornea Lloyd
- Cytidea flocculenta Höhn. & Litsch
- Cytidea habgallae Martin
- Cytidea simulans Lloyd

Genus: Cytoplea

- Cytoplea adeniae du Pless.

Genus: Cytospora

- Cytospora australiae Speg.
- Cytospora chrysosperma Fr.
- Cytospora foliicola Libert
- Cytospora leucostoma Sacc.
- Cytospora sacchari Butl.
- Cytospora verrucula Saco. & Berl.
- Cytospora xanthosperma Fr.

Genus: Cytosporella

- Cytosporella aloes du Pless.

== See also ==
- List of fungi of South Africa
- List of fungi of South Africa – A
- List of fungi of South Africa – B
- List of fungi of South Africa – D
- List of fungi of South Africa – E
- List of fungi of South Africa – F
- List of fungi of South Africa – G
- List of fungi of South Africa – H
- List of fungi of South Africa – I
- List of fungi of South Africa – L
- List of fungi of South Africa – M
- List of fungi of South Africa – P
- List of fungi of South Africa – R
- List of fungi of South Africa – S
- List of fungi of South Africa – T
- List of fungi of South Africa – U
