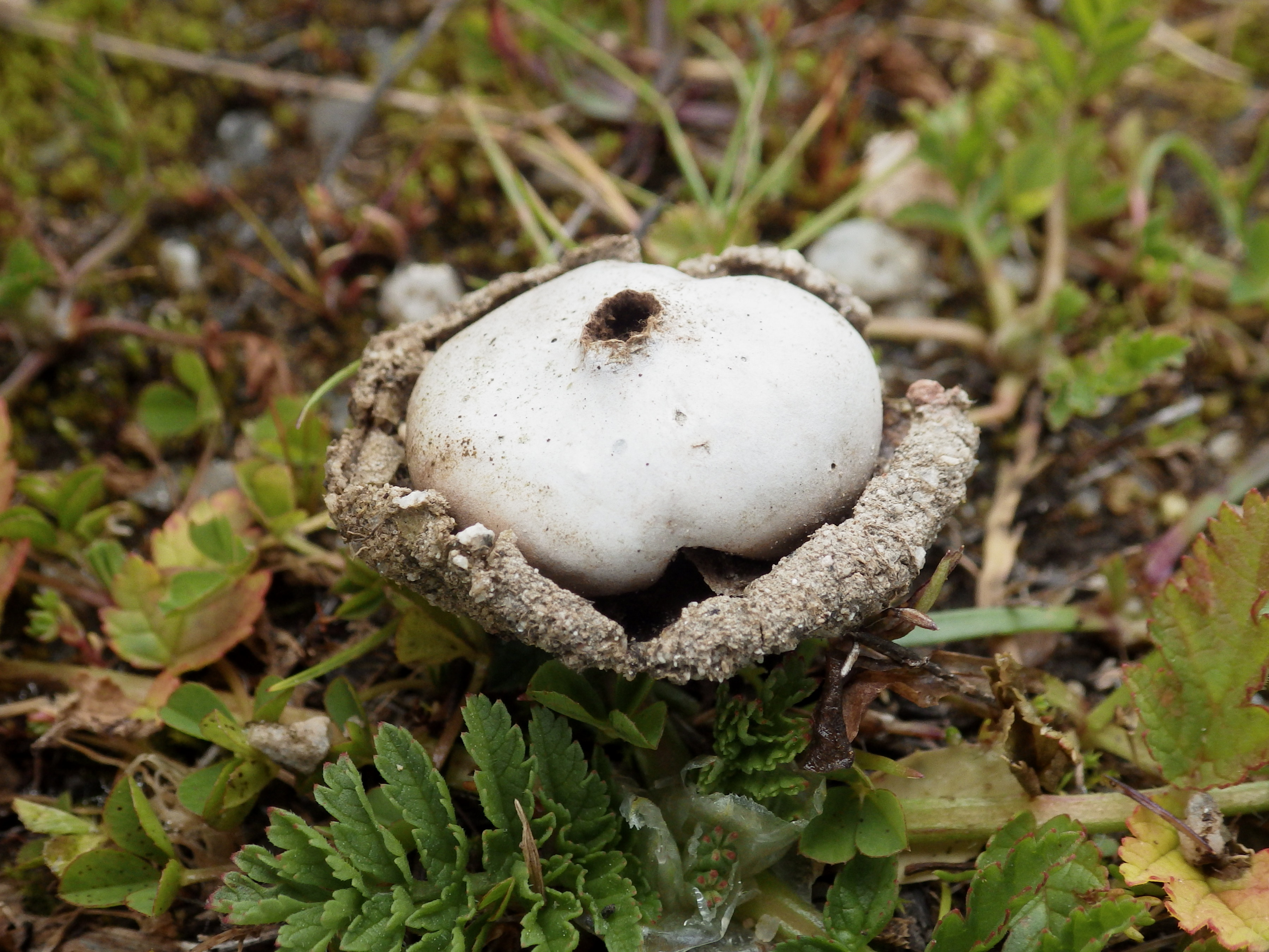

Scientific classification
- Domain: Eukaryota
- Kingdom: Fungi
- Division: Basidiomycota
- Class: Agaricomycetes
- Order: Agaricales
- Family: Agaricaceae
- Genus: Disciseda
- Species: D. bovista

Binomial name
- Disciseda bovista (Klotzsch) Henn. (1903)

Synonyms
- Geastrum bovista Klotzsch (1843)

= Disciseda bovista =

Species of fungus

Disciseda bovista is a rare species of gasteroid fungus in the family Agaricaceae. It was first described as Geastrum bovista by Johann Friedrich Klotzsch in 1843. Paul Christoph Hennings transferred it to the genus Disciseda in 1903.

== Description ==
The whitish to greyish-brown fruitbodies of Disciseda bovista are roughly spherical, measuring 10–26 mm (0.4–1.0 in) in diameter and 9–15 cm (3.5–5.9 in) tall. The base of mature fruitbodies is cushioned by a thick pad of mycelium encrusted with soil and plant debris. There is an irregularly shaped (and often torn) opening (ostiole) at the top of the fruitbody, usually 1–2 mm in diameter. The inside of the fruitbody contains the brown gleba, which is initially cottony before becoming powdery after the spores mature. The spores are strongly ornamented, and measure 6–7 μm.

Disciseda candida is quite similar in appearance, but has smaller spores (3.5–5.5 μm) with finer surface ornamentation.

== Habitat and distribution ==
Disciseda bovista grows on the ground in sunny, dry, and sandy locales that are often steppe-like. It is found in North America and Europe. Because of its rare occurrence in Europe, it has been placed on the Regional Red Lists of several countries.
