= Isariopsis clavispora =

Scientific classification
- Kingdom: Fungi
- Division: Ascomycota
- Class: Dothideomycetes
- Order: Mycosphaerellales
- Family: Mycosphaerellaceae
- Genus: Isariopsis
- Species: I. clavispora

Binomial name
- Isariopsis clavispora (Berk. & M.A.Curtis) Sacc. (1886)

Species of fungus

Isariopsis clavispora is a fungal plant pathogen that causes leaf spot on grape.
