= Mycovellosiella =

Scientific classification
- Domain: Eukaryota
- Kingdom: Fungi
- Division: Ascomycota
- Class: Dothideomycetes
- Order: Capnodiales
- Family: Mycosphaerellaceae
- Genus: Mycovellosiella; Rangel

Genus of fungi

Mycovellosiella is a genus of fungi belonging to the family Mycosphaerellaceae.

The species of this genus are found in Europe, northern America and Australia.

The genus was circumscribed by Eugenio dos Santos Rangel in Arch. Jard. Bot. Rio de Janeiro vol.2 on page 71 in 1917.

The genus name of Mycovellosiella is in honour of José Mariano de Conceição Vellozo (1742–1811), who was a Colonial Brazilian botanist who catalogued plant specimens.

== Species ==
As accepted by Species Fungorum;

- Mycovellosiella adinae Firdousi, A.N. Rai, A.S. Mishra & K.M. Vyas (1993)
- Mycovellosiella adinicola Bhalla & A.K. Sarbhoy (2000)
- Mycovellosiella aegles Kharwar & R.K. Singh (2003)
- Mycovellosiella ambrosiae (L.S. Olive) Deighton (1974)
- Mycovellosiella atylosae-scarabaeoides S.K. Singh (2004)
- Mycovellosiella bellynckii (Westend.) Constant. (1982)
- Mycovellosiella brideliae P. Kumar & Kamal (1981)
- Mycovellosiella clausenae Tak. Kobay., Manohar. & Wahyuno (1993)
- Mycovellosiella costeroana (Petr. & Cif.) X.J. Liu & Y.L. Guo (1988)
- Mycovellosiella cucurbiticola (Speg.) Deighton (1974)
- Mycovellosiella deightonii Katsuki & Y. Harada (1973)
- Mycovellosiella fici-cuneae Bhalla, N. Srivast. & Kamal (1996)
- Mycovellosiella gorakhpurensis P. Kumar & Kamal (1981)
- Mycovellosiella hyalofilispora (J.M. Yen) J.M. Yen (1981)
- Mycovellosiella hymenodictyi (Petr.) U. Braun (1995)
- Mycovellosiella iresines Munt.-Cvetk. (1960)
- Mycovellosiella litseae Meenu, Bhalla & S.K. Singh (1996)
- Mycovellosiella malvastri (Linder) Deighton (1974)
- Mycovellosiella minax (Davis) Deighton (1974)
- Mycovellosiella mucunae Kharwar, P.N. Singh & R.K. Chaudhary (1996)
- Mycovellosiella myrtacearum A.N. Rai, B. Rai & Kamal (1986)
- Mycovellosiella oryzae (Deighton & D.E. Shaw) Deighton (1979)
- Mycovellosiella paradoxa Munt.-Cvetk. (1960)
- Mycovellosiella phaseoli (O.A. Drumm.) Deighton (1974)
- Mycovellosiella pseudoidium (Speg.) U. Braun (1993)
- Mycovellosiella pyri (Farl.) U. Braun (1993)
- Mycovellosiella pyrina (Ellis & Everh.) U. Braun (1993)
- Mycovellosiella robbsii R.W. Barreto & F.S. Marini (2002)
- Mycovellosiella rosea (G. Winter) U. Braun (1993)
- Mycovellosiella rubiacearum A.N. Rai, Kamal & Shiv K. Singh (1982)
- Mycovellosiella sidae (L.S. Olive) Deighton (1974)
- Mycovellosiella terminaliae Kharwar & R.K. Singh (2003)
- Mycovellosiella verbascifolii Munt.-Cvetk. (1960)
- Mycovellosiella viticis Kharwar, P.N. Singh & R.K. Chaudhary (1996)

Former species; (most are in Mycosphaerellaceae family)

- M. abscondita Deighton (1974) = Passalora abscondita
- M. acalyphae (Tharp) U. Braun (1993) = Passalora acalyphae
- M. acericola (X.J. Liu & Y.L. Guo) X.J. Liu & Y.L. Guo (1988) = Passalora acericola
- M. acori (J.M. Yen) J.M. Yen (1981) = Passalora acori
- M. ahmesii Munt.-Cvetk. (1960) = Passalora ahmesii
- M. anamirtae Bhalla, K. Srivast. & A.K. Srivast. (1996) = Pseudocercospora anamirtae
- M. anomala (Ellis & Halst.) U. Braun (1996) = Passalora anomala
- M. antidesmatis Bhalla, S.K. Singh & A.K. Srivast. (1999) = Pseudocercospora ghissambilae
- M. ariae (Fuckel) U. Braun (1990) = Passalora ariae
- M. arthraxonis Y.L. Guo (2002) = Passalora arthraxonis
- M. asprellae U. Braun (1996) = Passalora asprellae
- M. atylosiae Raghu Ram & Mallaiah (1996) = Passalora atylosiae
- M. atylosiae Meenu, Bhalla & S.K. Singh (1996) = Mycovellosiella atylosae-scarabaeoides
- M. bartholomei (Ellis & Kellerm.) U. Braun (1998) = Passalora bartholomei
- M. bastardiae (Petr. & Cif.) U. Braun (1993) = Passalora bastardiae
- M. bauhiniae (Ellis & Everh.) U. Braun (1993) = Passalora bauhiniae
- M. berkheyae (Syd. & P. Syd.) U. Braun & Crous (1995) = Passalora berkheyae
- M. berkheyae-maritimae Crous & U. Braun (1995) = Passalora berkheyae-maritimae
- M. biformis (Peck) U. Braun (1996) = Passalora biformis
- M. boldoae N. Pons (1984) = Passalora boldoae
- M. brachycarpa (Syd.) Deighton (1974) = Distomycovellosiella brachycarpa
- M. broussonetiae Goh & W.H. Hsieh (1989) = Passalora broussonetiae
- M. buddlejae Deighton (1974) = Passalora buddlejae
- M. cajani (Henn.) Rangel ex Trotter (1931) = Passalora cajani
- M. cajani var. indica (U.P. Singh) Deighton (1974) = Passalora cajani
- M. cajani var. trichophila (Curzi) Deighton (1974) = Passalora cajani
- M. carlinae (Sacc.) Constant. (1982) = Passalora carlinae
- M. caseariae Bhalla, N. Srivast. & Kamal (1996) = Pseudocercospora caseariae-tomentosae
- M. cayaponiae (F. Stevens & Solheim) Munt.-Cvetk. (1960) = Passalora cayaponiae
- M. celtidicola Munt.-Cvetk. (1960) = Passalora celtidicola
- M. christianae Deighton (1974) = Passalora christianae
- M. clematidis Y.L. Guo (2000) = Passalora clematidina
- M. clerodendri Goh & W.H. Hsieh (1989) = Passalora clerodendri
- M. codonopsidis Y.L. Guo (2000) = Passalora codonopsidis
- M. colebrookiae Bhalla, N. Srivast. & Kamal (1996) = Pseudocercospora colebrookiae-oppositifoliae
- M. concors (Casp.) Deighton (1974) = Passalora concors
- M. consimilis (Syd.) U. Braun (1998) = Passalora consimilis
- M. convolvuli (Tracy & Earle) U. Braun (1997) = Passalora convolvuli
- M. cordiicola (J.M. Yen) R.K. Verma & Kamal (1989) = Pseudocercospora cordiicola
- M. corni Y.L. Guo (1993) = Passalora cornicola
- M. costaricensis (Syd.) Deighton (1974) = Passalora costaricensis
- M. curvispora Goh & W.H. Hsieh (1989) = Passalora curvispora
- M. dalbergiae S.K. Singh & P.N. Singh (2004) = Passalora dalbergiae
- M. delicatissima (Kalchbr. & Cooke) U. Braun (1993) = Passalora delicatissima
- M. desmodiicola B. Rai & Kamal (1985) = Pseudocercospora desmodiicola
- M. dichondrae Crous & U. Braun (1995) = Passalora dichondrae
- M. dioscoreae (Vassiljevsky) N. Pons & B. Sutton (1988) = Passalora dioscoreae-nipponicae
- M. dioscoreicola Y.L. Guo (2002) = Passalora dioscoreigena
- M. dombeyae Crous & U. Braun (1994) = Passalora dombeyae
- M. dulcamarae (Peck) U. Braun (1993) = Passalora dulcamarae
- M. duplicans (Chupp) U. Braun, Crous & Alfenas (1999) = Passalora duplicans
- M. elaeochroma (Sacc.) U. Braun (1997) = Passalora elaeochroma
- M. eucalypti Crous & Alfenas (1998) = Coremiopassalora eucalypti
- M. eupatorii-odorati (J.M. Yen) J.M. Yen (1981) = Phaeoramularia eupatorii-odorati
- M. eupatorii-odorati var. asteracearum Bhalla, S.K. Singh & A.K. Srivast. (1999) = Phaeoramularia eupatorii-odorati
- M. ferruginea (Fuckel) Deighton (1979) = Ragnhildiana ferruginea
- M. fici A.N. Rai & Kamal (1986) = Pseudocercospora fici-hispidae
- M. flexuosa (Tracy & Earle) U. Braun (1999) = Passalora flexuosa
- M. fujikuroi N. Pons (1996) = Passalora fujikuroi
- M. fulva (Cooke) Arx (1983) = Fulvia fulva
- M. gentianae (Peck) U. Braun (1997) = Passalora gentianae
- M. gliricidiae (Syd. & P. Syd.) U. Braun (1999) = Passalora gliricidiae
- M. gmelinae-arboreae A.K. Sarbhoy, Hosag. & N. Ahmad (1986) = Passalora gmelinae-arboreae
- M. gonatoclada (Syd.) Munt.-Cvetk. (1960) = Passalora gonatoclada
- M. gonatoclada (Syd.) Munt.-Cvetk. ex Deighton (1974) = Passalora gonatoclada
- M. gonostegiae Goh & W.H. Hsieh (1989) = Passalora gonostegiae
- M. greciana (Syd.) L.G. Br. & Morgan-Jones (1977) = Passalora greciana
- M. grewiae (H.C. Srivast. & P.R. Mehta) Deighton (1979) = Passalora grewiae
- M. hamamelidis (Peck) U. Braun (1993) = Passalora hamamelidis
- M. haplophragmatis Kamal & R.P. Singh (1981) = Pseudocercospora haplophragmatis
- M. hariotii (Speg.) Deighton (1974) = Passalora hariotii
- M. helianthi (Ellis & Everh.) U. Braun (1999) = Passalora helianthi
- M. holobrunnea (J.M. Yen) J.M. Yen (1981) = Passalora holobrunnea
- M. hughesii Munt.-Cvetk. (1960) = Passalora hughesii; Mycosphaerellaceae
- M. imperatae (Syd. & P. Syd.) X.J. Liu & Y.L. Guo (1988) = Passalora imperatae
- M. incarnata Deighton (1974) = Passalora incarnata
- M. indica P. Kumar & Kamal (1982) = Passalora miliusae
- M. isotomae (Cif.) U. Braun (1993) = Passalora isotomae
- M. koepkei (W. Krüger) Deighton (1979) = Passalora koepkei
- M. lactucae (Henn.) U. Braun (1999) = Passalora lactucae
- M. lantanae (Chupp) Deighton (1974) = Passalora lantanae
- M. lantanae var. cubensis Deighton (1974) = Passalora lantanae
- M. lantanae var. verbenacearum Bhalla, S.K. Singh & A.K. Srivast. (1999) = Passalora lantanae
- M. lantaniphila Crous & M.J. Morris (1994) = Passalora lantaniphila
- M. latispora (Petr.) Deighton (1974) = Passalora latispora
- M. laxa (Kalchbr. & Cooke) Deighton (1974) = Passalora laxa
- M. lobeliae-cardinalis (Schwein.) Deighton (1986) = Passalora lobeliae-cardinalis
- M. maclurae (Ellis & Langl.) Deighton (1974) = Ramularia maclurae
- M. malloti Kharwar, P.N. Singh & R.K. Chaudhary (1996) = Pseudocercospora malloti
- M. malloti-repandi Bhalla, S.K. Singh & A.K. Srivast. (1997) = Pseudocercospora malloti-repandi
- M. malvacearum B. Rai & Kamal (1985) = Passalora malvacearum
- M. manaosensis (Henn.) U. Braun, Crous & Alfenas (1999) = Passalora manaosensis
- M. maughaniae Bhalla, S.K. Singh & A.K. Srivast. (1999) = Pseudocercospora flemingiae-macrophyllae
- M. merremiae X.J. Liu & Y.L. Guo (1988) = Passalora merremiae
- M. mikaniae (F. Stevens) Deighton (1974) = Passalora mikaniae
- M. mitragynae P. Kumar & Kamal (1981) = Passalora mitragynae
- M. monrosii Munt.-Cvetk. (1960) = Passalora monrosii
- M. moracearum M.K. Khan & Kamal (1995) = Pseudocercospora ficigena
- M. murina (Ellis & Kellerm.) Deighton (1979) = Passalora murina
- M. myracrodruonis Inácio & Dianese (1999) = Passalora myracrodruonis
- M. nattrassii Deighton (1974) = Passalora nattrassii
- M. nerii-indici Bhalla, S.K. Singh & A.K. Srivast. (1997) = Passalora nerii-indici
- M. nervisequens (J. Kranz) U. Braun (1999) = Passalora nervisequens
- M. nopomingensis B. Sutton (1973) = Passalora nopomingensis
- M. paspali Deighton (1979) = Ramularia paspali
- M. passaloroides (G. Winter) J.K. Bai & M.Y. Cheng (1992) = Paramycovellosiella passaloroides
- M. paulowniicola J.M. Yen & S.K. Sun (1983) = Passalora paulowniicola
- M. peixotoae (Chupp & Viégas) Furlan. & Dianese (1996) = Passalora peixotoae
- M. perfoliati (Ellis & Everh.) Munt.-Cvetk. (1960) = Ragnhildiana perfoliati
- M. perfoliati var. nepalensis Bhalla, K. Srivast. & A.K. Srivast. (1996) = Ragnhildiana perfoliati
- M. philadelphi Y.L. Guo (1997) = Passalora philadelphi
- M. pilophila (Jacz. ex Vassiljevsky & Karak.) U. Braun (1993) = Passalora pilophila
- M. pilosae (T.S. Ramakr.) Deighton (1974) = Passalora pilosae
- M. piperis (Henn.) U. Braun (1991) = Passalora piperis
- M. pirozynskii Deighton (1987) = Passalora pirozynskii
- M. pithecellobii (J.L. Mulder) Deighton (1979) = Passalora pithecellobii
- M. poasensis (Syd.) U. Braun (1999) = Passalora poasensis
- M. pongamiae (A.K. Kar & M. Mandal) Deighton (1979) = Passalora pongamiicola
- M. prenanthis (Ellis & Kellerm.) U. Braun (1996) = Passalora prenanthis
- M. psidii Crous (1999) = Passalora psidiicola
- M. pteridis (Siemaszko) U. Braun (1997) = Passalora pteridis
- M. puerariae D.E. Shaw & Deighton (1970) = Passalora puerariae
- M. pumila (Syd. & P. Syd.) U. Braun (1998) = Passalora pumila
- M. pyricola Y.L. Guo, X.R. Chen & Shan L. Zhang (2000) = Passalora pyrophila
- M. raveneliae M.D. Mehrotra & R.K. Verma (1993) = Passalora raveneliae
- M. rhois Goh & W.H. Hsieh (1987) = Passalora rhoina
- M. rhois Y.L. Guo (2000) = Passalora guoana
- M. rosae Y.L. Guo & X.J. Liu (1987) = Passalora rosigena
- M. rufidula (Petr.) Deighton (1974) = Passalora rufidula
- M. salicis Deighton, R.A.B. Verma & S.S. Prasad (1974) = Passalora salicis
- M. sidarum (Petr. & Cif.) Deighton (1974) = Passalora sidarum
- M. solanacearum Bhalla, S.K. Singh & A.K. Srivast. (1997) = Passalora solanacearum
- M. solani-torvi (Gonz. Frag. & Cif.) Deighton (1974) = Passalora solani-torvi
- M. solenae-heterophyllae R.K. Verma & Kamal (1989) = Pseudocercospora solenae-heterophyllae
- M. subhyalina S.K. Singh & P.N. Singh (2004) = Passalora subhyalina
- M. sublateritia (Henn.) Deighton (1974) = Passalora sublateritia
- M. subrufa (Ellis & Holw.) U. Braun (1993) = Pseudocercospora subrufa
- M. taiwanensis (T. Matsumoto & W. Yamam.) X.J. Liu & Y.L. Guo (1988) = Saccharicola taiwanensis, Phaeosphaeriaceae
- M. tarrii Deighton (1974) = Passalora tarrii
- M. tasmaniensis Crous & M.J. Wingf. (1998) = Parapenidiella tasmaniensis, Teratosphaeriaceae
- M. telaria Munt.-Cvetk. (1960) = Passalora telaria
- M. teucrii (Schwein.) Deighton (1974) = Passalora teucrii
- M. toxicodendri (Ellis) U. Braun (1995) = Cercosporella toxicodendri
- M. trijugae B. Rai & Kamal (1985) = Zasmidium trijugae
- M. triseptispora (J.M. Yen) J.M. Yen (1981) = Passalora triseptispora
- M. triumfettae Deighton (1974) = Passalora triumfettae
- M. tryphostemmatis (Henn.) U. Braun (1999) = Passalora tryphostemmatis
- M. turbinae (Chupp) C.E. García & N. Pons (1997) = Passalora turbinae
- M. tylophorae (Hansf.) U. Braun (1999) = Passalora tylophorae
- M. urariae M.K. Khan, R.K. Verma & Kamal (1992) = Pseudocercospora urariae-hamosae
- M. vaginae (W. Krüger) Deighton (1979) = Passalora vaginae
- M. venturioides (Peck) U. Braun (1997) = Passalora venturioides
- M. verbesinae Munt.-Cvetk. (1960) = Passalora verbesinae
- M. vitis Y.L. Guo & X.J. Liu (1987) = Passalora vitis-piadezkii
- M. vitis-ripariae U. Braun (1997) = Passalora vitis-ripariae
- M. xenogrewiae S.K. Singh & P.N. Singh (2004) = Passalora xenogrewiae
- M. zanthoxyli Y.L. Guo & Z.M. Cao (1995) = Passalora zanthoxyli
- M. ziziphi Bhalla, K. Srivast. & A.K. Srivast. (1996) = Passalora ziziphicola
