= Isariopsis =

Scientific classification
- Domain: Eukaryota
- Kingdom: Fungi
- Division: Ascomycota
- Class: Dothideomycetes
- Order: Capnodiales
- Family: Mycosphaerellaceae
- Genus: Isariopsis; Fresen. 1863

Species
- See text

Genus of fungi

Isariopsis is a genus of fungi in the family Mycosphaerellaceae. The plant disease called isariopsis leaf spot is actually caused by Pseudocercospora vitis, formerly known as I. vitis.

== Species ==
The following species are accepted within Isariopsis:

- Isariopsis cirsii
- Isariopsis clavispora
- Isariopsis geranii
- Isariopsis indica
- Isariopsis kamatii
- Isariopsis magnoliae
- Isariopsis muehlenbeckiae
