= Mycovellosiella concors =

Scientific classification
- Domain: Eukaryota
- Kingdom: Fungi
- Division: Ascomycota
- Class: Dothideomycetes
- Order: Capnodiales
- Family: Mycosphaerellaceae
- Genus: Mycovellosiella
- Species: M. concors

Binomial name
- Mycovellosiella concors (Casp.) Deighton, (1974)

Synonyms
- Cercospora concors (Casp.) Sacc., (1886); Fusisporium concors Casp., (1855); Passalora concors (Casp.) U. Braun & Crous, (2003)

Species of fungus

Mycovellosiella concors is a fungal plant pathogen infecting potatoes.
