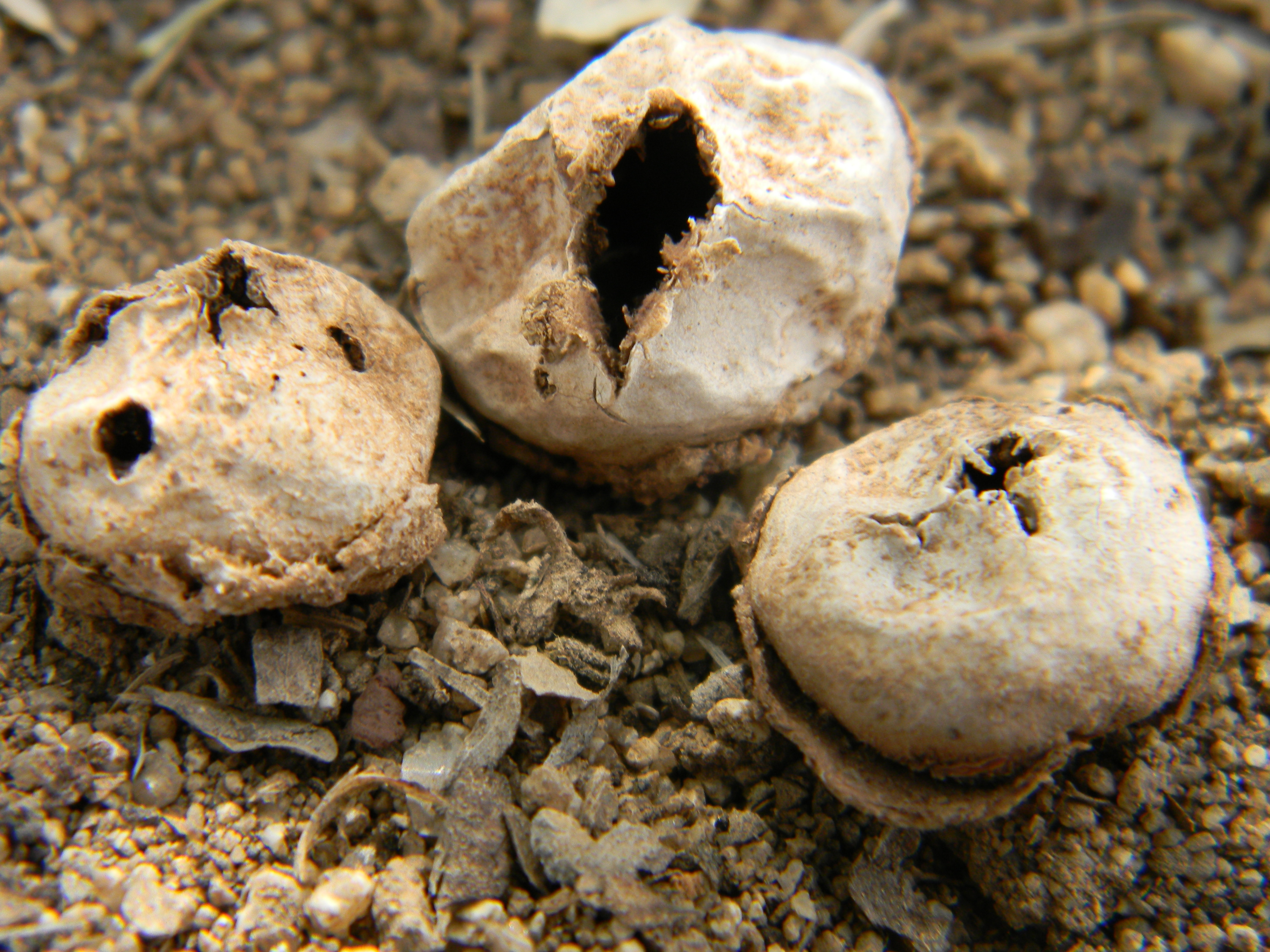
- Disciseda candida

Scientific classification
- Domain: Eukaryota
- Kingdom: Fungi
- Division: Basidiomycota
- Class: Agaricomycetes
- Order: Agaricales
- Family: Agaricaceae
- Genus: Disciseda; Czern. (1845)

Type species
- Disciseda collabescens Czern. (1845)

Synonyms
- Catastoma Morgan (1892); Bovistina Long & Stouffer (1941)

= Disciseda =

Genus of fungi

Disciseda is a genus of gasteroid fungi in the family Agaricaceae. It is a widely distributed genus that is prevalent in arid zones. Disciseda was circumscribed by mycologist Vassiliĭ Matveievitch Czernajew in 1845.

== Species ==
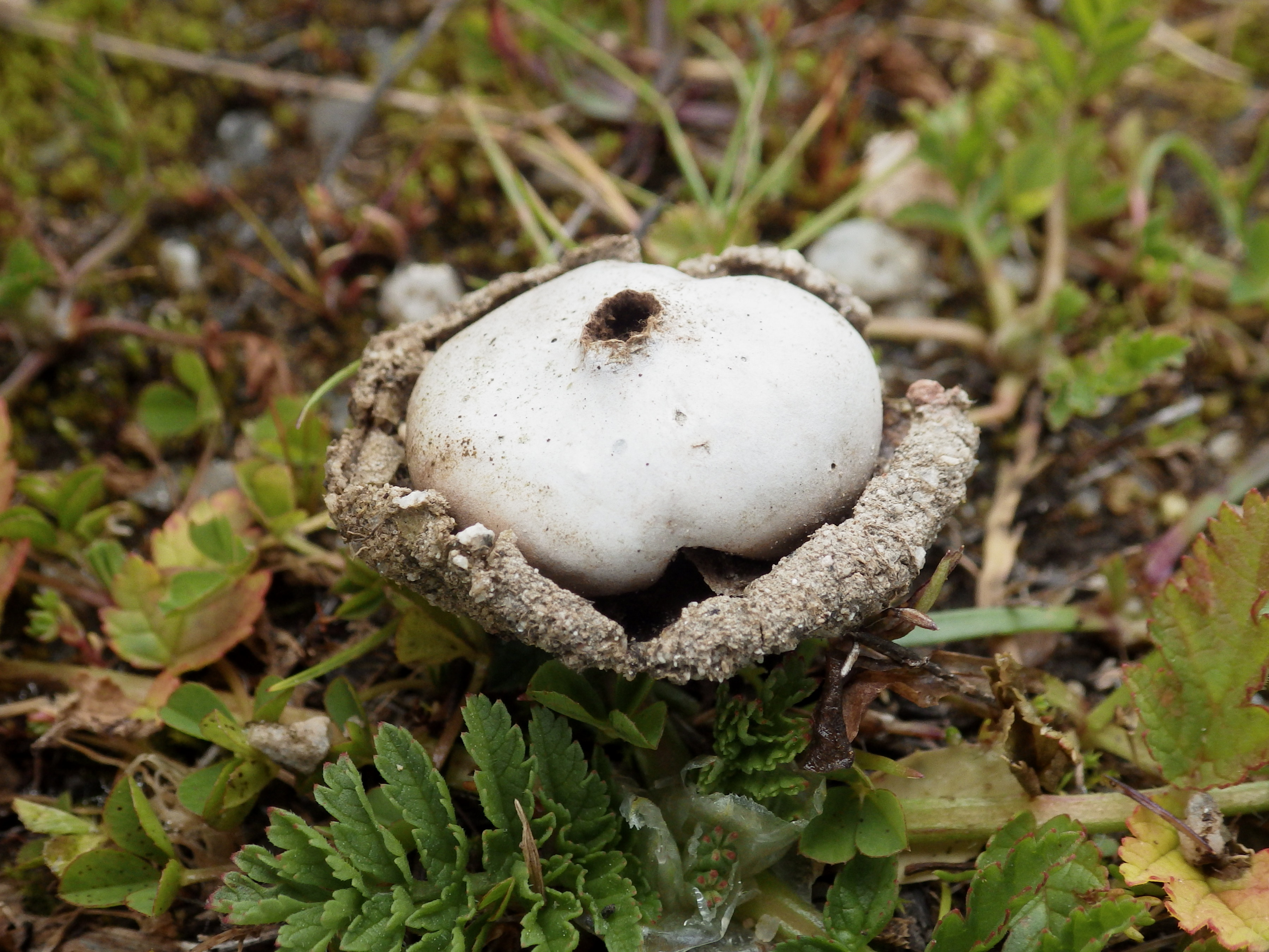
Disciseda bovista

As of December 2015, Index Fungorum accepts 36 species in Disceida:

- Disciseda africana (Har. & Pat.) Dring 1964
- Disciseda alpina Kreisel 1976
- Disciseda andina Speg. 1912
- Disciseda anomala (Cooke & Massee) G.Cunn. 1927
- Disciseda arida Velen. 1939
- Disciseda atra (Lloyd) Zeller 1947
- Disciseda australis G.Cunn. 1927 — Australia
- Disciseda bovista (Klotzsch) Henn. 1903
- Disciseda brandegei (Lloyd) Zeller 1947
- Disciseda calva (Z.Moravec) Z.Moravec 1958
- Disciseda candida (Schwein.) Lloyd 1902
- Disciseda castanea (Lév.) Bottomley 1948
- Disciseda cervina (Berk.) G.Cunn. 1927
- Disciseda circumscissa (Berk. & M.A.Curtis) Speg. 1912
- Disciseda collabescens Czern. 1845
- Disciseda compacta Czern. 1845
- Disciseda defodiodis (Lloyd) Zeller 1947
- Disciseda errurraga Grgur. 1997 — Australia
- Disciseda hollosiana Henn. 1902
- Disciseda hyalothrix (Cooke & Massee) Hollós 1902
- Disciseda hypogaea (Cooke & Massee) G.Cunn. 1927
- Disciseda johnstonii (Lloyd) Zeller 1947
- Disciseda kaloola Grgur. 1997 — Australia
- Disciseda kiata Grgur. 1997 — Australia
- Disciseda levispora (Lloyd) Zeller 1947
- Disciseda luteola (Lloyd) Zeller 1947
- Disciseda macrospora Speg. 1921
- Disciseda minima Dring 1964
- Disciseda muelleri (Berk.) G.Cunn. 1927
- Disciseda muntacola Grgur. 1997 — Australia
- Disciseda nigra Dörfelt & H.Nowak 2002
- Disciseda ochrochalcea Kreisel 1976
- Disciseda pedicellata (Morgan) Hollós 1902
- Disciseda pila R.E.Fr. 1909
- Disciseda singeri Z.Moravec 1954
- Disciseda subterranea (Peck) Coker & Couch 1928
- Disciseda uplandii (Lloyd) Zeller 1947
- Disciseda verrucosa G.Cunn. 1926 — Australia; New Zealand

== See also ==
- List of Agaricales genera
- List of Agaricaceae genera
