= Ceratosphaeria =

Scientific classification
- Kingdom: Fungi
- Division: Ascomycota
- Class: Sordariomycetes
- Order: incertae sedis
- Genus: Ceratosphaeria; Niessl (1876)

Type species
- Ceratosphaeria lampadophora (Berk. & Broome) Niessl (1876)

Species
- C. fragilis C. lampadophora C. mycophila C. ordinata C. rhenana

Genus of fungi

Ceratosphaeria is a genus of fungi in the Sordariomycetes class (subclass Sordariomycetidae) of the Ascomycota. The relationship of this taxon to other taxa within the class is unknown (incertae sedis), and it has not yet been placed with certainty into any order or family. The widespread genus contains 11 species.
