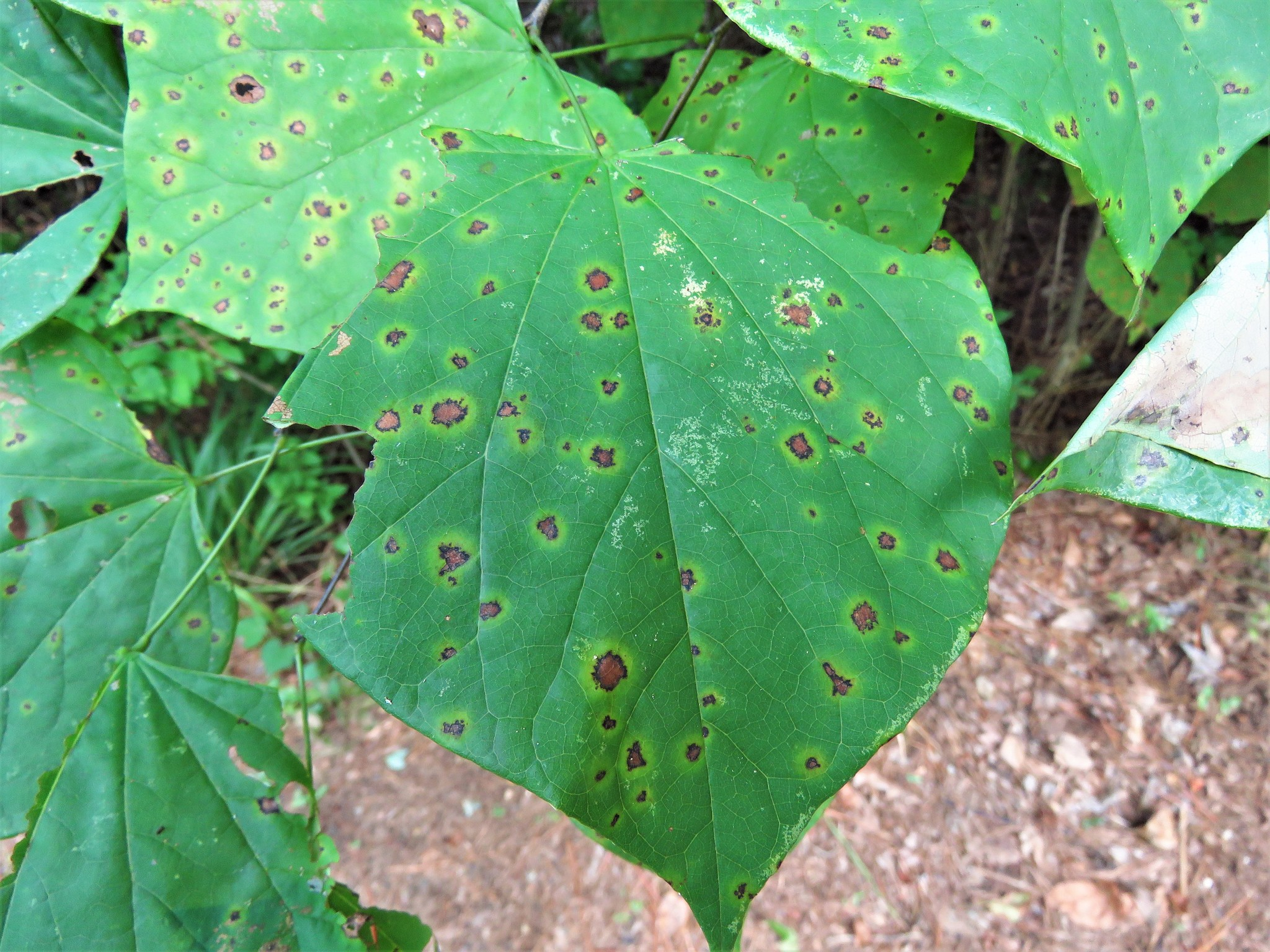

Scientific classification
- Kingdom: Fungi
- Division: Ascomycota
- Class: Dothideomycetes
- Order: Capnodiales
- Family: Mycosphaerellaceae
- Genus: Pseudocercospora
- Species: P. vitis

Binomial name
- Pseudocercospora vitis (Lév.) Speg., (1910)

Synonyms
- Cercospora viticola (Ces.) Sacc., Syll. fung. (Abellini) 4: 458 (1886); Cercospora vitis Sacc., Fungi italica autogr. del. 17–28: tab. 671 (1881); Cercospora vitis f. parthenocissi Docea, Izv. Akad. Nauk Estonsk. SSR: 406 (1968); Cercosporiopsis vitis (Lév.) Miura, (1928); Cladosporium viticola Ces., in Klotzsch, Herb. Viv. Mycol., Cent. 19: no. 1877 (1854); Cladosporium vitis (Lév.) Sacc., Mycotheca veneta 3: no. 284 (1875); Cladosporium vitis (Lév.) Miura, Flora of Manchuria and East Mongolia, III Cryptogams, Fungi (Industr. Contr. S. Manch. Rly 27): 527 (1928); Helminthosporium vitis (Lév.) Pirotta, Revue mycol., Toulouse 11(no. 44): 185 (1889); Phaeoisariopsis vitis (Lév.) Sawada, Rep. Dept Agric., Govern. Res. Inst. Formosa, Spec. Bull. Agric. Exp. Station Formosa 2: 164 (1922); Septonema vitis Lév.

= Pseudocercospora vitis =

Species of fungus

Pseudocercospora vitis is a fungal plant pathogen which causes isariopsis leaf spot, (named mistakenly after a genus of fungi in the family Mycosphaerellaceae, Isariopsis).
