= Coniothecium chomatosporum =

Scientific classification
- Kingdom: Fungi
- Division: Ascomycota
- Class: incertae sedis
- Order: incertae sedis
- Family: incertae sedis
- Genus: Coniothecium
- Species: C. chomatosporum

Binomial name
- Coniothecium chomatosporum Corda (1837)

Synonyms
- Cheiromycella chomatospora (Corda) Boerema (1973); Peyronellaea chomatospora (Corda) Goid (1952)

Species of fungus

Coniothecium chomatosporum is an ascomycete fungus that is a plant pathogen. It is found on plants of the genus Malus and Pyrus.
