= Phakopsora gossypii =

Scientific classification
- Kingdom: Fungi
- Division: Basidiomycota
- Class: Pucciniomycetes
- Order: Pucciniales
- Family: Phakopsoraceae
- Genus: Phakopsora
- Species: P. gossypii

Binomial name
- Phakopsora gossypii (Lagerh.) Hirats., (1955)

Synonyms
- Cerotelium gossypii (Lagerh.) Arthur, (1917); Kuehneola gossypii Arthur, (1912); Phakopsora desmium Cummins, (1945); Phakopsora gossypii (Arthur) Hirats. f., (1955); Uredo gossypii Lagerh., (1891)

Species of fungus

Phakopsora gossypii is a plant pathogen and causal agent of cotton rust.
