= Phanerochaete tuberculata =

Scientific classification
- Kingdom: Fungi
- Division: Basidiomycota
- Class: Agaricomycetes
- Order: Polyporales
- Family: Phanerochaetaceae
- Genus: Phanerochaete
- Species: P. tuberculata

Binomial name
- Phanerochaete tuberculata (P.Karst.) Parmasto (1968)

Synonyms
- Corticium lacteum sensu auct. (2005); Corticium lacteum f. tuberculatum (P.Karst.) Bourdot & Galzin (1928); Corticium lacteum var. tuberculatum (P.Karst.) Bourdot & Galzin (1928); Corticium tuberculatum P.Karst. (1896); Grandiniella tuberculata (P.Karst.) Burds. (1977); Peniophora stereoides Rick (1959); Thelephora lactea sensu auct. (2005)

Species of fungus

Phanerochaete tuberculata is a plant pathogen infecting plane trees.
