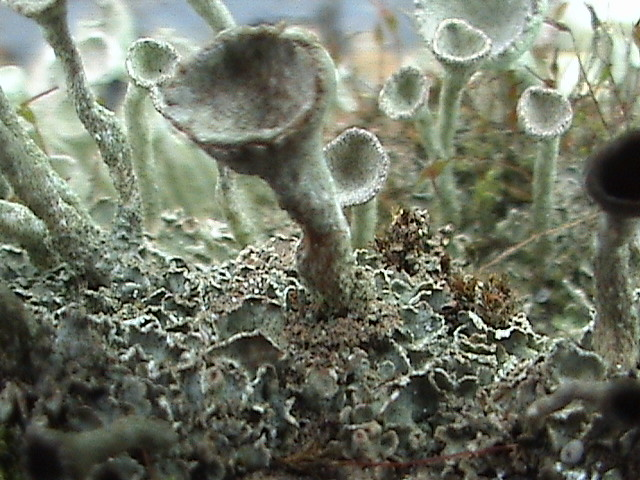

Conservation status
- Secure (NatureServe)

Scientific classification
- Kingdom: Fungi
- Division: Ascomycota
- Class: Lecanoromycetes
- Order: Lecanorales
- Family: Cladoniaceae
- Genus: Cladonia
- Species: C. fimbriata

Binomial name
- Cladonia fimbriata (L.) Fr. (1831)

Synonyms
- Lichen fimbriatus L. (1753); Cenomyce pyxidata var. fimbriata (L.) Ach.

= Cladonia fimbriata =

Species of lichen-forming fungus

Cladonia fimbriata or the trumpet cup lichen is a species cup lichen belonging to the family Cladoniaceae.

In Nepal, Cladonia fimbriata has been reported from 3,900 to 4,250 m elevation in a compilation of published records.

As of July 2021, its conservation status has not been estimated by the IUCN. In Iceland, its conservation status is denoted as data deficient (DD).

== See also ==
- List of Cladonia species
- List of lichens named by Carl Linnaeus
