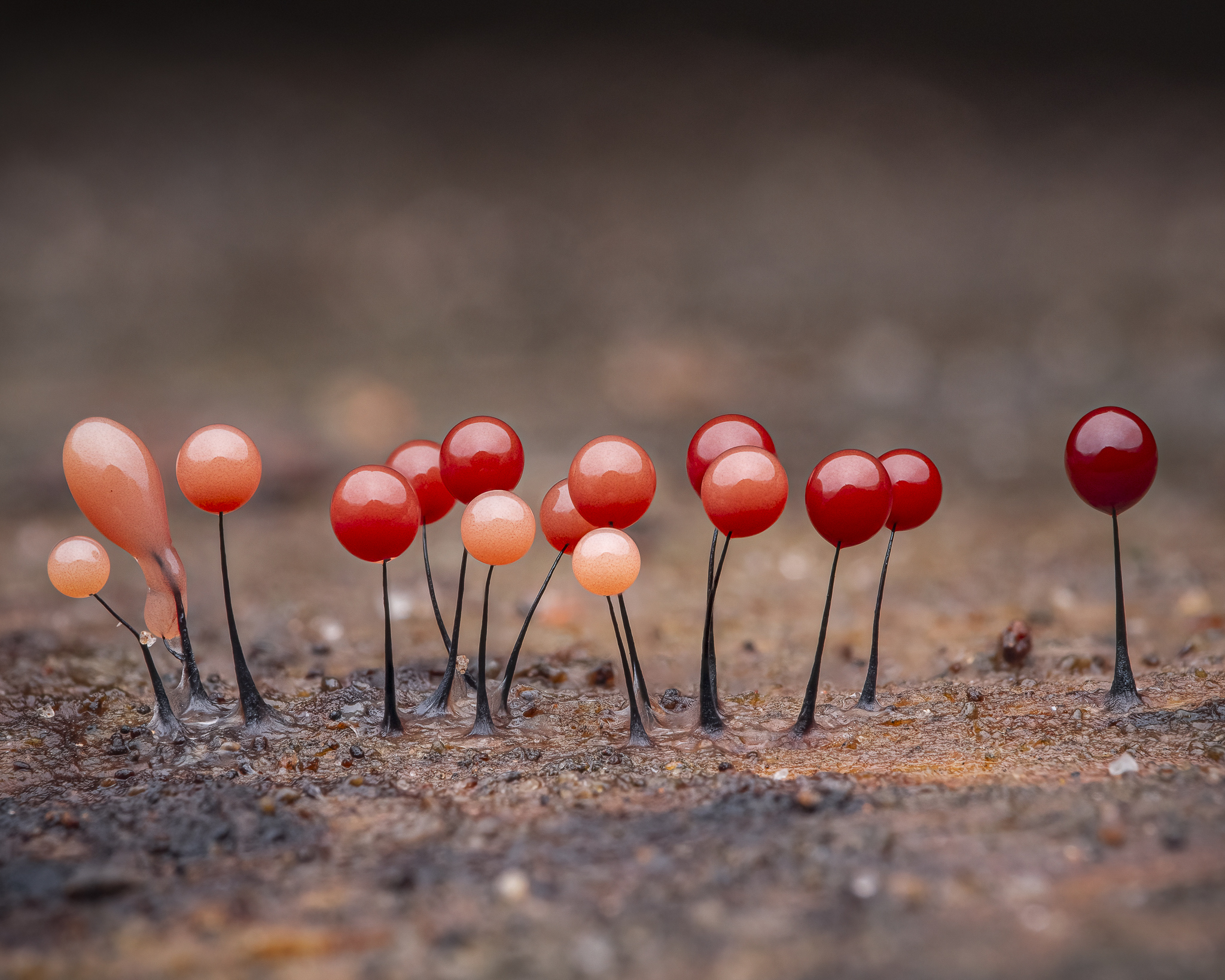
- Comatricha nigra

Scientific classification
- Domain: Eukaryota
- Supergroup: Amorphea
- Phylum: Amoebozoa
- Class: Myxogastria
- Order: Stemonitidales
- Family: Amaurochaetaceae
- Genus: Comatricha
- Species: C. nigra

Binomial name
- Comatricha nigra (Pers. ex J.F.Gmel.) J.Schröt., 1885

= Comatricha nigra =

Species of slime molds

Comatricha nigra is a widespread species of slime molds in the family Amaurochaetaceae. It grows on decayed wood on the forest floor. The sporangium reaches a total height of 2–8 mm, while the black, hair-like stalk is usually two to six times the length of the sporangium. The color of the sporangium varies as a function of its stage of development, from translucent white, to pink, bright red, and eventually black.
