= Coniothecium =

Scientific classification
- Kingdom: Fungi
- Division: Ascomycota
- Class: incertae sedis
- Order: incertae sedis
- Family: incertae sedis
- Genus: Coniothecium

Species
- See text

Genus of fungi

Coniothecium is an ascomycete fungus genus.

== Species ==
- Coniothecium agaves Petr. (1953); Anamorphic Pezizomycotina
- Coniothecium amentacearum Corda (1837), (= Trimmatostroma salicis); Anamorphic Helotiales
- Coniothecium ampelophloeum Sacc. (1892), (= Coniothyrium ampelopsidis-hederaceae); Anamorphic Leptosphaeria
- Coniothecium anaptychiae Lindau (1908), (= Monodictys anaptychiae); Anamorphic Dothideomycetes
- Coniothecium applanatum Sacc. (1880), (= Phragmotrichum applanatum); Anamorphic Pezizomycotina
- Coniothecium betulinum Corda (1837), (= Trimmatostroma betulinum); Anamorphic Helotiales
- Coniothecium chomatosporum sensu auct. NZ, (= Phoma pomorum); Anamorphic Didymella
- Coniothecium chomatosporum Corda (1837); Anamorphic Pezizomycotina
- Coniothecium complanatum (Nees) Sacc. (1879); Anamorphic Pezizomycotina
- Coniothecium conglutinatum Corda (1837); Anamorphic Pezizomycotina
- Coniothecium crustaceum (Lindner) Neger (1917), (= Sarcinomyces crustaceus); Anamorphic Pezizomycotina
- Coniothecium effusum Corda (1837); Anamorphic Pezizomycotina
- Coniothecium eriodictyonis Dearn. & Barthol. (1929), (= Trimmatostroma eriodictyonis); Anamorphic Helotiales
- Coniothecium erumpens Sacc., Syd. & P. Syd. (1904); Anamorphic Pezizomycotina
- Coniothecium glumarum Sacc. (1899), (= Blastoconium glumarum); Anamorphic Pezizomycotina
- Coniothecium graphideorum (Nyl.) Keissl. (1930), (= Milospium graphideorum); Anamorphic Pezizomycotina
- Coniothecium halimodendri Kravtzev (1961); Anamorphic Pezizomycotina
- Coniothecium haloxyli Kravtzev (1955); Anamorphic Pezizomycotina
- Coniothecium kabatii Bres. (1902); Anamorphic Pezizomycotina
- Coniothecium lichenicola Linds. (1869), (= Sclerococcum sphaerale); Anamorphic Pezizomycotina
- Coniothecium macowanii Sacc. (1886), (= Teratosphaeria macowanii); Teratosphaeriaceae
- Coniothecium perplexum Peck (1911); Anamorphic Pezizomycotina
- Coniothecium pertusariicola (Nyl.) Keissl. (1923), (= Laeviomyces pertusariicola); Anamorphic Pezizomycotina
- Coniothecium punctiforme G. Winter (1885), (= Teratosphaeria macowanii); Teratosphaeriaceae
- Coniothecium questieri Desm. (1857), (= Schiffnerula pulchra); Englerulaceae
- Coniothecium radians Sacc. (1908); Anamorphic Pezizomycotina
- Coniothecium rhois Sacc. & Trotter (1912); Anamorphic Pezizomycotina
- Coniothecium richardiae (Mercer) Jauch (1947), (= Phoma richardiae); Anamorphic Didymella
- Coniothecium silaceum (Fée) Keissl. (1930); Anamorphic Pezizomycotina
- Coniothecium sphaerale (Ach.) Keissl. (1930), (= Sclerococcum sphaerale); Anamorphic Pezizomycotina
- Coniothecium viticola Pass. (1888), (= Coniothyrium ampelopsidis-hederaceae); Anamorphic Leptosphaeria
