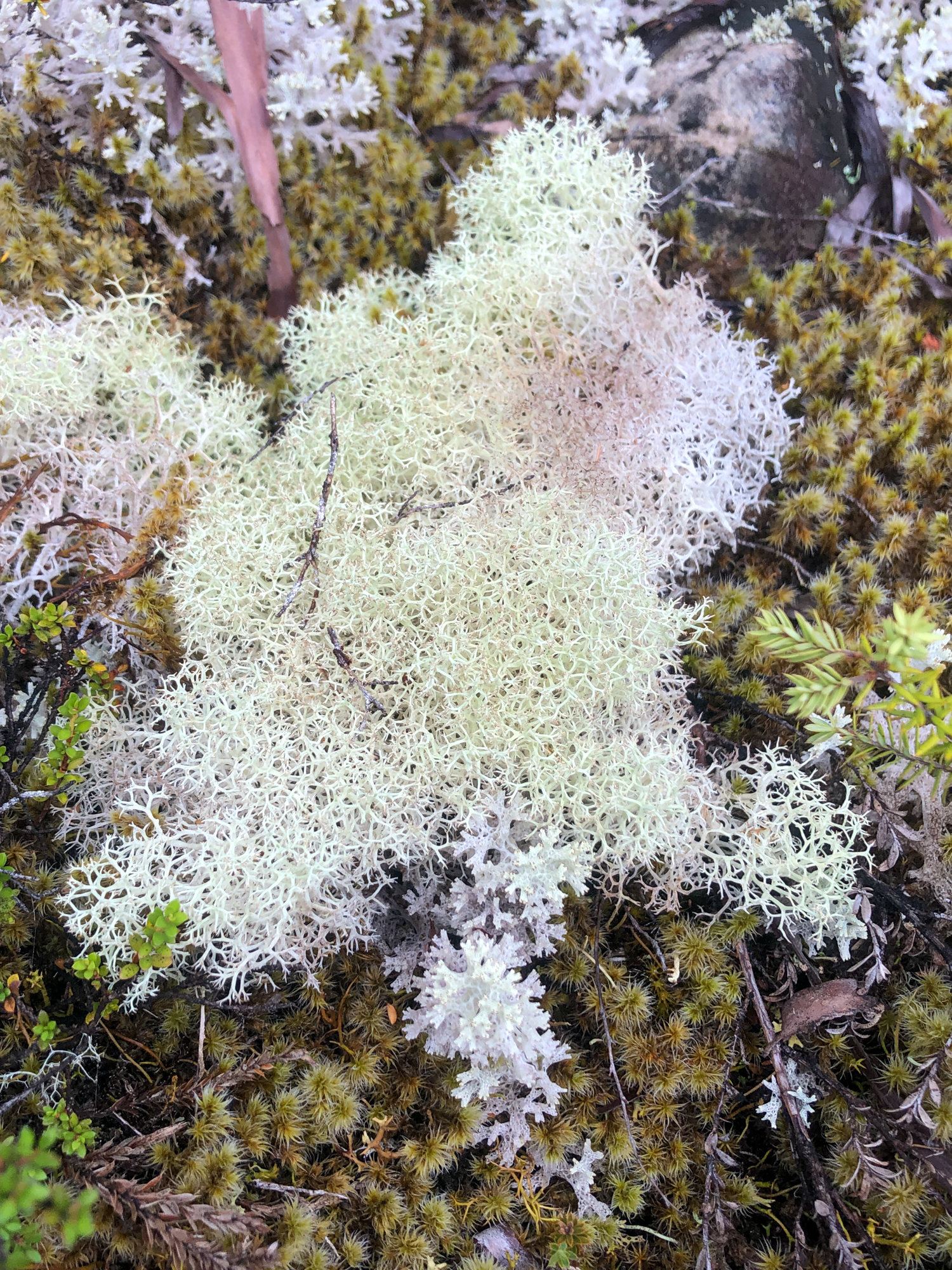
- C. confusa in Nelson Lakes National Park

Conservation status
- Not Threatened (NZ TCS)

Scientific classification
- Kingdom: Fungi
- Division: Ascomycota
- Class: Lecanoromycetes
- Order: Lecanorales
- Family: Cladoniaceae
- Genus: Cladonia
- Species: C. confusa

Binomial name
- Cladonia confusa R.Sant.

= Cladonia confusa =

Species of lichen

Cladonia confusa is a species of lichen, native to and found in New Zealand, Australia, Africa and South America. It is one of many species of the genus Cladonia, collectively often referred to as fuzzy reindeer lichen. The species was described by Rolf Santesson in 1942.

== Description ==
The yellow and green podetia form cushiony clumps up to15 cm tall. The branches may be isotomous (of equal length) or sometimes anisotomous (unequal). The trichotomous branches have perforate axils. The apothecia are terminal, brown, and convex. The surface is arachnoid, cobwebby, or cottony. The primary thallus is evanescent.

This species is known to contain usnic, perlatolic, and sometimes ursolic acids.

== Range ==
In New Zealand, it is known from across both the North and South Island. It is also found on the Three Kings Islands. It is one of the most common lichens in the neotropics. It is found in Tasmania and South Australia, as well as on Lord Howe Island and Norfolk Island. It has also been found on the island of Réunion.

== Habitat ==
This lichen is terricolous, meaning that it can be found growing directly on soil, as opposed to on rocks or trees. In New Zealand, it is found from sea level to around 2000 m in elevation. It is found in heathland there, sometimes with Leptospermum and Dracophyllum.

== Etymology ==
Confusa means "mixed" in Latin, not "confused".

== Taxonomy ==
Cladonia confusa has been said to contain the following forms:

- Cladonia confusa bicolor
- Cladonia confusa confusa

but these are better considered simply chemodemes, populations within a species that have slightly different chemical compositions, but are ultimately not taxonomically distinct.

While specimens of C. confusa were collected and sent to J.D. Hooker at Kew Gardens by Charles Knight as early as September 24, 1888, the species was not described until 1942 by Rolf Santesson.
