= Cochliobolus stenospilus =

Scientific classification
- Domain: Eukaryota
- Kingdom: Fungi
- Division: Ascomycota
- Class: Dothideomycetes
- Order: Pleosporales
- Family: Pleosporaceae
- Genus: Cochliobolus
- Species: C. stenospilus

Binomial name
- Cochliobolus stenospilus T. Matsumoto & W. Yamam., (1936)

Synonyms
- Bipolaris stenospila (Drechsler) Shoemaker, (1959); Drechslera stenospila (Drechsler) Subram. & B.L. Jain, (1966); Helminthosporium stenospilum Drechsler, (1928)

Species of fungus

Cochliobolus stenospilus is a fungal plant pathogen that causes the disease "brown stripe" in sugar cane.
