= Mycovellosiella vaginae =

Scientific classification
- Kingdom: Fungi
- Division: Ascomycota
- Class: Dothideomycetes
- Order: Mycosphaerellales
- Family: Mycosphaerellaceae
- Genus: Mycovellosiella
- Species: M. vaginae

Binomial name
- Mycovellosiella vaginae (W. Krüger) Deighton, (1979)

Synonyms
- Cercospora vaginae W. Krüger, (1896); Passalora vaginae (W. Krüger) U. Braun & Crous, in Crous & Braun (2003)

Species of fungus

Mycovellosiella vaginae is a fungal plant pathogen infecting sugarcane.
