= Mycovellosiella koepkei =

Scientific classification
- Domain: Eukaryota
- Kingdom: Fungi
- Division: Ascomycota
- Class: Dothideomycetes
- Order: Capnodiales
- Family: Mycosphaerellaceae
- Genus: Mycovellosiella
- Species: M. koepkei

Binomial name
- Mycovellosiella koepkei (W. Krüger) Deighton, (1979)

Synonyms
- Cercospora koepkei W. Krüger [as 'koepkii'], (1890); Passalora koepkei (W. Krüger) U. Braun & Crous, (2003); Pseudocercospora miscanthi Katsuki, (1956)

Species of fungus

Mycovellosiella koepkei is a fungal plant pathogen infecting sugarcane.
