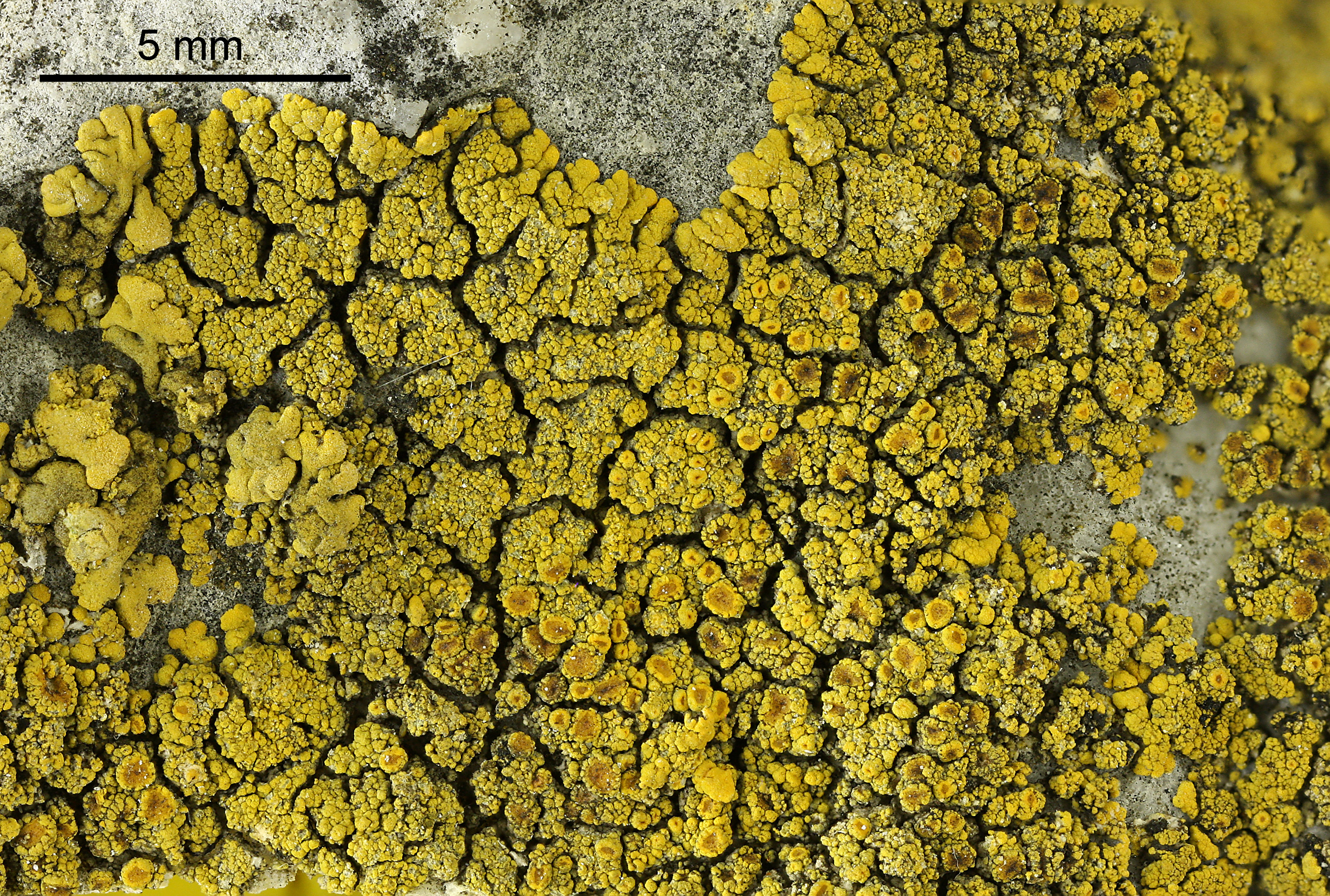

Scientific classification
- Domain: Eukaryota
- Kingdom: Fungi
- Division: Ascomycota
- Class: Lecanoromycetes
- Order: Teloschistales
- Family: Teloschistaceae
- Genus: Flavoplaca
- Species: F. granulosa

Binomial name
- Flavoplaca granulosa (Müll.Arg.) Arup, Frödén & Søchting (2013)

Synonyms
- List: Amphiloma granulosum Müll.Arg. (1862); Placodium granulosum (Müll.Arg.) Hepp (1867); Lecanora granulosa (Müll.Arg.) Wedd. (1875); Physcia granulosa (Müll.Arg.) Arnold (1875); Gasparrinia granulosa (Müll.Arg.) P.Syd. (1887); Caloplaca granulosa (Müll.Arg.) J.Steiner (1894)

= Flavoplaca granulosa =

Species of lichen

Flavoplaca granulosa is a species of crustose lichen in the family Teloschistaceae. It was originally described as a new species by Johannes Müller Argoviensis in 1862, as a member of the genus Amphiloma. After having spent time in various genera throughout its taxonomic history, it was reclassified in Flavoplaca in 2013 following a molecular phylogenetics-informed reorganization of the Teloschistaceae.
