= Ceratocystis pilifera =

Scientific classification
- Kingdom: Fungi
- Division: Ascomycota
- Class: Sordariomycetes
- Order: Microascales
- Family: Ceratocystidaceae
- Genus: Ceratocystis
- Species: C. pilifera

Binomial name
- Ceratocystis pilifera (Fr.) C. Moreau, (1952)

Synonyms
- Ceratocystis ambrosia Ceratocystis capillifera Ceratocystis longirostellata Ceratostoma pilifera Ceratostoma piliferum Ceratostomella capillifera Ceratostomella pilifera Linostoma piliferum Ophiostoma ambrosium Ophiostoma capilliferum Ophiostoma longirostellatum Ophiostoma piliferum Sphaeria pilifera Sphaeronaema pilifera

Species of fungus

Ceratocystis pilifera is a fungal plant pathogen. It has been shown to be transmitted via soil in a Pinus sylvestris dominated forest in Poland.
