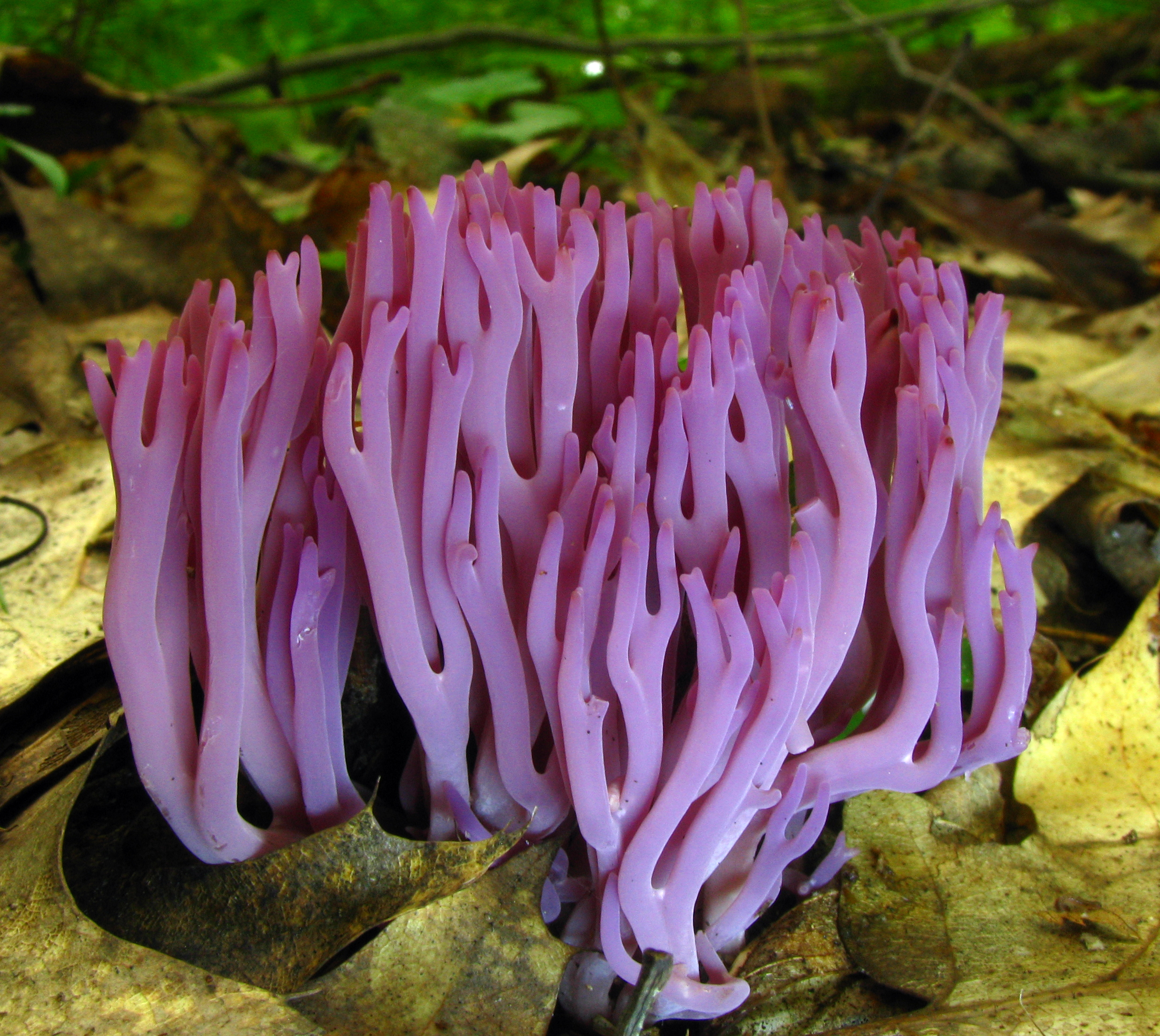

Conservation status
- Vulnerable (IUCN 3.1)

Scientific classification
- Kingdom: Fungi
- Division: Basidiomycota
- Class: Agaricomycetes
- Order: Agaricales
- Family: Clavariaceae
- Genus: Clavaria
- Species: C. zollingeri

Binomial name
- Clavaria zollingeri Lév. (1846)

Synonyms
- Clavaria lavendula Peck (1910)

= Clavaria zollingeri =

Species of fungus

Clavaria zollingeri Mycological characteristics
- Smooth hymenium
- No distinct cap
- Hymenium attachment is not applicable
- Lacks a stipe
- Spore print is white
- Ecology is saprotrophic
- Edibility is not recommended or inedible

Clavaria zollingeri, commonly known as the violet coral or the magenta coral, is a widely distributed species of fungus. It produces striking tubular, purple to pinkish-violet fruit bodies that grow up to 10 cm (4 in) tall and 7 cm (2 3/4 in) wide. The extreme tips of the fragile, slender branches are usually rounded and brownish. Variations in branching and color can often be used to distinguish C. zollingeri from similarly colored coral fungi such as Alloclavaria purpurea and Clavulina amethystina, although microscopy is required to reliably identify the latter species.

A typical member of the clavarioid or club fungi, C. zollingeri is saprobic, deriving nutrients by breaking down organic matter. The fruit bodies are typically found growing on the ground in woodland litter or in grasslands.

== Taxonomy ==
The species was first described scientifically by French mycologist Joseph-Henri Léveillé in 1846. It was named after Swiss botanist Heinrich Zollinger, who researched the genus Clavaria, and collected the type specimen in Java, Indonesia. Léveillé considered the dichotomous branching to be the prominent characteristic that separated this species from the otherwise similar Clavaria amethystina. American Charles Horton Peck published a species collected from Stow, Massachusetts as Clavaria lavendula in 1910, but this is a synonym. The mushroom is commonly known as the "violet coral", or the "magenta coral".

In a 1978 classification of the genus Clavaria, Ronald Petersen placed C. zollingeri in the subgenus Clavaria, a grouping of species with clamp connections absent from all septa in the fruit body; others in the subgenus included C. purpurea, C. fumosa, and the type, C. fragilis. A large-scale molecular analysis of the phylogenetic distributions and limits of clavarioid fungi in the family Clavariaceae was published by Bryn Dentiger and David McLaughlin in 2006. Based on their analysis of ribosomal DNA sequences, C. zollingeri shared the greatest genetic similarity with Clavulinopsis laeticolor. Petersen's concept of the infrageneric classification of Clavaria was largely rejected in this analysis, as two of the three subgenera he proposed were found to be polyphyletic.

== Description ==
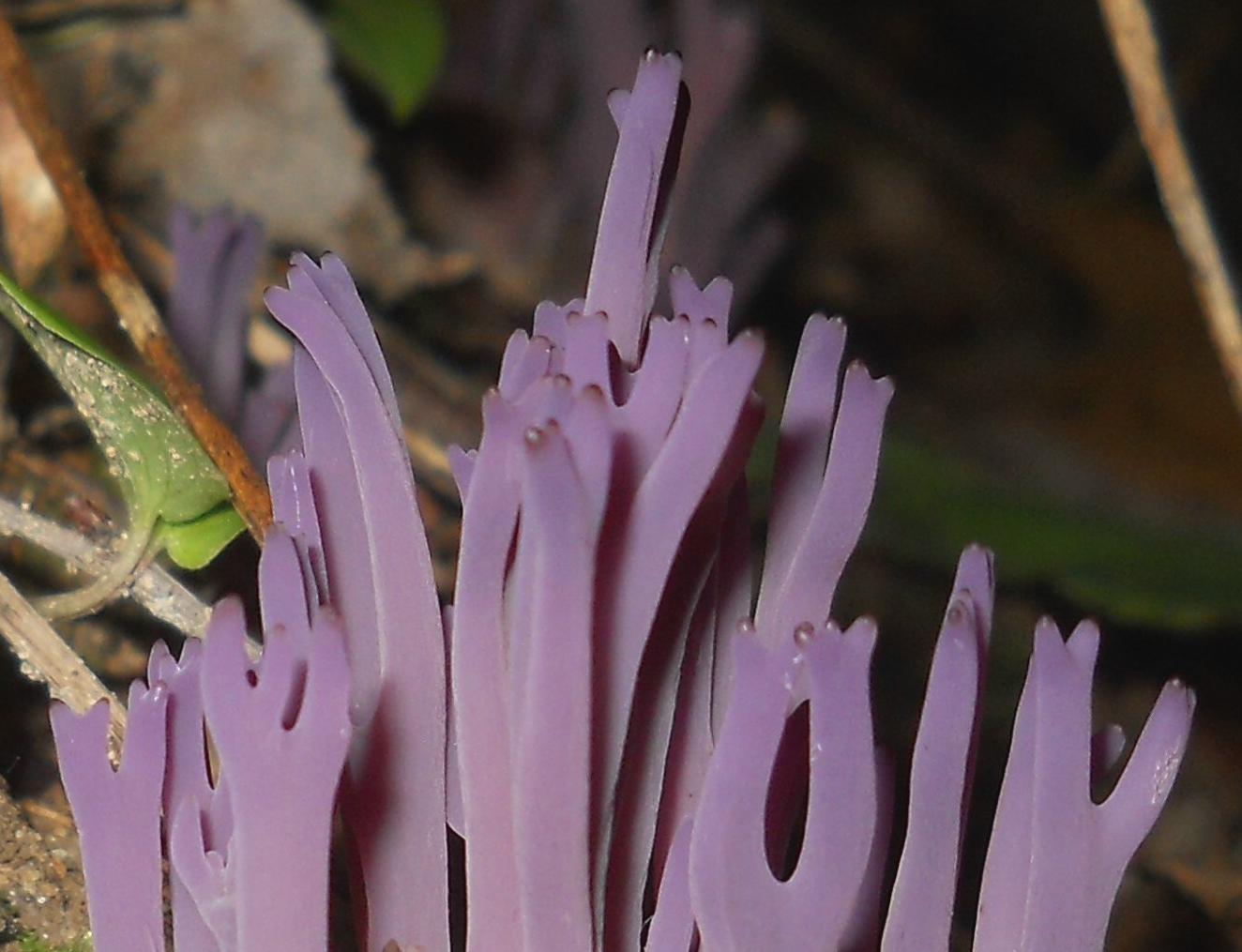
The extreme tips of the branches are rounded and brownish.

The coloring of the fruit bodies is quite variable, ranging from violet to amethyst, or violet shaded with brown or red. The colors may be variable over the fruit body; in one instance the outside branches were brown while the inner branches in the center of the bundle were light violet. Dried specimens may lose their coloring almost entirely, as the pigments may be sensitive to light or dryness. The fruit body is typically 5 to 10 cm (2 to 4 in) tall and 4 to 7 cm (1 1/2 to 2 3/4 in) wide. The stem, or base, is short, and the branching starts a short distance above the ground. The surfaces of the fragile branches are smooth and dry; the branches are 2–6 thick, typically with rounded tips. It has no distinguishable odor, and a taste somewhat like radishes or cucumber.

In mass, the spores (produced on the surface of the branches) are white. Light microscopy reveals additional details: the spores are roughly spherical to broadly elliptical, with dimensions of 4–7 by 3–5 μm. They have a clear apiculus about 1 μm long, and a single large oil droplet. The basidia (spore-bearing cells) are four-spored, do not have clamps, and measure 50–60 by 7–9 μm, gradually widening at the apex.

=== Similar species ===
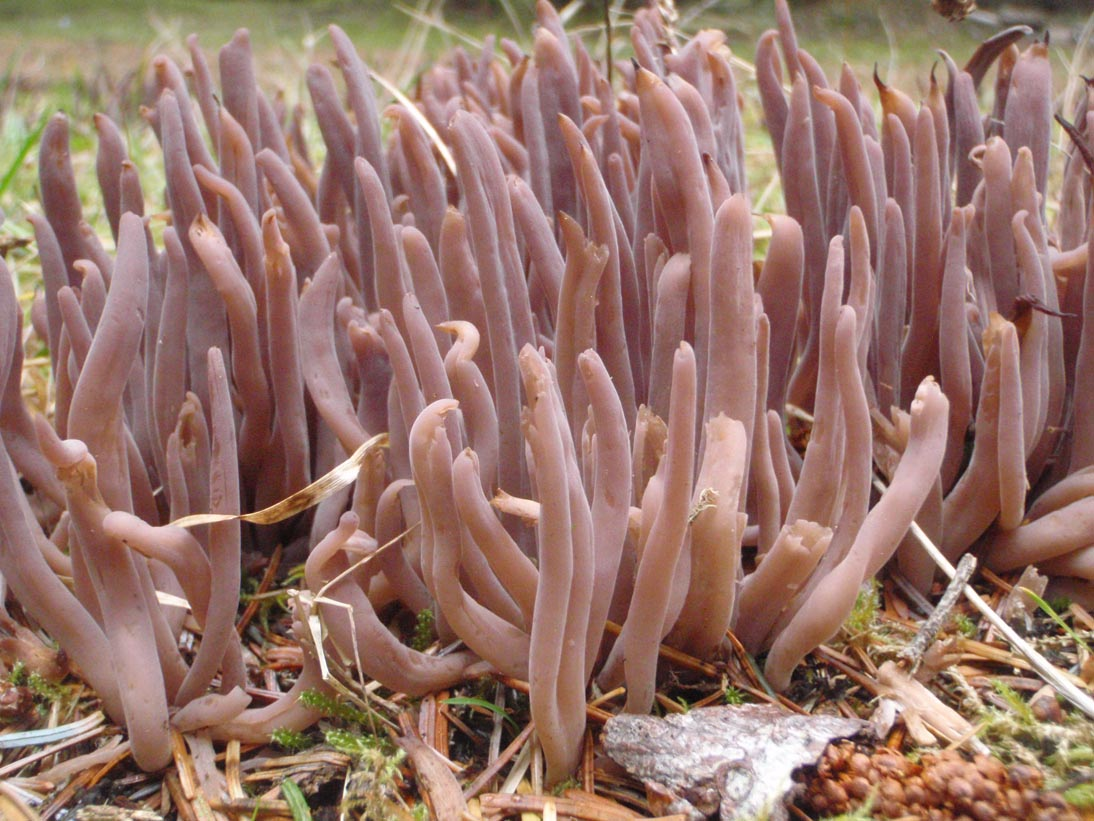
Alloclavaria purpurea

Other lavender to violet-colored corals include Clavulina amethystinoides, which is so multiply branched so as to appear toothed, and Clavulina amethystina, which can only be reliably distinguished by its two-spored basidia in comparison to the four-spored basidia of Clavaria species. In Alloclavaria purpurea, the branching is reduced and the color usually a duller purple. The Australian coral Clavaria versatilis is also similar in appearance to C. zollingeri, but has branch tips that end in two short and blunt processes that are the same color as the rest of the fruit body. Ramariopsis pulchella—a small, violet-colored coral fungus rarely taller than 3 cm (1 1/4 in)—could be mistaken for a small C. zollingeri. It has roughly spherical spores measuring 4–7 by 3–5 μm. Ramaria purpurissima is larger and has an orangish spore print.

== Habitat and distribution ==
The fruit bodies of C. zollingeri grow either solitarily, in groups, or in clusters on the ground in grassy spots, usually near hardwood trees, or with mosses. It is a saprobic species, deriving nutrients by breaking down organic matter. It has a widespread distribution, and has been found in Australia, New Zealand, North America, South America, and Asia (including Brunei, India, and Korea). In North America, the distribution is restricted to the northeastern regions of the continent but have been found in some isolated areas as far south as Northern Arkansas. Rare in Europe, it is listed in the Red Lists of threatened species in Denmark and Great Britain. In Ireland, it is used as an indicator species to help assess the fungal diversity of nutrient-poor grasslands, a habitat under threat. It was recorded from the Netherlands for the first time in 2006.

== Edibility ==
Although reported to be edible in small quantities, the fragile fruit bodies are of limited culinary value, and may have a laxative effect. Some guides say it is inedible.

== Bioactive compounds ==
Clavaria zollingeri contains lectins, a class of proteins that bind specific carbohydrates on the surface of cells, causing them to clump together. A Korean study demonstrated that extracts of the fungus caused lymphoagglutination, a specific form of agglutination that involves white blood cells. In general, lectins are used in blood typing and serology, and they are widely used in affinity chromatography for purifying proteins.
