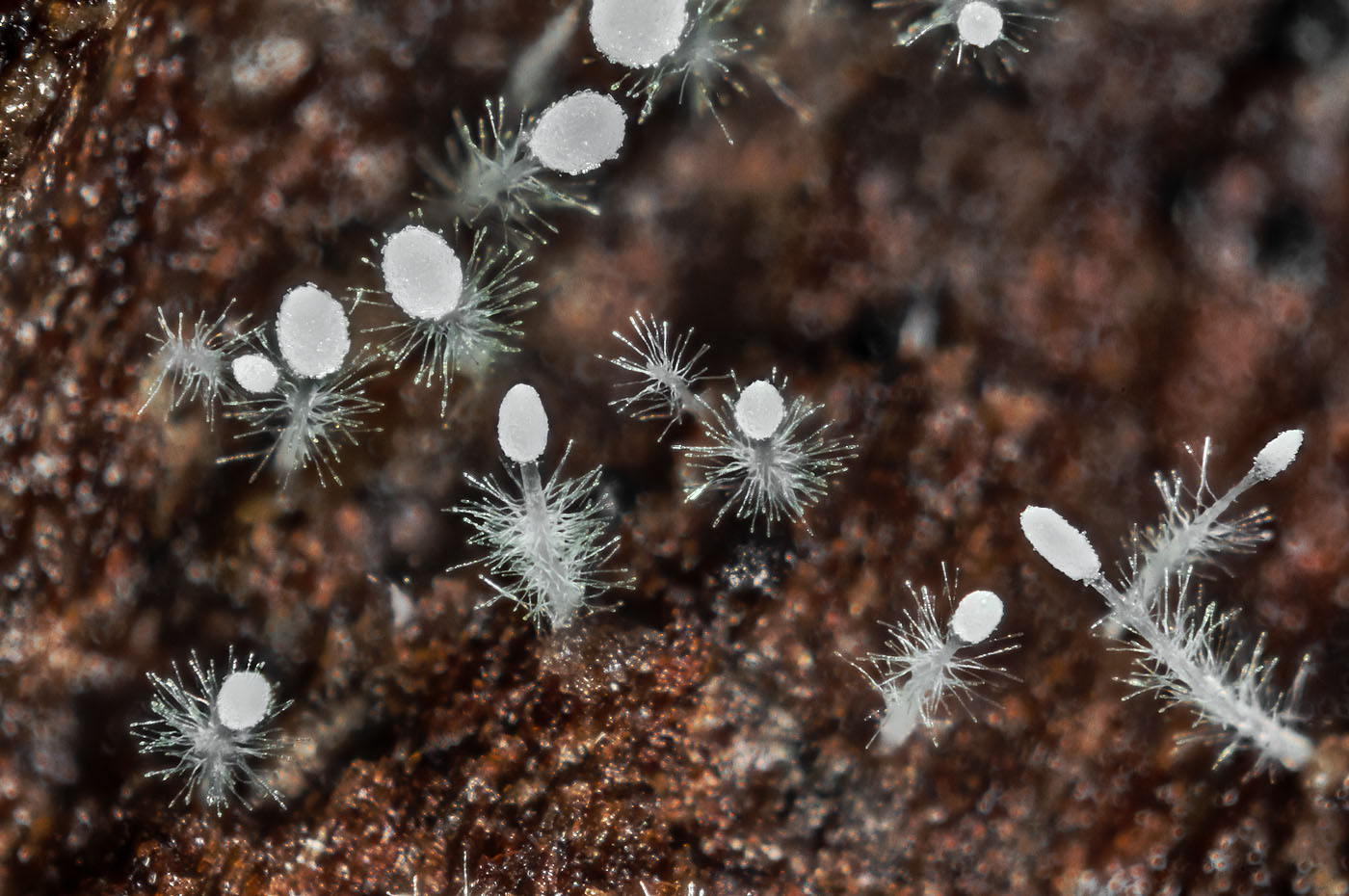

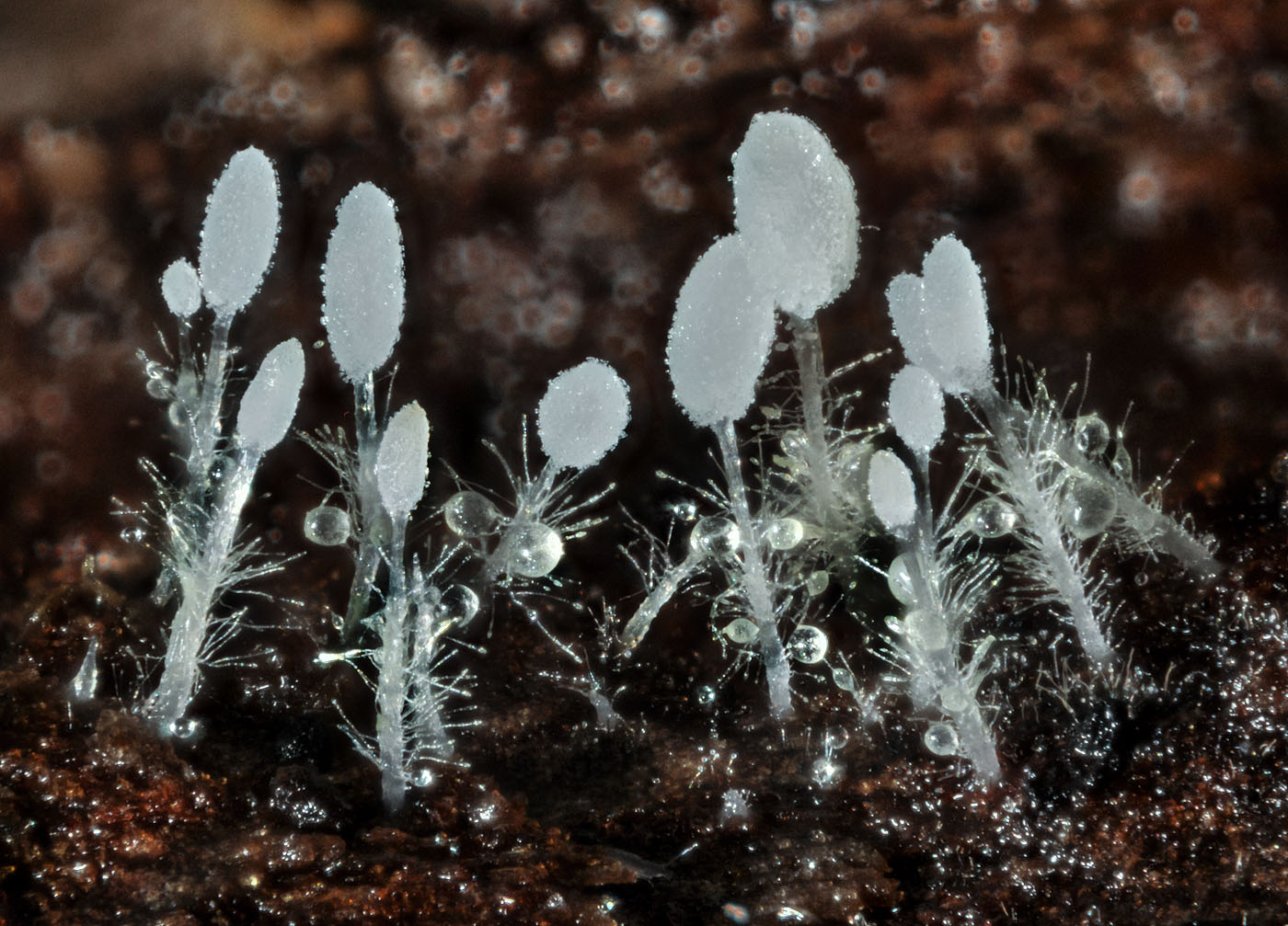

Scientific classification
- Domain: Eukaryota
- Kingdom: Fungi
- Division: Basidiomycota
- Class: Agaricomycetes
- Order: Agaricales
- Family: Clavariaceae
- Genus: Hirticlavula; J.H.Petersen & Læssøe (2014)
- Species: H. elegans

Binomial name
- Hirticlavula elegans J.H.Petersen & Læssøe (2014)

= Hirticlavula =

Genus of fungi

Hirticlavula Mycological characteristics
- Ecology is saprotrophic
- Edibility is unknown

Hirticlavula is a fungal genus in the family Clavariaceae. It contains a single described species, Hirticlavula elegans. Formally described in 2014, the fungus has been collected from Norway and Denmark. H. elegans produces white fruit bodies up to 1.1 millimetres (0.043 in) in height. Each fruit body contains a fertile head atop a hairy stem. The fruit bodies grow directly from dead bark or wood, where they feed as saprotrophs. Both morphological and ecological details are distinctive when compared to other clavarioid fungi.

== Taxonomy ==
Hirticlavula elegans was described based on collections dating back to 1995. It was provisionally reported in 2009 in the proceedings of a 2008 conference, before being formally described in 2009 by Jens H. Petersen and Thomas Læssøe in an article in Karstenia, coauthored with Marie L. Davey. The specific name elegans is from the Latin meaning "elegant", and refers to how "pretty" the species's fruit bodies are. In Danish, the species has the common name hårkølle. Phylogenetic analysis suggests that within the Clavariaceae, Hirticlavula is a sister to the clade comprising Clavaria, Camarophyllopsis and Hodophilus.

== Description ==
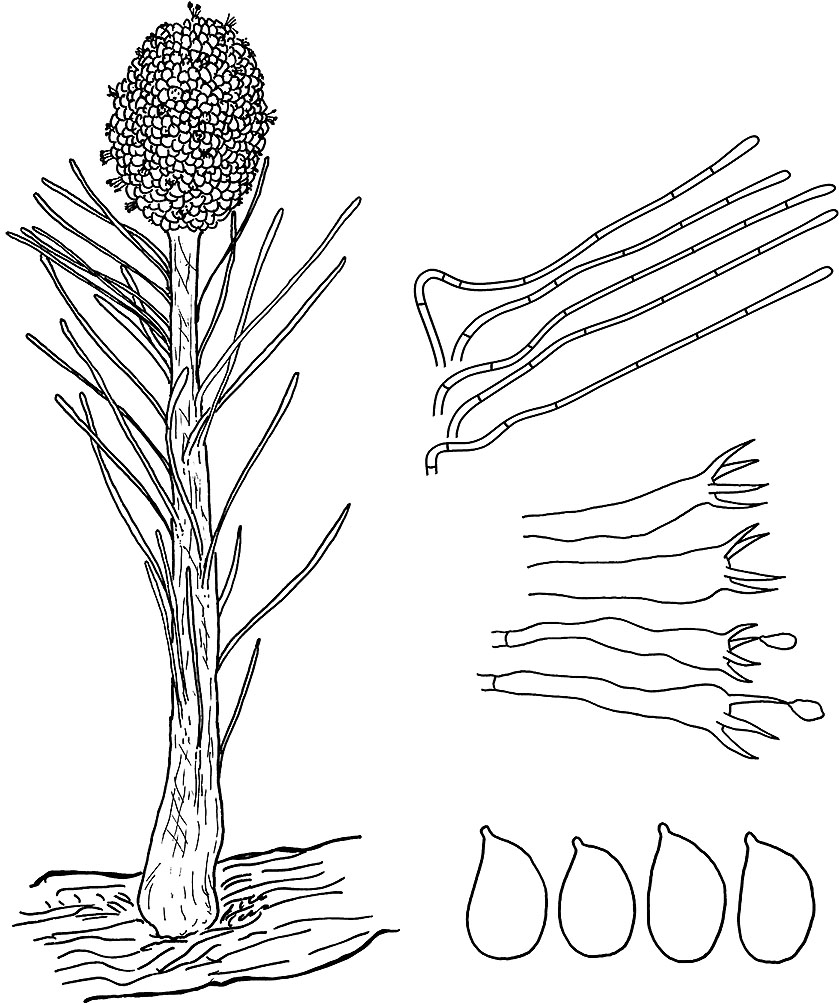
Clockwise from left: The fruit bodies, the hairs, the basidia and the spores.

Hirticlavula elegans produces white fruit bodies from 800 to 1100 micrometres (μm) in height. The robust and fertile head measures from 230 to 260 by 90 to 200 μm, while the hairy stem measures between 600 and 800 by 40 to 60 μm. The fruit bodies mostly retain their shape when dried, but do develop a cream tinge. The fruit bodies do not emerge from a sclerotium, but instead grow directly from the substrate.

The basidia are cyanophilous, meaning that the cell walls will readily absorb methyl blue stain. They measure 14 to 22 by 3.5 to 5 μm, and each sport four "curved and remarkably thin" sterigmata. The sterigmata are 4–5 μm in length. The smooth, broadly ellipsoid spores measure 4.5 to 6.5 by 3–4.2 μm. They are hyaline, and either cyanophilous or containing cyanophilous particles. They contain no prominent crystals, and are topped by a 0.8 μm-long apiculus (the section that connects to the sterigmatum). The hyphae lack clamp connections, and the hyphal structure is monomitic, meaning that only generative hyphae are present. In the stem, the 1–2 μm-wide hyphae run parallel to one another, but are less regular towards the base.

The hairs on the stem are straight and point away from the substrate, emerging from the stems at oblique angles. They are 150 to 250 μm in length; at the base, they are 1.5 to 2.5 μm in width, while at the rounded to club-shaped tips, they are 3 to 4.5 μm in width. The hairs do not branch, have moderately thick walls and are somewhat septate. Individual cells in the hairs measure 10 to 30 μm in length.

It is unknown whether the fruit bodies are edible, but they are unlikely to be of interest to mushroom hunters due to the small size.

=== Similar species ===
Hirticlavula elegans fruit bodies are highly distinctive. The characteristic hairy stems are very different from those of any other species in the Clavariaceae. Hairy stems are seen among more distant relatives, including members of Typhula, Pistillina and Pterula. However, the hairs of H. elegans are specialised structures containing numerous cells, while the more irregular hairs on the stems of the other species are merely branched hyphae. In addition, the hairs on the H. elegans stems thicken at the furthest point from the stem, while any hairs on the stems of other known species of clavarioid fungi thin at the end.

== Distribution and ecology ==
Hirticlavula elegans is known from Denmark and Norway. The fruit bodies grow directly from the wood or, more usually, the bark of hardwoods. Identified substrates include oaks, willows, hazels and possibly birches. The ecology of the species is distinctive; while other members of the Clavariaceae are biotrophic (feeding upon living plant matter), H. elegans grows on dead plant matter as a saprotroph. The species fruits from May to October, longer than the fruiting of any other very small clavarioid fungi known to the describing authors.

== See also ==
- List of Agaricales genera
