= Clavaria maricola =

Scientific classification
- Domain: Eukaryota
- Kingdom: Fungi
- Division: Basidiomycota
- Class: Agaricomycetes
- Order: Agaricales
- Family: Clavariaceae
- Genus: Clavaria
- Species: C. maricola

Binomial name
- Clavaria maricola Kauffman (1928)

Synonyms
- Clavariadelphus maricola (Kauffman) Corner (1950); Clavulinopsis maricola (Kauffman) R.H.Petersen (1972)

Species of coral fungus

Clavaria maricola is a species of coral fungus in the family Clavariaceae. It was first formally described as a new species by American mycologist Calvin Henry Kauffman in 1928. The type was collected by Kauffman from the Rogue River–Siskiyou National Forest in Takilma, Oregon. The fruit body is orange-yellow, reaching heights of 7–10 cm (2.8–3.9 in) with a thickness of 2–6 mm. He noted that the fungus grew on the needle beds of Pinus ponderosa, where it was mostly attached to male pine cones, but rarely to the needles. The species name derives from the roots mas ("male"), and colo ("I inhabit").
