= Clavaria globospora =

Scientific classification
- Domain: Eukaryota
- Kingdom: Fungi
- Division: Basidiomycota
- Class: Agaricomycetes
- Order: Agaricales
- Family: Clavariaceae
- Genus: Clavaria
- Species: C. globospora

Binomial name
- Clavaria globospora Kauffman (1928)

Synonyms
- Clavaria americana R.H.Petersen (1969)

Species of coral fungus

Clavaria globospora is a species of coral fungus in the family Clavariaceae. It was first formally described as a new species by American mycologist Calvin Henry Kauffman in 1928. The type was collected by Kauffman at Lake Quinault in Washington. The fruit body is cream-buff, reaching heights of 6–8 cm (2.4–3.1 in) with a thickness of 1.5–2 mm. He noted that the fungus grew on very rotten conifer wood in swampy forest. The species name globospora derives from its spherical ("globose") spores, which measure 5–6 μm.
