= Clavaria pampaeana =

Scientific classification
- Domain: Eukaryota
- Kingdom: Fungi
- Division: Basidiomycota
- Class: Agaricomycetes
- Order: Agaricales
- Family: Clavariaceae
- Genus: Clavaria
- Species: C. pampaeana

Binomial name
- Clavaria pampaeana Speg. (1881)

Synonyms
- Clavaria acuta

Species of fungus

Clavaria pampaeana is a species of fungus belonging to the family Clavariaceae. Growing in open soil, it is shaped like a small white club, growing in scattered groups or sometimes fused. The stem may appear translucent near the base.

Clavaria vermicularis is similar but usually larger.
