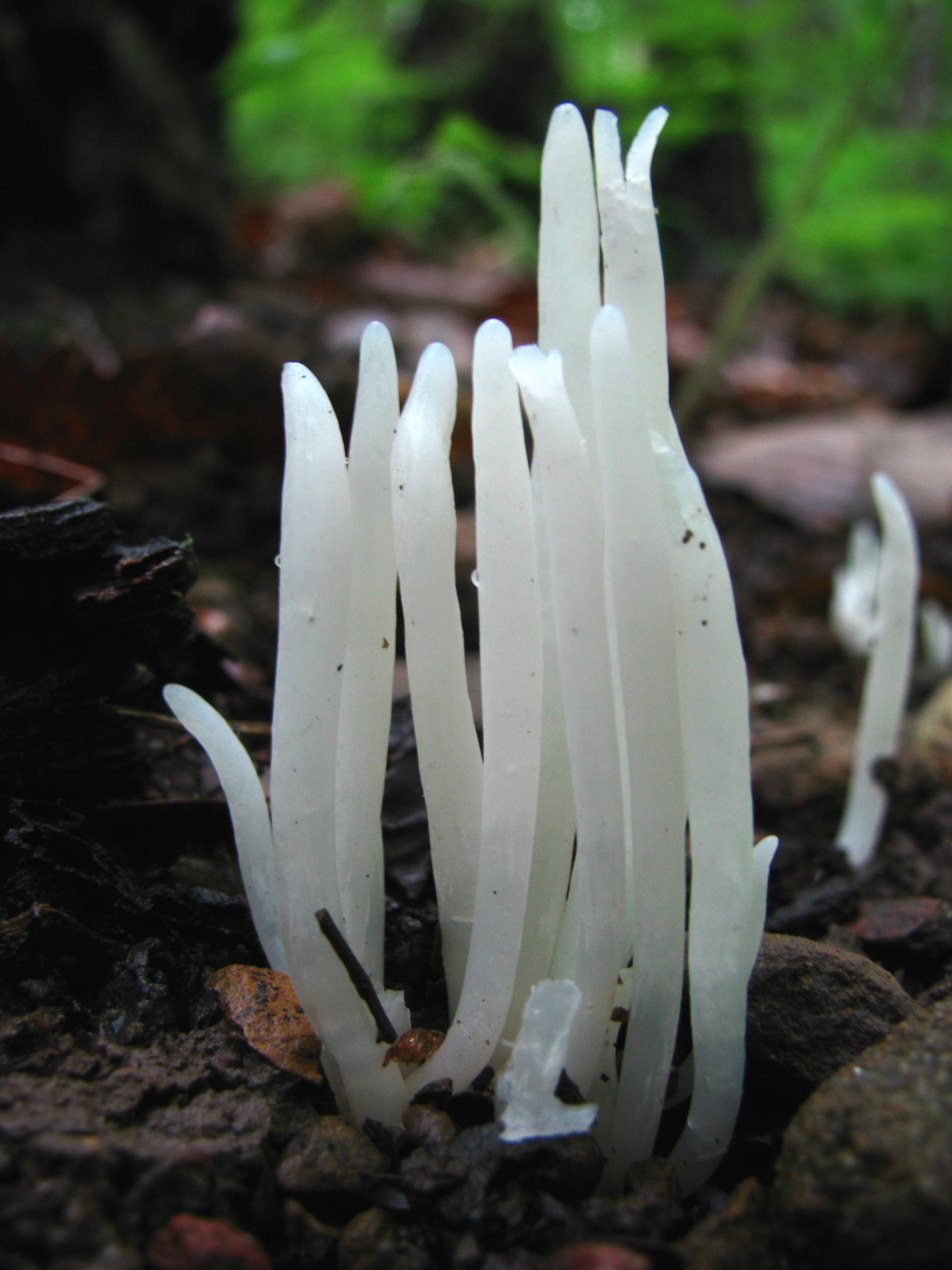

Scientific classification
- Kingdom: Fungi
- Division: Basidiomycota
- Class: Agaricomycetes
- Order: Agaricales
- Family: Clavariaceae
- Genus: Clavaria
- Species: C. fragilis

Binomial name
- Clavaria fragilis Holmsk. (1790)

Synonyms
- Species synonymy: 1790 Clavaria cylindrica Bull.; 1792 Clavaria glabra J.F. Gmel.; 1801 Clavaria eburnea Pers.; 1801 Clavaria eburnea var. fragilis (Holmsk.) Pers.; 1811 Clavaria vermicularis Sw.; 1818 Clavaria alba Pers.; 1821 Xylaria albicans var. cylindrica (Bull.) Gray; 1821 Clavaria solida Gray; 1822 Clavaria vermiculata var. flexuosa Pers.; 1822 Clavaria pistilliforme Pers.; 1887 Clavaria gracilior Britzelm.; 1879 Clavaria corynoides Peck; 1882 Clavaria simplex P. Karst.; 1891 Clavaria muelleri Berk. ex Cooke; 1901 Clavaria nivea Quél.; 1967 Multiclavula corynoides (Peck) R.H. Petersen; 1970 Clavulinopsis corynoides (Peck) Corner

= Clavaria fragilis =

Species of fungus

Clavaria fragilis Mycological characteristics
- Smooth hymenium
- No distinct cap
- Hymenium attachment is irregular or not applicable
- Stipe is bare
- Spore print is white
- Ecology is saprotrophic
- Edibility is edible

Clavaria fragilis, commonly known as fairy fingers, white worm coral, or white spindles, is a species of fungus in the family Clavariaceae. It is synonymous with Clavaria vermicularis. The fungus is the type species of the genus Clavaria and is a typical member of the clavarioid or club fungi. It produces tubular, unbranched, white basidiocarps (fruit bodies) that typically grow in clusters. The fruit bodies can reach dimensions of 15 cm (6 in) tall by 0.5 cm (1/4 in) thick. There are several similar coral-like fungi.

Clavaria fragilis is a saprobic species, growing in woodland litter or in old, unimproved grassland. It is widespread throughout temperate regions in the Northern Hemisphere, but has also been reported from Australia and South Africa. The fungus is edible, but insubstantial and flavorless.

== Taxonomy ==
Clavaria fragilis was originally described from Denmark in 1790 by Danish naturalist and mycologist Theodor Holmskjold, and was sanctioned under this name by Elias Magnus Fries in his 1821 Systema Mycologicum. The Latin epithet fragilis refers to the brittle fruit bodies. The species was redescribed by Swedish mycologist Olof Swartz in 1811, using the name Clavaria vermicularis (the epithet meaning "wormlike"). Though it is a later synonym—and thus obsolete according to the principle of priority—the latter name is still frequently used today. There are several other names considered to be synonymous with C. fragilis by the online taxonomical database MycoBank (see the taxobox).

In North America, the fungus has colloquially been called "fairy fingers" or "white worm coral". In the UK its recommended English name is "white spindles". British naturalist Samuel Frederick Gray called it the "worm club-stool" in his 1821 A Natural Arrangement of British Plants.

== Description ==
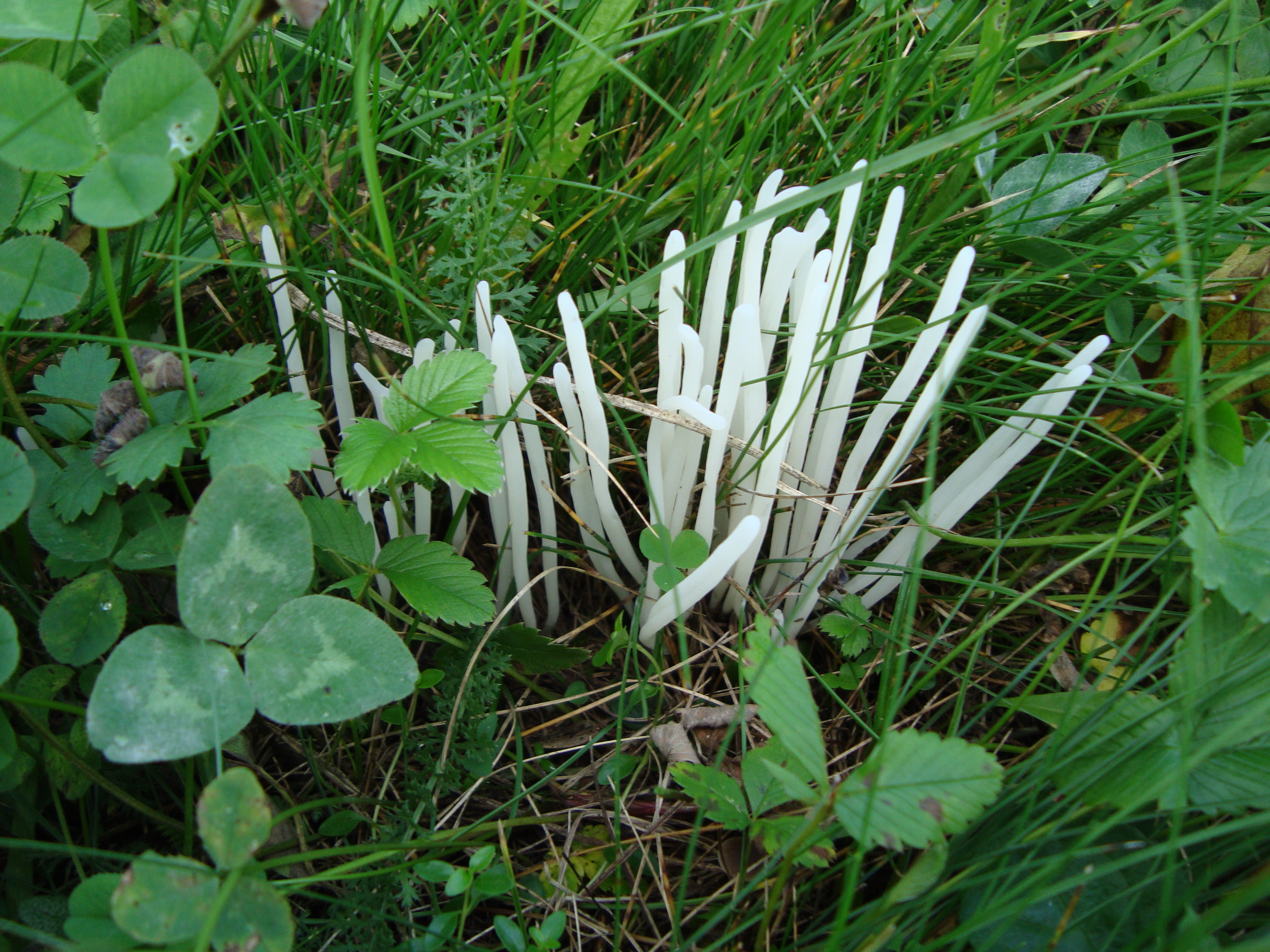
The fruit bodies usually grow in clusters.

The fruit bodies of are irregularly tubular, smooth to furrowed, sometimes compressed, very fragile, white, and up to 15 cm (6 in) tall by 7 mm (1/4 in) thick. They typically grow in dense clusters. The tip of the fruit body tapers to a point, and may yellow and curve with age. There is no distinct stalk, although it is evident as a short, semitransparent zone of tissue at the base of the club. Microscopically, the hyphae of the flesh are swollen up to 12 μm wide and lack clamp connections. The spores are smooth, colourless, ellipsoid to oblong, measuring 5–7 by 3–4 μm. The spores are white in deposit. The basidia (spore bearing cells) measure 40–50 by 6–8 μm, and lack clamps at their bases.

=== Similar species ===
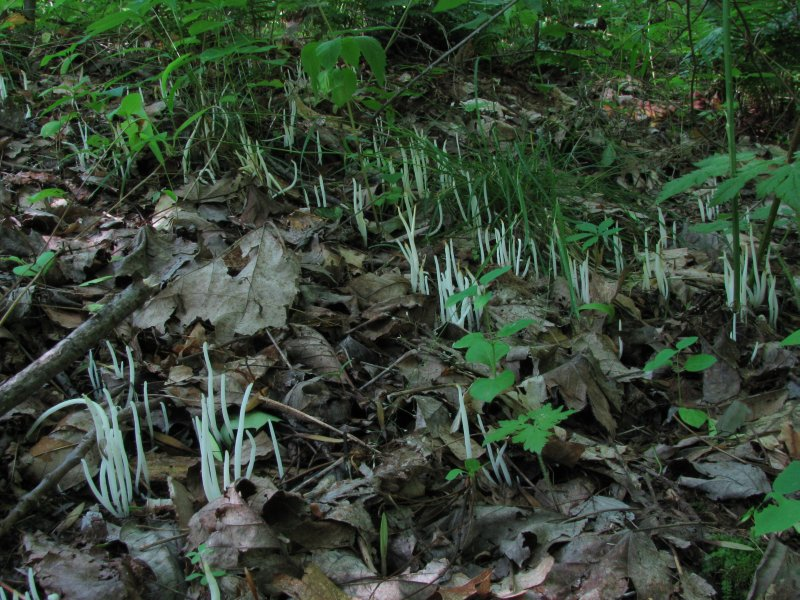
Typical growth habit

Similar fungi with simple, white fruit bodies include Clavaria acuta, an equally widespread species that typically grows singly or in small groups rather than in dense clusters and can be distinguished microscopically by its clamped basidia and larger spores; the morphologically similar, but rare C. atkinsoniana, found in the southwestern and central United States, which cannot be distinguished from C. fragilis by field characteristics alone but has larger spores—8.5–10 by 4.5–5 μm; C. rubicundula, another North American species, which is similar in stature but has a reddish tint; and Multiclavula mucida, a widespread lichenized species with smaller fruit bodies that occurs with its associated algae on moist wood.

Other similar species include Alloclavaria purpurea, Clavulinopsis fusiformis, C. laeticolor, and Macrotyphula juncea.

== Distribution and habitat ==
The species occurs throughout the Northern Hemisphere, in Europe (from July to October), Asia, and North America. In North America, it is more common east of the Rocky Mountains. It has also been recorded from Australia and South Africa. In 2006, it was reported from the Arctic zone of the Ural Mountains, in Russia.

The fungus grows in woodland and in grassland on moist soil, and is presumed to be saprobic, rotting fallen leaf litter and dead grass stems. The fruit bodies tend to grow in groups, tufts or clusters. Although they can grow singly, they are typically inconspicuous unless in clusters.

== Conservation status ==
In North America, C. fragilis has been called "by far our most common Clavaria". In northern Europe, it is one of a suite of "CHEG" fungi (CHEG standing for "Clavarioid fungi-Hygrocybe-Entoloma-Geoglossaceae") considered to be indicator species of old, unimproved grassland (permanent grassland that has not been cultivated for some years). Though such grasslands are a threatened habitat in Europe, C. fragilis is one of the commoner CHEG species. It is, nonetheless, on the national red list of threatened fungi in the Netherlands and Slovenia.

== Edibility ==
Clavaria fragilis is nonpoisonous and reportedly edible raw or cooked, but the fruit bodies are insubstantial and fragile. One field guide says "its flesh is tasteless and so delicate that it seems to dissolve in one's mouth." Its odor has been compared to iodine.
