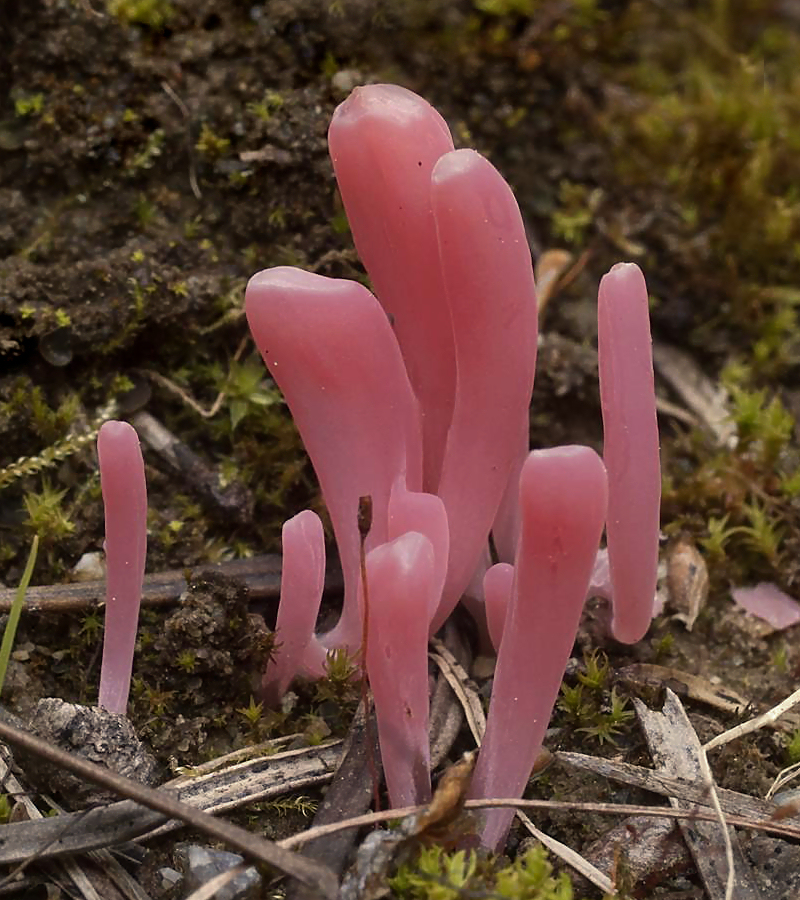

Scientific classification
- Domain: Eukaryota
- Kingdom: Fungi
- Division: Basidiomycota
- Class: Agaricomycetes
- Order: Agaricales
- Family: Clavariaceae
- Genus: Clavaria
- Species: C. rosea

Binomial name
- Clavaria rosea Dalman (1811)

= Clavaria rosea =

Species of fungus

Clavaria rosea is a species of coral fungus in the family Clavariaceae. It has coral-like fruit bodies with "arms" up to 4 cm (1.6 inches) high and 3 mm (0.12 in) thick. The arms are smooth, unbranched, pink, and have rounded tips. The stem is up to 1.1 cm (0.43 in) long and 2 mm (0.08 in) thick, and black. The spores are smooth, hyaline (translucent), inamyloid, pip-shaped, and measure 7–10 by 2–3 μm. Described in 1811 by Swedish physician and naturalist Johan Wilhelm Dalman, the species is found in Asia, Europe, and North America, where it grows singly on the ground in mixed forests.
