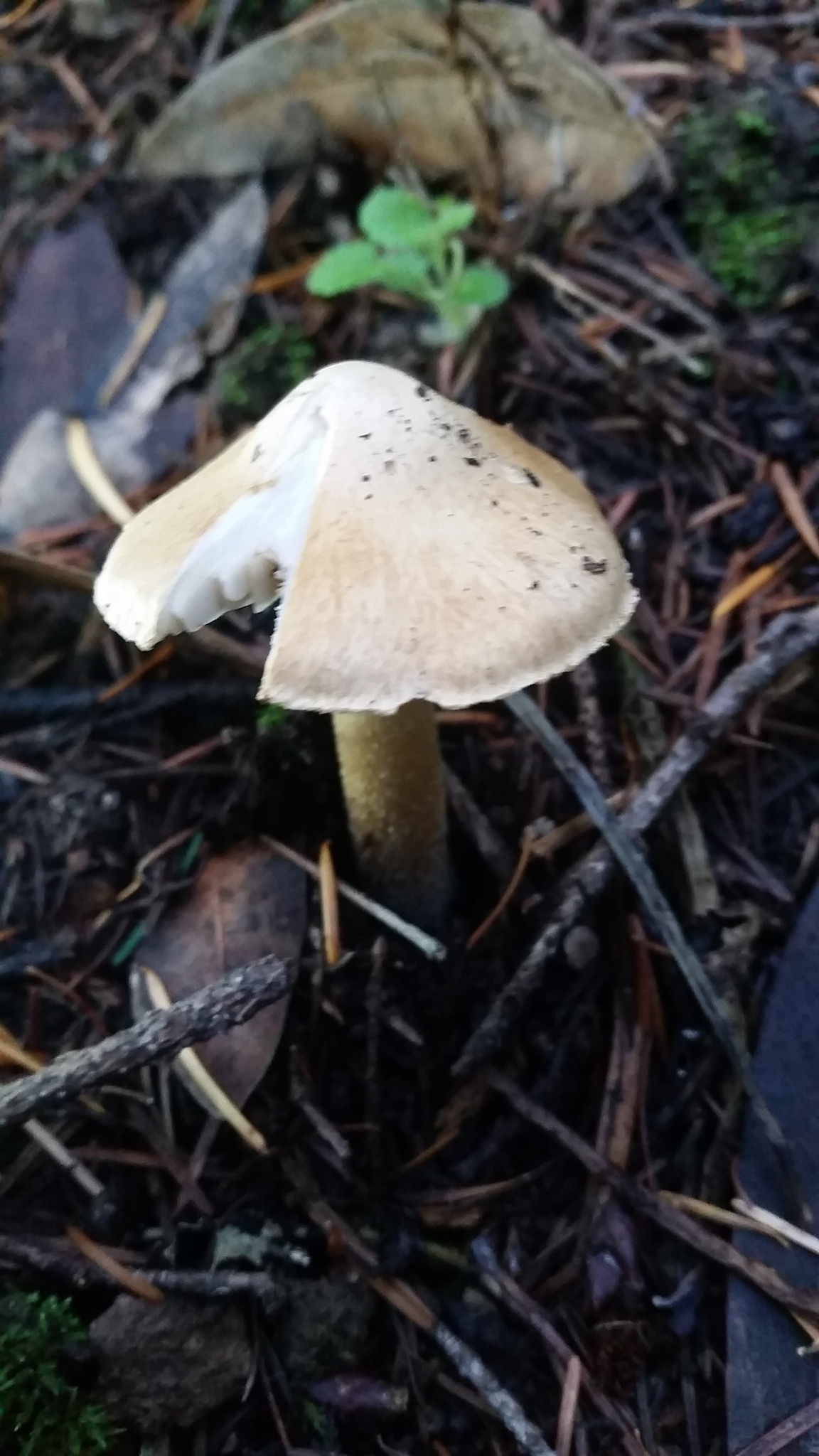

Scientific classification
- Kingdom: Fungi
- Division: Basidiomycota
- Class: Agaricomycetes
- Order: Agaricales
- Family: Inocybaceae
- Genus: Pseudosperma
- Species: P. sororium

Binomial name
- Pseudosperma sororium (Kauffman) Matheny & Esteve-Rav

Synonyms
- Inocybe sororia Kauffman

= Pseudosperma sororium =

Species of fungus

Pseudosperma sororium Mycological characteristics
- Gills on hymenium
- Cap is conical or umbonate
- Hymenium is adnate or free
- Stipe has a cortina
- Spore print is brown
- Ecology is mycorrhizal
- Edibility is poisonous

Pseudosperma sororium, commonly known as the corn-silk fiberhead, is a species of mushroom in the family Inocybaceae. It is poisonous, has a fibrillose cap, and grows under both hardwood and conifer trees.

== Taxonomy ==
Pseudosperma sororium was first described in 1924 by Calvin Henry Kauffman as Inocybe sororia. It kept that name for a very long time. In 2020, Matheny et al. split the genus Inocybe into several other genera, including Pseudosperma. Inocybe sororia was renamed Pseudosperma sororium and became the type species of Pseudosperma.

== Description ==
The cap of Pseudosperma sororium is about 3.5-11 centimeters in diameter. It starts out conical, and becomes umbonate in age. It is yellowish brown or straw-colored and very fibrillose. When the mushroom is older, the cap begins to split. At this stage, it can resemble straw. The stipe is about 6-12 centimeters long and 1-2 centimeters wide, and has a slightly wider base. A cortina is present. The gills start out pale, becoming darker and eventually brownish in age. They can be sinuate, adnexed, adnate, or free. The spore print is brownish. This mushroom smells like green corn.

== Habitat and ecology ==
Pseudosperma sororium grows in forests, where it is found under both hardwoods and conifers. It fruits during fall and winter.

== Toxicity ==
Pseudosperma sororium is poisonous, containing the toxin muscarine.
