= Cortinarius substriatus =

Scientific classification
- Kingdom: Fungi
- Division: Basidiomycota
- Class: Agaricomycetes
- Order: Agaricales
- Family: Cortinariaceae
- Genus: Cortinarius
- Species: C. substriatus

Binomial name
- Cortinarius substriatus Kauffman

Species of fungus

Cortinarius substriatus Mycological characteristics
- Gills on hymenium
- Cap is conical or convex
- Hymenium is adnate
- Stipe has a cortina
- Ecology is mycorrhizal
- Edibility is unknown

Cortinarius substriatus is a species of mushroom in the family Cortinariaceae. It is found in the Pacific Northwest.

== Description ==
The cap of Cortinarius substriatus is grayish or brownish in color and slimy when wet. It is conical to convex and about 3.8-5.2 centimeters in diameter. The stipe is about 5-12 centimeters long and 0.7-1.5 centimeters wide. It is purplish to whitish and becomes dingy in older specimens. The gills start out pale, before becoming brown as the mushroom gets older. They can be adnate or notched.

== Habitat and ecology ==
Cortinarius substriatus is found under hemlock and other conifers. It is found in forests.
