= Heinrich Zollinger =

Swiss botanist (1818–1859)

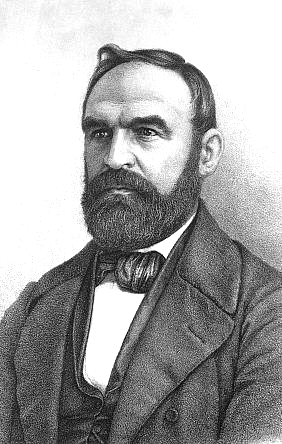
- Born: 22 March 1818; Feuerthalen
- Died: 19 May 1859 (aged 41); Kandangan, Senduro, Lumajang Regency
- Education: University of Geneva
- Scientific career
- Fields: Botanist
- Author abbrev. (botany): Zoll.

Heinrich Zollinger (22 March 1818 – 19 May 1859) was a Swiss botanist.

== Biography ==
Heinrich Zollinger was born in Feuerthalen, Switzerland.

From 1837 to 1838, Zollinger studied botany at the University of Geneva under Augustin and Alphonse Pyramus de Candolle, but had to interrupt his studies due to financial problems.

In 1842, he moved to Java, working in a botanical garden, and on small government-financed scientific expeditions. He returned to Switzerland in 1848, but came back to Java in 1855 with his wife and two children. At that time he was employed by a Dutch-Indian company which planned to plant coconut trees in the region.

In 1857, Zollinger proposed recognizing Malesia as a distinct floristic region, an idea later taken up by Cornelius G.G.J. van Steenis.

The species Clavaria zollingeri described scientifically by French mycologist Joseph-Henri Léveillé in 1846 was named after Heinrich Zollinger, who researched the genus Clavaria, and collected the type specimen in Java.

== Death and legacy ==
Zollinger died in Kandangan, a village located in the eastern part of Mount Bromo Tengger in East Java, Indonesia. He had been suffering from the long-term effects of malaria.

With support of Alexander Moritzi Zollinger issued and sold two series of specimens which superficially resemble exsiccatae, namely Plantae Javanicae 1843–1847 and Plantae Japonicae 1847. Plant specimens collected by Zollinger in Java and Bali (in 1855 and later) were edited and published by Rudolph Friedrich Hohenacker under the title Zollinger pl. Javae et Bali. Ed. Hohenacker.

Specimens collected by Zollinger are cared for at a number of major herbaria, among others Plantentuin Meise, National Herbarium of Victoria, Royal Botanic Gardens Victoria, Kew Herbarium and Botanische Staatssammlung München.

A bust of Zollinger stands in Zurich's Old Botanical Garden.
