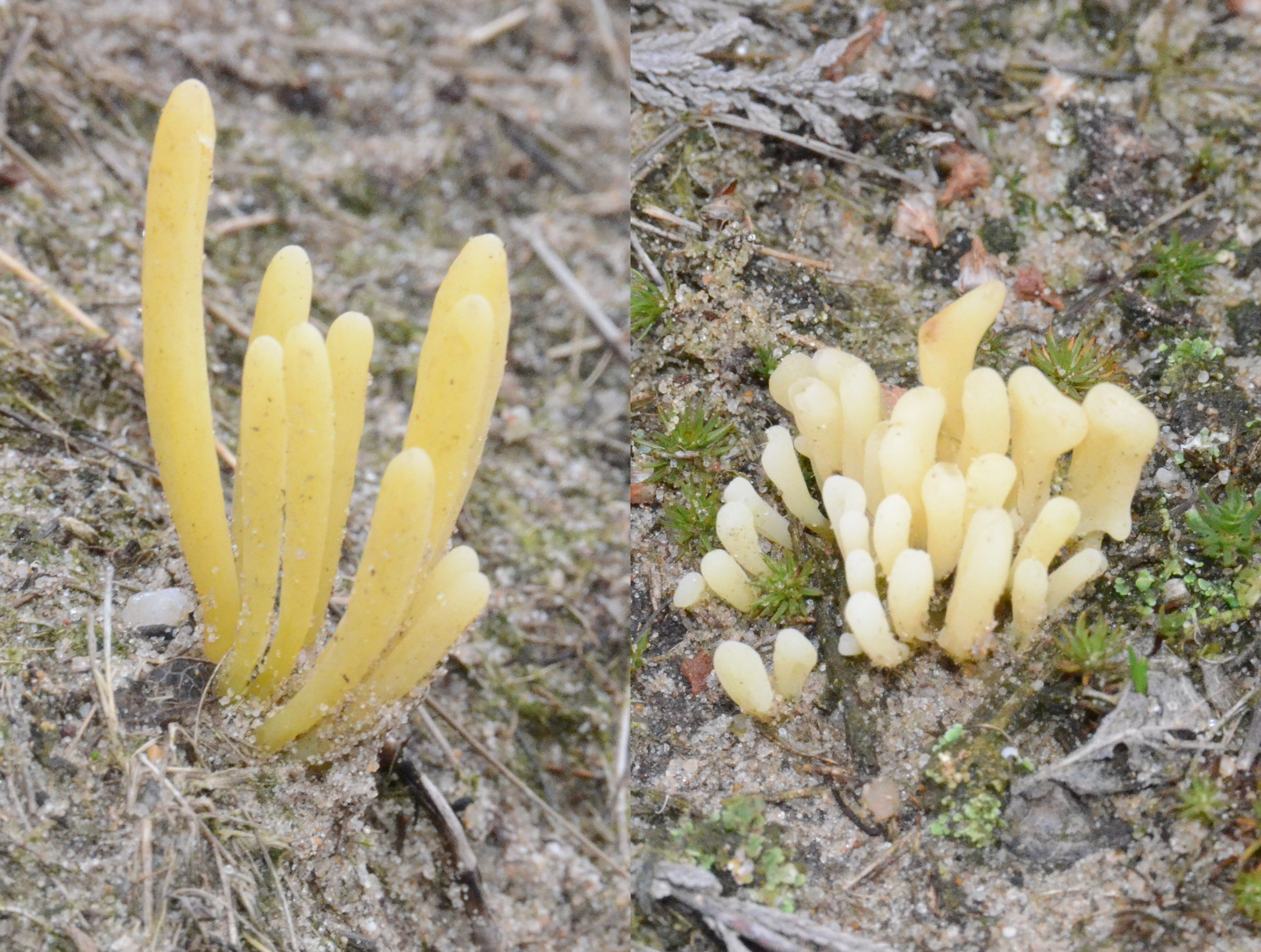
- Clavaria argillacea found at Hoge Veluwe National Park

Scientific classification
- Domain: Eukaryota
- Kingdom: Fungi
- Division: Basidiomycota
- Class: Agaricomycetes
- Order: Agaricales
- Family: Clavariaceae
- Genus: Clavaria
- Species: C. argillacea

Binomial name
- Clavaria argillacea Pers.

= Clavaria argillacea =

Species of fungus

Clavaria argillacea is a species of fungus in the family Clavariaceae.

It grows 2–8 millimetres (1/16–5/16 in) across and up to 8 centimetres (3 1/4 in) tall.

It can be found in Europe growing near moss on sandy heaths from August to September.

It is edible raw or cooked, and can be preserved in oil.

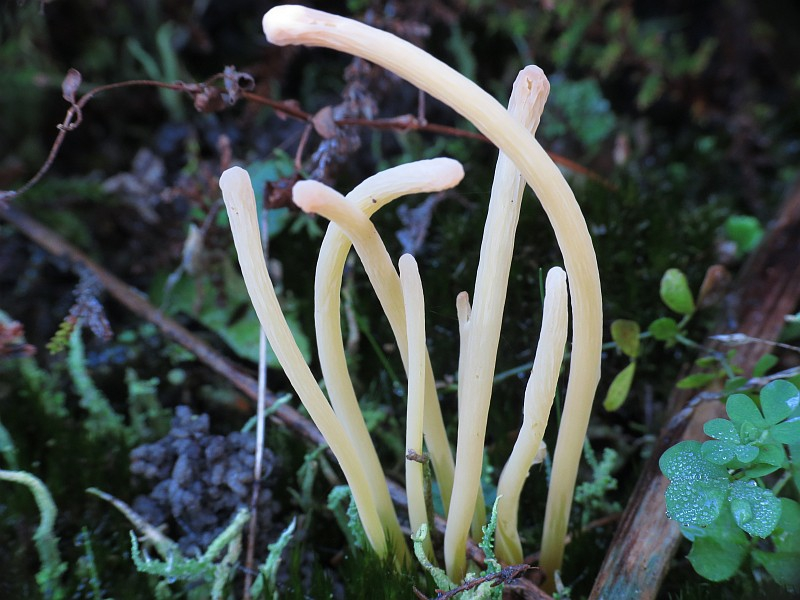
Specimen found in Campine, the Netherlands
