= Clavaria versatilis =

Scientific classification
- Domain: Eukaryota
- Kingdom: Fungi
- Division: Basidiomycota
- Class: Agaricomycetes
- Order: Agaricales
- Family: Clavariaceae
- Genus: Clavaria
- Species: C. versatilis

Binomial name
- Clavaria versatilis (Quél.) Sacc. & Trotter (1912)

Synonyms
- Ramaria versatilis Quél. (1893); Clavariella versatilis (Quél.) Maire (1914); Ramaria versatilis var. latispora R.H.Petersen (1988)

Species of fungus

Clavaria versatilis is a species of coral fungus in the family Clavariaceae. It was first described scientifically by French mycologist Lucien Quélet in 1893 as a species of Ramaria. Pier Andrea Saccardo and Alessandro Trotter transferred it to the genus Clavaria in 1912.
