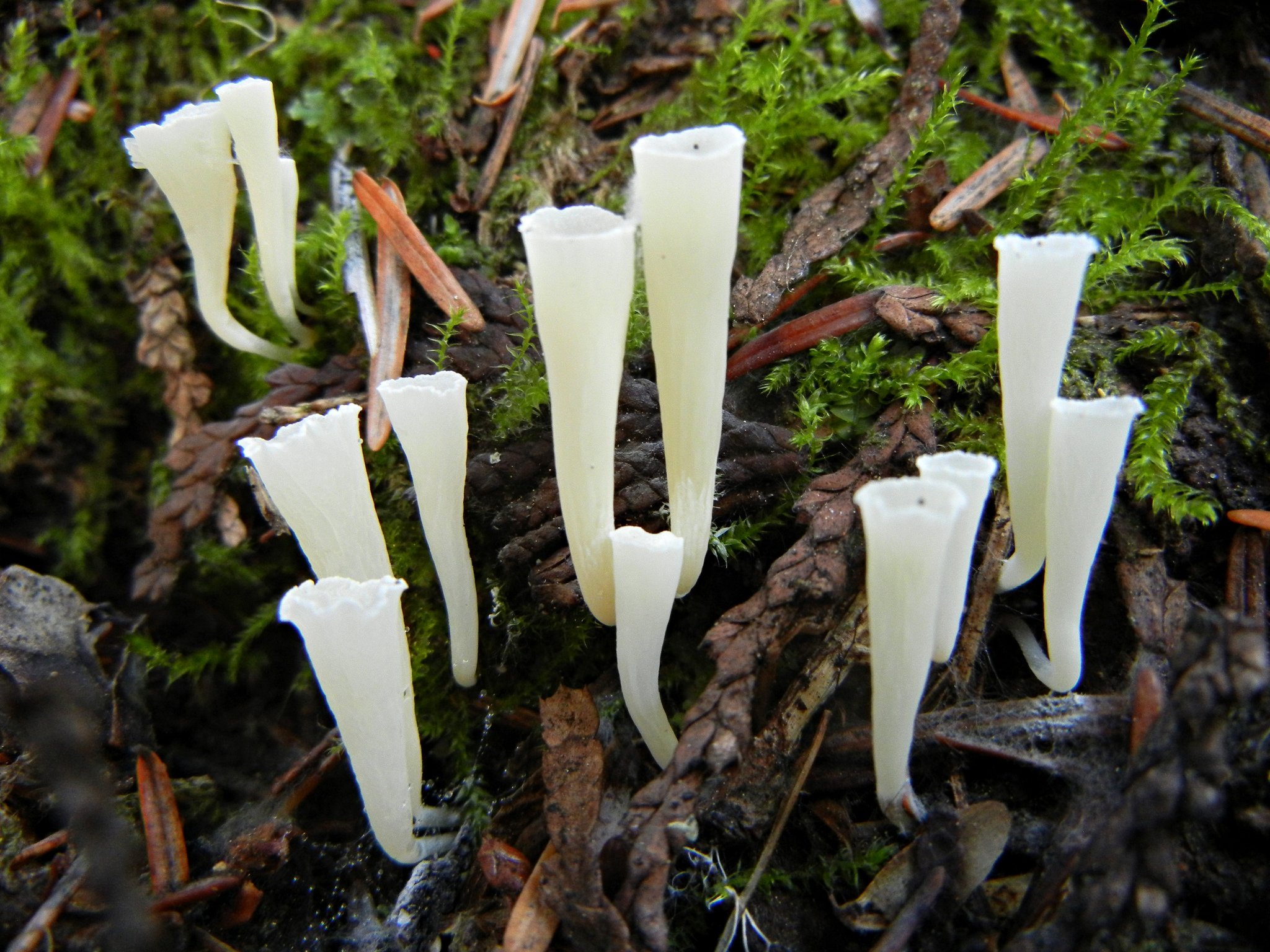
- Clavicorona taxophila

Scientific classification
- Kingdom: Fungi
- Division: Basidiomycota
- Class: Agaricomycetes
- Order: Agaricales
- Family: Clavariaceae
- Genus: Clavicorona; Doty (1947)

Type species
- Clavicorona taxophila (Thom) Doty (1947)

= Clavicorona =

Genus of fungi

Clavicorona is a fungal genus in the family Clavariaceae. The genus was circumscribed by Maxwell Stanford Doty in 1947, who included the species C. pyxidata, C. cristata, C. taxophila, and C. candelabrum.

Fungi of this genus have been recorded as occasional food of the pleasing fungus beetle Dacne quadrimaculata.

== Species ==
E.J.H.Corner added another five species in 1950: C. candelabrum, C. colensoi, C. javanica, C. mairei, and C. tuba. He included C. dichotoma in 1970. In his 1972 revision of the genus, James Dodd listed 11 species, but most of these have since been transferred to other genera, particularly Artomyces.

As of March 2024, Species Fungorum (in the Catalogue of Life) accepts seven species of Clavicorona:

- Clavicorona amazonensis Corner (1970)
- Clavicorona brunnea Corner (1970)
- Clavicorona geoglossoides Corner (1970)
- Clavicorona gracilis (Corner) Corner (1970)
- Clavicorona mairei (Battetta) Corner (1950)
- Clavicorona subechinulata Gardezi (2005)
- Clavicorona taxophila (Thom) Doty (1947)
