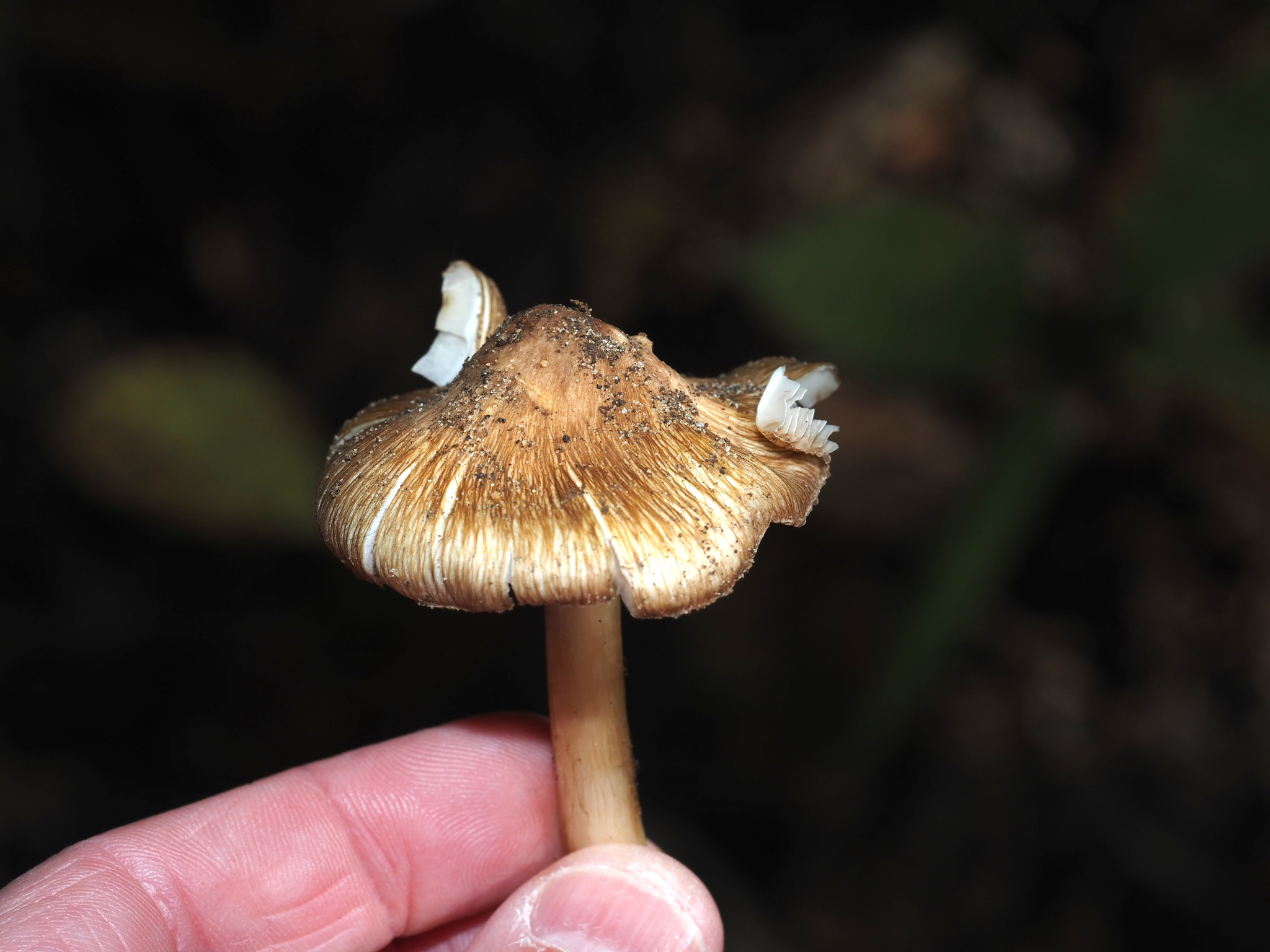

Scientific classification
- Kingdom: Fungi
- Division: Basidiomycota
- Class: Agaricomycetes
- Order: Agaricales
- Family: Inocybaceae
- Genus: Pseudosperma; Matheny & Esteve-Rav

Type species
- Pseudosperma sororium

= Pseudosperma =

Genus of mushrooms

Pseudosperma is a genus of mushrooms in the family Inocybaceae. It is widely distributed, being found in both temperate and tropical regions.

Pseudosperma was once considered to be part of the genus Inocybe. However, in 2020, Matheny et al. split the genus into several other genera, including Pseudosperma.
