= Ceratellopsis =

Scientific classification
- Kingdom: Fungi
- Division: Basidiomycota
- Class: Agaricomycetes
- Order: Agaricales
- Family: Clavariaceae
- Genus: Ceratellopsis; Konrad & Maubl. (1826)

Type species
- Ceratellopsis acuminata (proposed) (Fuckel) Corner (1950)

Species
- Ceratellopsis aculeata

Family of fungi

Ceratellopsis is a genus of fungi in the family Clavariaceae. Basidiocarps (fruit bodies) grow gregariously on fallen wood, bark, and decaying plant material and are clavarioid, simple, small (under 2 mm tall), with an acute apex. Only two species are currently recognized; other species formerly placed in Ceratellopsis have been transferred to other genera or are nomina dubia.
