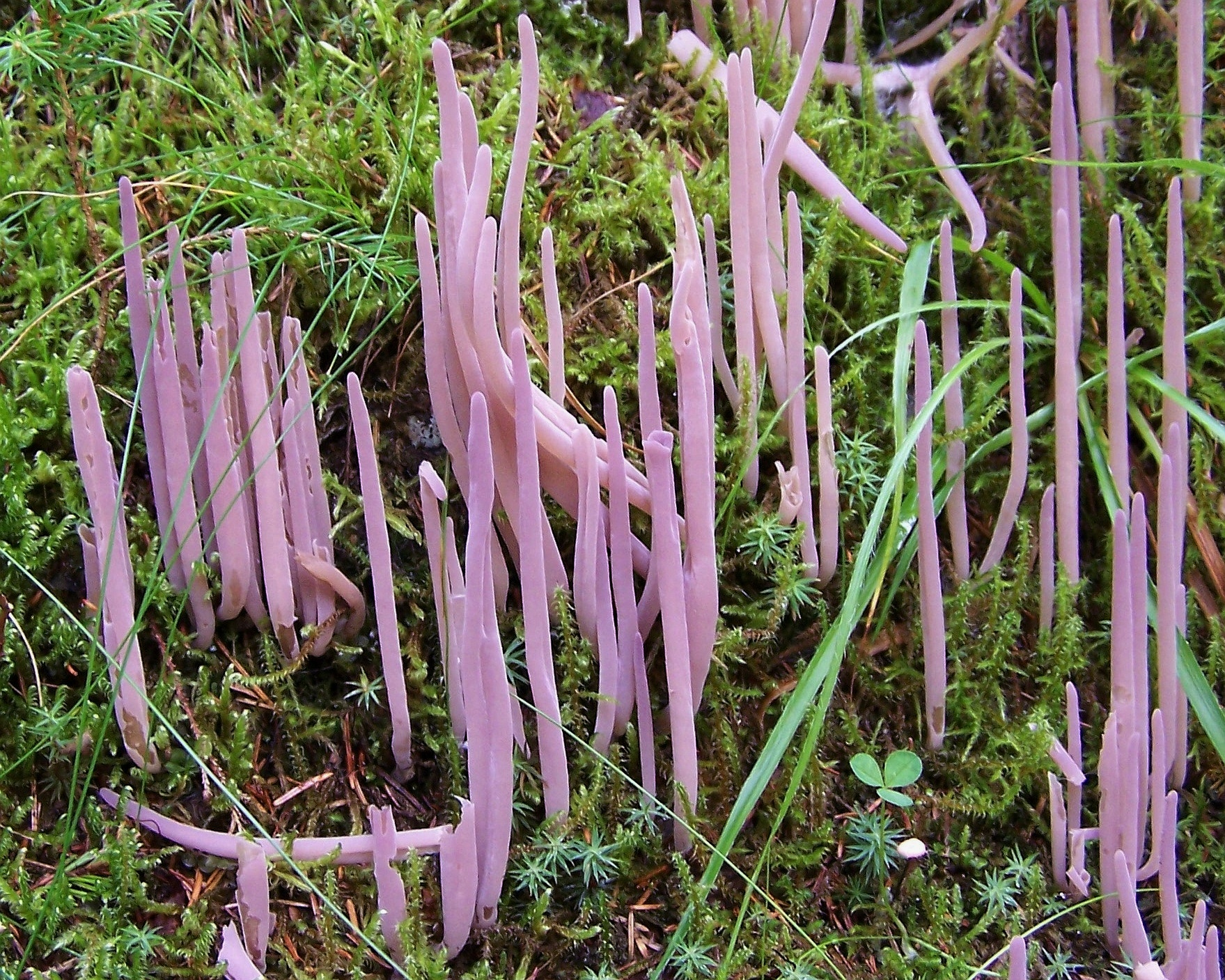

Scientific classification
- Kingdom: Fungi
- Division: Basidiomycota
- Class: Agaricomycetes
- Order: Hymenochaetales
- Family: Repetobasidiaceae
- Genus: Alloclavaria
- Species: A. purpurea

Binomial name
- Alloclavaria purpurea (Fr.) Dentinger & D.J.McLaughlin (2007)

Synonyms
- Clavaria purpurea Fr. (1821)

= Alloclavaria purpurea =

Alloclavaria purpurea
- Mycological characteristics
- Smooth hymenium
- No distinct cap
- Hymenium attachment is irregular or not applicable
- Stipe is bare
- Spore print is white
- Ecology is saprotrophic
- Edibility is edible

Alloclavaria purpurea is a coral fungus commonly known as the purple fairy club or purple coral.

== Taxonomy ==
Formerly known as Clavaria purpurea, it has been moved to its own genus as a result of phylogenetic analysis.

== Description ==
The fruiting body comprises numerous slender cylindrical spindles that may grow to a height of 12 centimetres (4 3/4 in), with individual spindles being 2–6 millimeters thick. The color is purple or lavender, although the color fades to tan in older specimens. A white mycelium is present at the base. The spore print is white.

Similar species include Clavaria fumosa and C. zollingeri.

== Distribution and habitat ==
Fruit bodies are found in spruce-fir forests. It can be found from October to December on the West Coast of North America, and July–October further inland.

== Uses ==
It is reportedly edible but insubstantial.
