= Hyphodontiella =

Scientific classification
- Kingdom: Fungi
- Division: Basidiomycota
- Class: Agaricomycetes
- Order: Agaricales
- Family: Clavariaceae
- Genus: Hyphodontiella; Å.Strid (1975)

Type species
- Hyphodontiella multiseptata Å.Strid (1975)

Species
- H. hauerslevii H. multiseptata

Genus of fungi

Hyphodontiella is a genus of two species of wood-inhabiting corticioid fungi. The genus contains two species found in Nordic countries. Hyphodontiella was circumscribed by Swedish mycologist Åke Strid in 1975. Originally classified in the family Corticiaceae along with most other corticioid fungi, it was moved to the Clavariaceae in 2007 .

== See also ==
- List of Agaricales genera
