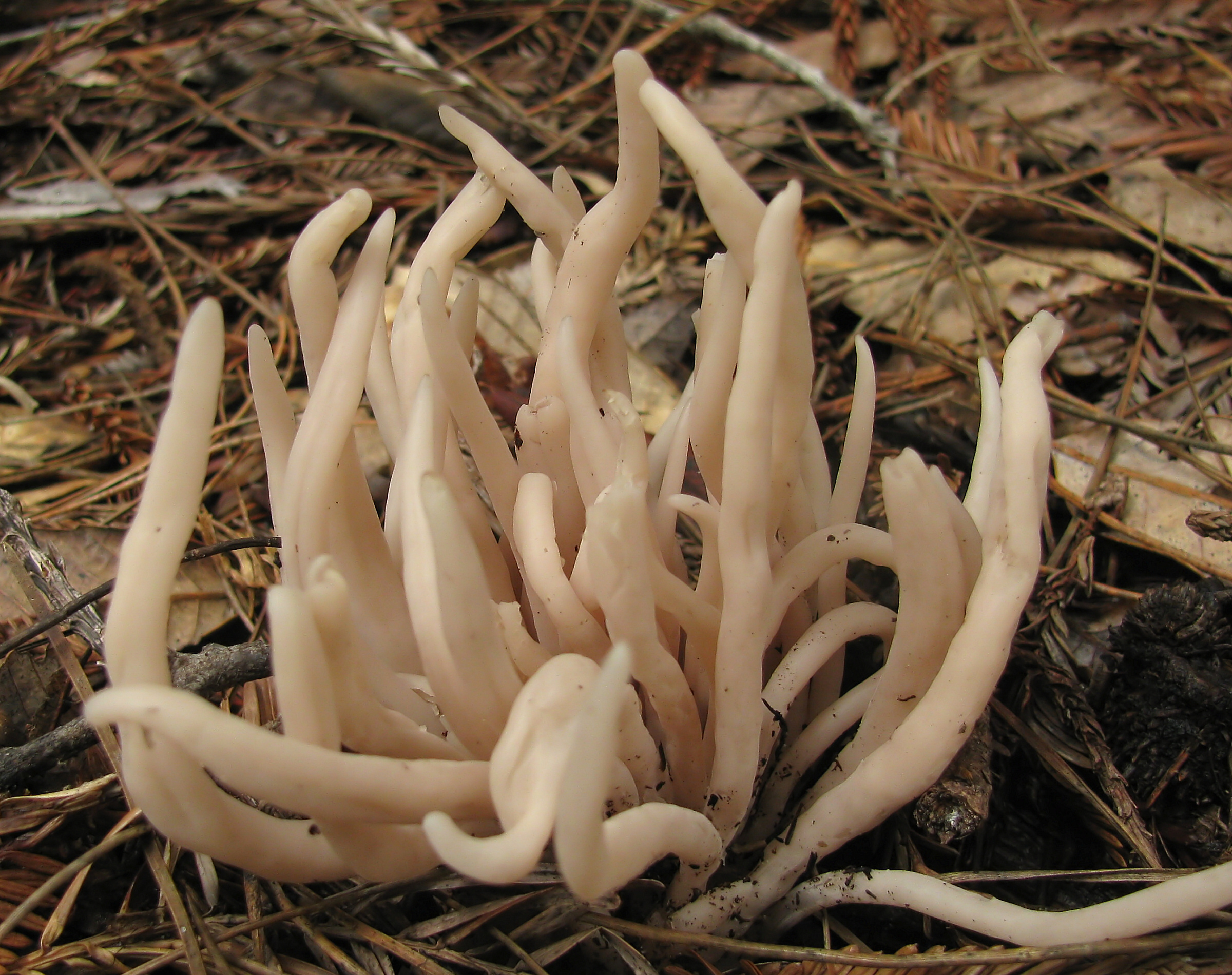

Scientific classification
- Kingdom: Fungi
- Division: Basidiomycota
- Class: Agaricomycetes
- Order: Agaricales
- Family: Clavariaceae
- Genus: Clavaria
- Species: C. fumosa

Binomial name
- Clavaria fumosa Pers. (1795)

= Clavaria fumosa =

Species of fungus

Clavaria fumosa
- Mycological characteristics
- Smooth hymenium
- No distinct cap
- Hymenium attachment is irregular or not applicable
- Stipe is bare
- Spore print is white
- Ecology is saprotrophic
- Edibility is edible or inedible

Clavaria fumosa, commonly known as the grayish fairy club, smoky clavaria or smoky spindles, is a species of coral fungus in the family Clavariaceae.

== Taxonomy ==
The species was originally described by Christian Hendrik Persoon in 1795.

The generic name is derived from the Latin clava meaning "club" while the specific epithet fumosa means "smoky".

== Description ==
The fruiting body is 2–14 centimetres (3/4–5 1/2 in) tall and 2–7 millimetres (1/16–1/4 in) wide. These bodies are to a greater or lesser extent cylindrical, taper at the base and are normally unbranched, they are infrequently flattened or have grooves and are usually smooth. They can be dry or moist are normally rather brittle with a blunt tip. The colour can be greyish, off-white, dirty yellowish, or dirty pinkish, although they are paler at the base while the tip becomes darker reddish brown or even black as it ages. The flesh is the same colour as the exterior and does not have a distinct odour or taste while the spores are white.

== Distribution ==
Clavaria fumosa is a common species in Britain and Ireland and is also widely distributed mainland Europe and also from North America.

== Habitat and biology ==
Clavaria fumosa is a saprobic fungus which grows on the soil among unimproved grassland and in leaf litter along the edges of woodland, it is less common in dense woodland. This species is normally found in clusters and solitary specimens are rare. In Britain and Ireland the fruiting bodies appear from June to November.

== Edibility ==
The species is said to be edible, but as a relatively scarce and small species then their collection for culinary uses is not thought to be worthwhile. Others consider it to be inedible.
