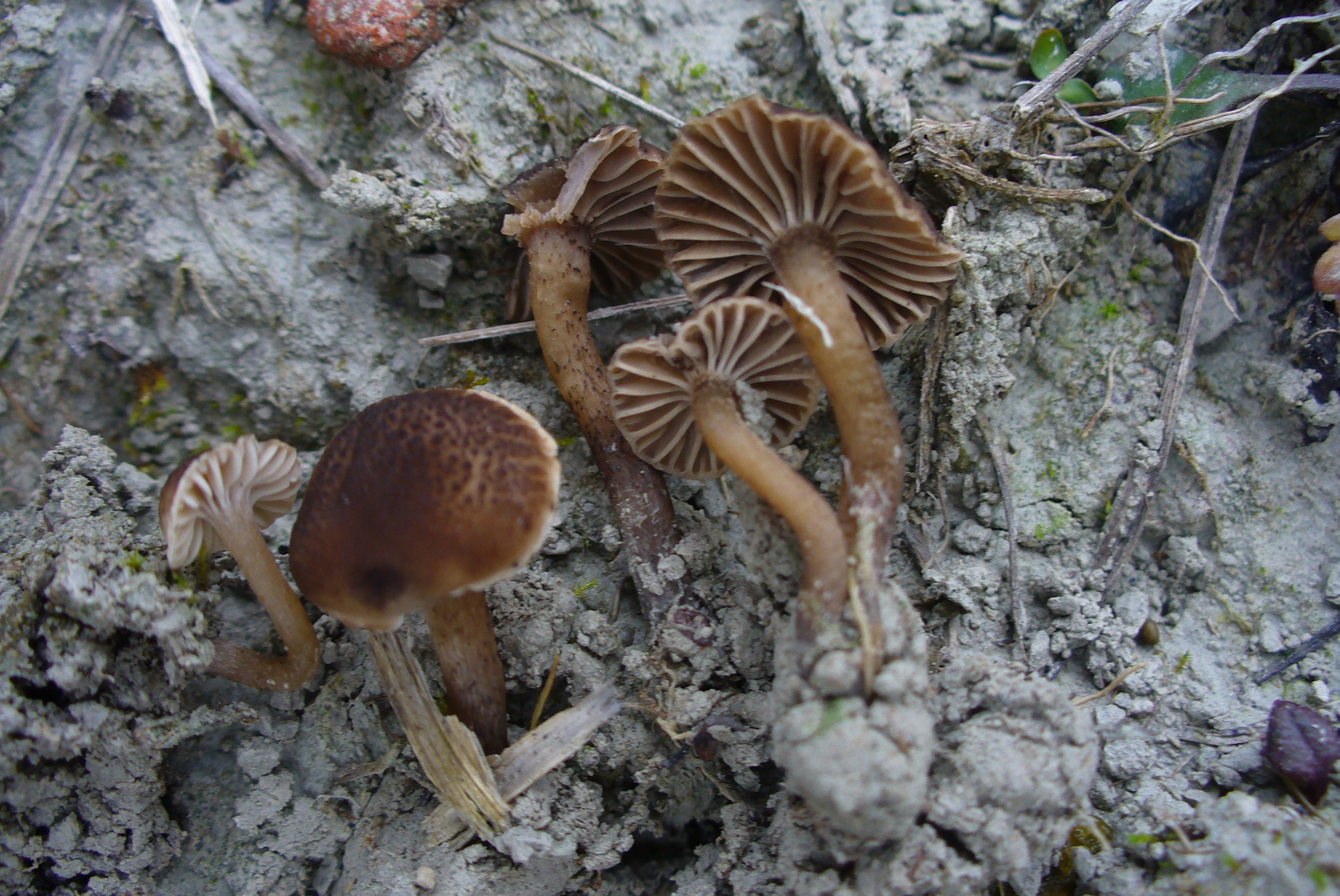
- Hodophilus atropunctus, Germany

Scientific classification
- Kingdom: Fungi
- Division: Basidiomycota
- Class: Agaricomycetes
- Order: Agaricales
- Family: Clavariaceae
- Genus: Hodophilus; R. Heim (1958)

Type species
- Hodophilus foetens (W. Phillips) Birkebak & Adamčík (2016)

Species
- see text

= Hodophilus =

Genus of fungi

Hodophilus is a genus of agarics (gilled fungi) in the family Clavariaceae. Basidiocarps (fruit bodies) are dull-coloured and have dry caps, rather distant, decurrent lamellae, white spores, and smooth, ringless stems. In Europe species are characteristic of old, unimproved grasslands (termed waxcap grasslands) which are a declining habitat, making them of conservation concern. Several species have a distinct odour of naphthalene.

== Taxonomy ==
=== History ===
Hodophilus was described by French mycologist Roger Heim in 1957, but this was invalid because he did not include a Latin diagnosis for the genus, as was required by the rules of nomenclature at the time. The name Hodophilus was later (1958) validly published, but it was generally regarded as synonymous with the genus Camarophyllopsis.

=== Current status ===
Recent molecular research, based on cladistic analysis of DNA sequences, indicates that Hodophilus is monophyletic and forms a natural group distinct from Camarophyllopsis.

== Species ==
- Hodophilus albofloccipes (Kovalenko, E.F.Malysheva & O.V.Morozova) Looney & Adamčík 2016 – Russia
- Hodophilus atropunctus (Pers.) Birkebak & Adamčík 2016 - Europe
- Hodophilus cambriensis Adamčík & D.J. Harries 2018 - Europe
- Hodophilus carpathicus Jančovič. & Adamčík 2019 - Europe
- Hodophilus decurrentior Adamčík, Jančovič., Læssøe & Dima 2019 - Europe
- Hodophilus foetens (W.Phillips) Birkebak & Adamčík 2017 – Europe
- Hodophilus fuscofoetens S. Arauzo, P. Iglesias & J. Fernández Vicente 2018 - Europe
- Hodophilus glabripes Ming Zhang, C.Q. Wang & T.H. Li 2019 - China
- Hodophilus hesleri Adamčík, Birkebak & Looney 2016 - North America
- Hodophilus hymenocephalus (A.H.Sm. & Hesler) Birkebak & Adamčík 2016 - North America
- Hodophilus indicus K.N.A. Raj, K.P.D. Latha & Manim. 2017 - India
- Hodophilus micaceus (Berk. & Broome) Birkebak & Adamčík 2016 - Europe
- Hodophilus pallidus Adamčík, Jančovič. & Looney 2016 - Europe
- Hodophilus paupertinus (A.H.Sm. & Hesler) Adamčík, Birkebak & Looney 2016 - North America
- Hodophilus peckianus (Howe) Adamčík, Birkebak & Looney 2016 - North America
- Hodophilus phaeophyllus (Romagn.) Arauzo & Iglesias 2018 – Europe
- Hodophilus phaeoxanthus (Romagn.) Adamčík & Jančovič. 2018 – Europe
- Hodophilus praecox S. Arauzo 2018 - Europe
- Hodophilus rugulosus (A.H.Sm. & Hesler) Adamčík & Jančovič. 2018 - North America
- Hodophilus smithii Adamčík, Birkebak & Looney 2016 - North America
- Hodophilus stramineus Jančovič., Dima & Adamčík 2019 - Europe
- Hodophilus subfoetens Adamčík, Jančovič. & Looney 2016 - Europe
- Hodophilus subfuscescens (A.H.Sm. & Hesler) Adamčík, Birkebak & Looney 2016 = North America
- Hodophilus tenuicystidiatus Jančovič., Adamčík & Looney 2016 - Europe
- Hodophilus variabilipes Jančovičová, Adamčík & Looney 2017 - Europe

== See also ==
- List of Agaricales genera
