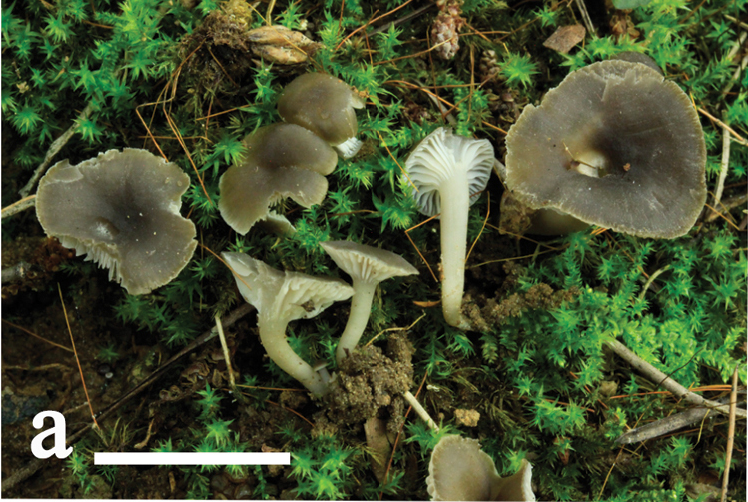
- Camarophyllopsis olivaceogrisea

Scientific classification
- Kingdom: Fungi
- Division: Basidiomycota
- Class: Agaricomycetes
- Order: Agaricales
- Family: Clavariaceae
- Genus: Camarophyllopsis; Herink (1958)

Type species
- Camarophyllopsis schulzeri (Bres.) Herink (1958)

Synonyms
- Hygrotrama Singer (1959)

= Camarophyllopsis =

Genus of fungi

Camarophyllopsis is a genus of agarics (gilled fungi) in the family Clavariaceae. Basidiocarps (fruit bodies) are dull-coloured and have dry caps, rather distant, decurrent lamellae, white spores, and smooth, ringless stems. In Europe species are characteristic of old, unimproved grasslands (termed waxcap grasslands) which are a declining habitat, making them of conservation concern.

== Taxonomy ==
=== History ===
Camarophyllopsis was circumscribed by Czech mycologist Josef Herink in 1958, with Camarophyllopsis schulzeri as the type and only species. Roger Heim had the year previously treated this group of species under the name Hodophilus, but this was invalid because he did not include a Latin diagnosis for the genus, as was required by the rules of nomenclature at the time. Rolf Singer published Hygrotrama in March 1959 (with type species Hygrotrama dennisianum), and the name Hodophilus (type species Hodophilus foetens) was validly published in 1958.

=== Current status ===
Previously placed in the family Hygrophoraceae based on its morphology, Camarophyllopsis was shown using molecular phylogenetics to belong in the Clavariaceae. Subsequent research has also shown that the genus Hodophilus is distinct and separate from Camarophyllopsis.

== Species ==
- Camarophyllopsis albipes (Singer) Boertm. 2002 – Mexico
- Camarophyllopsis araguensis (Singer) Boertm. 2002 – South America
- Camarophyllopsis atrovelutina (Romagn.) Argaud 2002 - Europe
- Camarophyllopsis deceptiva (A.H. Sm. & Hesler) Bon 1996 - North America
- Camarophyllopsis dennisiana (Singer) Arnolds 1986 - Mexico
- Camarophyllopsis hiemalis (Singer & Clémençon) Arnolds 1986 – Europe
- Camarophyllopsis lacunaris Bizio & Contu 2004 – Italy
- Camarophyllopsis leucopus (Singer) Boertm. 2002 – South America
- Camarophyllopsis microspora (A.H.Sm. & Hesler) Bon 1996 - North America
- Camarophyllopsis olivaceogrisea Ming Zhang, C.Q. Wang & T.H. Li 2019 - China
- Camarophyllopsis pedicellata (Natarajan & Manjula) Boertm. 2002 – Tamil Nadu, India
- Camarophyllopsis roseola (G.Stev.) Boertm. 2002 - New Zealand
- Camarophyllopsis rugulosoides (Hesler & A.H.Sm.) Boertm. 2002 - North America
- Camarophyllopsis schulzeri (Bres.) Herink 1958 - Europe
- Camarophyllopsis tetraspora (Singer) Raithelh. 1992 – South America

== See also ==
- List of Agaricales genera
