= Calvin Henry Kauffman =

American botanist and mycologist (1869–1931)

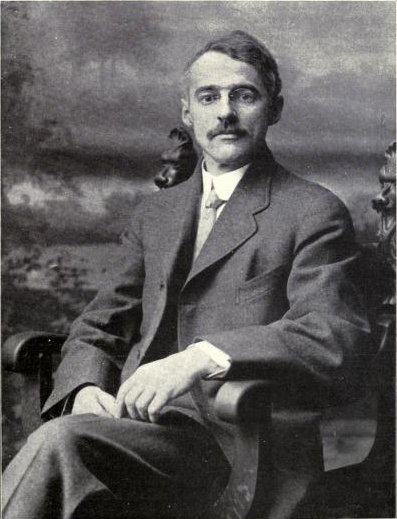

Calvin Henry Kauffman (March 1, 1869–1931) was an American botanist and mycologist. A fellow of the American Association for the Advancement of Science, he was affiliated with the University of Michigan from 1904 until his death, and was known for his studies of the family Agaricaceae.

The standard author abbreviation Kauffman is used to indicate this person as the author when citing a botanical name.

== See also ==
- Category:Taxa named by Calvin Henry Kauffman
