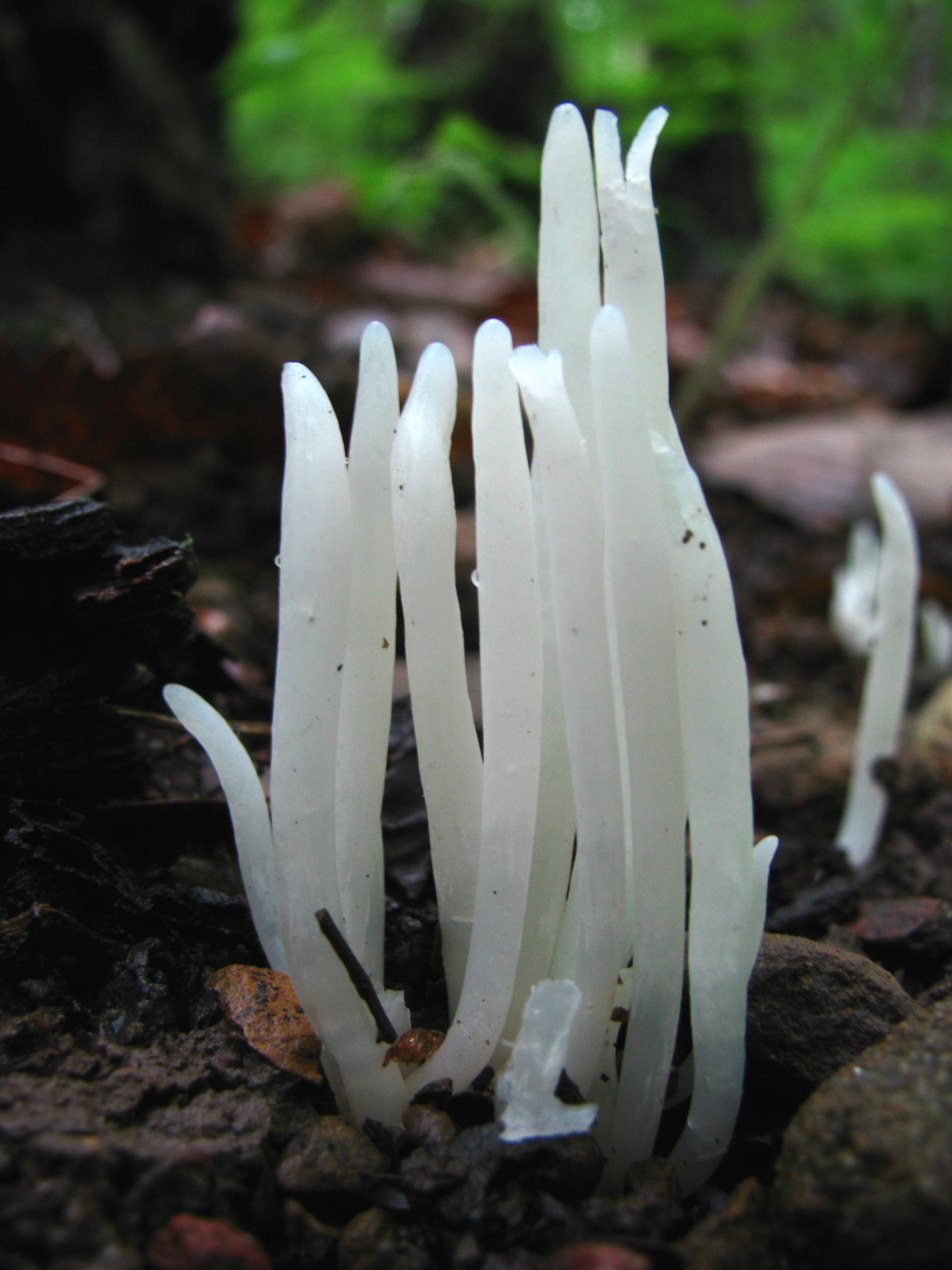
- Clavaria fragilis

Scientific classification
- Kingdom: Fungi
- Division: Basidiomycota
- Class: Agaricomycetes
- Order: Agaricales
- Family: Clavariaceae
- Genus: Clavaria; Vaill. ex L. (1753)

Type species
- Clavaria fragilis Holmsk. (1790)

Species
- see text

Synonyms
- Clavaria P.Micheli (1729); Clavaria sect. Holocoryne Fr. (1838); Holocoryne (Fr.) Bonord. (1851); Stichoclavaria Ulbr. (1928)

= Clavaria =

Genus of fungi

Clavaria is a genus of fungi in the family Clavariaceae. Species of Clavaria produce basidiocarps (fruit bodies) that are either cylindrical to club-shaped or branched and coral-like. They are often grouped with similar-looking species from other genera, when they are collectively known as the clavarioid fungi. All Clavaria species are terrestrial and most (if not all) are believed to be saprotrophic (decomposing dead plant material). In Europe, they are typical of old, mossy, unimproved grassland. In North America and elsewhere, they are more commonly found in woodlands.

== History ==
Clavaria (the name is derived from the Latin "clava", a club) was first introduced as a genus name by Vaillant (1727), later accepted by Micheli (1729), and was one of the original genera used by Linnaeus in his Species Plantarum of 1753. It contained all species of fungi with erect, club-shaped or branched (coral-like) fruit bodies, including many that are now referred to the Ascomycota. Subsequent authors described over 1200 species in the genus. The name Clavaria was also used for a group of red algae in the Gelidiaceae family of the Rhodophyta by Stackhouse in 1816. Because Clavaria Stackh. was also validly published, Donk in 1949 proposed that Clavaria Stackh. be rejected as a homonym of Clavaria Fries and that the latter name be retained as a nomen conservandum (conserved name). This proposal was moved by Doty (1948), recommended for adoption by Rogers (1949), and approved by the Special Committee for Fungi.

With increasing use of the microscope in the late nineteenth century, most of the ascomycetous members of the genus were recognized as distinct and moved to other genera. Clavaria was, however, still widely used for the majority of the basidiomycetous species until Corner published his world monograph of the clavarioid fungi in 1950, introducing the modern concept of the genus. Corner restricted Clavaria to those species with fruit bodies having inflated, unclamped, context hyphae (a character that makes Clavaria fruit bodies distinctly brittle). Species with clamped hyphae were placed in the segregate genera Clavulinopsis and Ramariopsis. This concept was modified in 1978 by Petersen, who considered Clavulinopsis an artificial genus, moving the majority of species to Ramariopsis but a minority back into Clavaria.

== Phylogeny ==
- - - - - - Clavaria argillacea
          - Clavaria fumosa
        - Clavaria redoleo-alli
      - Clavaria vermicularis
    - - Clavulinopsis laeticolor
      - Clavaria zollingeri

Phylogeny of "clavaria" clade based on ribosomal DNA sequences.

Recent phylogenetic research based on DNA sequencing suggests that all three genera are closely related, but does not unambiguously support either Corner's or Petersen's precise characterization of Clavaria. Too few species have yet been sequenced, however, for Clavaria to be redefined.

== Description ==
Fruit bodies are simple (cylindrical to club-shaped) or more rarely branched, sometimes with a distinct stipe (stem). Several of the species with simple fruit bodies form them in dense clusters. The fruit bodies themselves are smooth to grooved and typically brittle. Depending on species, they vary in colour from white or cream to yellow, pink, violet, brown, or black.

The hyphal system of Clavaria species is always monomitic. The context hyphae are inflated, thin-walled, and lack clamp connections (though Petersen's amended concept of the genus includes some species with clamps). The basidia are two- to four-spored, in some species with an open, loop-like clamp connection at the base. Spores are smooth or spiny. Spore prints are white.

== Habitat and distribution ==
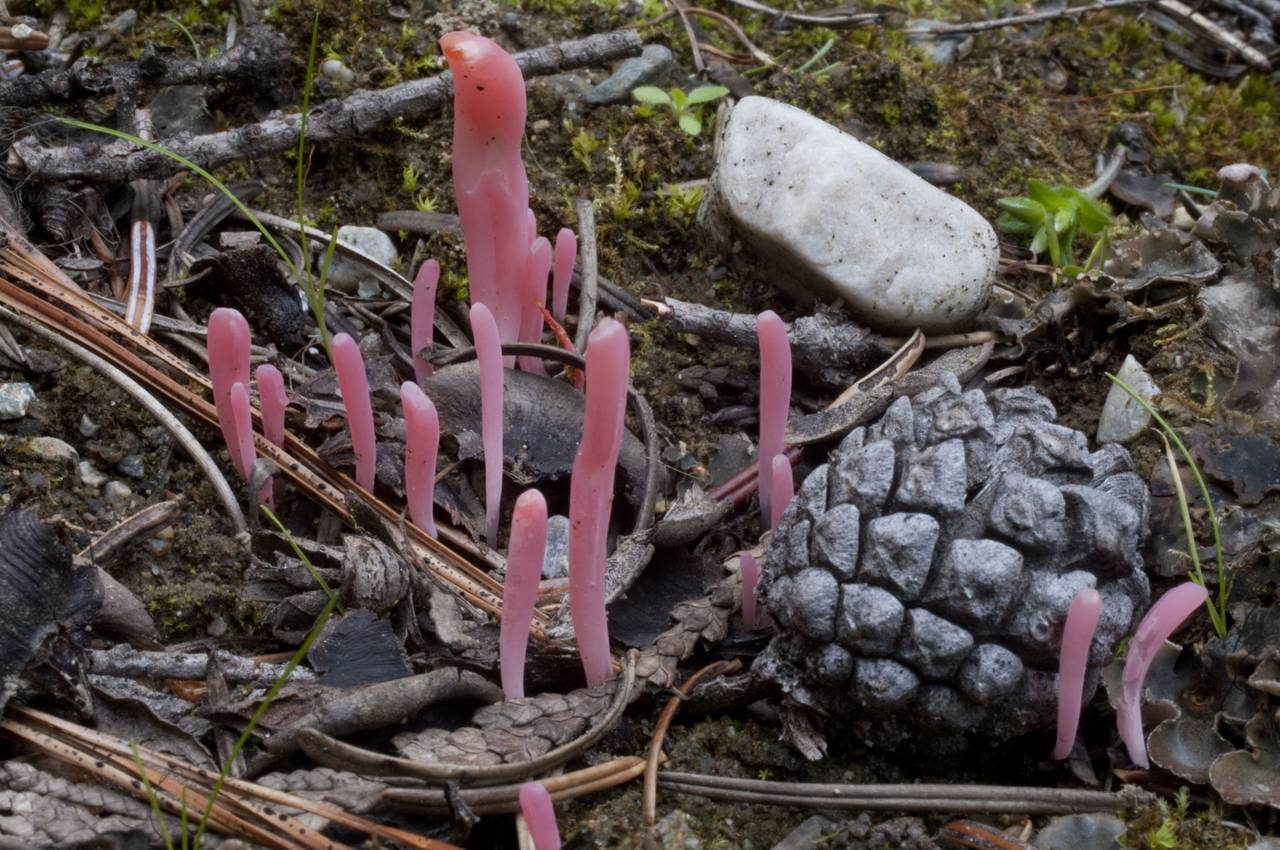
Clavaria rosea

Most Clavaria species are thought to be saprotrophic, decomposing leaf litter and other organic materials on the woodland floor. In Europe, species are more frequently found in old, unimproved grasslands (i.e., not used agriculturally) where they are presumed to be decomposers of dead grass and moss. At least one species (Clavaria argillacea) is, however, typical of heathland and is a possible mycorrhizal associate of heather.

Species of Clavaria occur in suitable habitats throughout the temperate regions and the tropics. Some 15 species are known from Europe; according to one 2008 estimate, 28 species are recognized worldwide. Petersen described 18 new species from New Zealand in a 1988 monograph. As of August 2015, Index Fungorum lists 175 valid species in Clavaria.

== Species ==
Image	Scientific name	Type locality
	Clavaria afrolutea	Cameroon
	Clavaria alboglobospora	New Zealand
	Clavaria amoenoides	India
	Clavaria ardosiaca	New Zealand
	Clavaria argillacea	Europe
	Clavaria asperulispora	USA
	Clavaria atroumbrina	USA
	Clavaria cupreicolor	New Zealand
	Clavaria divergens	China
	Clavaria echinobrevispora	New Zealand
	Clavaria echinonivosa	New Zealand
	Clavaria echino-olivacea	New Zealand
	Clavaria falcata	Europe
	Clavaria flavopurpurea	New Zealand
	Clavaria flavipes	Europe
	Clavaria fragilis	Denmark
	Clavaria flavostellifera	Spain
	Clavaria fumosa	Europe
	Clavaria globospora	USA
	Clavaria greletii	France
	Clavaria incarnata	Russia
	Clavaria lametina	
	Clavaria megaspinosa	New Zealand
	Clavaria mima	New Zealand
	Clavaria musculospinosa	New Zealand
	Clavaria novozealandica	New Zealand
	Clavaria orientalis	China
	Clavaria phoenicea	Indonesia
	Clavaria plumbeoargillacea	New Zealand
	Clavaria pullei	Netherlands
	Clavaria redoleoalii	New Zealand
	Clavaria rosea	Europe
	Clavaria roseoviolacea	New Zealand
	Clavaria rubicundula	USA
	Clavaria salentina	Italy
	Clavaria sphagnicola	France
	Clavaria stellifera	Netherlands
	Clavaria subsordida	New Zealand
	Clavaria tenuipes	England
	Clavaria tongdaoensis	China
	Clavaria tuberculospora	New Zealand
	Clavaria ypsilonidia	New Zealand
	Clavaria zollingeri	Indonesia

== See also ==
- List of Agaricales genera
