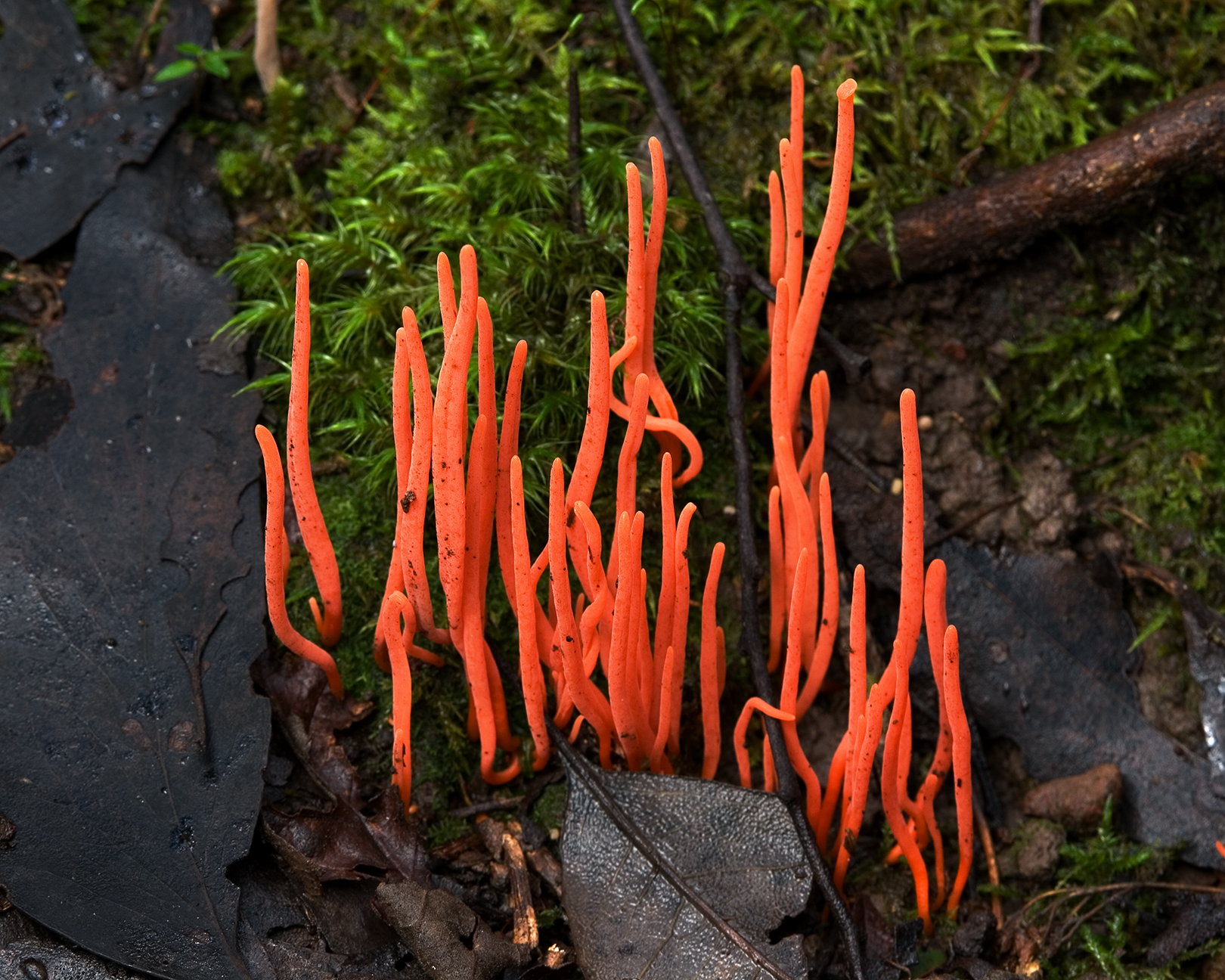
- Clavulinopsis corallinorosacea

Scientific classification
- Kingdom: Fungi
- Division: Basidiomycota
- Class: Agaricomycetes
- Order: Agaricales
- Family: Clavariaceae; Chevall. (1826)

Type genus
- Clavaria Vaill. ex L. (1753)

Genera
- Camarophyllopsis; Ceratellopsis; Clavaria; Clavicorona; Clavulinopsis; Hirticlavula; Hodophilus; Hyphodontiella; Lamelloclavaria; Mucronella; Ramariopsis

= Clavariaceae =

Family of fungi

The Clavariaceae are a family of fungi in the order Agaricales. Originally the family contained most of the clavarioid fungi (club and coral fungi), but in its current sense is more restricted, albeit with a greater diversity of basidiocarp (fruit body) forms. Basidiocarps are variously clavarioid or agaricoid (mushroom-shaped), less commonly corticioid (effused, crust-like) or hydnoid (with pendant spines).

== Taxonomy ==
=== History ===
Clavariaceae was originally circumscribed (as "Clavariae") by French botanist and mycologist François Fulgis Chevallier in 1826. It was one of five families (along with the Agaricaceae, Hydnaceae, Polyporaceae, and Thelephoraceae) that Elias Fries used to divide the Agaricales and Aphyllophorales in his influential work Systema Mycologicum. The family served as a convenient placement for all genera containing species with superficially similar club or coral-like fruitbodies. It was first M.A. Donk and later E.J.H. Corner who realized that, in this broad sense, the family was not a natural phylogenetic assemblage of related species. Corner published his world monograph in 1950 (revised in 1967 and updated in 1970), introducing modern concepts of many genera of clavarioid fungi. Corner included three genera in his concept of the Clavariaceae: Clavaria, Clavulinopsis, and Ramariopsis.

=== Current status ===
Molecular research, based on cladistic analysis of DNA sequences, has confirmed Corner's concept of the Clavariaceae, but has extended it to include agarics (gilled mushrooms) in the genera Camarophyllopsis, Hodophilus, and Lamelloclavaria. The clavarioid genera Clavicorona, Hirticlavula, and a revised concept of Ceratellopsis are also included, as is the hydnoid genus Mucronella and the corticioid genus Hyphodontiella.

Morphological variety of Clavariaceae

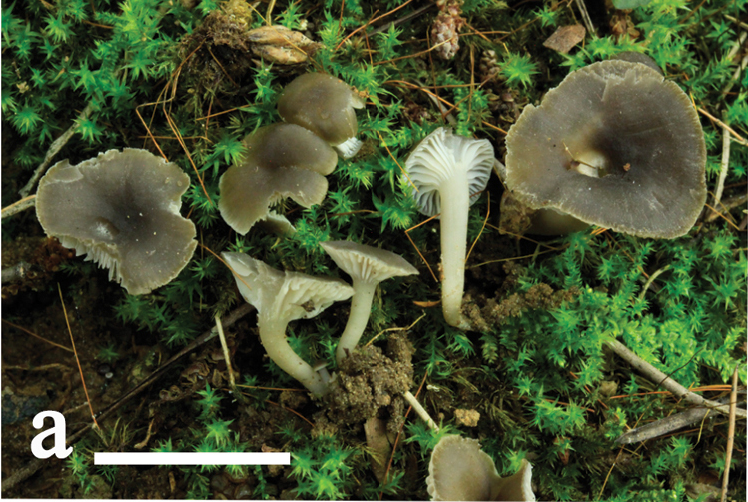
Agaricoid: Camarophyllopsis olivaceogrisea

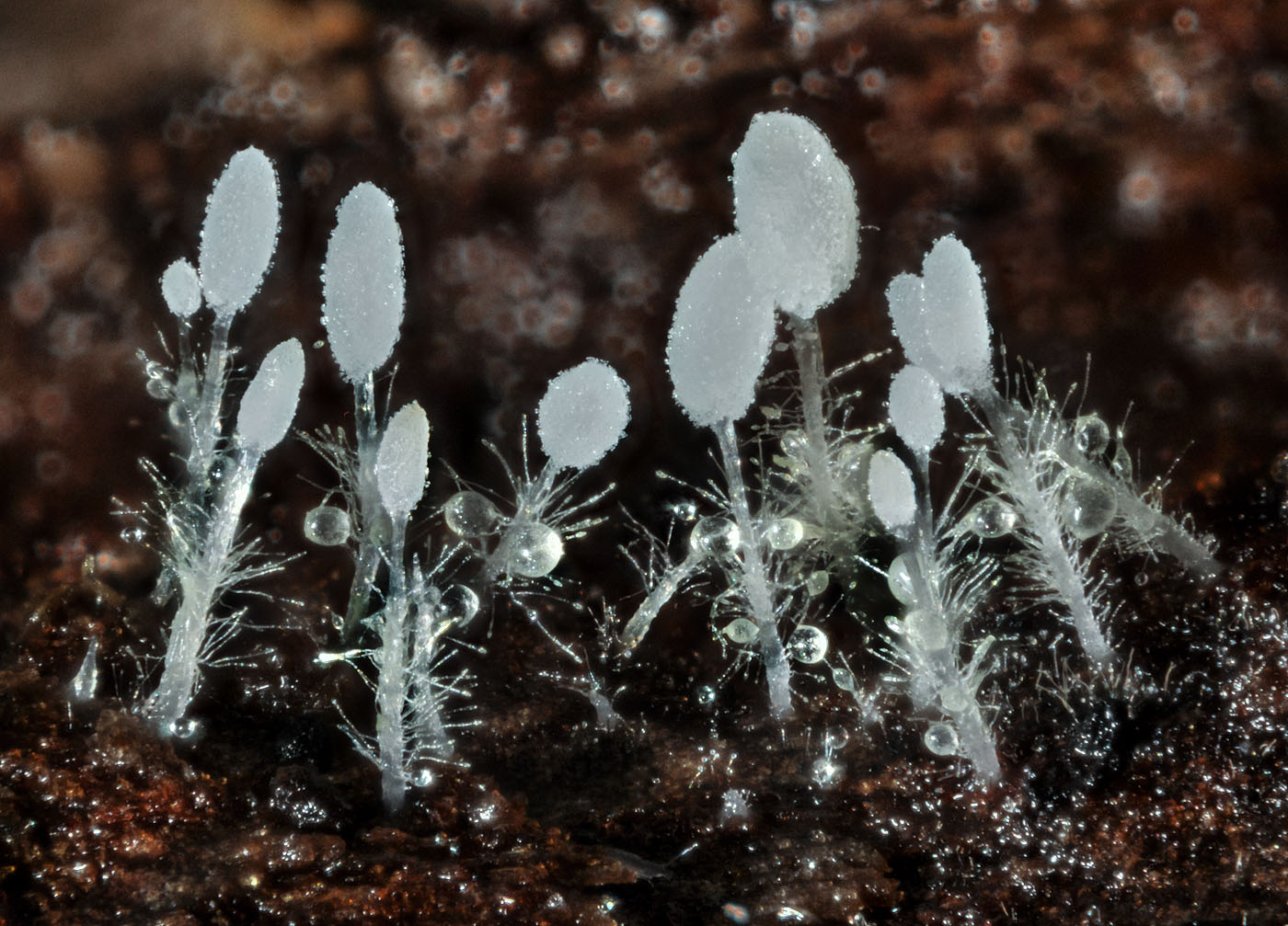
Clavarioid: Hirticlavula elegans

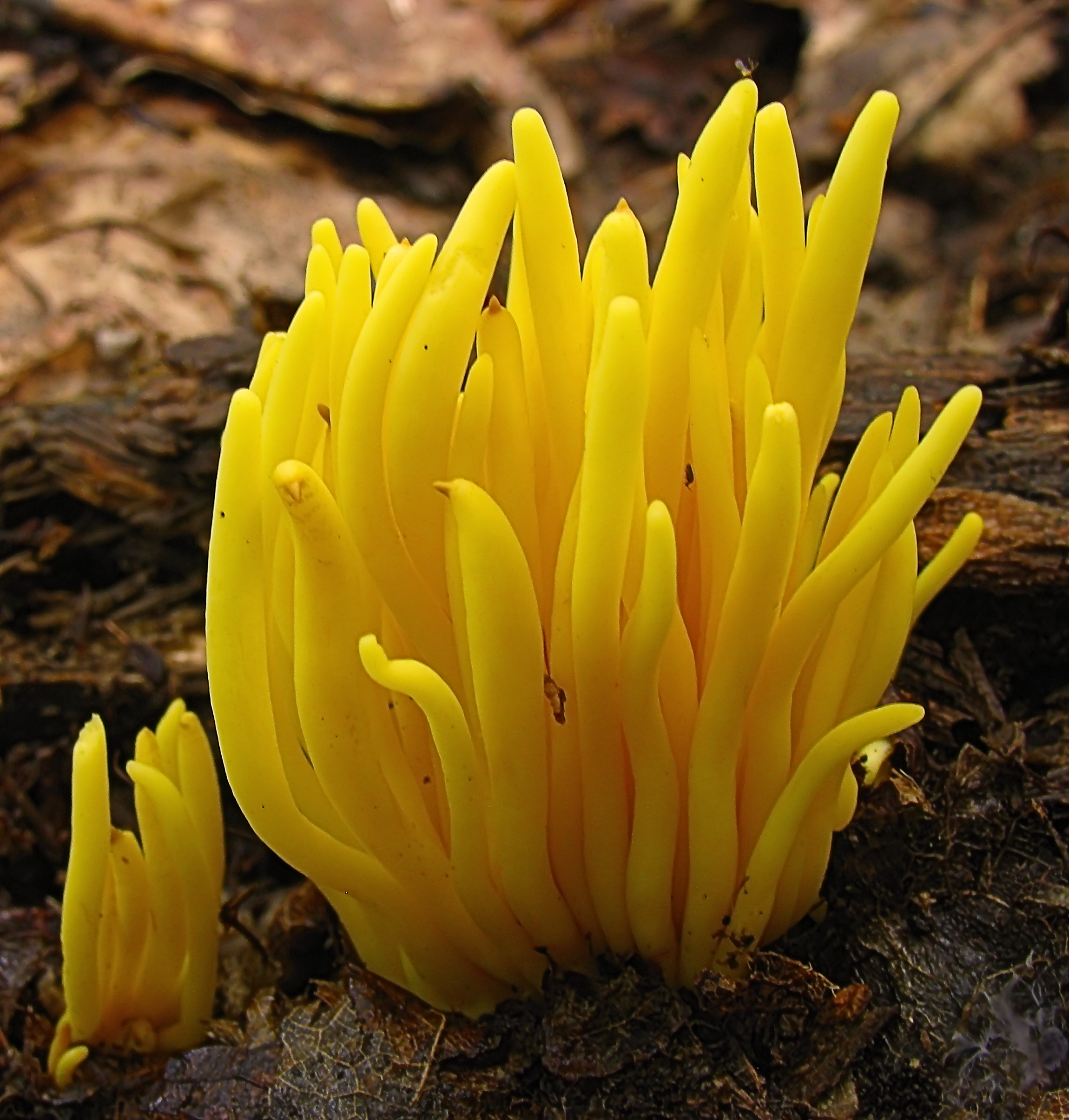
Clavarioid: Clavulinopsis fusiformis

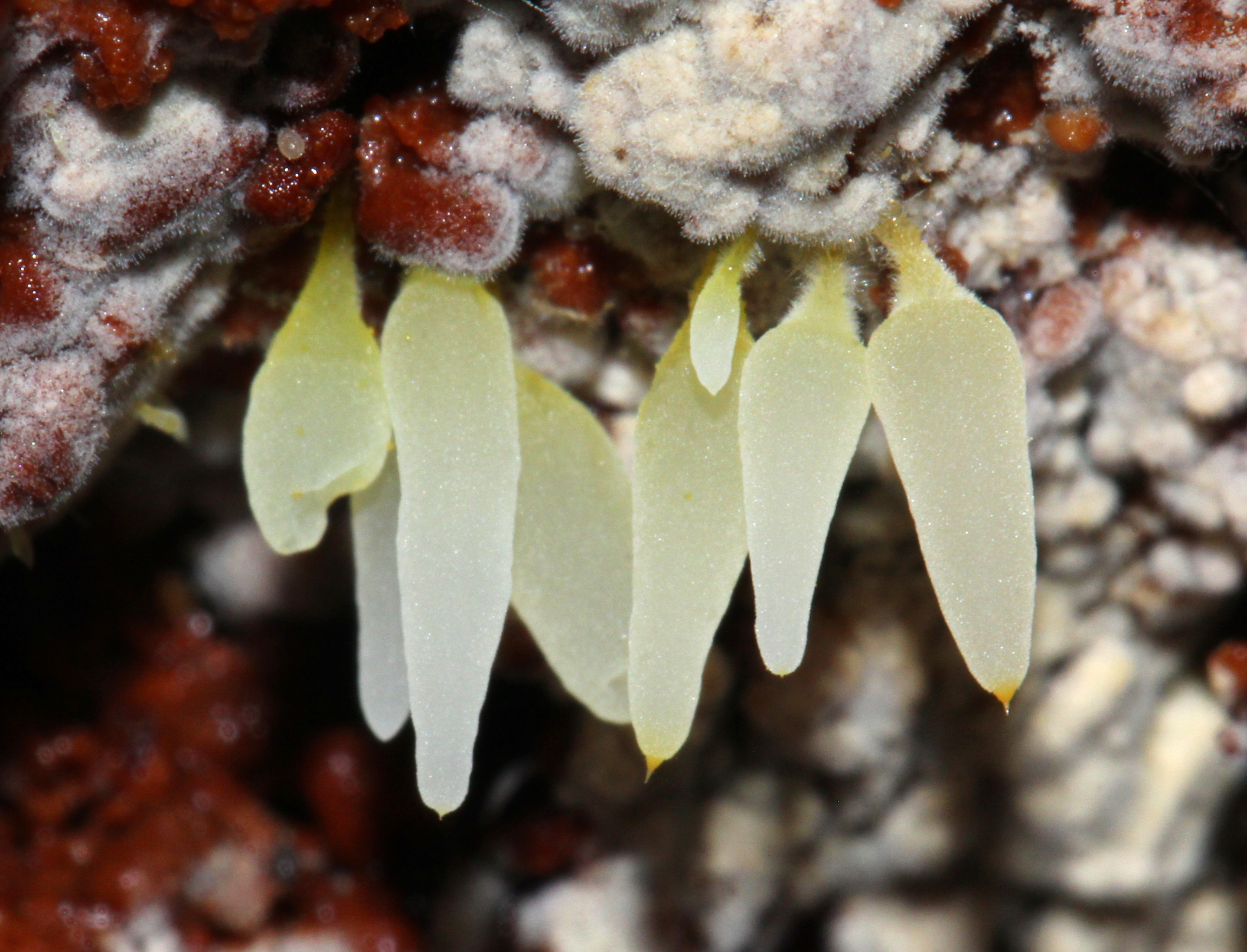
Hydnoid: Mucronella pendula

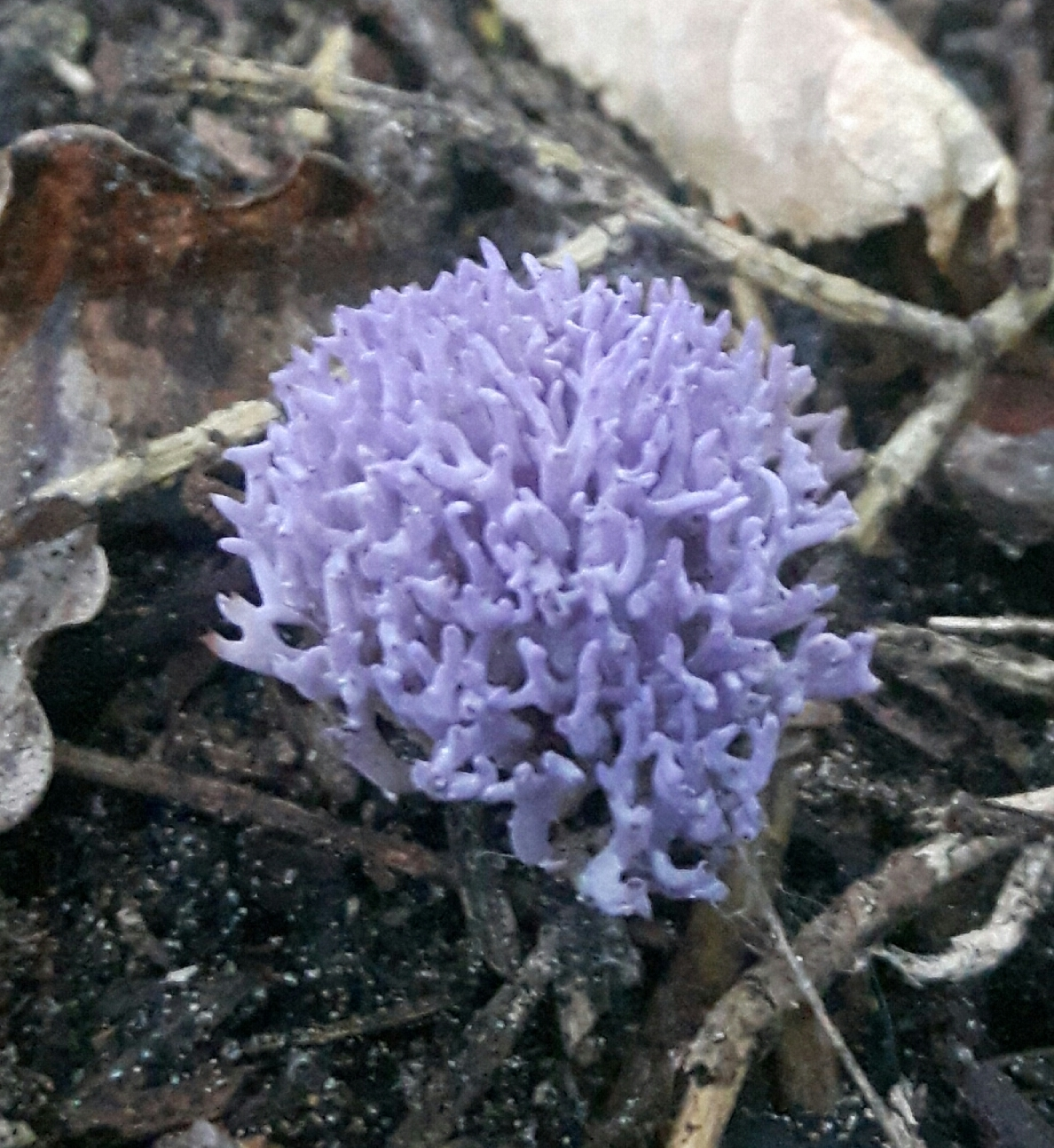
Clavarioid: Ramariopsis pulchella

== Habitat and distribution ==
The family has a worldwide distribution, though many individual species are more localized. Basidiocarps of Hirticlavula, Hyphodontiella, and Mucronella occur on dead wood and are thus normally found in woodland. Species of the remaining genera may also be found in woodland, but in Europe are more typical of old, agriculturally unimproved waxcap grasslands.

== Ecology ==
Lignicolous species are presumed to be saprotrophic, wood-decaying fungi; Ceratellopsis species occur on dead leaves and litter and are also presumed to be saprotrophic. The remaining members of the Clavariaceae are considered to be biotrophic, a few forming associations with ericaceous plants.

== See also ==
- List of Agaricales families
