= Black chanterelle =

Black chanterelle is a common name of several fungi species and can refer to:

- Craterellus cornucopioides
- Craterellus cinereus
- Craterellus atrocinereus
- Polyozellus multiplex
