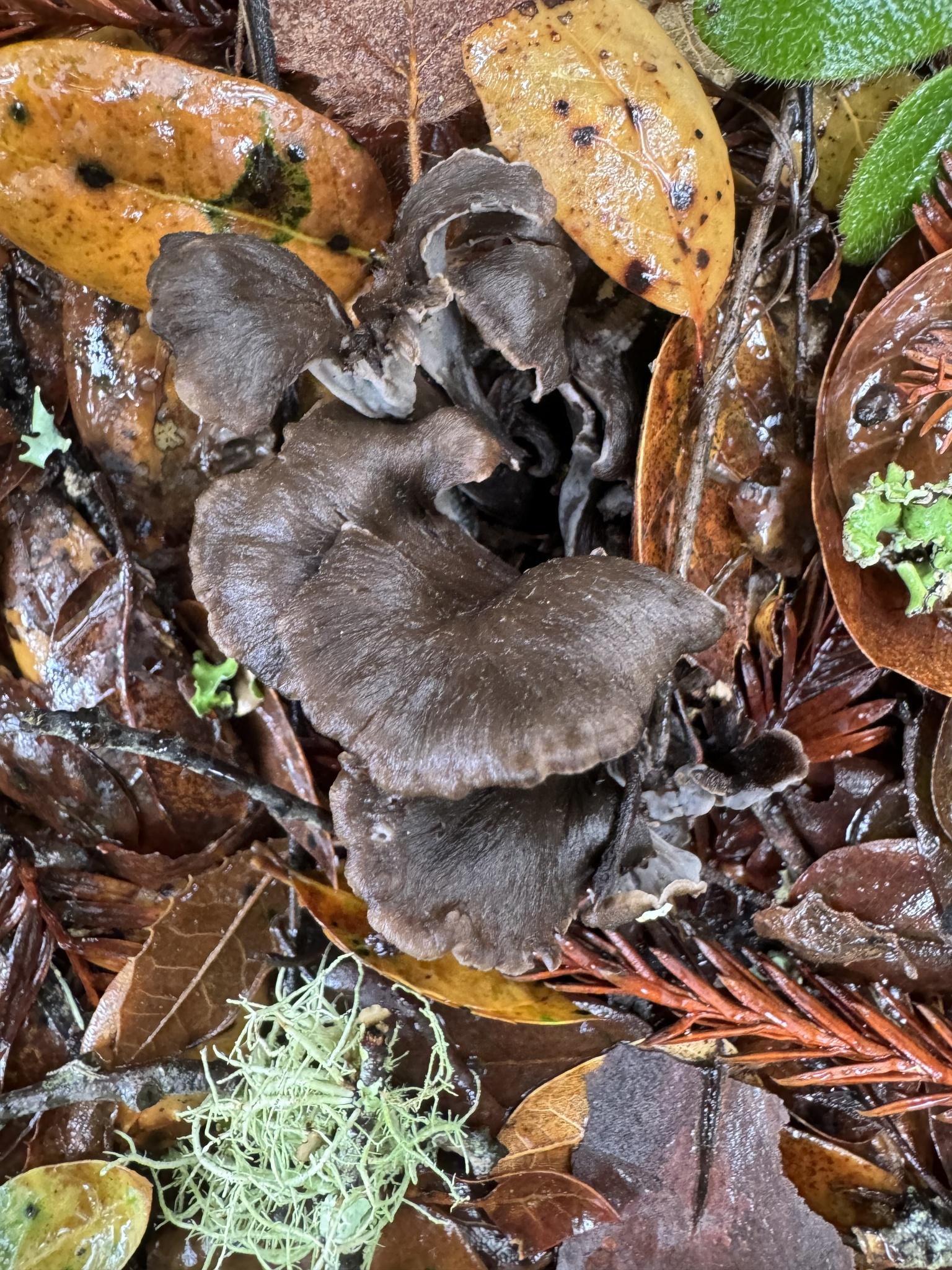

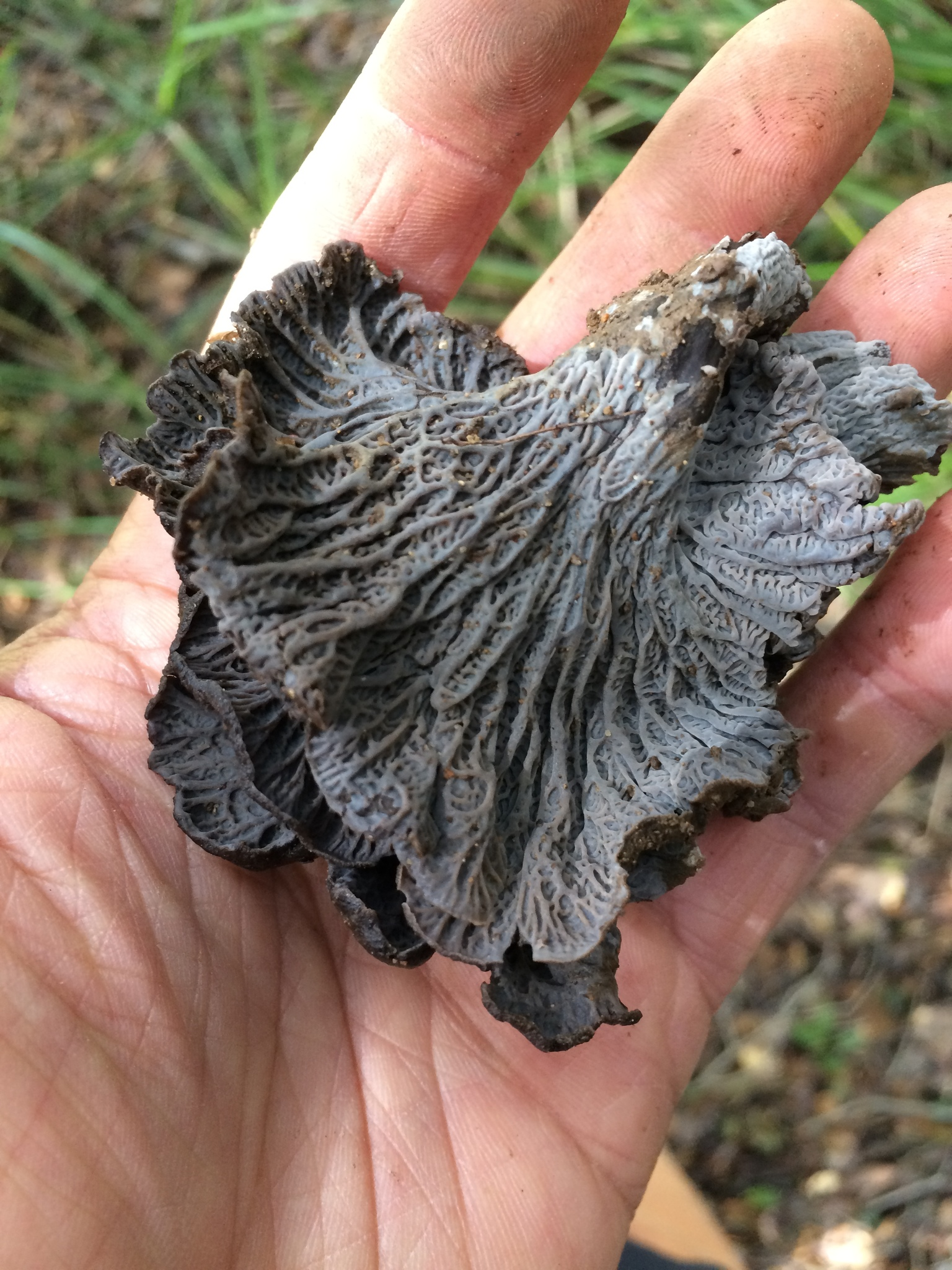

Scientific classification
- Domain: Eukaryota
- Kingdom: Fungi
- Division: Basidiomycota
- Class: Agaricomycetes
- Order: Cantharellales
- Family: Cantharellaceae
- Genus: Craterellus
- Species: C. atrocinereus

Binomial name
- Craterellus atrocinereus D.Arora & J.L.Frank (2015)

= Craterellus atrocinereus =

Species of fungus

Craterellus atrocinereus Mycological characteristics
- Ridges on hymenium
- Cap is infundibuliform
- Hymenium is decurrent
- Stipe is bare
- Spore print is white
- Ecology is mycorrhizal
- Edibility is choice

Craterellus atrocinereus, commonly known as the black chanterelle or California black chanterelle, is a species of edible fungus native to western North America. This uncommon species is a mycorrhizal associate of live oak, tanoak, and Oregon white oak in Oregon and northern California, where it is found most often in the vicinity of Monterey Bay. This species has a "fruity-cheesy" odor, and fruits in winter and spring. This bluish-gray to black chanterelle was previously considered to be Craterellus cinereus but was recognized as a distinct species in 2015. The specific name is a nod to C. cinereus, with the Latin prefix atro meaning dark and cinereus (akin to cinders) referring to its smoky gray coloration.

== See also ==
- Cantharellus californicus
- Craterellus calicornucopioides
