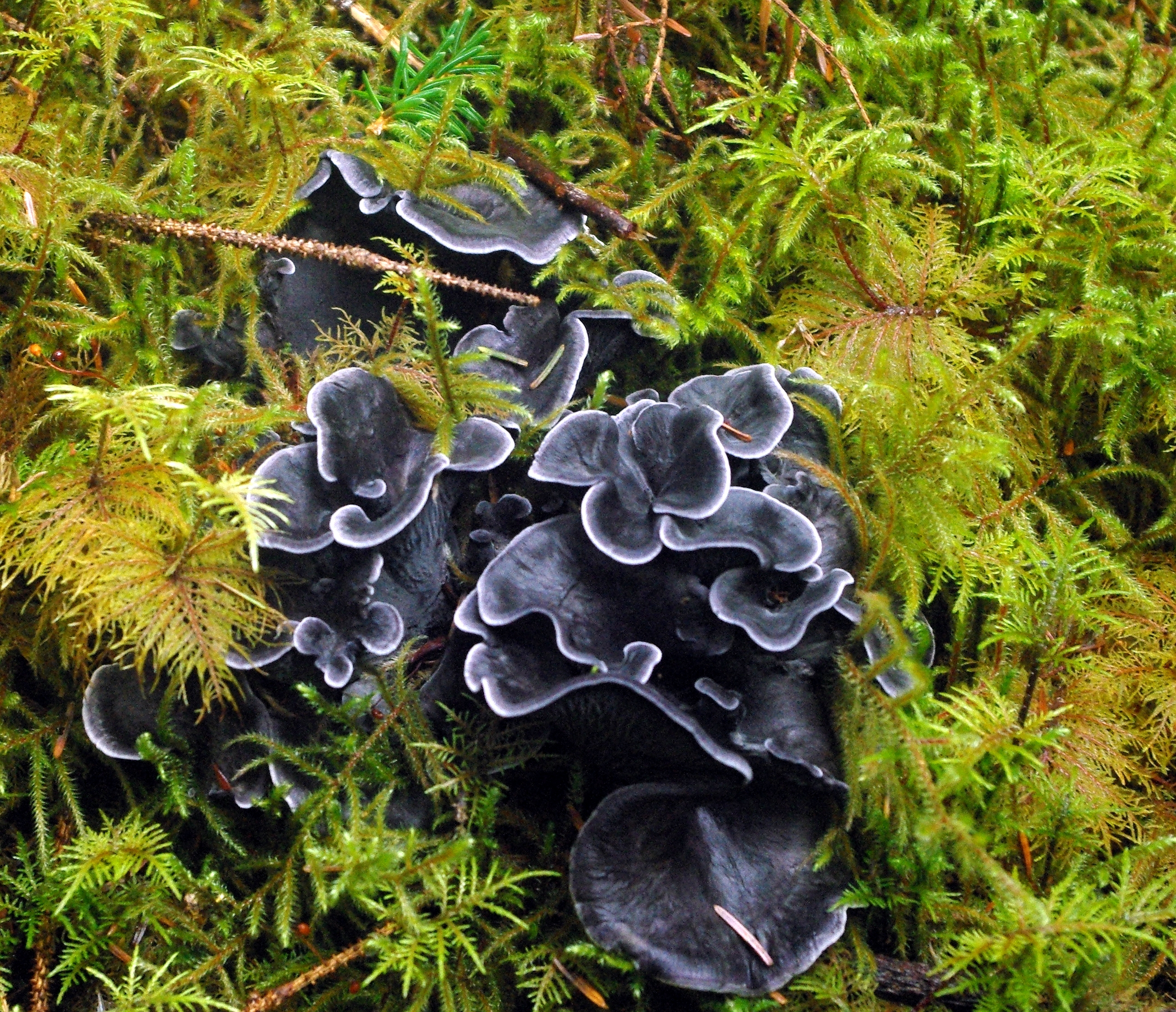

Scientific classification
- Kingdom: Fungi
- Division: Basidiomycota
- Class: Agaricomycetes
- Order: Thelephorales
- Family: Thelephoraceae
- Genus: Polyozellus; Murrill 1910

Type species
- Polyozellus multiplex (Underw.) Murrill

Species
- See text

= Polyozellus =

Genus of fungus

Polyozellus
- Mycological characteristics
- Ridges on hymenium
- Cap is infundibuliform
- Hymenium attachment is irregular or not applicable
- Stipe is bare
- Spore print is white
- Ecology is mycorrhizal
- Edibility is edible

Polyozellus is a fungal genus in the family Thelephoraceae, a grouping of mushrooms known collectively as the leathery earthfans. Previously considered a monotypic genus, it now contains the Polyozellus multiplex species complex. The genus name is derived from the Greek poly meaning many, and oz, meaning branch. It is commonly known as the blue chanterelle, the clustered blue chanterelle, bluefan, or, in Alaska, the black chanterelle. The distinctive fruit body of this species comprises blue- to purple-colored clusters of vase- or spoon-shaped caps with veiny wrinkles on the undersurface that run down the length of the stem.

Polyozellus has had a varied taxonomic history and has been reclassified several times at both the family and genus level. The range of Polyozellus includes North America and eastern Asia, where it grows on the ground of coniferous forests, usually under spruce and fir trees. It contains edible species, and has been harvested for commercial purposes.

== Taxonomy ==
The first published description of the species was written by botanist Lucien M. Underwood in 1899, based on a specimen found the previous year in the woods of Mount Desert, Maine. Although he called the new species a Cantharellus, he noted that "the plant is a remarkable one and from its habit might well form a distinct genus since it has little in common with Cantharellus except its fold-like gills." In 1910, William Murrill transferred it to the new genus Polyozellus; Murrill thought the compound structure of the stem to be a sufficiently unique characteristic to warrant it being separated from Cantharellus species, which have simpler stem structures. In 1920, specimens from a Japanese collection compiled by A. Yasuda were sent to mycologist Curtis Gates Lloyd, who believed the fungus to be a new species and named it Phyllocarbon yasudai.

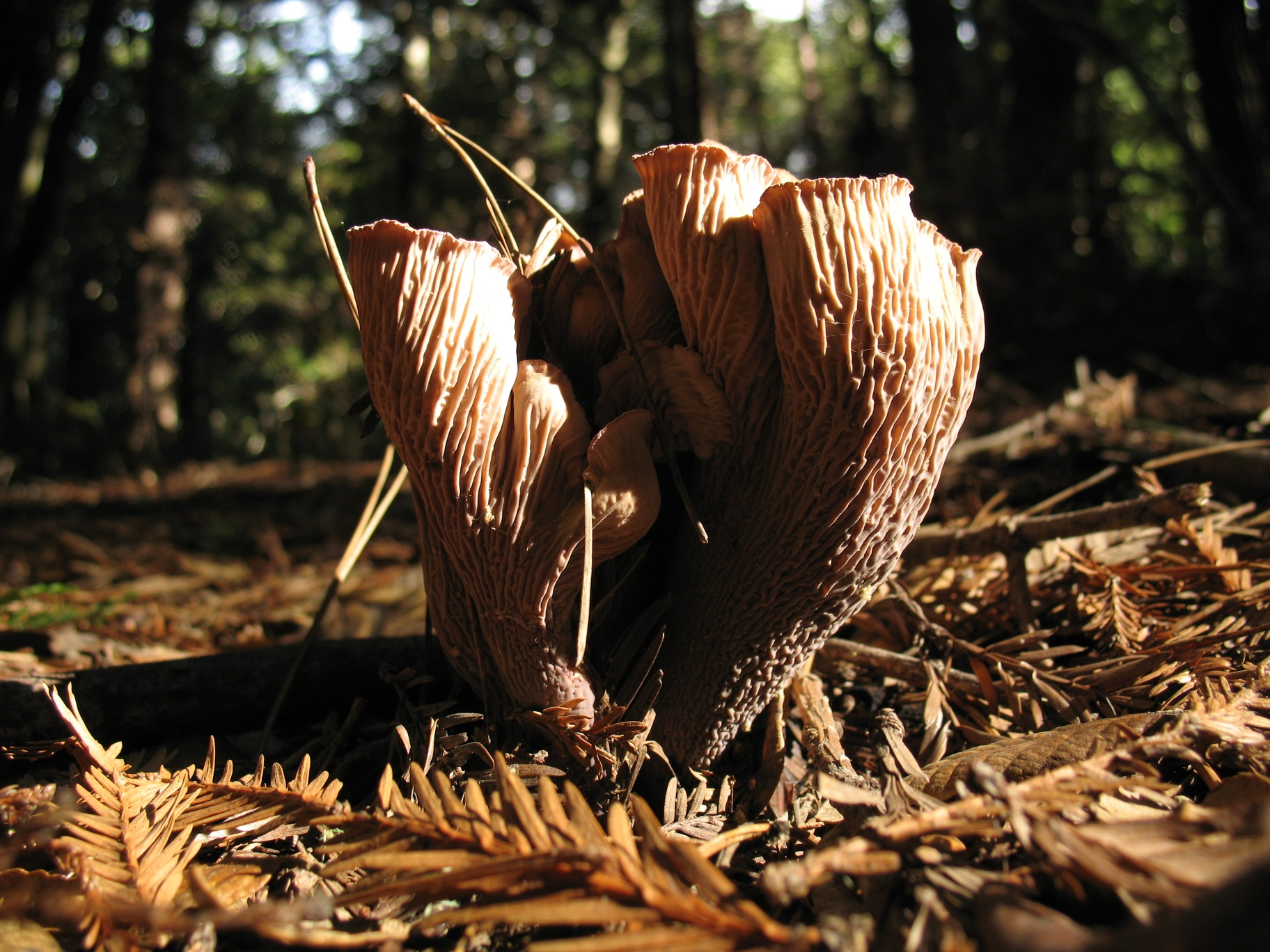
Polyozellus multiplex was once considered to be an extreme growth form of Gomphus clavatus, shown here.

No further collections of the fungus were reported until 1937, when it was found in Quebec, Canada. The next year, Paul Shope considered the genus Polyozellus to be superfluous, pointed out that the compound fruit bodies and the wrinkled hymenium were instead consistent with the genus Craterellus. In 1939, American mycologist Lee Oras Overholts, in a letter to the journal Mycologia, opined that both of these authors had overlooked a 1925 publication by Calvin Henry Kauffman, who made notes and photos of the species collected in the Rocky Mountains of Wyoming and Colorado, and in the Cascade Mountains of Washington and Oregon. Kauffman believed the species to be merely "a very extreme growth condition" of Cantharellus clavatus (now known as Gomphus clavatus) and suggested there was no reason for transferring the species to the genus Craterellus. Mycologists Alexander H. Smith and Elizabeth Eaton Morse, in their 1947 publication on Cantharellus species in the United States, placed the species in a new section Polyozellus, but did not separate it from the genus Cantharellus; they defined the distinguishing characteristics of Polyozellus as the small, roughened, hyaline spores and the color change of the flesh in potassium hydroxide solution, adding that "the spores are unusual for the genus but in our estimation do not warrant excluding the species."

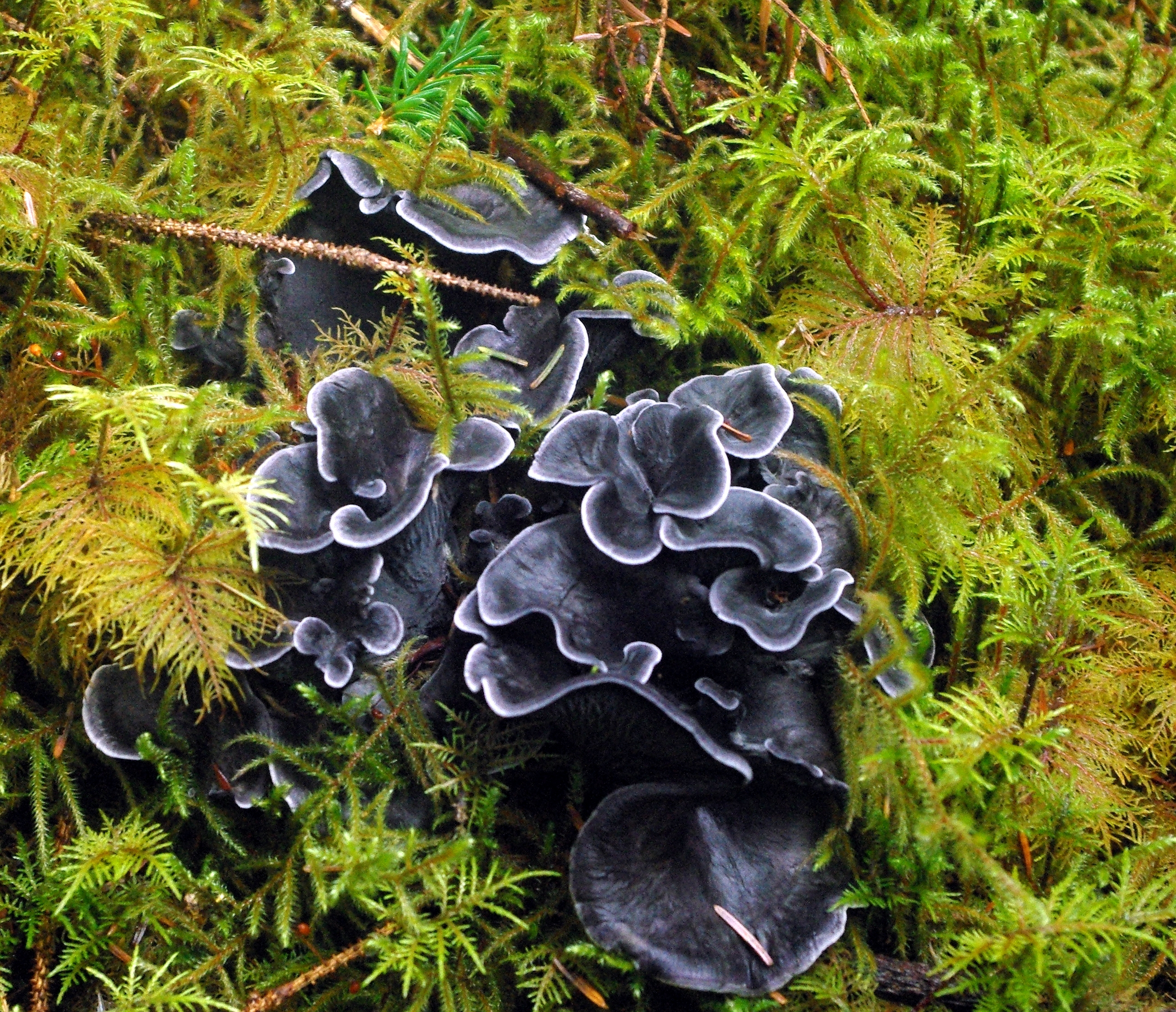
Polyozellus multiplex – Haida Gwaii

In 1953, Rokuya Imazeki took into consideration differences in spore characteristics: species in the genus Cantharellus were not known to have spores that were subglobose (roughly spherical) and tuberculate (covered with wart-like projections) like Polyozellus; however, these spore characteristics were common in species in the family Thelephoraceae (Cantharellus belongs in a different family, the Cantharellaceae). Other characteristics linking the blue chanterelle with the Thelephoraceae included the dark color, the strong odor (especially in dried specimens), and the presence of thelephoric acid, a mushroom pigment common in the family. Taken together, these factors led Imazeki to propose the new family Phylacteriaceae. The suggested family-level taxonomical change was not accepted by other authors; for example, in 1954, Seiichi Kawamura renamed it Thelephora multiplex.

In 2017, researchers from eastern Europe and North America collaborated on a molecular phylogeny of the previously monotypic Polyozellus multiplex. They determined that Polyozellus contains five species that are distinguished by spore size and geographic region: the small-spored P. multiplex and P. atrolazulinus and the large-spored P. mariae, P. marymargaretae, and P. purpureoniger. As of 2022, both Index Fungorum and MycoBank list Polyozellus as being within the family Thelephoraceae, a grouping of mushrooms commonly known as the leathery earthfans.

In 2021, researchers studied the phylogenetic relationship between Polyozellus and Pseudotomentella, two genera of closely related, ectomycorrhizal fungi in the order Thelephorales; the former stipitate and the latter corticioid. Both are widespread in the Northern Hemisphere and many species from both genera seem to be restricted to old-growth forest. The research revealed that Polyozellus makes Pseudotomentella paraphyletic. As a result, nearly all species previously placed in Pseudotomentella were recombined to Polyozellus, except Pseudotomentella larsenii.

An article published in 2025, Polyozellus albus was described as a new species from Sweden.

Common names for this genus include the blue chanterelle and the clustered blue chanterelle. In Alaska, where specimens typically have very dark-colored fruit bodies, it is called the black chanterelle, although this name is shared with some Craterellus species.

== Description ==
Species in the genus have spathulate to funnel-shaped fruit body, with a ridged underside. They overlap in colour and range from brown to blue, purple or black, depending on species and stage of maturity. The pilei of young specimens are woolly or hirsute on top but become smooth with age, while the hymenium has a consistently matte appearance. Their consistency is soft and brittle. Microscopically all Polyozellus species are similar and share the features of hyaline, inamyloid spores covered in irregular lobes or nodules and clamped hyphae.

== Species ==
As of October 2025, the Index Fungorum and Mycobank databases list 28 species in the genus.

- Polyozellus abundilobus (Svant.) Svant. & Kõljalg 2020
- Polyozellus albus Svant. 2025
- Polyozellus alnophilus (Svant.) Svant. & Kõljalg 2021
- Polyozellus alobatus (Svant.) Svant. & Kõljalg 2021
- Polyozellus atrofuscus (M.J. Larsen) Svant. & Kõljalg 2021
- Polyozellus atrolazulinus S.A. Trudell & Kõljalg 2018
- Polyozellus badjelanndanus (Svant.) Svant. & Kõljalg 2021
- Polyozellus flavovirens (Höhn. & Litsch.) Svant. & Kõljalg 2021
- Polyozellus griseopergamaceus (M.J. Larsen) Svant. & Kõljalg 2021
- Polyozellus humicola (M.J. Larsen) Svant. & Kõljalg 2021
- Polyozellus mariae Voitk & Kõljalg 2018
- Polyozellus marymargaretae Beug & I. Saar 2018
- Polyozellus medius (Svant. & Kõljalg) Svant. & Kõljalg 2021
- Polyozellus mucidulus (P. Karst.) Svant. & Kõljalg 2021
- Polyozellus multiplex (Underw.) Murrill 1910
- Polyozellus niger (Höhn. & Litsch.) Kõljalg & Svant. 2024
- Polyozellus pinophilus (Svant.) Svant. & Kõljalg 2021
- Polyozellus plurilobus (Svant.) Svant. & Kõljalg 2021
- Polyozellus purpureoniger Spirin & I. Saar 2018
- Polyozellus rhizopunctatus (E.C. Martini & Hentic) Svant. & Kõljalg 2021
- Polyozellus rotundisporus (Svant.) Svant. & Kõljalg 2021 Svant. & Kõljalg 2021
- Polyozellus sciastrus (Svant. & Kõljalg) Svant. & Kõljalg 2021
- Polyozellus sorjusensis (Svant.) Svant. & Kõljalg 2021
- Polyozellus tristis (P. Karst.) Svant. & Kõljalg 2021
- Polyozellus tristoides (Svant. & K.H. Larss.) Svant. & Kõljalg 2021
- Polyozellus umbrinascens (Svant.) Svant. & Kõljalg 2021
- Polyozellus umbrinus (Fr.) Svant. & Kõljalg 2021
- Polyozellus vepallidosporus (M.J. Larsen) Svant. & Kõljalg 2021

== Habitat and distribution ==
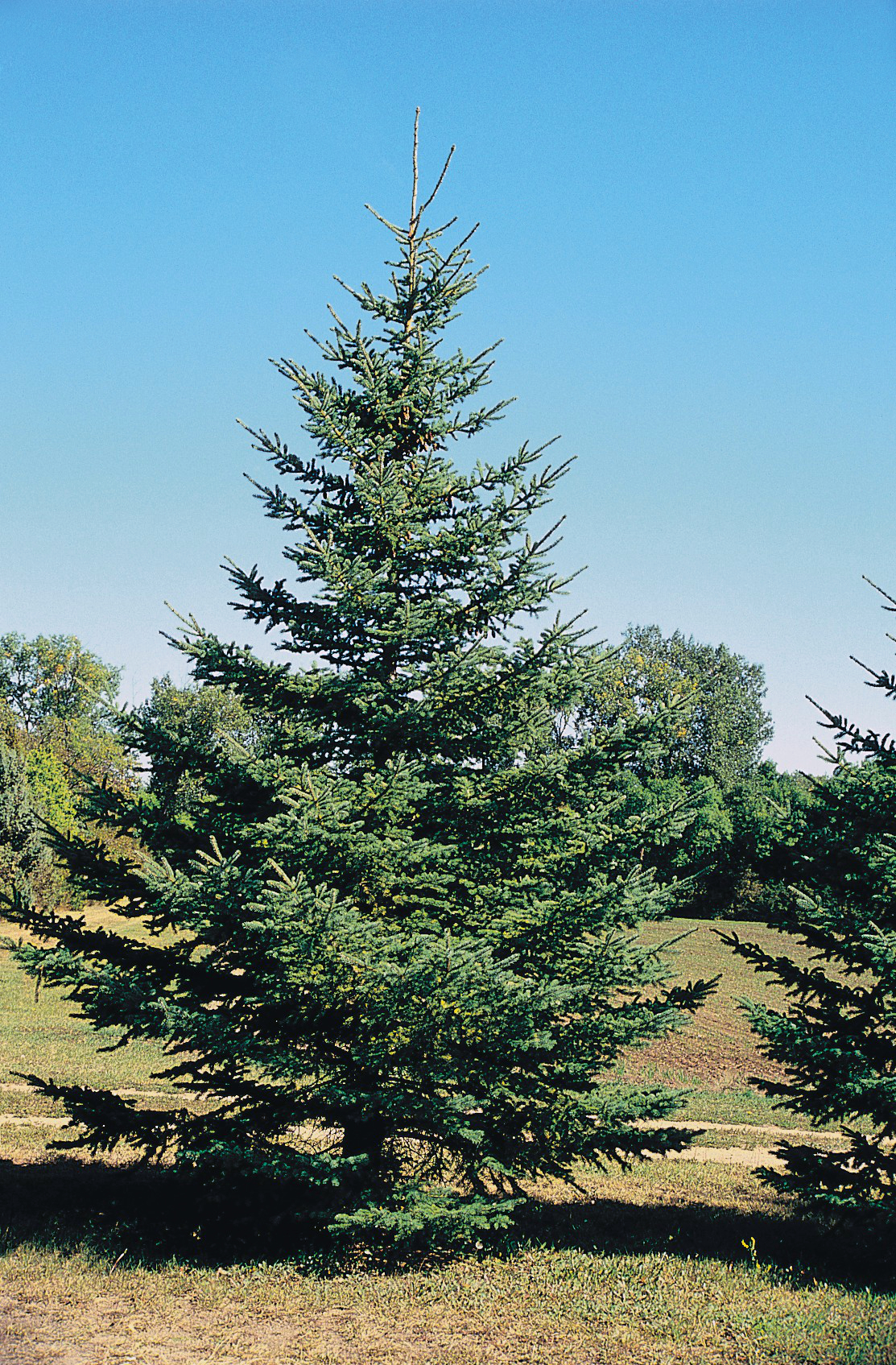
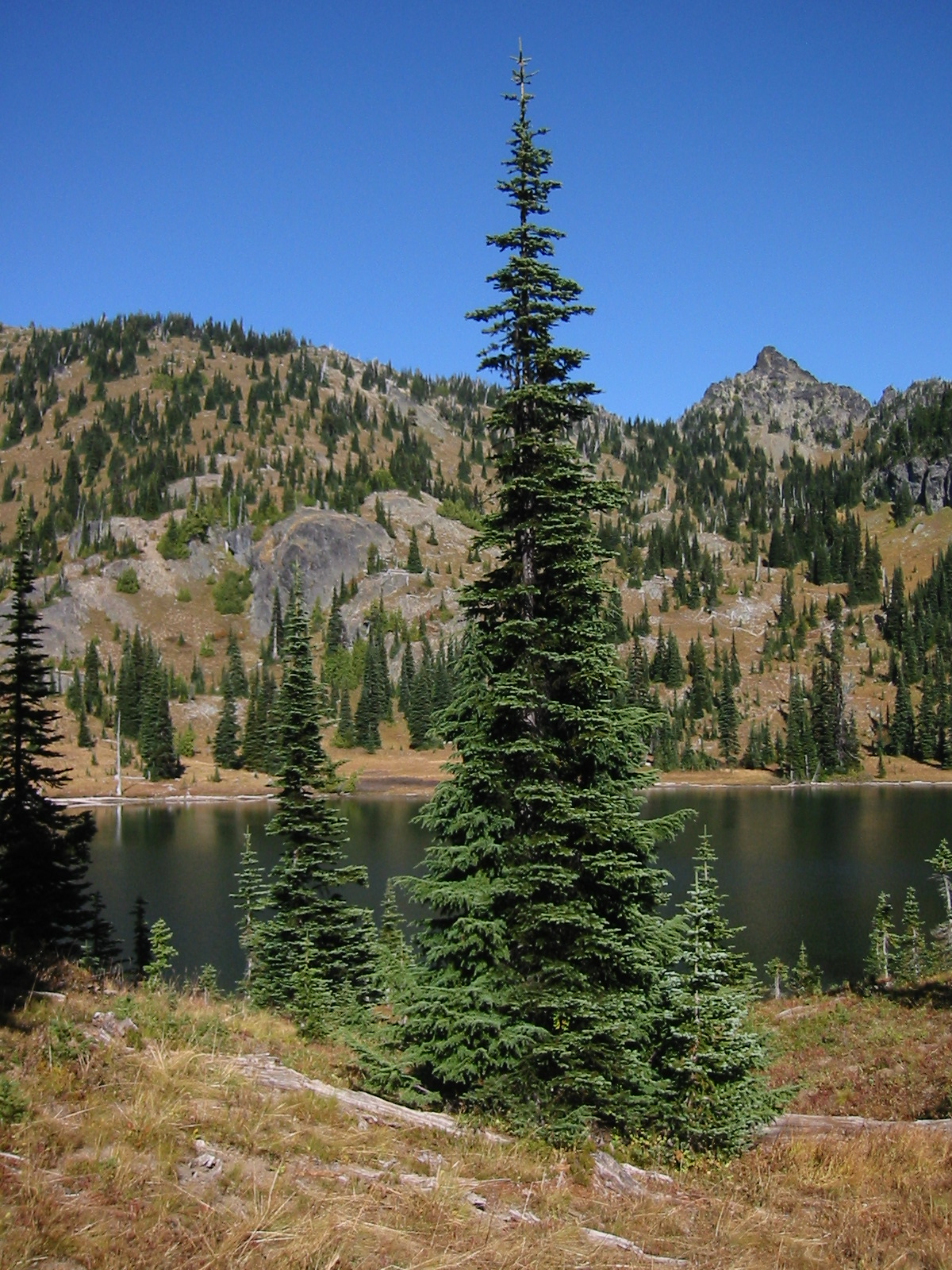
Polyozellus grows in a mycorrhizal association with conifers like spruce (example left) and fir (right).

Polyozellus grows in coniferous woods under spruce and fir, and more frequently at higher elevations. It is most often encountered in summer and fall.

This genus is northern and alpine in distribution, and rarely encountered. Collections have been made in the United States (including Maine, Oregon, Colorado, New Mexico, and Alaska), Canada (Quebec and British Columbia), China, Japan, and Korea. The disjunct distribution of the genus in North America and East Asia has been noted to occur in a number of other fungal species as well. In the American Pacific Northwest, the genus is found in September and October. It is also found in the Queen Charlotte Islands (off the northern Pacific coast of Canada), where it is commercially harvested.

== Cited literature ==
- Pilz D, Norvell L, Danell E, Molina R (2003). Ecology and management of commercially harvested chanterelle mushrooms. General Technical Report PNW-GTR-576 (PDF). Portland, OR: Department of Agriculture, Forest Service, Pacific Northwest Research Station.
