= Trumpet mushroom =

Trumpet mushroom is a common name for several species of mushroom, including:

- Craterellus cornucopioides, the black trumpet mushroom, found in North America, Eurasia, and Australia
- Craterellus fallax, black trumpets, native to Eastern North America
- Pleurotus eryngii, the king trumpet mushroom, native to Mediterranean regions of Europe, the Middle East, and North Africa
