= Craterellus elegans =

Scientific classification
- Kingdom: Fungi
- Division: Basidiomycota
- Class: Agaricomycetes
- Order: Cantharellales
- Family: Cantharellaceae
- Genus: Craterellus
- Species: C. elegans

Binomial name
- Craterellus elegans Rick, 1931

Species of fungus

Craterellus elegans is a species of fungus in the family Cantharellaceae.
