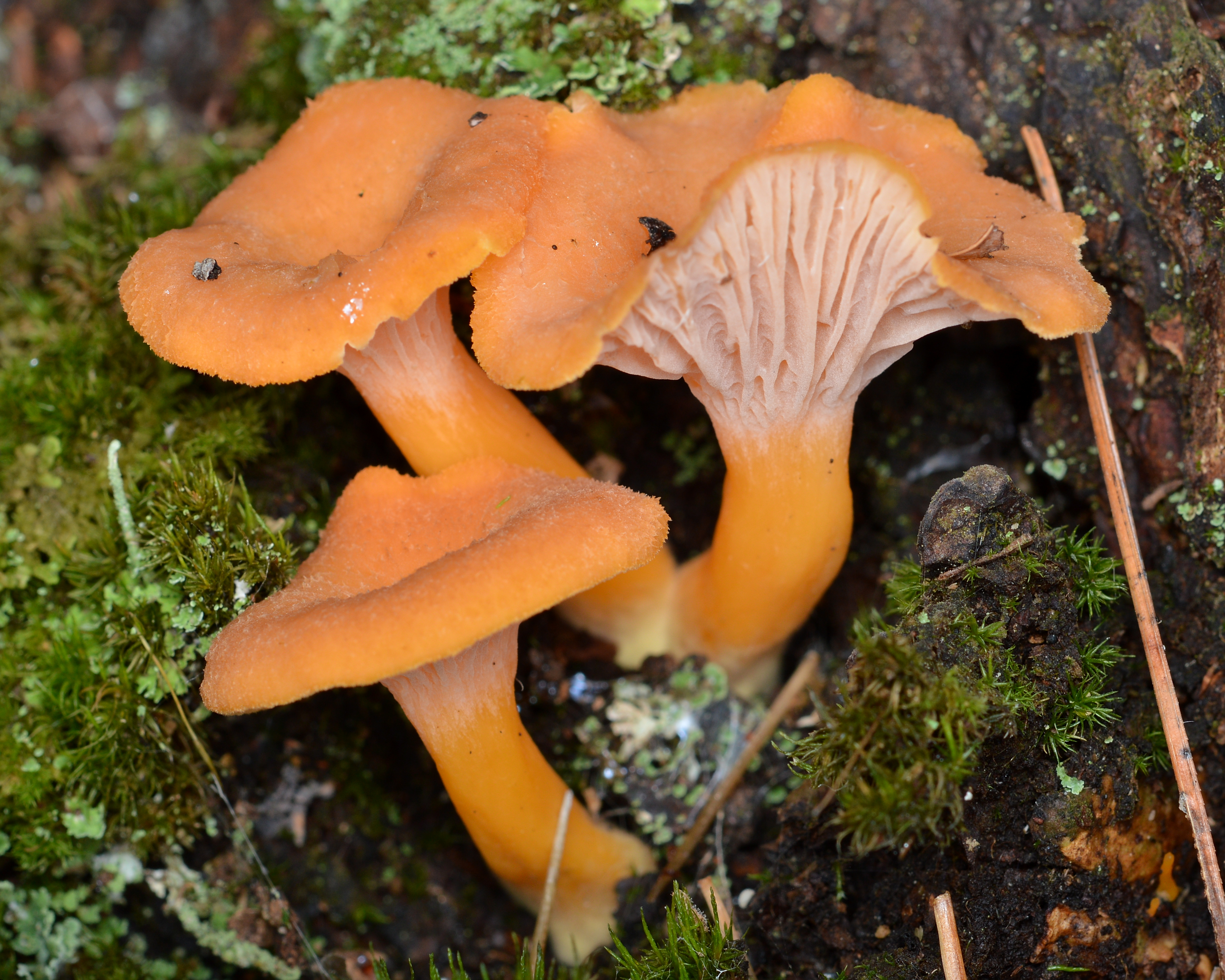

Scientific classification
- Kingdom: Fungi
- Division: Basidiomycota
- Class: Agaricomycetes
- Order: Cantharellales
- Family: Cantharellaceae
- Genus: Craterellus
- Species: C. ignicolor

Binomial name
- Craterellus ignicolor (R. H. Petersen) Dahlman, Danell & Spatafora (2000)

Synonyms
- Cantharellus ignicolor R.H.Petersen (1975)

= Craterellus ignicolor =

Craterellus ignicolor
- Mycological characteristics
- Ridges on hymenium
- Cap is infundibuliform
- Hymenium is decurrent
- Stipe is bare
- Spore print is pink to yellow
- Ecology is mycorrhizal
- Edibility is edible

Craterellus ignicolor is an edible fungus, also known as the flame-colored chanterelle. It was first described as C. ignicolor in 1975 from Tennessee, USA; prior to 1975, it was referred to as Cantharellus lutescens and C. infundibuliformis var. luteolus. In 2000, DNA analysis showed that this chanterelle should be classified within Craterellus, rather than in Cantharellus as previously thought.

Craterellus ignicolor fruiting bodies commonly grow amongst moss in areas with significant shade, such as coniferous or hardwood forests, and tend to occur scattered and in groups or clusters during the summer-fall. They can be both mycorrhizal (symbiotic) with trees or saprotrophic (feeding off dead plant material). Pinkish or brownish-orange false gills, one of their most defining features, are visible on the underside of the cap. The center of these caps becomes perforated with age, where it develops a clear, vase-like appearance with a hollow stalk. The lower surface of the fungus is pale yellow to yellow-orange when young, then tends to develop pinkish or lavender hues with age; its spore print is pale pinkish-yellow. Its taste and odor are not known to be distinctive.
