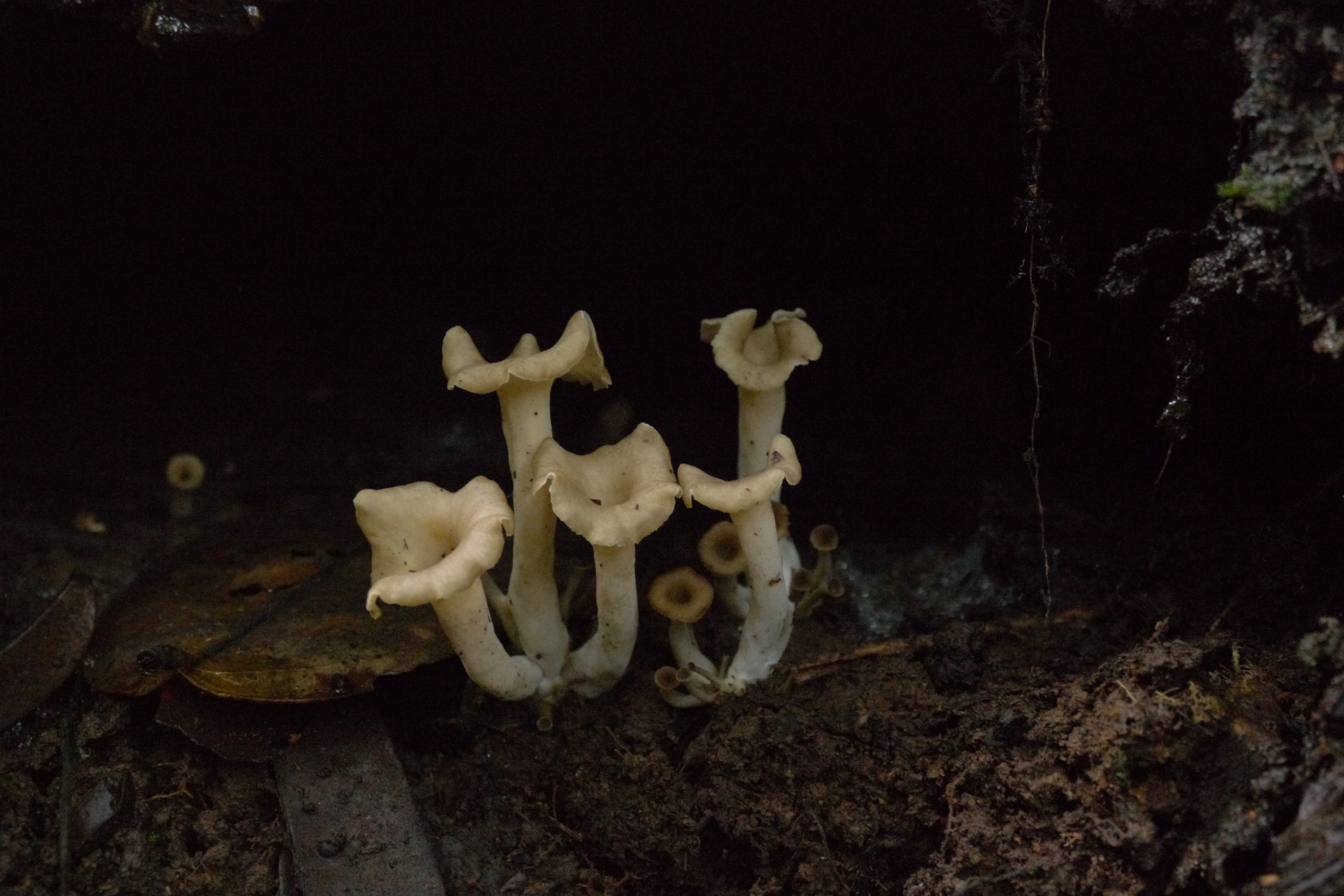

Scientific classification
- Domain: Eukaryota
- Kingdom: Fungi
- Division: Basidiomycota
- Class: Agaricomycetes
- Order: Cantharellales
- Family: Cantharellaceae
- Genus: Craterellus
- Species: C. excelsus

Binomial name
- Craterellus excelsus T.W.Henkel & Aime (2009)

= Craterellus excelsus =

Species of fungus

Craterellus excelsus is a species of fungus in the family Cantharellaceae. Reported as a new species in 2009, it was originally collected from the Pakaraima Mountains of Guyana. The species is found in rainforests that are composed predominantly of Dicymbe species. C. excelsus has fruit bodies that may be up to 15 cm (6 in) in height and grow in dense clusters.
