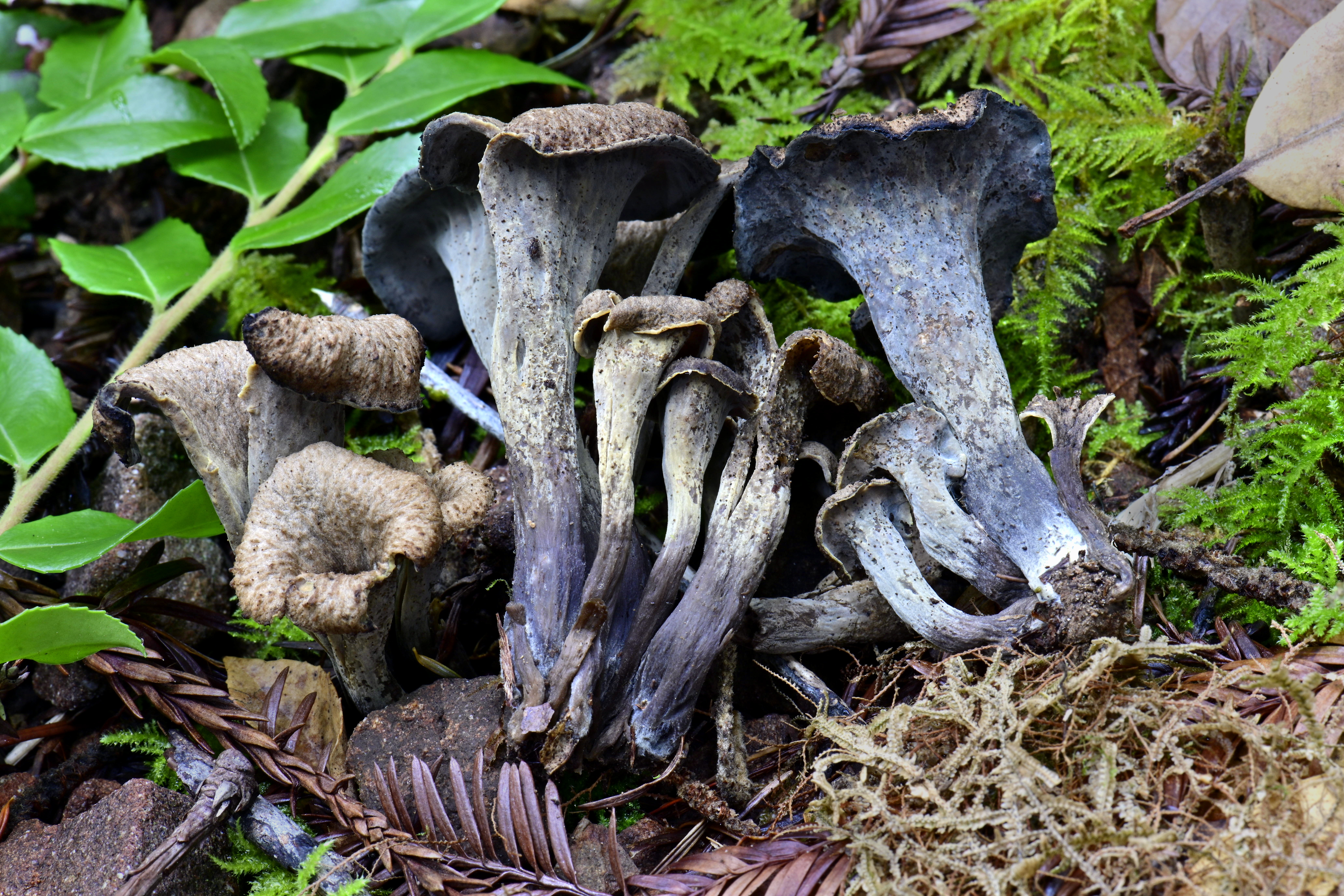

Scientific classification
- Domain: Eukaryota
- Kingdom: Fungi
- Division: Basidiomycota
- Class: Agaricomycetes
- Order: Cantharellales
- Family: Cantharellaceae
- Genus: Craterellus
- Species: C. calicornucopioides

Binomial name
- Craterellus calicornucopioides D.Arora & J.L.Frank (2015)

= Craterellus calicornucopioides =

Species of fungus

Craterellus calicornucopioides is an edible fungus in the family Cantharellaceae. Described by David Arora and Jonathan L. Frank in 2015, is the North American version of the similar European species Craterellus cornucopioides. Molecular phylogenetics has shown that they are, however, distinct species. C. calicornucopioides associates with and fruits in the vicinity of oaks, manzanita, madrone, and Vaccinium.

Craterellus calicornucopioides Mycological characteristics
- Ridges on hymenium
- Cap is infundibuliform
- Hymenium is decurrent
- Stipe is bare
- Spore print is white
- Ecology is mycorrhizal
- Edibility is edible

== See also ==
- Craterellus atrocinereus
