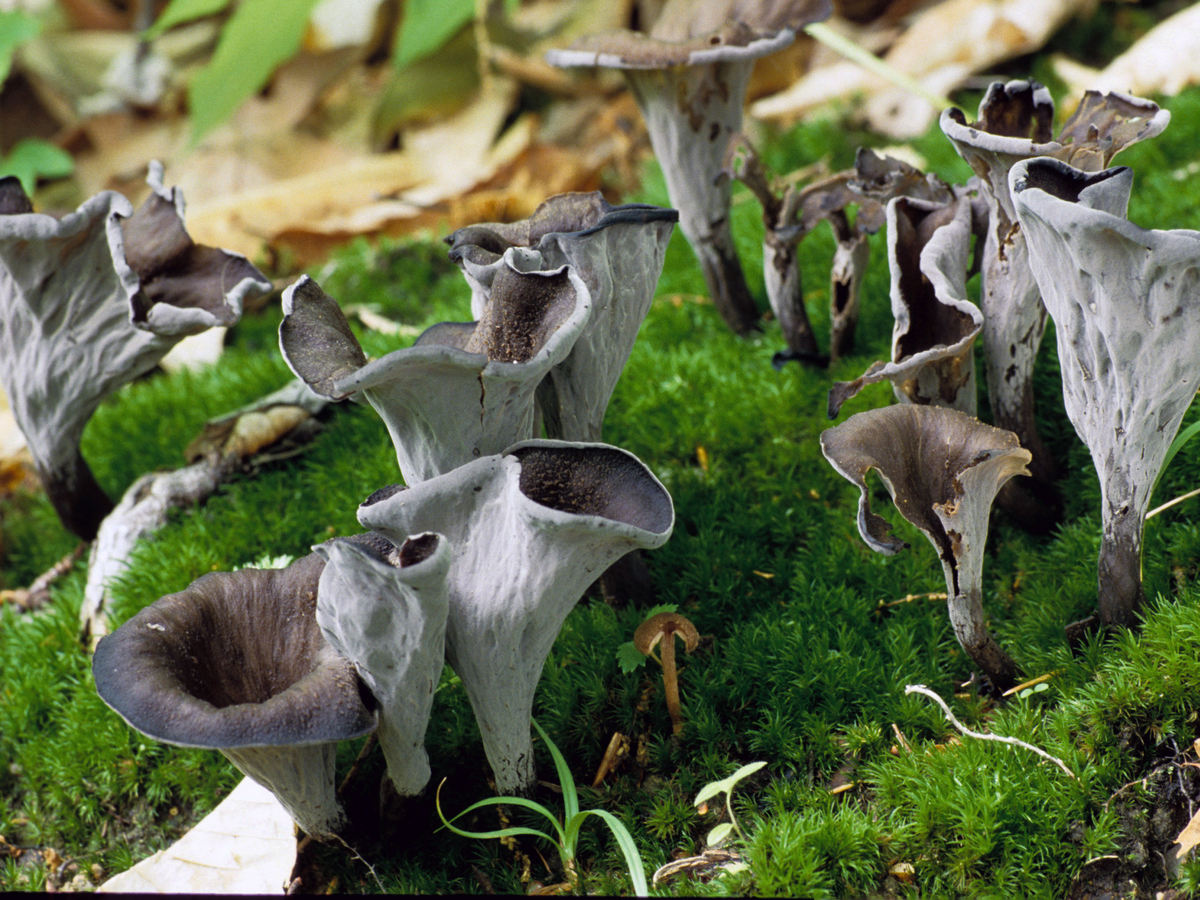

Scientific classification
- Kingdom: Fungi
- Division: Basidiomycota
- Class: Agaricomycetes
- Order: Cantharellales
- Family: Cantharellaceae
- Genus: Craterellus
- Species: C. fallax

Binomial name
- Craterellus fallax A.H. Sm.

= Craterellus fallax =

Craterellus fallax
- Mycological characteristics
- Ridges on hymenium
- Cap is infundibuliform
- Hymenium is decurrent
- Stipe is bare
- Spore print is yellow-orange
- Ecology is mycorrhizal
- Edibility is choice

Craterellus fallax is a species of "black trumpets" that occurs in Eastern North America. With a number of lookalikes in the genus, it is edible but not substantial.

== Description ==
Craterellus fallax is grayish to blackish, skinny and 3–12 centimetres (1–4 1/2 in) tall. The inside is smooth and black when young, turning rough and gray with age. The flesh is brittle and grayish to blackish.

The spore print is a pinkish yellow-orange.

=== Similar species ===
In western North America, C. fallax is replaced by C. calicornucopioides.

Craterellus fallax may be synonymous with the European species C. cornucopioides, which produces a white spore print.

A number of other species in the genus are similar.

== Distribution and habitat ==
The species occurs in Eastern North America.

== Ecology ==
C. fallax is mycorrhizal, forming associations with Tsuga and Quercus species, among others.

== Uses ==
It is a choice edible fungus, although is not substantial.
