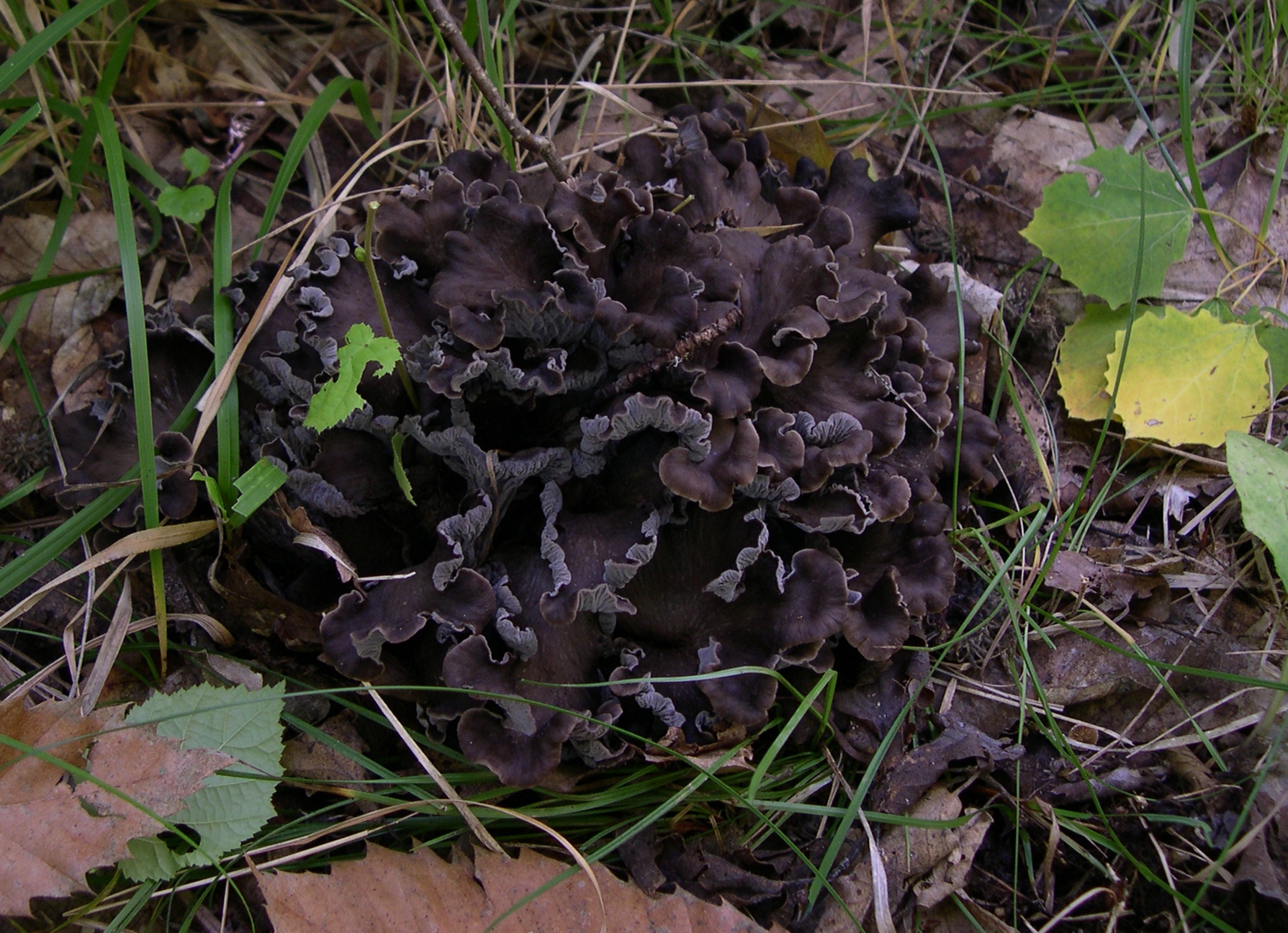

Scientific classification
- Kingdom: Fungi
- Division: Basidiomycota
- Class: Agaricomycetes
- Order: Cantharellales
- Family: Cantharellaceae
- Genus: Craterellus
- Species: C. cinereus

Binomial name
- Craterellus cinereus (Pers.) Pers.,1825

Synonyms
- Merulius cinereus (Pers.) Pers., 1798; Cantharellus cinereus (Pers.) Fr. 1821; Pseudocraterellus cinereus (Pers.) Kalamees, 1963; Cantharellus hydrolyps J. Schröt., 1888

= Craterellus cinereus =

Species of fungus

Craterellus cinereus
- Mycological characteristics
- Ridges on hymenium
- Cap is infundibuliform
- Hymenium is decurrent
- Stipe is bare
- Spore print is white
- Ecology is mycorrhizal
- Edibility is edible

Craterellus cinereus, commonly known as the black chanterelle or ashen chanterelle, is a species of fungus in the genus Craterellus. Found in forests in Europe and North America, it is edible.

== Description ==
Craterellus cinereus are greyish-black chanterelle mushrooms with thin, dark grey flesh that fades when dry. The fruiting body can reach 12 centimetres (4 3/4 in) tall.

The cap is 1.5–5 cm (1/2–2 in) across, in an irregular funnel shape or infundibuliform. It is irregularly wavy at the edges with an inrolled margin. It is black when moist, brownish whey dry or in age. The stem is 2–8 cm long and up to 1.3 cm thick. It is smooth to lightly velvety in texture, sometimes with a white woolly base. The veins/ridges are dark grey, irregular forks which are distant and decurrent.

The spore print is whitish, while the spores are broadly elliptical, smooth, non-amyloid, and 7.5–10 x 5–6 μm. The taste is mild and the odour indistinct.

=== Similar species ===
Possible lookalikes include Craterellus cornucopioides, Pseudocraterellus undulatus and Faerberia carbonaria, all of which are edible.

== Habitat and distribution ==
As a mycorrhizal species it grows on soil with leaf litter in broadleaf woods and is found singly or in small groups. It is found in coniferous forests in Europe. It has a widespread distribution but is uncommon, being found in winter and early spring in western North America.

== Edibility ==
C. cinereus is an edible mushroom with a good taste. It can be used similarly to black trumpets (C. cornucopioides) but with a milder taste.
