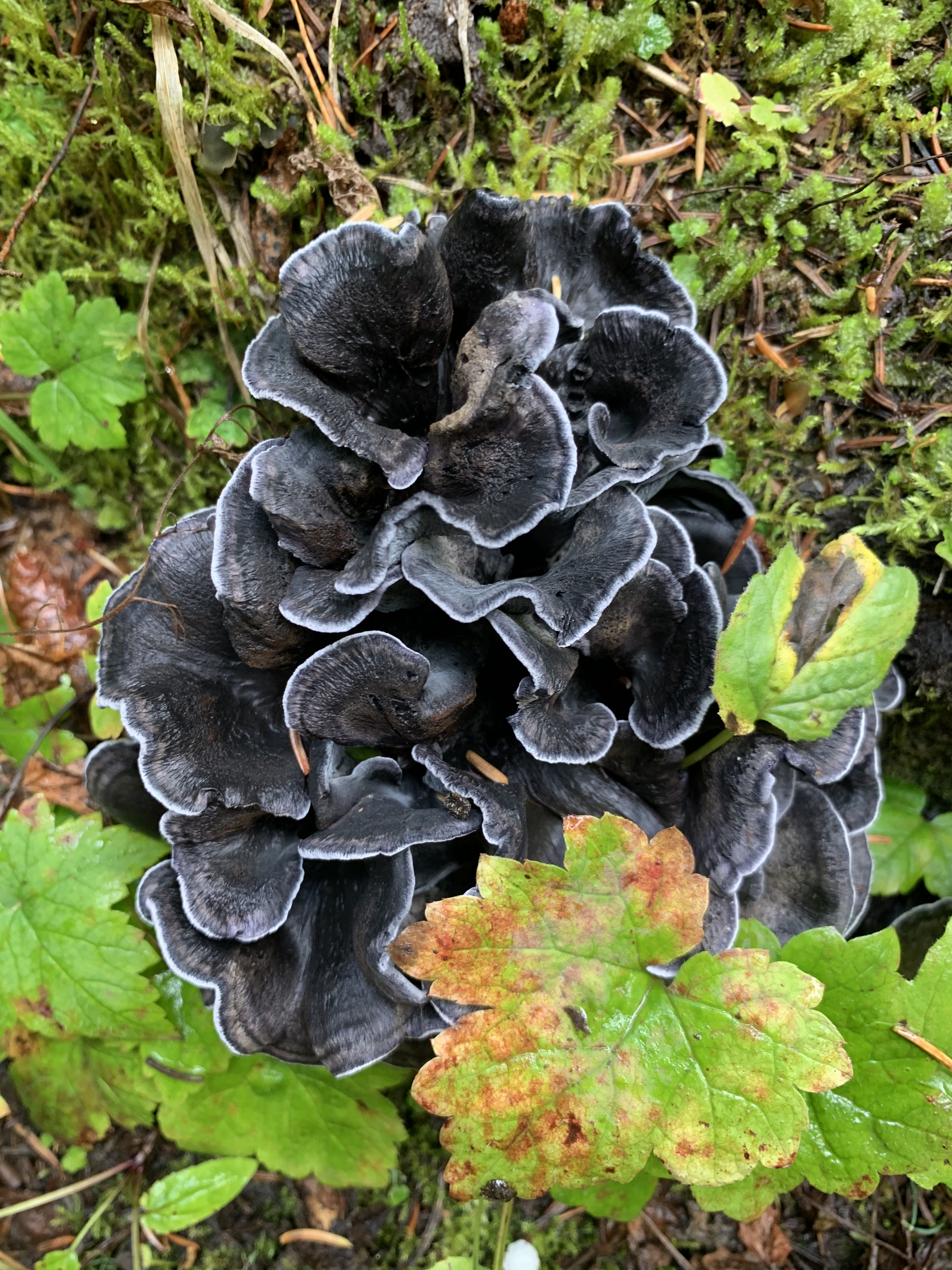

Scientific classification
- Kingdom: Fungi
- Division: Basidiomycota
- Class: Agaricomycetes
- Order: Thelephorales
- Family: Thelephoraceae
- Genus: Polyozellus
- Species: P. atrolazulinus

Binomial name
- Polyozellus atrolazulinus S.A.Trudell & Kõljalg, 2018

= Polyozellus atrolazulinus =

Species of fungus

Polyozellus atrolazulinus is a fungus species of the Thelephoraceae family, that was previously part of the Polyozellus multiplex species complex. This mushroom is a notable bright blue-purple colour, and as a result is frequently used for dyes.
