= Cantharellus splendens =

Scientific classification
- Domain: Eukaryota
- Kingdom: Fungi
- Division: Basidiomycota
- Class: Agaricomycetes
- Order: Cantharellales
- Family: Cantharellaceae
- Genus: Cantharellus
- Species: C. splendens

Binomial name
- Cantharellus splendens Buyck (1994)

Synonyms
- Afrocantharellus splendens (Buyck) Tibuhwa (2012)

Species of fungus

Cantharellus splendens is a species of fungus in the family Cantharellaceae found in Zambia, Burundi and Tanzania. First described in 1994 as a species of Cantharellus, it was transferred to the new genus Afrocantharellus in 2012.
