= Cantharellus symoensii =

Scientific classification
- Domain: Eukaryota
- Kingdom: Fungi
- Division: Basidiomycota
- Class: Agaricomycetes
- Order: Cantharellales
- Family: Cantharellaceae
- Genus: Cantharellus
- Species: C. symoensii

Binomial name
- Cantharellus symoensii Heinem. (1966)

Synonyms
- Afrocantharellus symoensii (Heinem.) Tibuhwa (2012)

Species of fungus

Cantharellus symoensii is a species of fungus in the family Cantharellaceae. First described by mycologist Paul Heinemann in 1966 as a species of Cantharellus, it was transferred to the new genus Afrocantharellus in 2012.
