= Cantharellus fistulosus =

Scientific classification
- Domain: Eukaryota
- Kingdom: Fungi
- Division: Basidiomycota
- Class: Agaricomycetes
- Order: Cantharellales
- Family: Cantharellaceae
- Genus: Cantharellus
- Species: C. fistulosus

Binomial name
- Cantharellus fistulosus Tibuhwa & Buyck (2008)

Synonyms
- Afrocantharellus fistulosus (Tibuhwa & Buyck) Tibuhwa (2012)

Species of fungus

Cantharellus fistulosus is a species of fungus in the family Cantharellaceae. First described in 2008 as a species of Cantharellus, it was transferred to the new genus Afrocantharellus in 2012.
