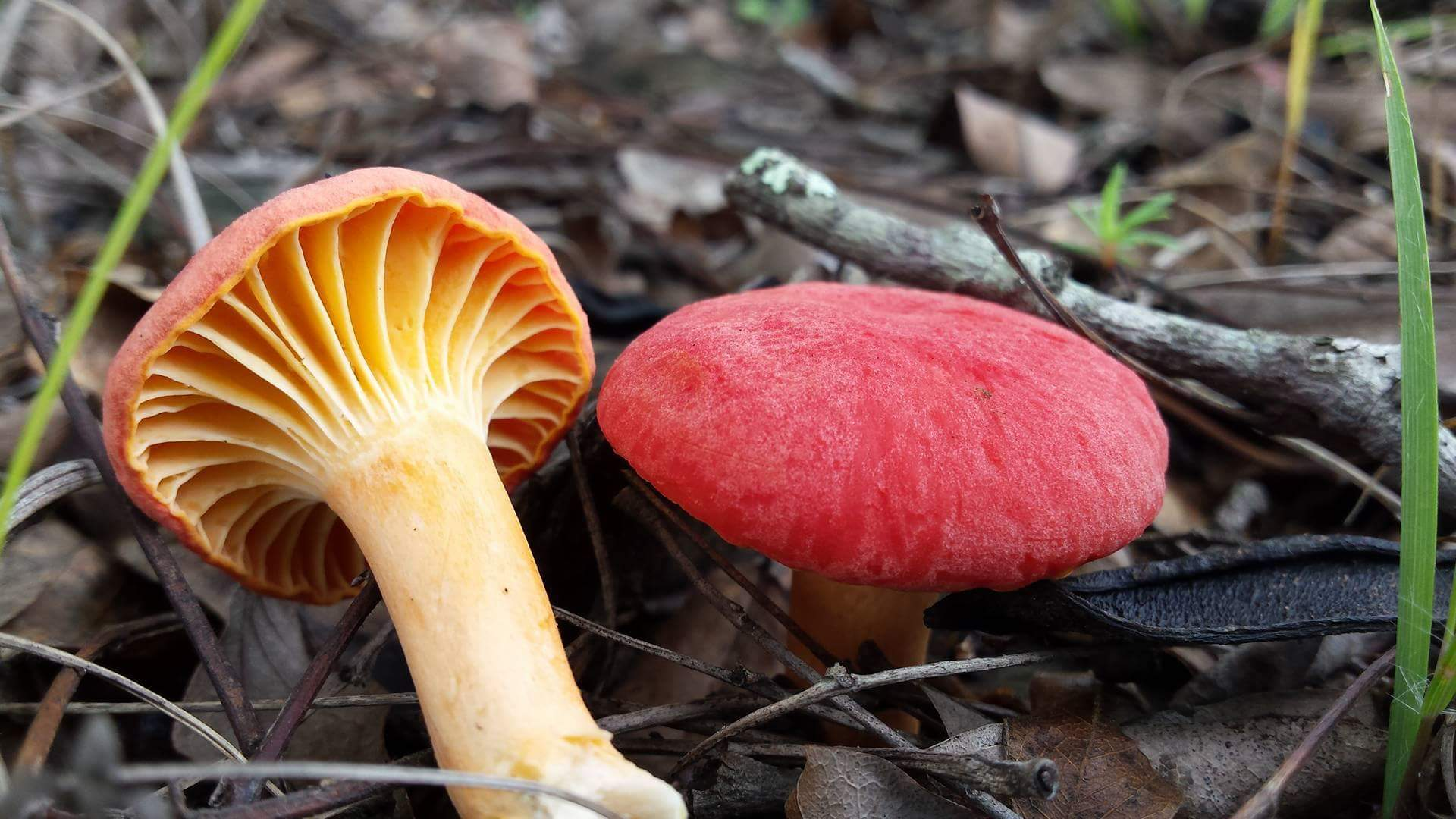

Scientific classification
- Domain: Eukaryota
- Kingdom: Fungi
- Division: Basidiomycota
- Class: Agaricomycetes
- Order: Cantharellales
- Family: Cantharellaceae
- Genus: Cantharellus
- Species: C. platyphyllus

Binomial name
- Cantharellus platyphyllus Heinem. (1966)

Synonyms
- Afrocantharellus platyphyllus (Heinem.) Tibuhwa (2012)

= Cantharellus platyphyllus =

Species of fungus

Cantharellus platyphyllus is a species of fungus in the family Cantharellaceae found in Tanzania. First described in 1966 as a species of Cantharellus, it was transferred to the new genus Afrocantharellus in 2012.

Mycological characteristics
- Gills on hymenium
- Cap is convex
- Edibility is edible
