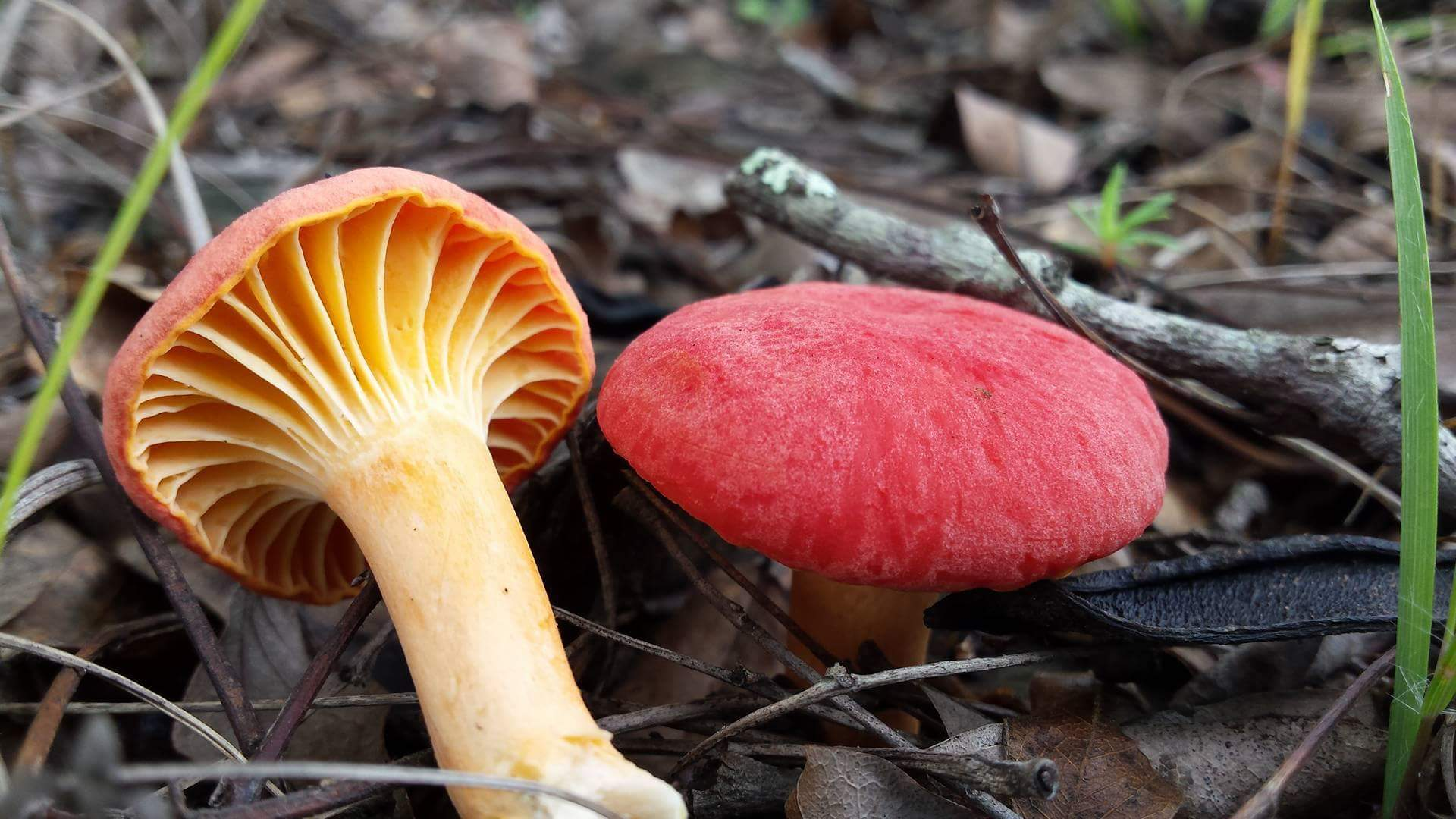
- Afrocantharellus platyphyllus in Tanzania

Scientific classification
- Kingdom: Fungi
- Division: Basidiomycota
- Class: Agaricomycetes
- Order: Cantharellales
- Family: Cantharellaceae
- Genus: Cantharellus
- Subgenus: Cantharellus subg. Afrocantharellus; Essyart. & Buyck (2001)

Type species
- Afrocantharellus symoensii (Heinem.) Tibuhwa (2012)

Species
- See Text

Synonyms
- Afrocantharellus (Eyssart. & Buyck) Tibuhwa (2012)

= Cantharellus subg. Afrocantharellus =

Subgenus of fungi

Cantharellus subg. Afrocantharellus
- Mycological characteristics
- Gills on hymenium
- Cap is convex

Afrocantharellus is a subgenus of fungi in the genus Cantharellus. Species in this subgenus are found in Africa and Asia.

== Taxonomy ==
It was originally named as a subgenus of Cantharellus, but was elevated to the rank of genus Afrocantharellus by Donatha D. Tibuhwa in 2012 based on morphological and molecular evidence. The genus was reverted back to a subgenus by further molecular-based infrageneric classification in a more recent study and this has been followed by other researchers.

=== Species ===
Accepted species:

Image	Scientific name	Year	Mycorrhizal association	Distribution
	C. aurantioconspicuus Wartchow & Buyck	2012		Brazil (Pernambuco)
	C. cerinoalbus Eyssart. & Walleyn	2009		China(Hunan), Malaysia
	C. cineraceus N.K. Zeng, Y.Z. Zhang & Zhi Q. Liang	2023	Castanopsis kawakamii	China(Fujian)
	C. cuticulatus Corner	1966		Malaysia
	C. fistulosus Tibuhwa & Buyck	2008		Tanzania
	C. guyanensis Mont.	1854		French Guyana
	C. platyphyllus Heinem.	1966		Tanzania
	C. hygrophoroides S.C. Shao, Buyck & F.Q. Yu	2014	Castanopsis fissa	China(Hainan, Yunnan)
	C. luteostipitatus Buyck & V. Hofstetter	2015		Madagascar
	C. protectus Wartchow & F.G.B. Pinheiro	2013		Brazil (Paraíba)
	C. splendens Buyck	1994		Congo, Zambia, Burundi and Tanzania
	C. symoensii Heinem.	1966		Tanzania
