= Parastereopsis =

Scientific classification
- Kingdom: Fungi
- Division: Basidiomycota
- Class: Agaricomycetes
- Order: Cantharellales
- Family: Cantharellaceae
- Genus: Parastereopsis; Corner

Type species
- Parastereopsis borneensis Corner

Genus of fungi

Parastereopsis is a genus of fungi in the family Cantharellaceae. It is a monotypic genus, and contains one species, Parastereopsis borneensis, described as new to science by British mycologist E.J.H. Corner in 1976.
