= Kynapcin =

Class of chemical compounds

Skeletal formula of kynapcin-24

Kynapcin is a general name for a number of dibenzofuranyl derivatives of the molecule polyozellin, present in the fungus Polyozellus multiplex. Like polyozellin, some kynapcins inhibit prolyl endopeptidase, an enzyme that has a role in processing proteins including amyloid precursor protein. Chemicals that inhibit prolyl endopeptidase have attracted research interest due to their potential therapeutic effects. Several kynapcins have been found in P. multiplex, each with different chemical properties, including kynapcin-12, kynapcin-13 and -28, and -24. A total synthesis of kynapcin-24 was achieved in 2009.
