= Polyozellin =

Names
- Preferred IUPAC name 2,3,8,9-Tetrahydroxybenzo[1,2-b:4,5-b′]bis([1]benzofuran)-6,12-diyl diacetate

Identifiers
| CAS Number | 197703-46-1 |
| 3D model (JSmol) | Interactive image |
| ChEMBL | ChEMBL458248 |
| ChemSpider | 338925 |
| PubChem CID | 382514 |
| UNII | B7DFS96VZB |
| CompTox Dashboard (EPA) | DTXSID30327611 |
- InChI: InChI=1S/C22H14O10/c1-7(23)29-19-17-9-3-11(25)13(27)5-15(9)31-21(17)22-18(20(19)30-8(2)24)10-4-12(26)14(28)6-16(10)32-22/h3-6,25-28H,1-2H3 Key: NOBAAHRLFGFAOS-UHFFFAOYSA-N; InChI=1/C22H14O10/c1-7(23)29-19-17-9-3-11(25)13(27)5-15(9)32-22(17)20(30-8(2)24)18-10-4-12(26)14(28)6-16(10)31-21(18)19/h3-6,25-28H,1-2H3 Key: NOBAAHRLFGFAOS-UHFFFAOYSA
- SMILES: CC(=O)OC1=C(OC(C)=O)C2=C(OC3=CC(O)=C(O)C=C23)C4=C1C5=CC(O)=C(O)C=C5O4

Properties
| Chemical formula | C_{22}H_{14}O_{10} |
| Molar mass | 438.344 g·mol^{−1} |
- Except where otherwise noted, data are given for materials in their standard state (at 25 °C [77 °F], 100 kPa). verify (what is ?) Infobox references

Polyozellin is a chemical which occurs in the mushroom Polyozellus multiplex. It inhibits prolyl endopeptidase, an enzyme that has a role in processing proteins (specifically, amyloid precursor protein) in Alzheimer's disease. Chemicals that inhibit prolyl endopeptidase have attracted research interest due to their potential therapeutic effects. Structurally related dibenzofuranyl derivatives of polyozellin are known as kynapcins.
