= Goossensia =

Scientific classification
- Kingdom: Fungi
- Division: Basidiomycota
- Class: Agaricomycetes
- Order: Cantharellales
- Family: Cantharellaceae
- Genus: Goossensia; Heinem. (1958)

Type species
- Goossensia cibarioides Heinem. (1958)

Genus of fungi

As established by Cossmann in 1885, Goossensia is a mollusc genus in family Carditidae. As invalidly described by Ragonot in 1891, it refers to the snout moth genus Macna.

Goossensia is a fungal genus in the family Cantharellaceae. It is a monotypic genus, and contains one species, Goossensia cibarioides, found in the Congo. The genus was circumscribed by the Belgian mycologist Paul Heinemann in 1958.

G. cibarioides is a bright yellow-orange mushroom that somewhat resembles the Fragrant Chanterelle (Cantharellus odoratus), but has a very watery stipe. It is edible.
