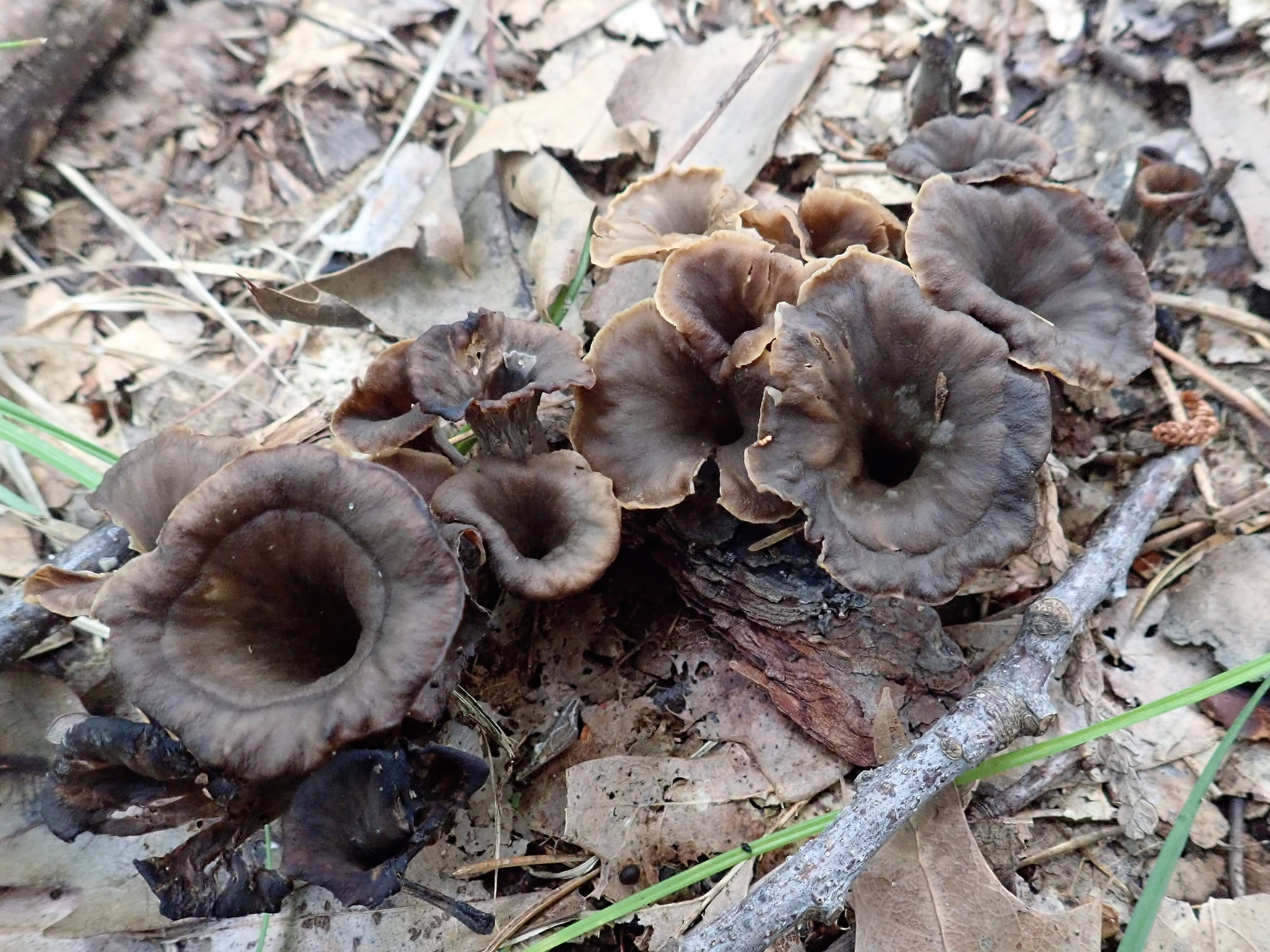

Scientific classification
- Domain: Eukaryota
- Kingdom: Fungi
- Division: Basidiomycota
- Class: Agaricomycetes
- Order: Cantharellales
- Family: Cantharellaceae
- Genus: Craterellus
- Species: C. caeruleofuscus

Binomial name
- Craterellus caeruleofuscus A.H. Sm.

= Craterellus caeruleofuscus =

Species of fungus

Craterellus caeruleofuscus is a species of fungus in the mushroom family Cantharellaceae.
