= Pterygellus =

Scientific classification
- Kingdom: Fungi
- Division: Basidiomycota
- Class: Agaricomycetes
- Order: Cantharellales
- Family: Cantharellaceae
- Genus: Pterygellus; Corner

Type species
- Pterygellus armeniacus Corner

Species
- P. armeniacus P. cymatodermoides P. funalis P. polymorphus P. spiculosus

Genus of fungi

Pterygellus is a genus of fungi in the family Cantharellaceae. It was circumscribed by the British mycologist E.J.H. Corner in 1966. According to the Dictionary of the Fungi (10th edition, 2008), the genus contains five species found in tropical Asia.
