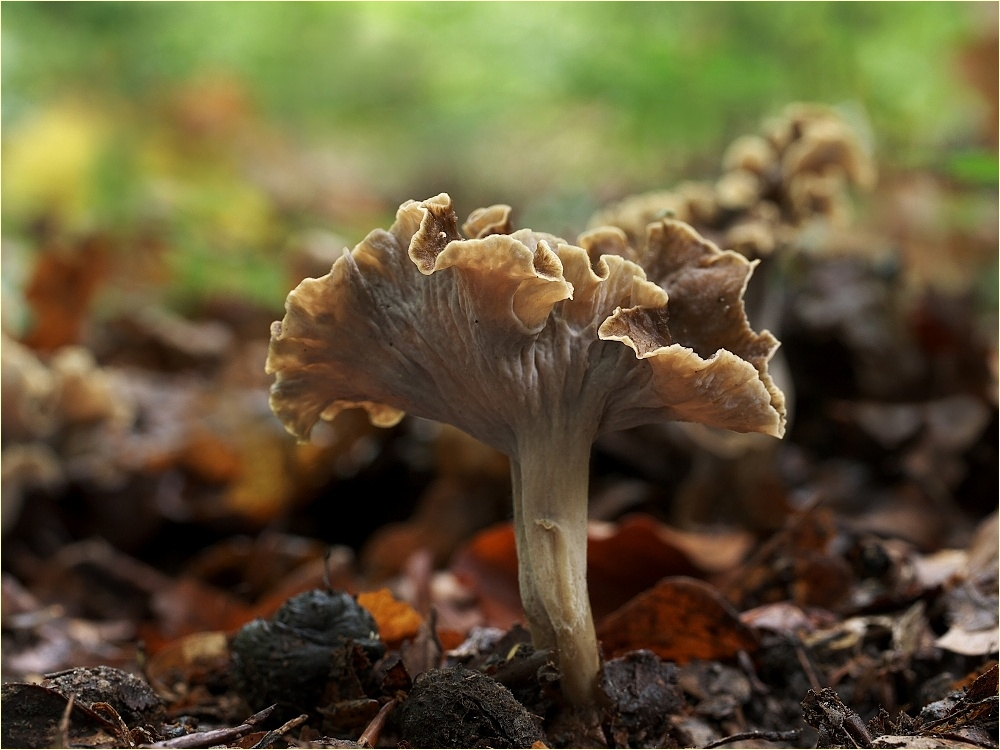
- Pseudocraterellus undulatus

Scientific classification
- Domain: Eukaryota
- Kingdom: Fungi
- Division: Basidiomycota
- Class: Agaricomycetes
- Order: Cantharellales
- Family: Hydnaceae
- Genus: Pseudocraterellus; Corner (1958)

Type species
- Pseudocraterellus sinuosus (Fr.) Corner (1958)

Species
- P. alutaceus P. calyculus P. luteus P. neotropicalis P. pertenuis P. sinensis P. subundulatus P. undulatus

= Pseudocraterellus =

Genus of fungi

Pseudocraterellus is a genus of fungi in the family Cantharellaceae.
