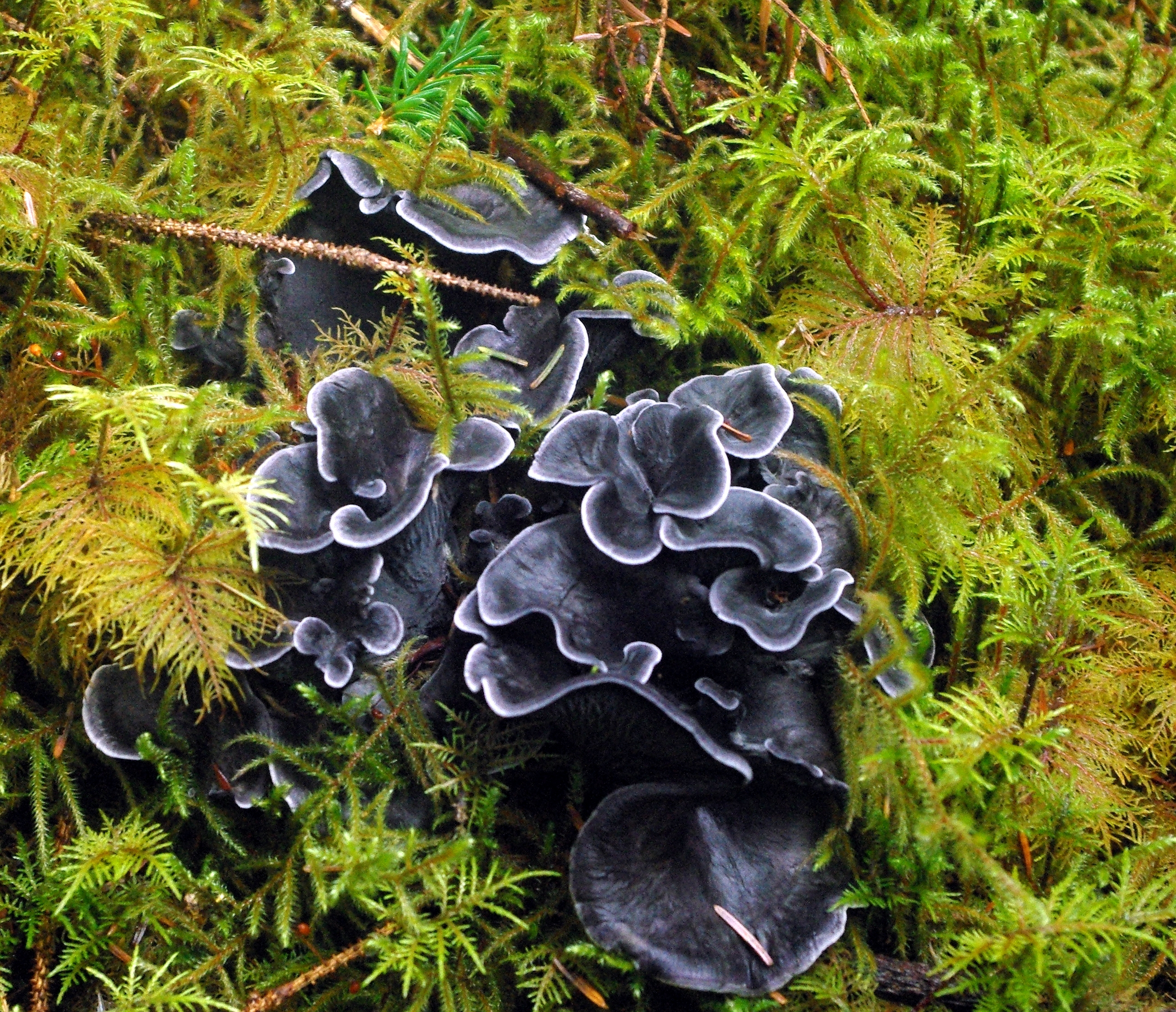

Conservation status
- Apparently Secure (NatureServe)

Scientific classification
- Kingdom: Fungi
- Division: Basidiomycota
- Class: Agaricomycetes
- Order: Thelephorales
- Family: Thelephoraceae
- Genus: Polyozellus; Murrill (1910)
- Species: P. multiplex

Binomial name
- Polyozellus multiplex (Underw.) Murrill (1910)

Synonyms
- Cantharellus multiplex Underw. (1899); Phyllocarbon yasudai Lloyd (1921); Craterellus multiplex (Underw.) Shope (1938); Thelephora multiplex (Underw.) S.Kawam. (1954)

= Polyozellus multiplex =

Species of fungus

Polyozellus multiplex
- Mycological characteristics
- Ridges on hymenium
- Cap is infundibuliform
- Hymenium attachment is irregular or not applicable
- Stipe is bare
- Spore print is white
- Ecology is mycorrhizal
- Edibility is edible

Polyozellus multiplex is a species complex of fungi first described in 1899. P. multiplex is commonly known as the blue chanterelle, the purple chanterelle, or, in Alaska, the black chanterelle. However, this mushroom is not closely related to true chanterelles. The fruiting bodies of this species are blue- to purple-colored clusters of vase- or spoon-shaped caps, with veiny wrinkles on the underside which run down the length of the stem.

The species may be found growing on the ground in coniferous forests, usually under spruce and fir trees. It is an edible species and has been harvested for commercial purposes. It contains the bioactive compound polyozellin, which has been shown to have various beneficial physiological properties, including suppressive effects on stomach cancer.

== Taxonomy ==
Polyozellus multiplex is part of the group of fungi collectively known as cantharelloid mushrooms (which includes the genera Cantharellus, Craterellus, Gomphus, and Polyozellus), because of the similarity of their fruiting structures and the morphology of the spore-producing region (the hymenophore) on the underside of the caps.

While the name used to refer to a group of species, it is now used to describe only one. P. multiplex was considered the monotypic species of the genus Polyozellus until recent molecular research divided the species complex into five species. The genus name is derived from the Greek poly meaning many, and oz, meaning branch. The specific epithet multiplex means "in many pieces", referring to the compound nature of the fruiting body.

== Description ==
The fan- or funnel-shaped fruit bodies of the black chanterelle grow clustered together on the ground. These clusters are typically 15 centimetres (6 in) tall and 30 cm (11.8 in) wide, with masses exceptionally reaching diameters of up to 1 meter (3.3 ft).

The individual caps, 3–8 cm (1.2–3.1 in) wide, are violet-black, with edges that a re initially whitish, and with a glaucous surface—a white powdery accumulation of spore deposit. The upper surface may be zonate—lined with what appear to be multiple concentric zones of texture caused by areas of fine hairs (a tomentum)—and the edges of the caps are lobed and wavy with a layer of very fine hairs. The underside of the caps bears the fertile, spore-producing tissue called the hymenium, which typically has shallow, crowded wrinkles or veins that are roughly the same color or paler than the cap surface. Some variation in color has been observed depending on the collection location. For example, specimens found in Alaska are more likely to be jet-black in color with a dark gray underside.

The stem is dark purplish-black with a smooth (glabrous) and dry surface; the stems are often fused at the base. The stem is typically up to 5 cm (2.0 in) long and 1.5–7 cm (0.6–2.8 in) wide. The flesh is dark violet, soft but breaking easily. The spore print is white.

=== Microscopic characteristics ===
The spores are roughly spherical to broadly ellipsoid in shape, covered with small wart-like projections (tubercules), and have dimensions of 6–8.5 by 5.5–8 μm. Viewed microscopically, they are hyaline, meaning they appear translucent or colorless. Chemical tests may also be used to help distinguish the spores: in the presence of potassium hydroxide (KOH), the spores turn slightly green; the spores are not amyloid, meaning they do not take iodine when treated with Melzer's reagent; and the spores are acyanophilous, meaning they do not readily absorb methyl blue stain. The cystidia that comprise the hymenium are filamentous and 3–4 μm wide by 28–40 μm long. The outer tissue layer of the cap—the cuticle, or pileipellis—is made of interwoven hyphae, and stains olive-green in KOH. Clamp connections are present, but not at all the cell partitions. The basidia, the spore-bearing cells, are 32–38 by 5–6 μm and four-spored.

=== Similar species ===
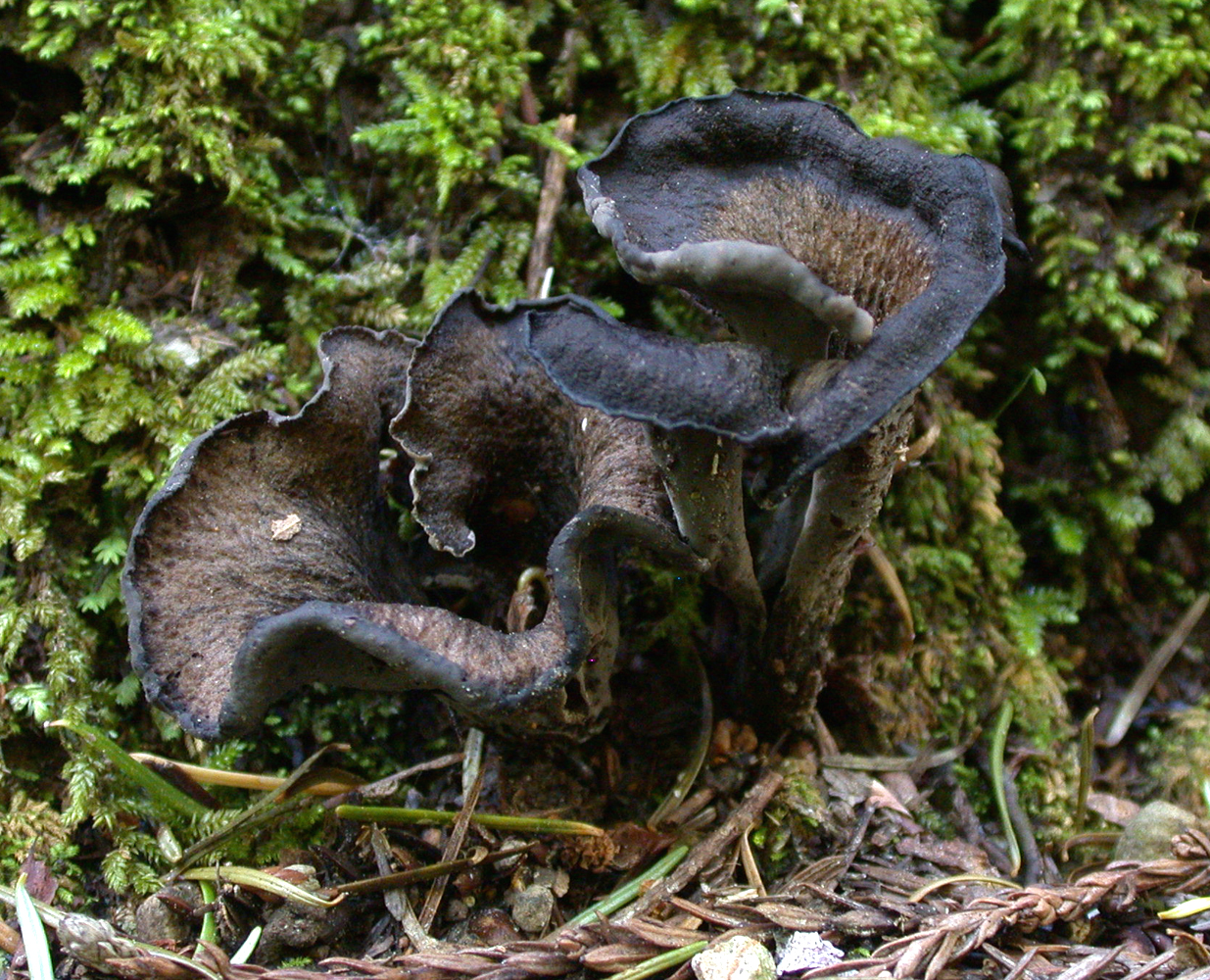
Craterellus cornucopioides, a lookalike species

The horn-of-plenty mushroom (Craterellus cornucopioides) also has a blackish fruit body and a smooth hymenium, but is distinguished from P. multiplex by its thin flesh, a trumpet- or tubular-shaped fruit body (rather than fan- or spoon-shaped), and grey to black colors. A closely related species, the fragrant chanterelle (Cantharellus odoratus), also tends to grow in dense clusters, but it is orange rather than blue. Craterellus caeruleofuscus does not form compound clusters, and is not restricted to coniferous forests. The pig's ear Gomphus, species Gomphus clavatus, is similar in shape and form but fleshier, and light violet to pink.

Other species of Polyozellus are easy to mistake for P. multiplex, as prior to 2018, the genus was thought to be monotypic, but was split into 5 species. Species are mainly distinguished by location, with P. multiplex only being confirmed on the Eastern coast. Other species like P. astrolazulinus, P. mariae, and P. marimargaretae have also been identified on the East coast and therefore identification may be more difficult in regions of overlap.

== Habitat and distribution ==
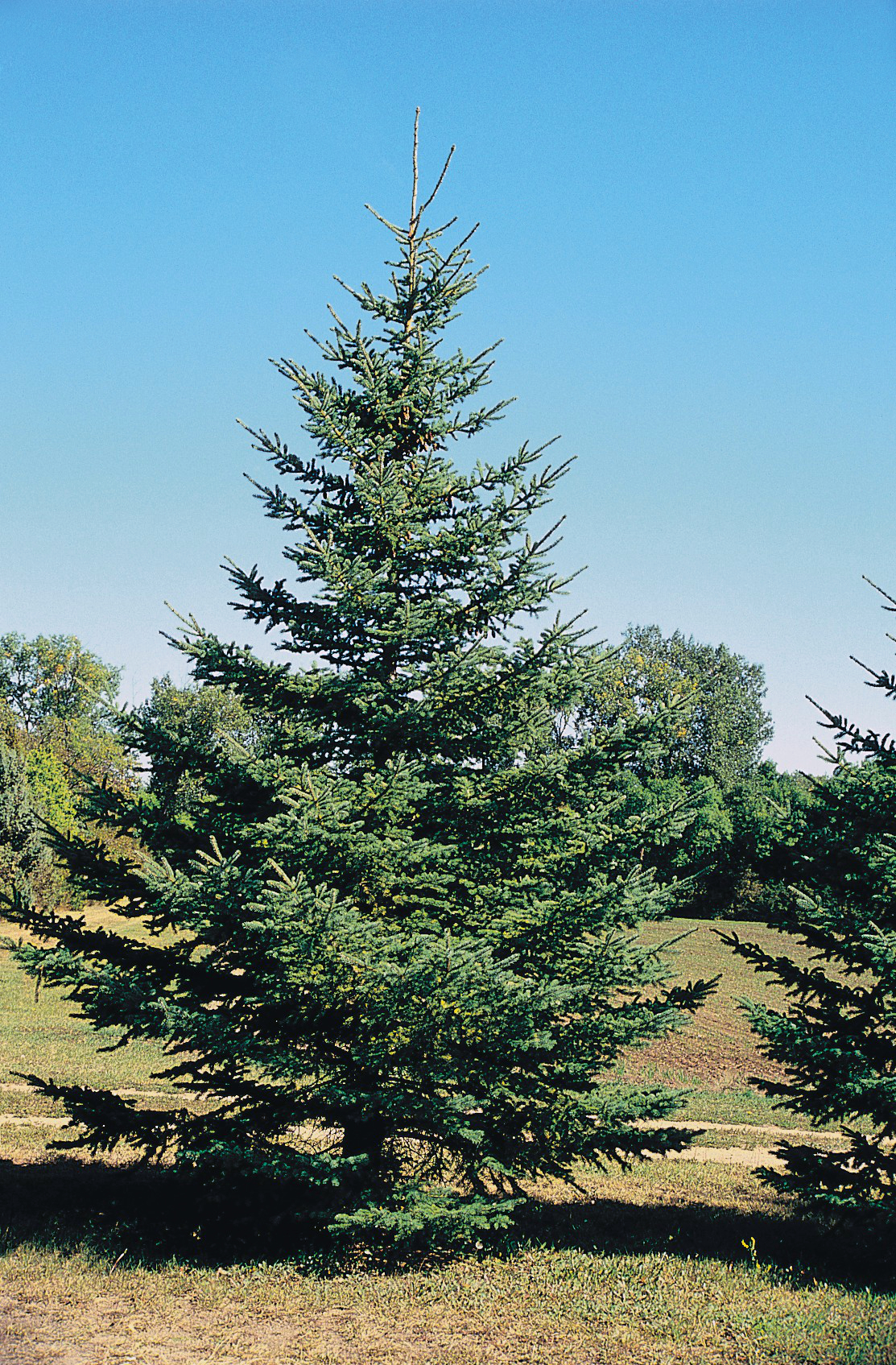
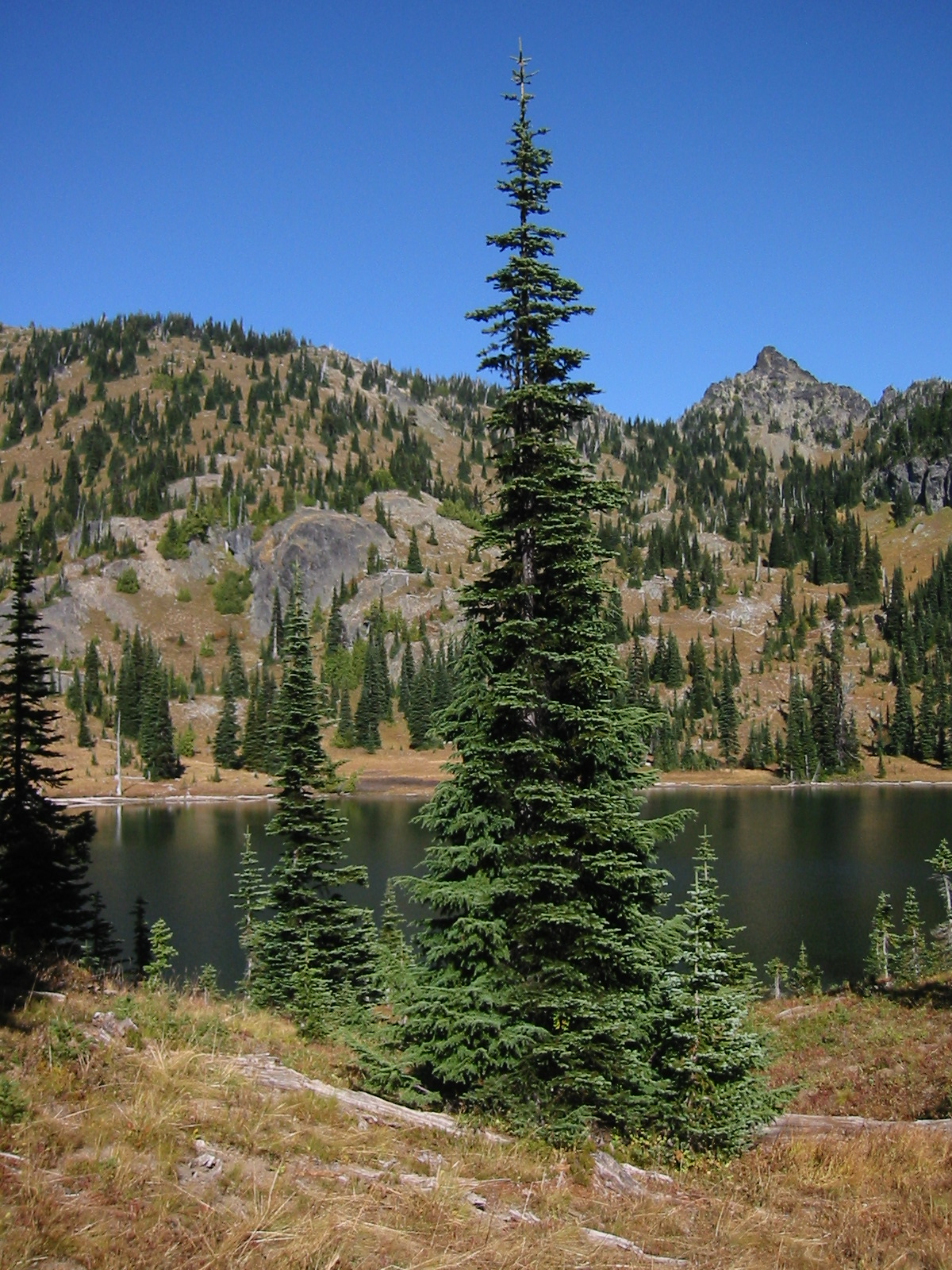
Polyozellus grows in a mycorrhizal association with conifers like spruce (example left) and fir (right).

Polyozellus multiplex is an ectomycorrhizal species, meaning that the hyphae of the fungus grow in a mutualistic association with the roots of plants, but the fungal hyphae generally do not penetrate the cells of the plant's roots. The species grows in coniferous woods under spruce and fir, and more frequently at higher elevations. It is most often encountered in summer and fall.

This species is northern and alpine in distribution, and rarely encountered. Collections have been made in the United States (including Maine, Oregon, Colorado, New Mexico, and Alaska), Canada (Quebec and British Columbia), China, Japan, and Korea. In North America, collections are still being re-catalogued to reflect the separation of the 5 species of Polyozellus. The disjunct distribution of this species in North America and East Asia has been noted to occur in a number of other fungal species as well. P. multiplex is also found in the Queen Charlotte Islands, where it is commercially harvested.

== Uses ==
=== Edibility ===
Polyozellus multiplex is edible, and is collected for sale in Asian countries such as Korea, Japan, and China. In North America, it is sometimes collected recreationally and commercially. The taste is described as mild and the odor as mild or aromatic. Mycologist David Arora claims the flavor to be inferior to Craterellus. It can be prepared by cooking. The fruit bodies may be preserved by drying.

=== Bioactive compounds ===
Skeletal formula of polyozellin

The compound polyozellin—a chemical which can be isolated and purified from P. multiplex—inhibits prolyl endopeptidase (PEP), an enzyme that has a role in processing proteins (specifically, amyloid precursor protein) in Alzheimer's disease. Chemicals that inhibit PEP have attracted research interest due to their potential therapeutic effects. Further analyses of extracts from P. multiplex revealed similar dibenzofuranyl derivatives of polyozellin, each with different chemical properties, including kynapcin-12, kynapcin-13 and -28, and -24. A total synthesis of kynapcin-24 was achieved in 2009.

=== Antitumor properties ===
Research conducted in 2003 suggests that extracts from P. multiplex may have suppressive effects on stomach cancer. The study showed that feeding a low concentration (0.5% or 1%) of the mushroom extract enhanced the activities of the enzymes glutathione S-transferase and superoxide dismutase, and increased the abundance of the molecule glutathione. The extract also augmented the expression of the protein p53. All of these substances protect the human organism against cancer. Additional studies reported in 2004 and 2006 attribute anti-tumor properties to polyozellin.
