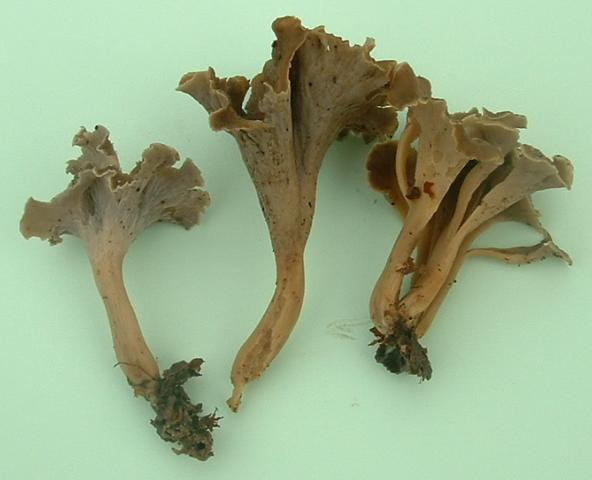

Scientific classification
- Kingdom: Fungi
- Division: Basidiomycota
- Class: Agaricomycetes
- Order: Cantharellales
- Family: Hydnaceae
- Genus: Pseudocraterellus
- Species: P. undulatus

Binomial name
- Pseudocraterellus undulatus (Pers.) Rauschert

= Pseudocraterellus undulatus =

Species of fungus

Pseudocraterellus undulatus
- Mycological characteristics
- Ridges on hymenium
- Cap is infundibuliform
- Hymenium is decurrent
- Stipe is bare
- Spore print is white to yellow
- Ecology is mycorrhizal
- Edibility is edible

Pseudocraterellus undulatus is a species of fungus belonging to the family Hydnaceae. It has the common name sinuous chanterelle.

Synonym:

- Merulius undulatus Pers., 1801 (basionym)
- Pseudocraterellus sinuosus (Fr.) Corner, 1958

== Description ==
Pseudocraterellus undulatus is a small funnel shaped mushroom with tough grey flesh.

Cap: 1–5 cm. Starts as convex or depressed but quickly becomes funnel shaped/infundibuliform with irregular edges and wrinkles. Hymenium is wrinkled and branching, greyish-brown in colour with distant spacing and decurrent attachment. Stem: 3–6 cm. Tapers downwards and is often grooved and twisted with adjacent mushrooms fusing together above the base. Spore print: White to pale yellow. Spores: Broadly ellipsoid, smooth, non-amyloid. 9.5–12 x 7–8 μm. Taste: Mild. Smell: Faint and indefinite.

== Habitat and distribution ==
Grows on soil and amongst leaf litter in broad-leaved woods. It is a mycorrhizal species which is especially associated with beech, hazel and oak trees. Can grow as a solitary mushroom or in small groups which may be attached to one another. It is widespread but only occasionally found and may grow from Summer to Autumn.

== Edibility ==
Whilst P. undulatus is regarded as an edible mushroom with a mild taste; it may grow too rarely to justify picking.
