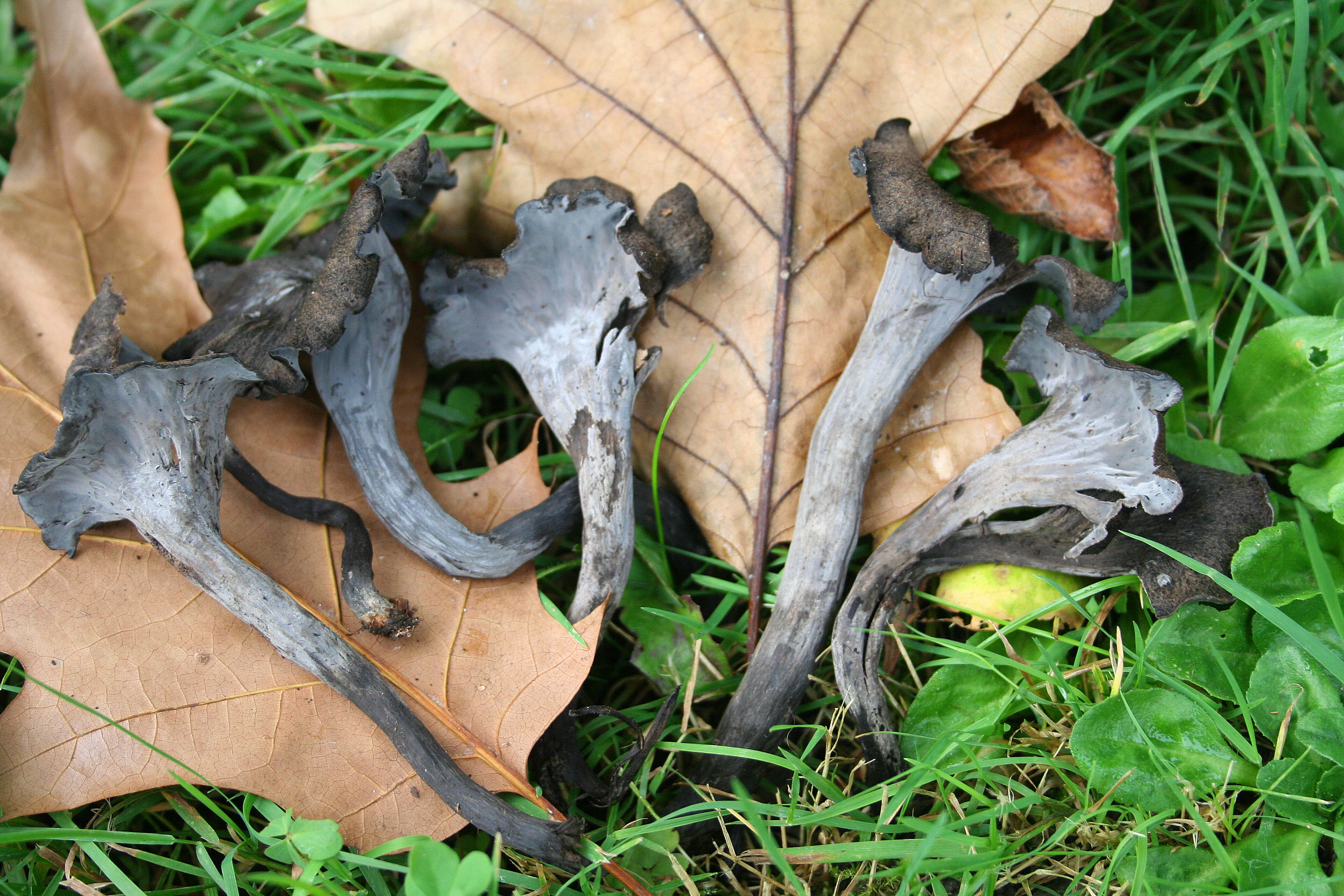

Conservation status
- Least Concern (IUCN 3.1)

Scientific classification
- Kingdom: Fungi
- Division: Basidiomycota
- Class: Agaricomycetes
- Order: Cantharellales
- Family: Cantharellaceae
- Genus: Craterellus
- Species: C. cornucopioides

Binomial name
- Craterellus cornucopioides (L.) Pers.

= Craterellus cornucopioides =

Craterellus cornucopioides
- Mycological characteristics
- Ridges on hymenium
- Cap is infundibuliform
- Hymenium is decurrent
- Stipe is bare
- Spore print is cream to buff
- Ecology is mycorrhizal
- Edibility is choice

Craterellus cornucopioides is a species of fungus commonly known as the horn of plenty, black chanterelle, black trumpet, or trumpet of the dead. It forms a funnel-shaped grayish mushroom, which is found in Eurasia, North America, and Australia. It is edible.

== Description ==
The fruiting body is shaped like a funnel expanded at the top, the stalk seamless with the cap, which is 0.5–8 centimetres (1/4–3 1/4 inches) wide. They grow up to about 10 cm (4 in) in height, exceptionally 15 cm (6 in). The upper and inner surface is black or dark gray, and rarely yellow. The lower and outer fertile surface is a much lighter shade of gray. The fertile surface is more or less smooth but may have decurrent wrinkles. It may have a dusting of spores, which are buff in deposit.

The size of the elliptical spores is in the range of 8–11 μm × 5–7 μm. The basidia are two-spored.

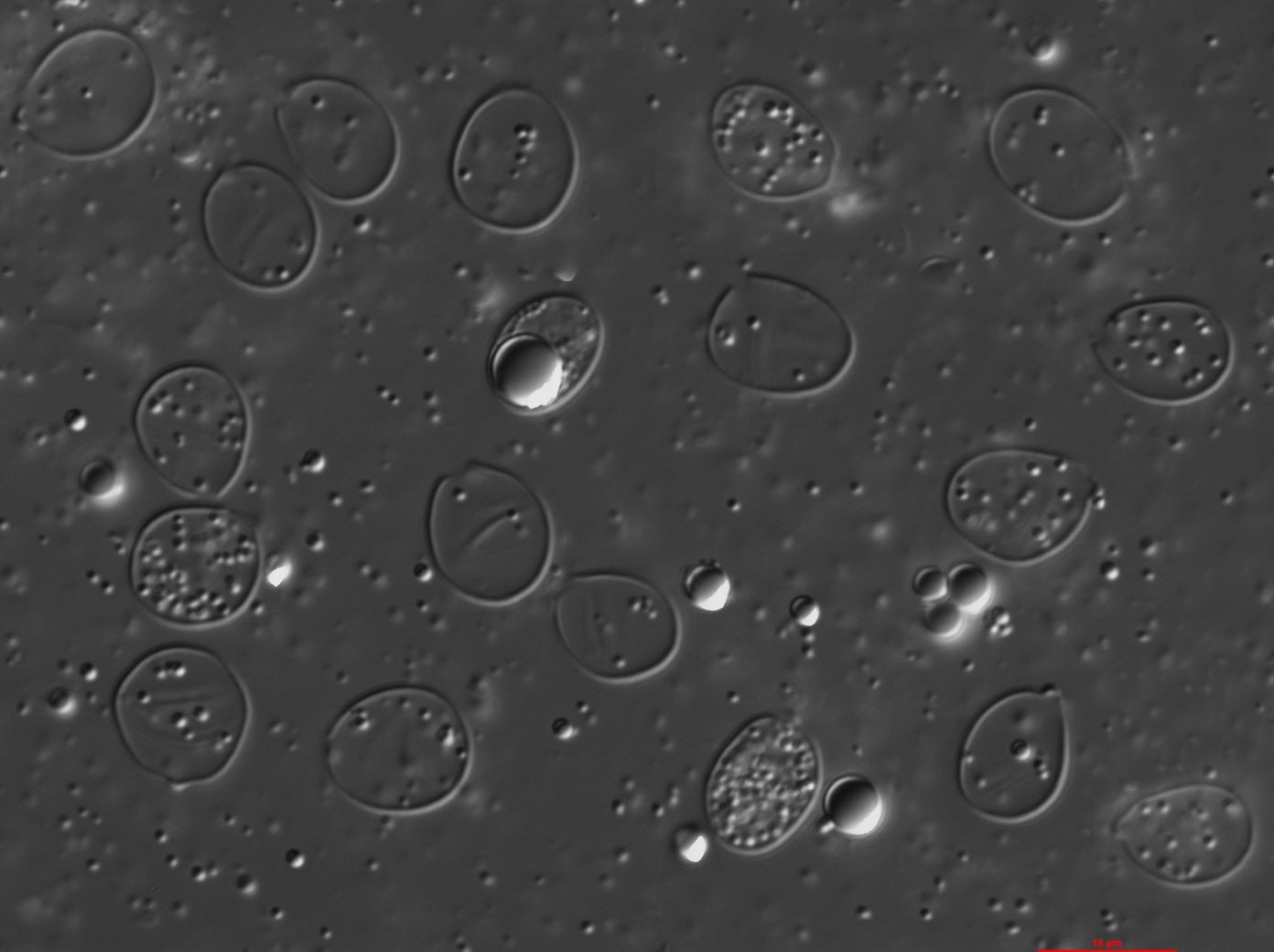
Spores 1000x

=== Similar species ===
Craterellus cornucopioides has a smooth spore-bearing surface, but the rare, distantly related Cantharellus cinereus has rudimentary gills. The colour and smooth undersurface make C. cornucopioides very distinctive.

The forms Craterellus fallax (with a different spore colour en masse) and C. konradii (with a yellowish fruiting body) have been defined as separate species, but DNA studies now show that the latter should be considered part of C. cornucopioides.

Polyozellus multiplex has a purplish tint and Craterellus sinuosus tends to be more wrinkled beneath with yellower spores.

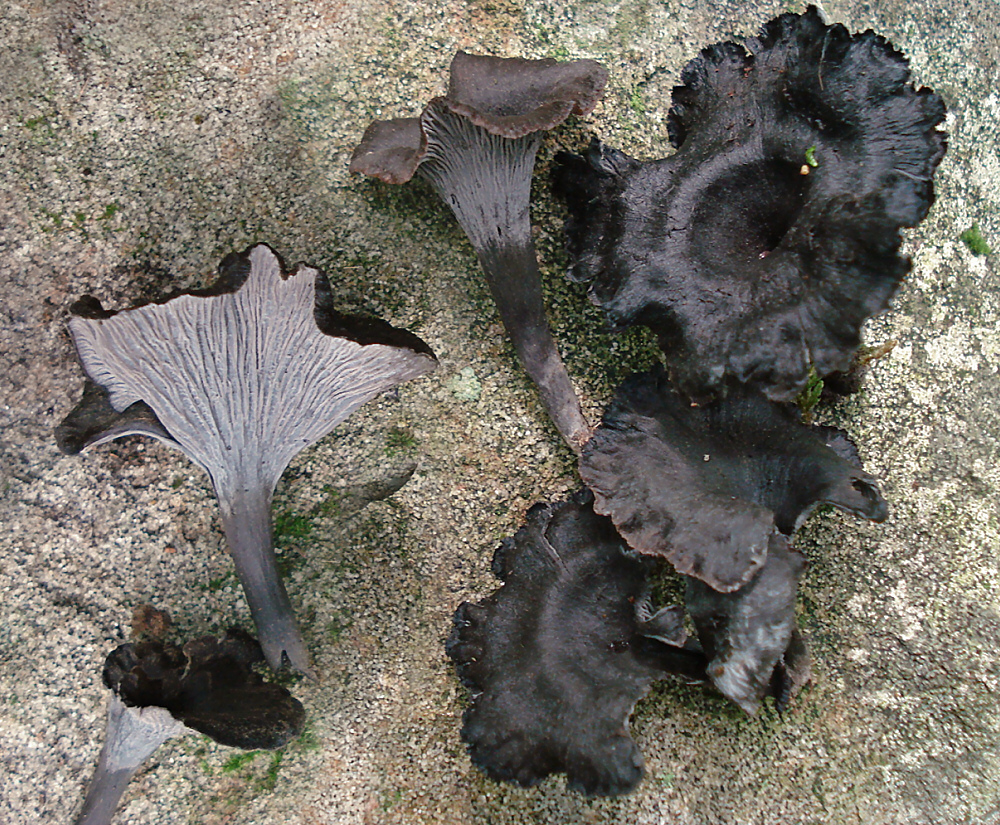
Cantharellus cinereus

== Distribution and habitat ==
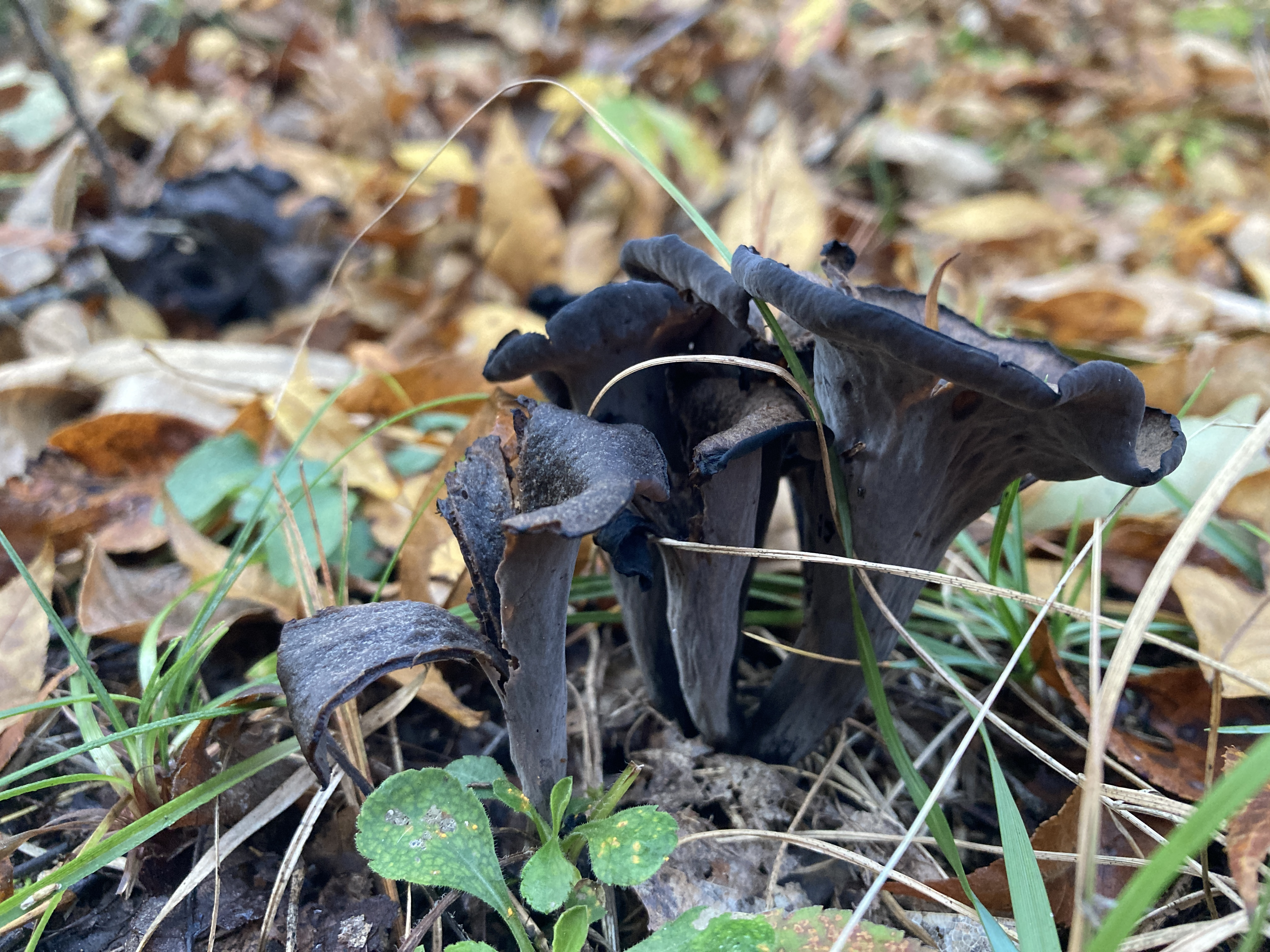
On the forest floor in the Catskills, New York

This fungus is found in woods in Europe, East Asia, North America, and Australia. In the American Pacific Northwest, it grows from November to March. It mainly grows under beech, oak or other broad-leaved trees, especially in moss in moist spots on heavy calcareous soil. In Europe it is generally common, but seems to be rare in some countries such as the Netherlands. It appears from June to November, and in the United Kingdom, from August to November. In Australia, they grow in rainforest gullies, often associated with Northofagus spp., appearing from January to May.

Because the mushroom tends to be blackish, it easily blends in with leaf litter on the forest floor. Some who hunt the species say it is like looking for black holes in the ground. It grows in groups.

== Uses ==
Despite their unpalatable appearance, horns of plenty are edible and choice. According to a Portuguese study, 100 grams of dried C. cornucopioides contain 69.45 g of protein, 13.44 g of carbohydrates (mostly mannitol, a sugar alcohol) and 4.88 g of fat, amounting to 378 calories. They contain fatty acids, primarily of the polyunsaturated variety, as well as phenols, flavonoids and 87 mg of vitamin C. Along with Cantharellus cibarius (golden chanterelles) they are also a significant source of biologically active vitamin B12, containing 1.09–2.65 μg/100 g dry weight.

When dried, C. cornucopioides acquires black truffle notes; in this form it can be crumbled as a condiment.

== In culture ==
The Cornucopia, in Greek mythology, referred to the magnificent horn of the nymph Amalthea's goat (or of herself in goat form), that filled itself with whatever meat or drink its owner requested. It has become the symbol of plenty.

A possible origin for the name "trumpet of the dead" is that the growing mushrooms were seen as being played as trumpets by dead people under the ground. This name is translated to trompette de mort (French) and trompeta de la mort (Catalan).

It is one of several species that may be called djondjon in Haitian.
