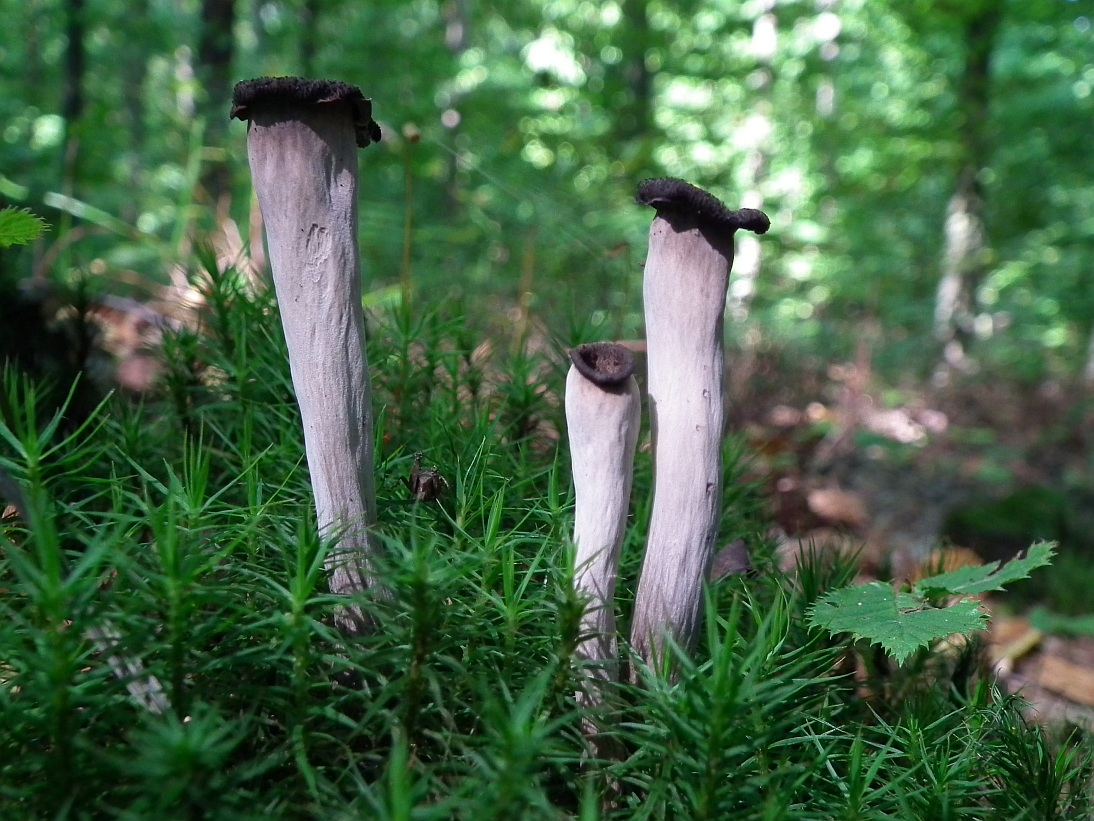
- Craterellus cornucopioides

Scientific classification
- Kingdom: Fungi
- Division: Basidiomycota
- Class: Agaricomycetes
- Order: Cantharellales
- Family: Cantharellaceae
- Genus: Craterellus; Pers. (1825)

Type species
- C. cornucopioides (L.) Pers. (1825)

Synonyms
- Fungoidaster P.Micheli (1729); Trombetta Adans. (1763); Pezicula Paulet (1791); Sterbeeckia Dumort. (1822)

= Craterellus =

Genus of edible fungi

Craterellus
- Mycological characteristics
- Ridges on hymenium
- Cap is infundibuliform
- Hymenium is decurrent
- Stipe is bare
- Spore print is cream to salmon
- Ecology is mycorrhizal
- Edibility is choice

Craterellus is a genus of generally edible fungi similar to the closely related chanterelles, with some new species recently moved from the latter to the former. Both groups lack true gills on the underside of their caps, though they often have gill-like wrinkles and ridges.

== General ==
The three most common species, C. cornucopioides, C. lutescens and C. tubaeformis, are gathered commercially and, unlike Cantharellus, can be easily preserved by drying.

Molecular phylogenetics have been applied to the problem of discriminating between Craterellus and Cantharellus genera. Results indicate that the presence of a hollow stipe may be a synapomorphy (a trait corresponding to the evolutionary relationship) which reliably identifies Craterellus species. C. cornucopioides appears to be a single polymorphic species, while C. tubaeformis may be two separate genetic groups separated by geography.

== Definition of the genus ==
- - - - - - - C. cornucopioides
            - C. odoratus
          - Pseudocraterellus sinuosus
        - C. lutescens
      - - C. ignicolor
        - western C. tubaeformis
    - eastern C. tubaeformis
  - Cantharellus ssp.

Phylogenetic relationships of some Craterellus species and the genus Cantharellus based on DNA sequences. C. tubaeformis as previously described is two separate genetic groups, corresponding to Europe-eastern North America and western North America.

The genera Craterellus and Cantharellus have always been recognized as closely related. The whole group may be recognized by their lack of division into cap and stipe, and their rudimentary or missing gills ("false gills"). Originally Cantharellus was defined by Fries in 1821 to mean all these species together and then in 1825 Persoon separated some species off to create the Craterellus group, with Cr. cornucopioides as type species. Since then some authorities have tried to merge the two genera again, but DNA studies now indicate that (with recent changes) each genus is monophyletic, and so they are likely to remain separate.

In the past Craterellus was distinguished on the basis that

1. the fruiting body had a hollow stipe, generally being funnel-shaped, and
2. there were no clamp connections.

But phylogenetic DNA work starting with the 2000 paper of Dahlman et al. has shown that some species traditionally placed in Cantharellus (C. tubaeformis, C. ignicolor and C. lutescens) really belong in Craterellus, and this means that the second distinguishing rule is no longer valid. On the other hand, the first rule holds up well.

== Species ==
The taxonomy of these fungi is in a state of flux (particularly due to DNA analysis) and many earlier names are now disputed. The following table gives some of the most important ones. Numerous species of Cantharellus have at times been classified under Craterellus, but these are mostly excluded from the table. See also the cladogram at right for a portrayal of the relationships between the species based on recent evidence.

Image	Name	Current status	Further details
	C. caeruleofuscus A.H. Sm. (1968)	Valid.	With blue or purplish shades, growing in sphagnum around the Great Lakes.
	C. calicornucopioides D.Arora & J.L.Frank (2015)	Valid	Closely related to similar European species C. cornucopioides, but separated on the basis of molecular phylogenetics.
	C. cornucopioides (L.) Pers. (1825)	Valid	Type species of the genus.
	C. excelsus T.W. Henkel & Aime (2009)	Valid	Described in 2009 from Guyana.
	C. fallax A.H. Sm. (1968)	May be synonym of C. cornucopioides.	If separated from C. cornucopioides, this is on the basis of its geography and the colour of the underside.
Craterellus ignicolor R.H. Peterson (1965)	C. ignicolor (R.H. Petersen) Dahlman, Danell & Spatafora (2000)	Synonym of Cantharellus ignicolor	Although the paper of Dahlman et al., and also one reference of Kuo, puts this in Craterellus, it seems currently to be in Cantharellus. It is very similar to C. tubaeformis but the cap is yellow to orange. C. ignicolor is edible.
	Cantharellus infundibuliformis (Scop.) Fr. (1838)	Synonym of C. tubaeformis.	In the past the species infundibuliformis has been separated from tubaeformis on the basis of spore print colour and spore size, but molecular analysis shows that the distinction is not justified. When this species name was in use it was as Cantharellus, but if reintroduced now it would have to be as Craterellus.
	C. konradii Bourdot & Maire (1930)	Synonym of C. cornucopioides.	If separated from C. cornucopioides, it is distinguished by a yellowish (rather than black) coloration.
	C. lutescens (Fr.) Fr. (1838)	Valid	Closely associated with C. tubaeformis, this species has less well-developed lamellae.
	C. tubaeformis (Fr.) Quél. (1888)	Valid	This common species (sometimes called "yellowfoot") has relatively well-developed gills, a greyish cap, and a hollow yellow stipe. It was moved from Cantharellus to Craterellus due to DNA studies. Those found in western N. America may be a different species from those in Europe and eastern North America.
