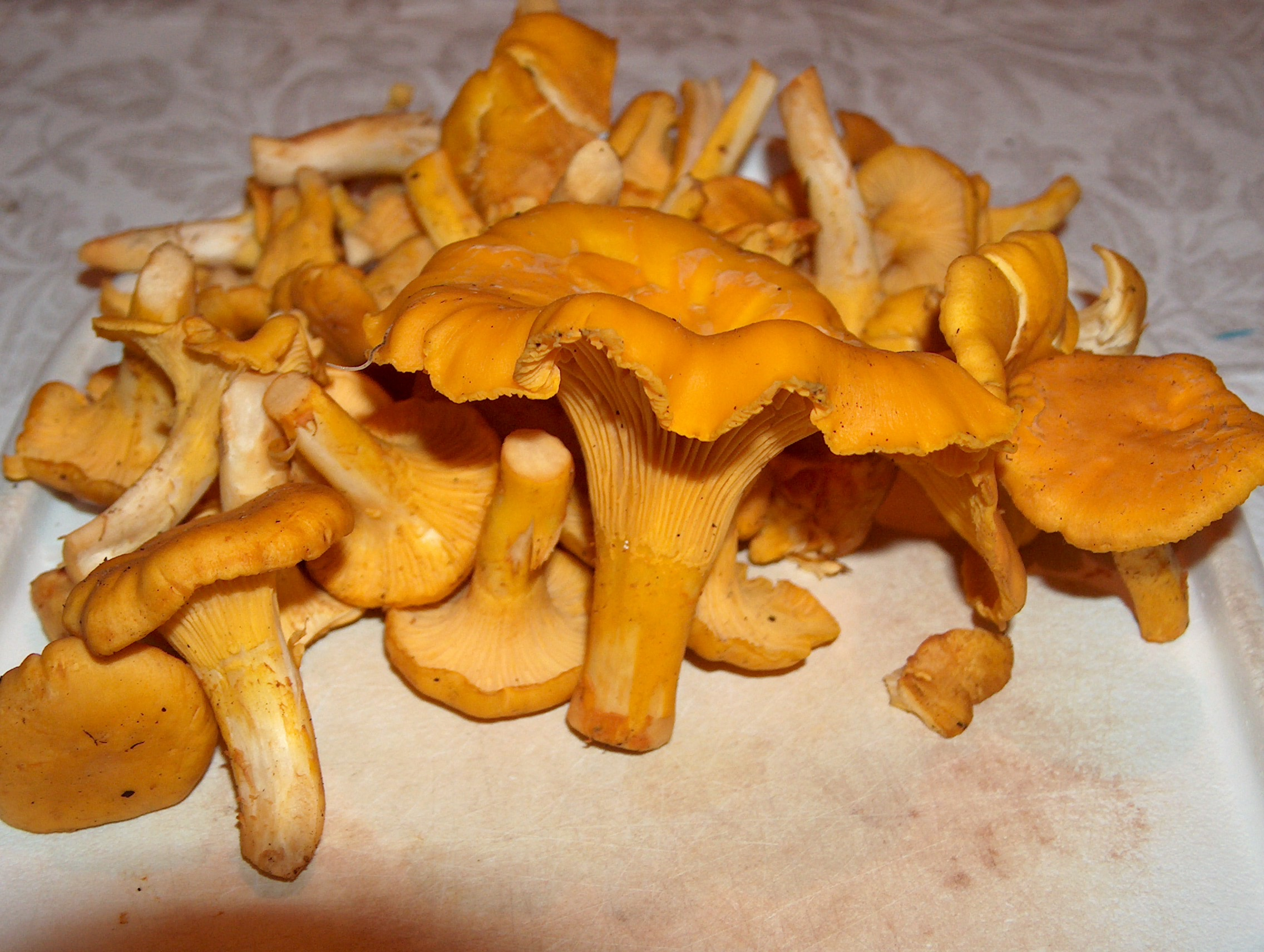
- The chanterelle (Cantharellus cibarius)

Scientific classification
- Kingdom: Fungi
- Division: Basidiomycota
- Class: Agaricomycetes
- Order: Cantharellales
- Family: Cantharellaceae; J. Schröt. (1888)

Type genus
- Cantharellus Adans. ex Fr.

Genera
- Cantharellus; Craterellus; Goossensia; Parastereopsis; Pseudocraterellus; Pterygellus

Synonyms
- Craterellaceae Herter (1910)

= Cantharellaceae =

Family of fungi

The Cantharellaceae are a family of fungi in the order Cantharellales. The family contains the chanterelles and related species, a group of fungi that superficially resemble agarics (gilled mushrooms) but have smooth, wrinkled, or gill-like hymenophores (spore-bearing undersurfaces). Species in the family are ectomycorrhizal, forming a mutually beneficial relationship with the roots of trees and other plants. Many of the Cantharellaceae, including the chanterelle (Cantharellus cibarius), the Pacific golden chanterelle (Cantharellus formosus), the horn of plenty (Craterellus cornucopioides), and the trumpet chanterelle (Craterellus tubaeformis), are not only edible, but are collected and marketed internationally on a commercial scale.

== Taxonomy ==
=== History ===
The family was originally described in 1888 by German mycologist Joseph Schröter to accommodate the chanterelles, which at that time were thought to be an evolutionary link between "primitive" Thelephora species with smooth hymenophores (spore-bearing surfaces) and more "advanced" Agaricus species with gilled hymenophores. In 1903, French mycologist René Maire proposed a new classification system that emphasized the possession of "stichic" basidia (basidia with nuclear spindles arranged longitudinally), a characteristic of the Cantharellaceae that linked the family to the Hydnaceae and Clavulinaceae. This led Ernst Albert Gäumann to include the genus Hydnum (the hedgehog fungi) within the Cantharellaceae. In his 1964 survey of fungal families, Dutch mycologist Marinus Anton Donk limited the Cantharellaceae to Cantharellus and Craterellus species, together with some close tropical associates, and this disposition was widely accepted.

=== Current status ===
Molecular research, based on cladistic analysis of DNA sequences, has confirmed Donk's circumscription of the Cantharellaceae, though the smaller genera have not yet been sequenced. According to a standard 2008 reference work, the family contains 5 genera and over 90 species worldwide.

== Description ==
Fruit bodies of most species in the family are mushroom-like or trumpet-like, with spore-bearing surfaces that are smooth, wrinkled, veined, or gill-like and that are typically decurrent (running down the upper stem). The consistency is fleshy, the hyphal system being monomitic (consisting of generative hyphae only). The basidia are comparatively large and often have more than the standard 4 sterigmata. Spores are smooth and white to yellowish or pinkish in deposit.

== Habitat and distribution ==
All species within the Cantharellaceae are believed to be ectomycorrhizal, forming a mutually beneficial relationships with the roots of living trees and other plants. Basidiocarps typically occur on the ground or in leaf litter in woodland. The family has a cosmopolitan distribution, though the majority of species are tropical. Afrocantharellus, segregated as a genus distinct from Cantharellus in 2012, has four species found only in Africa.

== Economic importance ==
Many species of Cantharellus, Craterellus, and Goossensia are edible and several are collected and marketed on a commercial scale. In Europe, the commercial species are Cantharellus cibarius, Craterellus cornucopioides, and Craterellus tubaeformis which are sold fresh, dried, or canned and are either sourced in Europe or imported, mainly from China. Various African Cantharellus species (often collected in miombo woodlands) are also imported into Europe and marketed as "chanterelles". In North America, Cantharellus formosus is an additional, widely marketed species. The global trade in species of the Cantharellaceae has been estimated (2005) to be worth over £1bn (US$1.5bn) per year.
