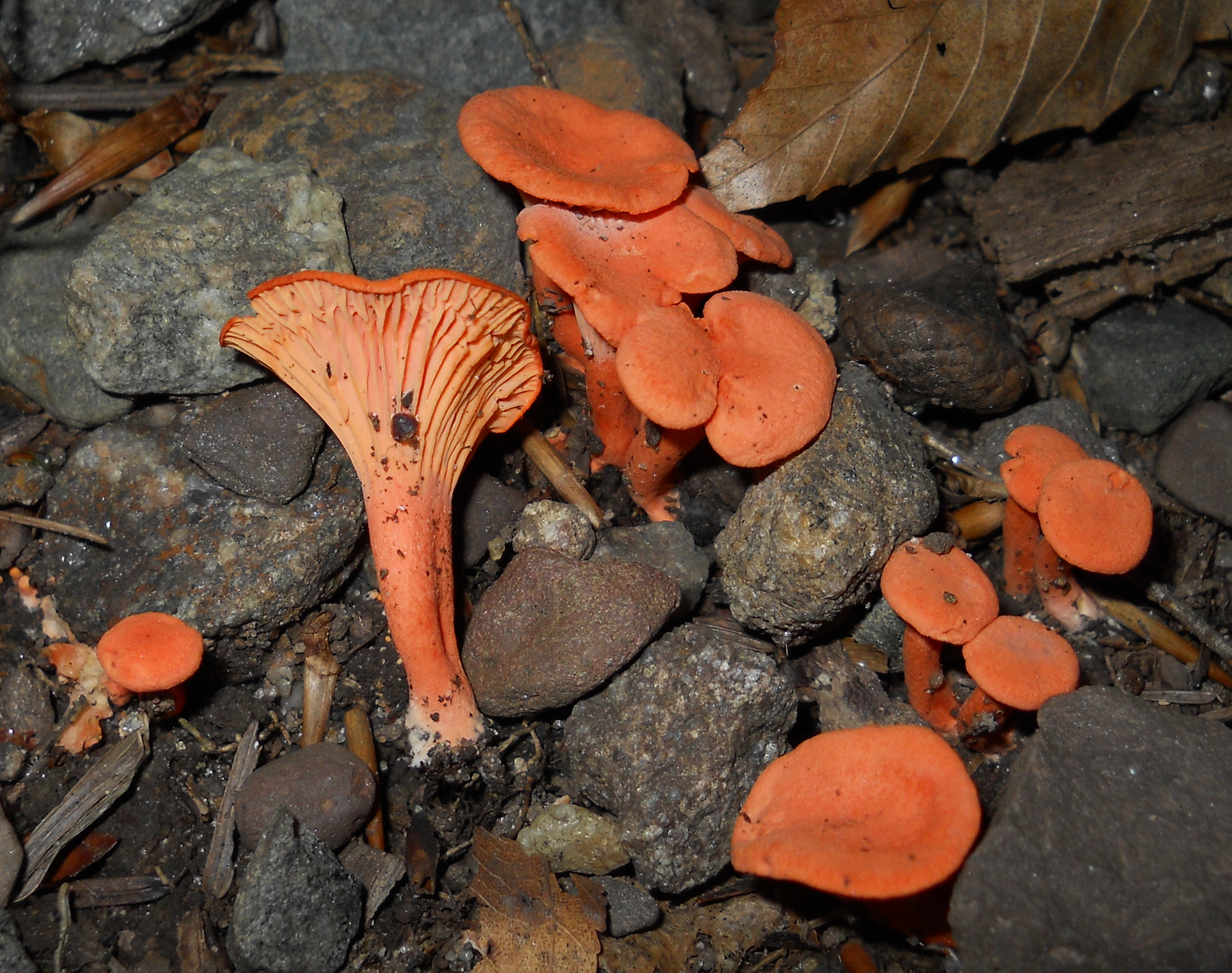

Scientific classification
- Kingdom: Fungi
- Division: Basidiomycota
- Class: Agaricomycetes
- Order: Cantharellales
- Family: Cantharellaceae
- Genus: Cantharellus
- Subgenus: Cantharellus subg. Cinnabarinus; Buyck & V. Hofst. 2013

Type species
- Cantharellus cinnabarinus (Schwein.) Schwein. 1832

Species
- See Text

= Cantharellus subg. Cinnabarinus =

Subgenus of fungi

Cantharellus subg. Cinnabarinus
- Mycological characteristics
- Gills on hymenium
- Cap is convex
- Edibility is edible

Cinnabarinus is a subgenus of fungi in the genus Cantharellus.

== Description ==
This subgenus has mainly small species with orange, pink or red tint. They have thin-walled hyphal ends at the cap surface.

== Taxonomy ==
The subgenus was established in 2013 based on phylogenetic analysis with Cantharellus cinnabarinus designated as the type species,

=== Species ===
Accepted species:

Image	Scientific name	Year	Mycorrhizal association	Distribution
	C. afrocibarius Buyck & Hofsetter	2012		Tanzania, Congo
	C. albovenosus Buyck, Antonín & Ryoo, in Antonín, Hofstetter, Ryoo, Ka and Buyck	2017	Castanea crenata, Larix kaempferi	China (Jiangsu), South Korea
	C. atrolilacinus Eyssart., Buyck & Halling	2003	Quercus corrugata	Costa Rica
	C. chrysanthus Ming Zhang, C.Q. Wang & T.H. Li	2022		China (Guangdong, Guizhou)
	C. cinnabarinus (Schwein.) Schwein. red chantrelle	1832	hardwood	eastern North America
	C. citrinus Buyck, R. Ryoo & Antonín	2020		China(Guizhou), South Korea
	C. coccolobae Buyck, P.A. Moreau & Courtec.,	2016	Coccoloba	the Caribbean, the Bahamas, and Florida
	C. concinnus Berk.	1878	Casuarina, Eucalyptus	the Australian chanterelle
	C. conspicuus Eyssartier, Buyck & Verbeken	2002	Brachystegia spiciformis, Lonchocarpus sericeus, Pterocarpus santalinoides	Zimbabwe, Congo
	C. corallinus Buyck & V. Hofsetter	2016		United States (Missouri)
	C. cyanoxanthus R. Heim ex Heinem.	1958		Congo
	C. cyphelloides Suhara & S. Kurogi	2015		Japan
	C. decolorans Eyssart. & Buyck.	1999		Madagascar
	C. diminutivus Corner	1970		Malaysia
	C. friesii Quél. the orange chanterelle	1872		Asia and Europe
	C. garnieri Ducousso & Evssart	2004	Acacia, Nothofagus	New Caledonia
	C. longisporus Heinem.	1958		Sub-Saharian Africa, Madagascar
	C. phloginus S.C. Shao & P.G. Liu, in Shao, Buyck, Tian, Liu and Geng	2016	Pinus and Castanopsis	China (Yunnan)
	C. sinocinnabarinus Ming Zhang, S.C. Shao & T.H. Li sp.	2022	Quercus delavayi, Pinus yunnanensis	China (Yunnan)
	C. subcyanoxanthus Buyck	2012		Madagascar
	C. texensis Buyck & V. Hofstetter	2011		southeastern United States
	C. variabilicolor Buyck, Randrianj. & V. Hofst.	2015		Madagascar
