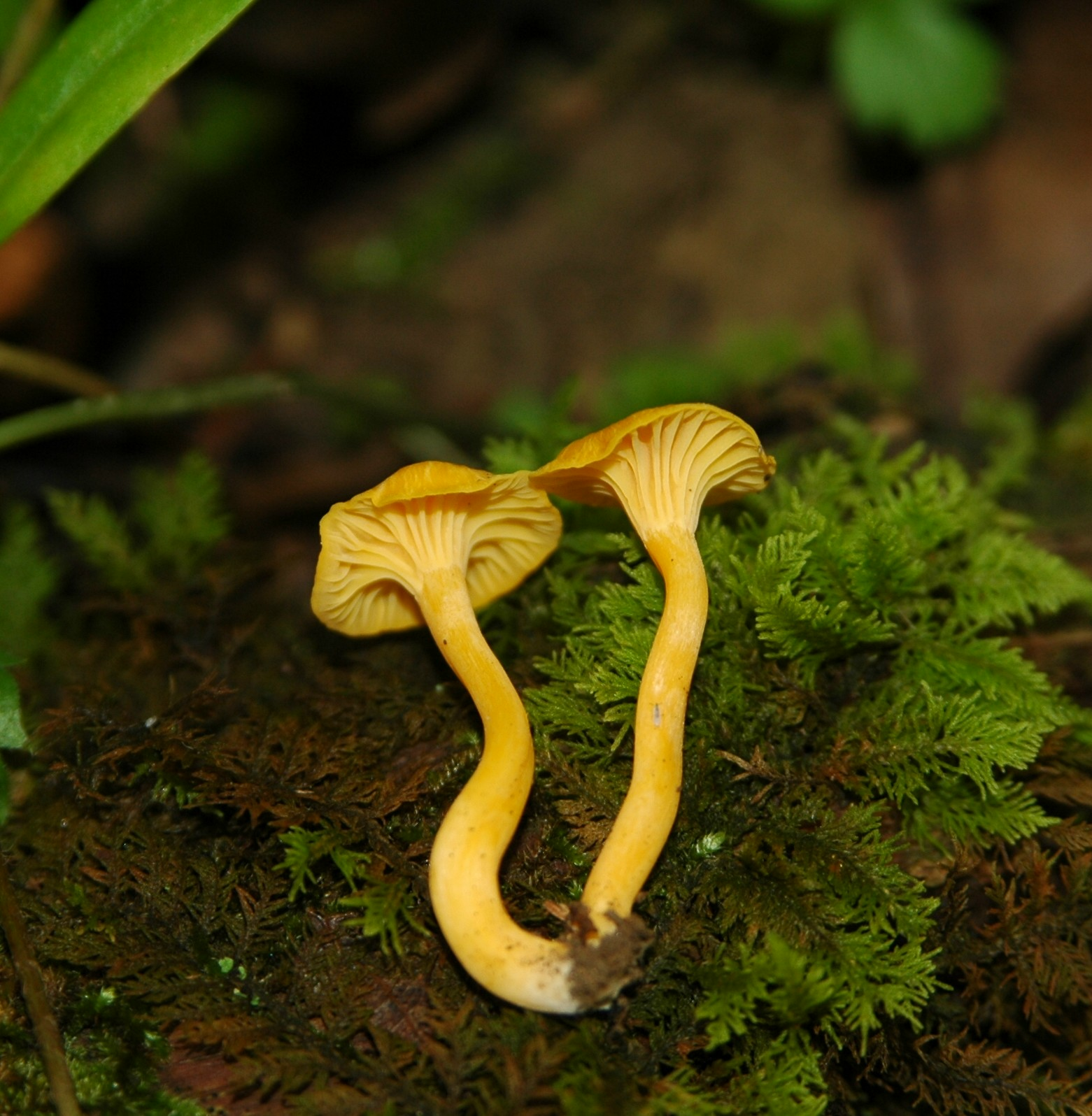
- Cantharellus minor

Scientific classification
- Kingdom: Fungi
- Division: Basidiomycota
- Class: Agaricomycetes
- Order: Cantharellales
- Family: Cantharellaceae
- Genus: Cantharellus
- Subgenus: Cantharellus subg. Parvocantharellus; Eyssart. & Buyck

Type species
- Cantharellus romagnesianus Eyssart. & Buyck 2013

Species
- See text

= Cantharellus subg. Parvocantharellus =

Subgenus of fungi

Cantharellus subg. Parvocantharellus
- Mycological characteristics
- Gills on hymenium
- Cap is convex
- Edibility is edible

Parvocantharellus is a subgenus of fungi in the genus Cantharellus. Species in this subgenus are found in North America, Asia and Africa.

== Description ==
The stipe is slender and yellow to brown. Clamp connections are abundant.

== Taxonomy ==
The subgenus was established in 2013 based on phylogenetic analysis.

=== Species ===
Image	Scientific name	Year	Mycorrhizal association	Distribution
	C. albus S.P. Jian & B. Feng	2020		China (Yunnan)
	C. amazonensis Wartchow	2012	Coccoloba uvifera	Brazil
	C. appalachiensis R.H. Petersen	1971	hardwoods	eastern North America, China
	C. austrosinensis Ming Zhang, C.Q. Wang & T.H. Li	2021	Pinus massoniana	China (Guangdong)
	C. aurantinus Ming Zhang, Z.H. Zhang & T.H. Li	2021		China (Henan, Jiangsu)
	C. avellaneus Pat.	1924		Madagascar
	C. congolensis Beeli	1928		Tanzania
	C. convexus Ming Zhang & T.H. Li	2022	Castanopsis hystrix	China (Guangdong)
	C. curvatus Buyck, R. Ryoo & Antonín	2020	Pinus densiflora, Castanea crenata	South Korea
	C. galbanus Ming Zhang, C.Q. Wang & T.H. Li	2021		China (Hainan)
	C. koreanus Buyck, Antonín & R. Ryoo	2017	Pinus densiflora, Acer palmatum	South Korea
	C. luteolus Ming Zhang, C.Q. Wang & T.H. Li	2021		China (Hainan)
	C. luteovirens Ming Zhang, C.Q. Wang & T.H. Li	2021		China (Guangdong)
	C. minioalbus Ming Zhang, C.Q. Wang & T.H. Li	2021		China (Yunnan)
	C. minor Peck	1872	Vateria indica, Diospyros malabarica, Hopea parviflora, Myristica	Eastern North America, India
	C. neopersicinus Ming Zhang, T.H. Li & X.Y. Chen	2022		China (Guangdong)
	C. nigrescens Buyck, Randrianj. & V. Hofst.	2015		Madagascar
	C. pseudominimus Eyssart. & Buyck	1999		France
	C. parvoflavus M. Herrera, Bandala & Montoya	2021	Quercus oleoides	Mexico (Veracruz)
	C. queletii (Ferry) Corner	1966		Italy
	C. romagensianus Eyssart. and Buyck	1999	Pinus radiata, Frangula alnus, Castanea sativa	France, Spain
	C. sinominor Ming Zhang, C.Q. Wang & T.H. Li	2021		China (Guizhou)
	C. subminor T. Cao & H. S. Yuan	2021		China (Yunnan)
	C. subcyanoxanthus Buyck, Randrianjohany & Eyssart.	2012		Tanzania, Burundi, Madagascar
	C. tabernensis Feib. & Cibula	1996	Pinus elliottii	southern United States
	C. xanthocyaneus Ndolo Ebika & Buyck	2020		Congo
	C. zangii X.F. Tian, P.G. Liu & Buyck	2012	Abies forrestii, Abies densa	China (Yunnan), India (Sikkim)
