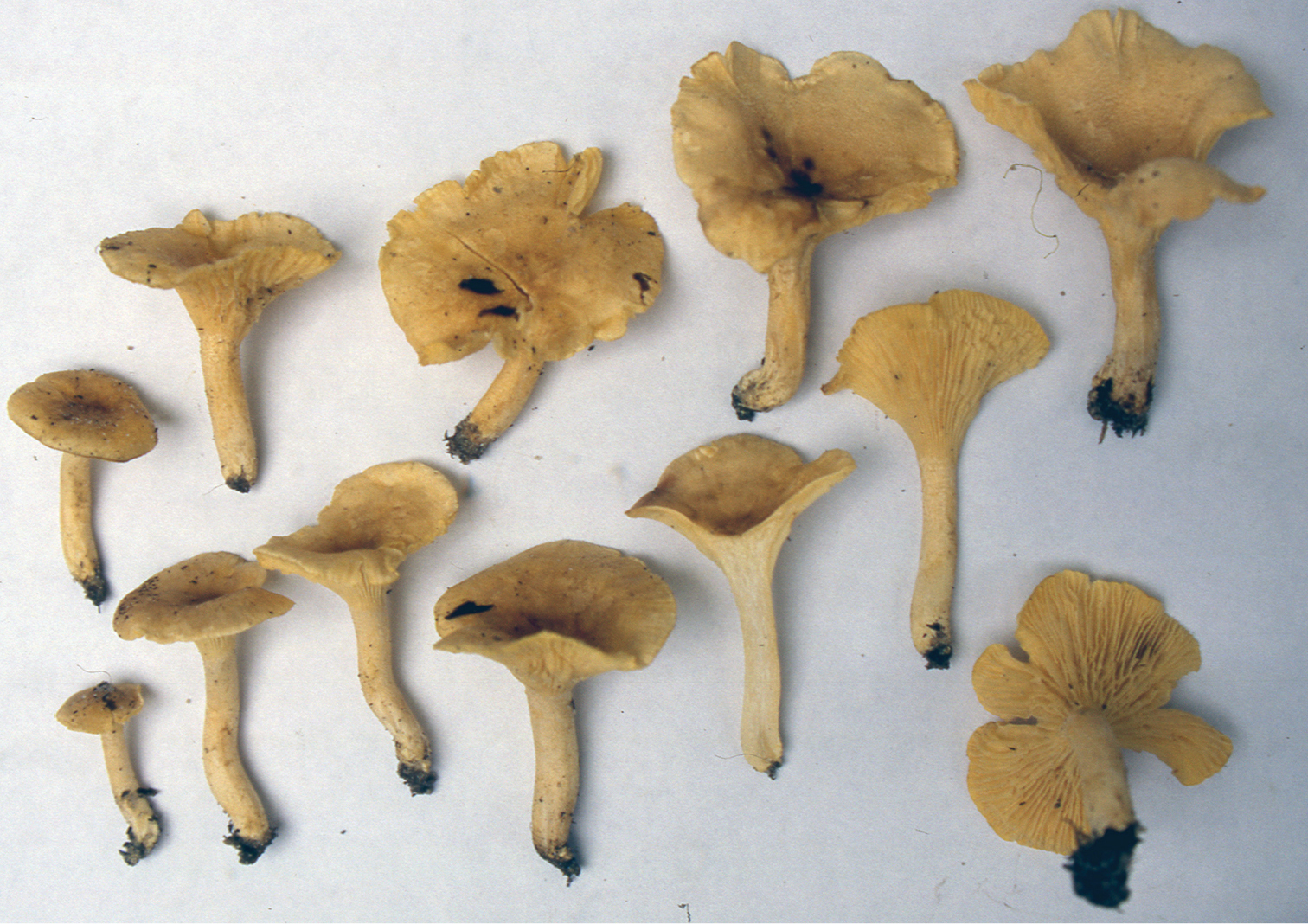
- Cantharellus densilamellatus

Scientific classification
- Kingdom: Fungi
- Division: Basidiomycota
- Class: Agaricomycetes
- Order: Cantharellales
- Family: Cantharellaceae
- Genus: Cantharellus
- Subgenus: Cantharellus subg. Rubrini; Eyssart. & Buyck 2013

Species
- See text

= Cantharellus subg. Rubrini =

Subgenus of fungi

Cantharellus subg. Rubrini
- Mycological characteristics
- Gills on hymenium
- Cap is convex
- Edibility is edible

Rubrini is a subgenus of fungi in the genus Cantharellus with species found in Africa and Madagascar.

== Description ==
Fruiting bodies are fleshy, variable in size hymenophore very variable from smooth to gilled and forked. Clamp connections are absent on hyphal endings.

== Taxonomy ==
The subgenus was established in 2013 based on phylogenetic analysis

=== Species ===
Accepted species:

Image	Scientific name	Year	Mycorrhizal association	Distribution
	C. albidolutescens Buyck, Eyssart. & V. Hofst.	2014		Madagascar
	C. albidosquamosus Buyck, T.W. Henkel & V. Hofst.	2020	Uapaca acuminata	Cameroon
	C. alboroseus Heinem.	2014		Congo
	C. ambohitantelyensis Buyck & V. Hofst.	2014		Madagascar
	C. brunneopallidus Buyck, Randrianj. & V. Hofst.	2019		Madagascar
	C. cibarioides (Heinem.) Buyck	2014	Gilbertiodendron dewevrei	Congo
	C. densifolius Heinem.	1958	Gilbertiodendron dewevrei	Democratic Republic of Congo and southern Central African Republic, Tanzania
	C. densilamellatus Buyck & V. Hofst.	2019		Tanzania
	C. eucalyptorum Buyck, Randrianj. & V. Hofst.	2015		Madagascar
	C. gracilis Buyck & V. Hofst.	2012		Tanzania
	C. griseotinctus Buyck, Randrianj. & V. Hofst.	2019		Madagascar
	C. heinemannianus Eyssart. & Buyck	1998		Zambia
	C. humidicolus Buyck & V. Hofst.	2012		Tanzania
	C. ibityensis Buyck, Randrianj. & V. Hofst.	2014		Madagascar
	C. isabellinus Heinem.	1958		Tanzania
	C. luteopunctatus (Beeli) Heinem.	1958	Gilbertiodendron dewevrei	Congo, Cameroon
	C. minutissimus Buyck & V. Hofst.	2016		Cameroon
	C. miomboensis Buyck & V. Hofst.	2012		Tanzania
	C. parvisporus (Eyssart. & Buyck) Buyck & V. Hofst.	2018		Tanzania
	C. paucifurcatus Buyck, Randrianj. & V. Hofst.	2015		Madagascar
	C. ruber Heinem.	1966		Tanzania
	C. sebosus Buyck, Randrianj. & V. Hofst.	2014		Madagascar
	C. subfloridulus Buyck & V. Hofstett.	2018	Gilbertiodendron dewevrei	Central African Republic
	C. sublaevis Buyck & Eyssart.	2014		Congo
	C. tanzanicus Buyck & V. Hofst.	2012		Madagascar
	C. tomentosoides Buyck & V. Hofst.	2019		Central African Republic
	C. tomentosus Eyssart. & Buyck	2020		Tanzania
	C. tricolor Buyck, Randrianj. & V. Hofst.	2015		Madagascar
