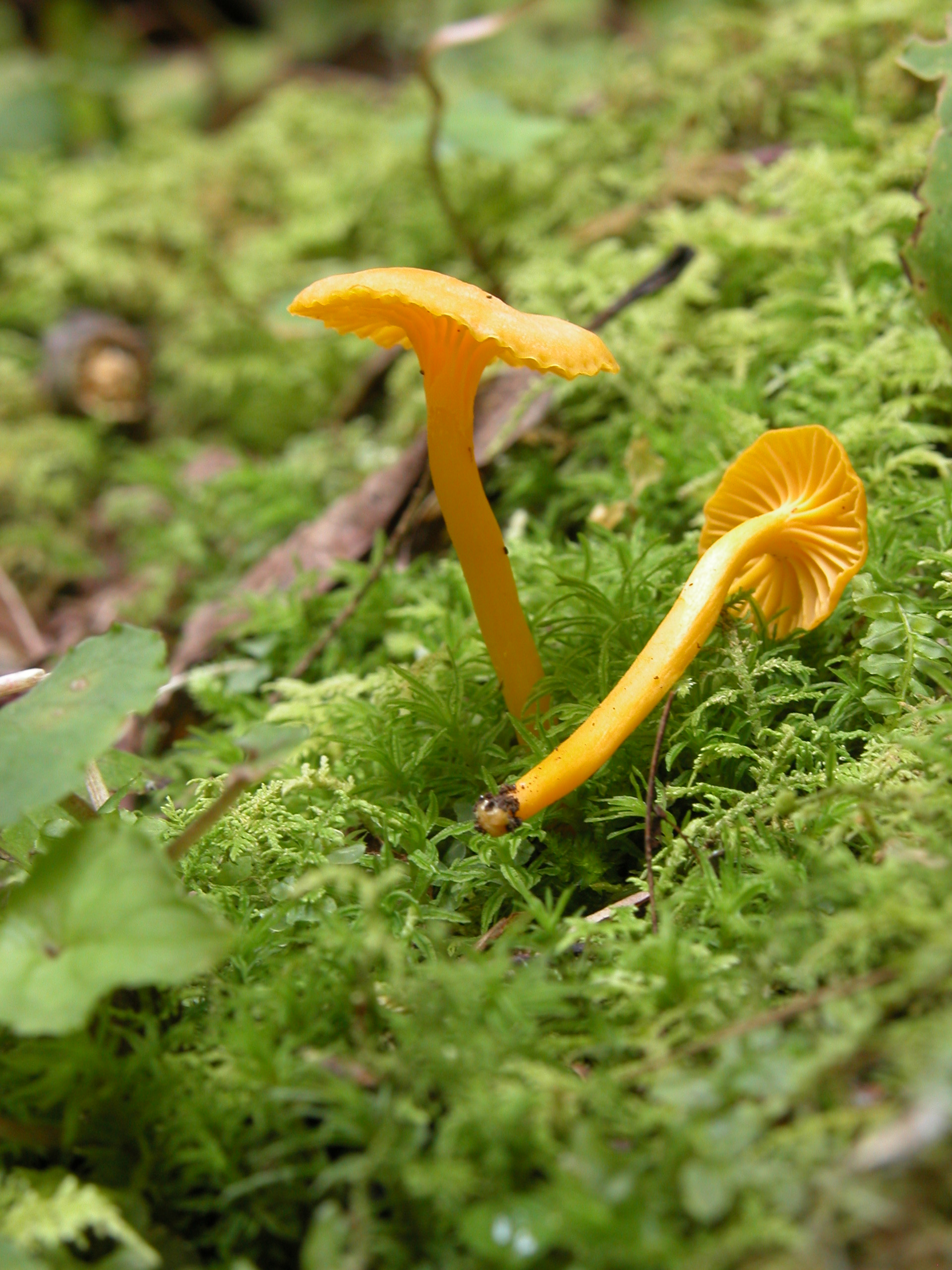

Scientific classification
- Domain: Eukaryota
- Kingdom: Fungi
- Division: Basidiomycota
- Class: Agaricomycetes
- Order: Cantharellales
- Family: Cantharellaceae
- Genus: Cantharellus
- Species: C. minor

Binomial name
- Cantharellus minor Peck (1872)

Synonyms
- Merulius minor (Peck) Kuntze (1891)

= Cantharellus minor =

Species of fungus

Cantharellus minor Mycological characteristics
- Ridges on hymenium
- Cap is convex
- Hymenium is decurrent
- Stipe is bare
- Spore print is yellow
- Ecology is mycorrhizal
- Edibility is edible

Cantharellus minor is a fungus native to eastern North America. It is one of the smallest of the genus Cantharellus, which includes other edible chanterelles.

== Description ==
Cantharellus minor is colored bright yellow to yellowish-orange. The cap ranges from 0.5 to 3 centimetres (1/4 to 1 1/4 in) wide and is convex and umbonate, often shallowly depressed, becoming funnel-shaped in some. The yellowish gills are decurrent, fade to yellowish white in maturity, and may seem large in proportion to the small fruiting body. The stipe is 2–5 cm (3/4–2 in) tall and 3–6 millimetres (1/8–1/4 in) thick.

=== Similar species ===
Lookalikes include the Gulf Coast's C. tabernensis which has a darker center, Craterellus ignicolor which has shallower ridges and usually a depression in the cap, and Gloioxanthomyces nitidus which has a very circular margin, fairly straight stem and non-forking gills.

== Distribution and habitat ==
Native to eastern North America, the fungi fruits from June to September.

It is suspected of being mycorrhizal, found in association with oaks and moss. Recently, C. minor has been reported from semi-evergreen to evergreen forests in the Western Ghats, Kerala, India forming ectomycorrhizal associations with tree species like Vateria indica, Diospyros malabarica, Hopea parviflora, and Myristica species.

== Uses ==
Although insubstantial, the mushrooms are edible.
