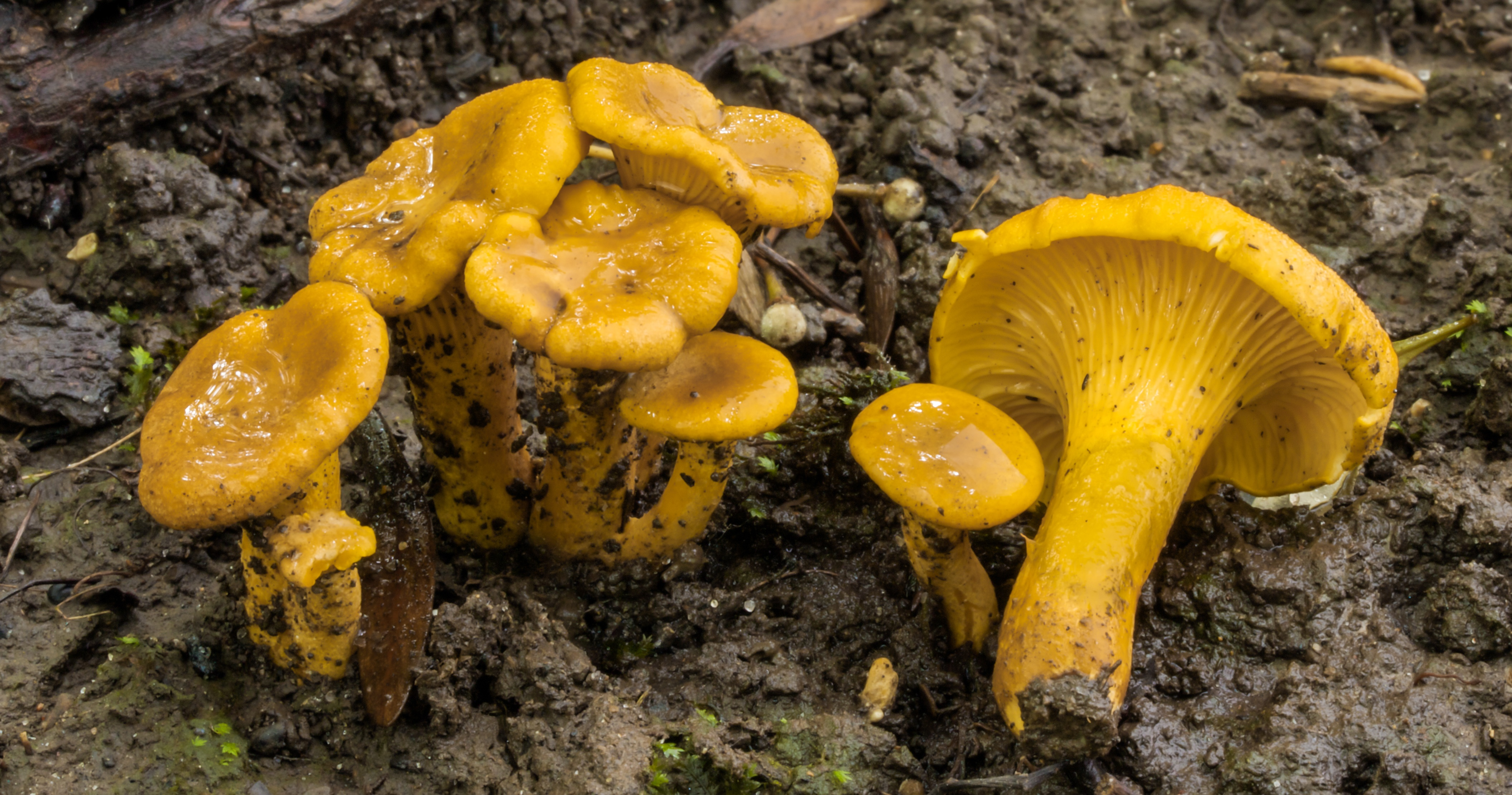

Scientific classification
- Domain: Eukaryota
- Kingdom: Fungi
- Division: Basidiomycota
- Class: Agaricomycetes
- Order: Cantharellales
- Family: Cantharellaceae
- Genus: Cantharellus
- Species: C. chicagoensis

Binomial name
- Cantharellus chicagoensis Leacock, J. Riddell, Rui Zhang & G.M. Muell 2016

= Cantharellus chicagoensis =

Species of fungus

Cantharellus chicagoensis, the Chicago chanterelle, is a species of Cantharellus from United States.
