= Cantharellus subg. Magni =

Scientific classification
- Kingdom: Fungi
- Division: Basidiomycota
- Class: Agaricomycetes
- Order: Cantharellales
- Family: Cantharellaceae
- Genus: Cantharellus
- Subgenus: Cantharellus subg. Magni; T. Cao & H.S. Yuan 2021

Type species
- Cantharellus magnus T. Cao & H. S. Yuan

Species
- See Text

Subgenus of fungi

Cantharellus subg. Magni
- Mycological characteristics
- Gills on hymenium
- Cap is convex
- Edibility is edible

Magni is a subgenus of fungi in the genus Cantharellus. Species in this genus is found in China.

== Taxonomy ==
The subgenus was established in 2021 with Cantharellus magnus as the type species, which the subgenus is named after. Two other species C. laevigatus and C. bellus were described in 2023.

=== Species ===
Accepted species:

Image	Scientific name	Year	Mycorrhizal association	Distribution
	C. bellus N.K. Zeng, Y.Z. Zhang, Z.H. Chen & W.F. Lin	2023	Castanopsis kawakamii	China(Hainan)
	C. laevigatus N.K. Zeng, Y.Z. Zhang, Z.H. Chen & W.F. Lin	2023		China(Hunan, Zhejiang)
	C. magnus T. Cao & H. S. Yuan	2021		China(Hunan)
