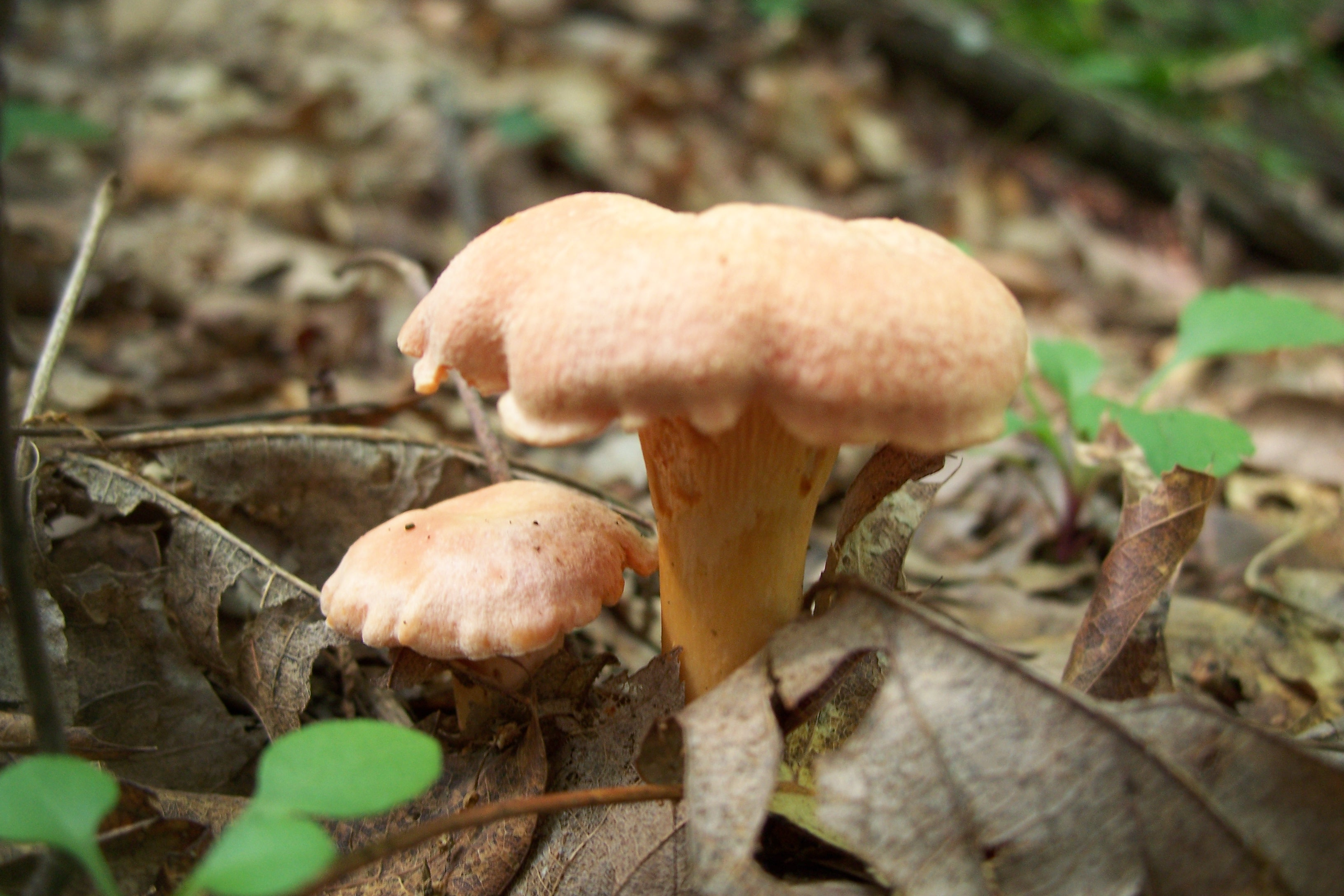

Scientific classification
- Kingdom: Fungi
- Division: Basidiomycota
- Class: Agaricomycetes
- Order: Cantharellales
- Family: Cantharellaceae
- Genus: Cantharellus
- Species: C. persicinus

Binomial name
- Cantharellus persicinus R.H. Petersen 1986

= Cantharellus persicinus =

Species of fungus

Cantharellus persicinus
- Mycological characteristics
- Ridges on hymenium
- Cap is infundibuliform
- Hymenium is decurrent
- Stipe is bare
- Spore print is white to pink
- Ecology is mycorrhizal
- Edibility is choice

Cantharellus persicinus, the peach or pink chanterelle, is a fungus native to the Appalachian region of eastern North America. Like other popular edible chanterelles, it is a member of the genus Cantharellus. It is suspected of being mycorrhizal, found in association with oaks and eastern hemlock.

DNA analysis has shown C. persicinus to be a genetically valid species.
