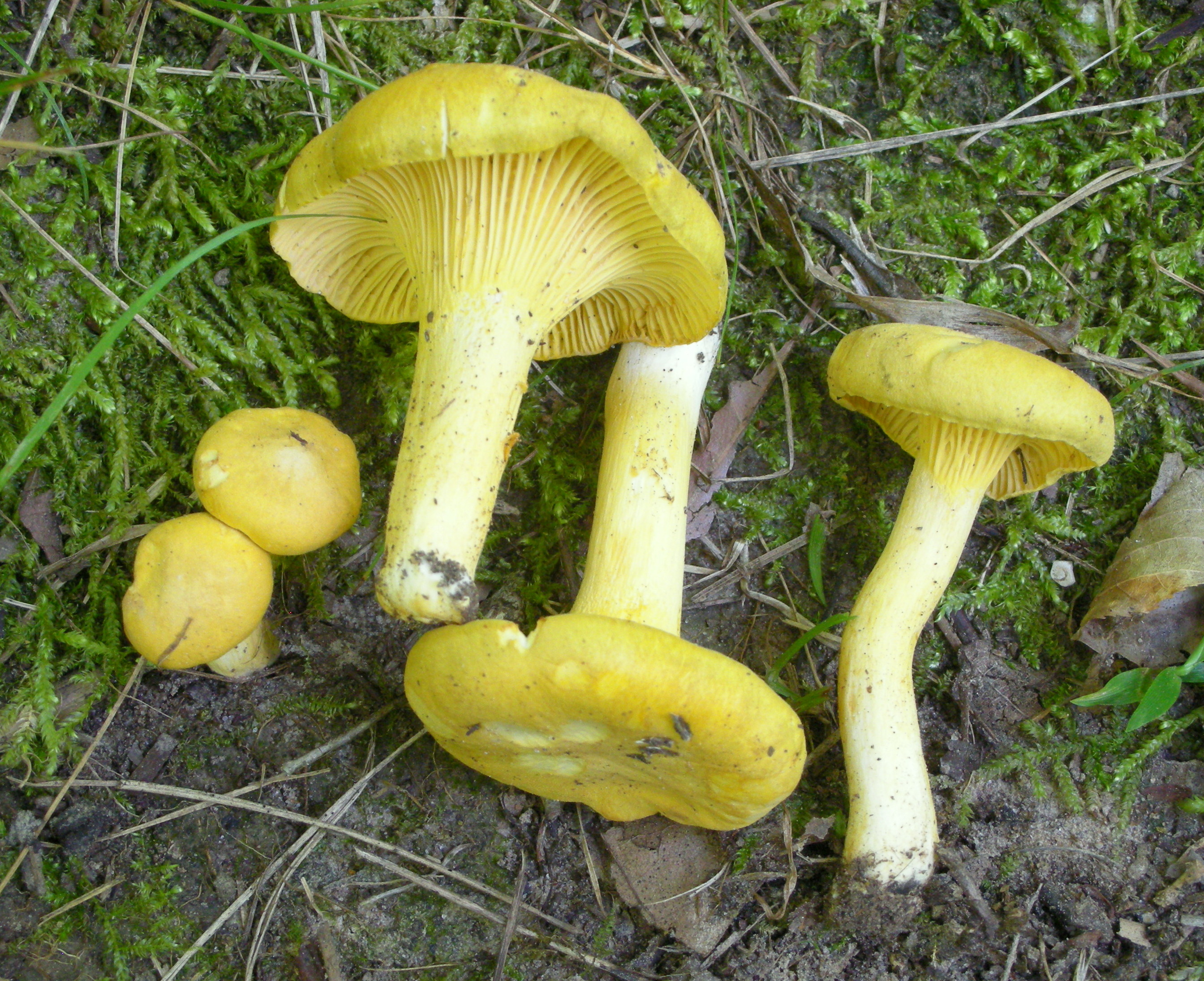

Scientific classification
- Domain: Eukaryota
- Kingdom: Fungi
- Division: Basidiomycota
- Class: Agaricomycetes
- Order: Cantharellales
- Family: Cantharellaceae
- Genus: Cantharellus
- Species: C. altipes

Binomial name
- Cantharellus altipes Buyck & V.Hofst. (2011)

= Cantharellus altipes =

Species of fungus

Cantharellus altipes is a species of fungus in the family Cantharellaceae. Described as new to science in 2011, it is found in Texas, where it grows in oak-pine woods.
