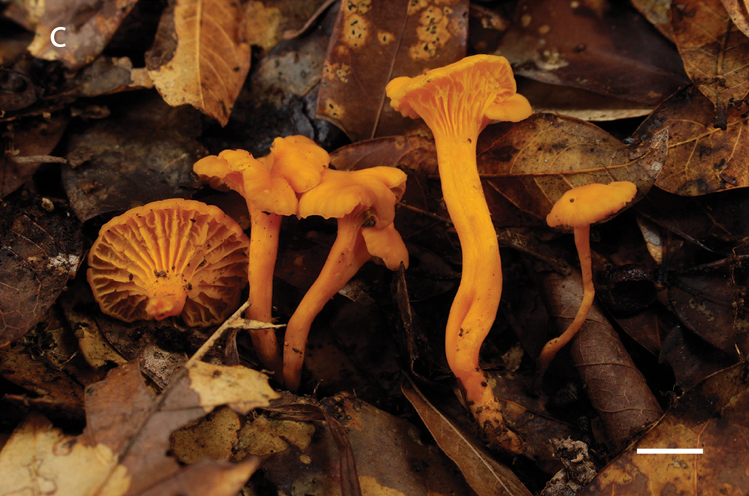

Scientific classification
- Domain: Eukaryota
- Kingdom: Fungi
- Division: Basidiomycota
- Class: Agaricomycetes
- Order: Cantharellales
- Family: Cantharellaceae
- Genus: Cantharellus
- Species: C. parvoflavus

Binomial name
- Cantharellus parvoflavus Bandala, Montoya & M. Herrera

= Cantharellus parvoflavus =

Species of fungus

Cantharellus parvoflavus is a species of Cantharellus found in Mexico.

== Distribution ==
This species is found in the Oak forest of eastern Mexico in the state of Veracruz growing in association with Quercus oleoides.
