= Cantharellus subg. Pseudocantharellus =

Scientific classification
- Kingdom: Fungi
- Division: Basidiomycota
- Class: Agaricomycetes
- Order: Cantharellales
- Family: Cantharellaceae
- Genus: Cantharellus
- Subgenus: Cantharellus subg. Pseudocantharellus; Eyssart. & Buyck

Type species
- Cantharellus rubrosalmoneus (Buyck & V. Hofst.) Buyck & V. Hofst.

Species
- See Text

Subgenus of fungi

Cantharellus subg. Pseudocantharellus
- Mycological characteristics
- Gills on hymenium
- Cap is convex
- Edibility is edible

Pseudocantharellus is a subgenus of fungi in the genus Cantharellus. Species in this subgenus are found in Africa.

== Description ==
The fruiting bodies of this species are pink to red with thin-walled hyphal endings.

== Taxonomy ==
The subgenus was established in 2013 based on phylogenetic analysis.

=== Species ===
Accepted species:

Image	Scientific name	Year	Mycorrhizal association	Distribution
	C. floridulus Heinem.	1958		sub-Saharan Africa
	C. goossensiae (Beeli) Heinem.	1958		Congo
	C. miniatescens Heinem.	1958		Congo
	C. violaceoflavescens De Kesel, Guelly, L.A.Parra & Buyck	2020	Berlinia grandiflora	Togo
	C. rhodophyllus Heinem	1958	Gilbertiodendron dewevrei	Congo
	C. rubrosalmoneus (Buyck & V. Hofst.) Buyck & V. Hofst.	2018		Madagascar
