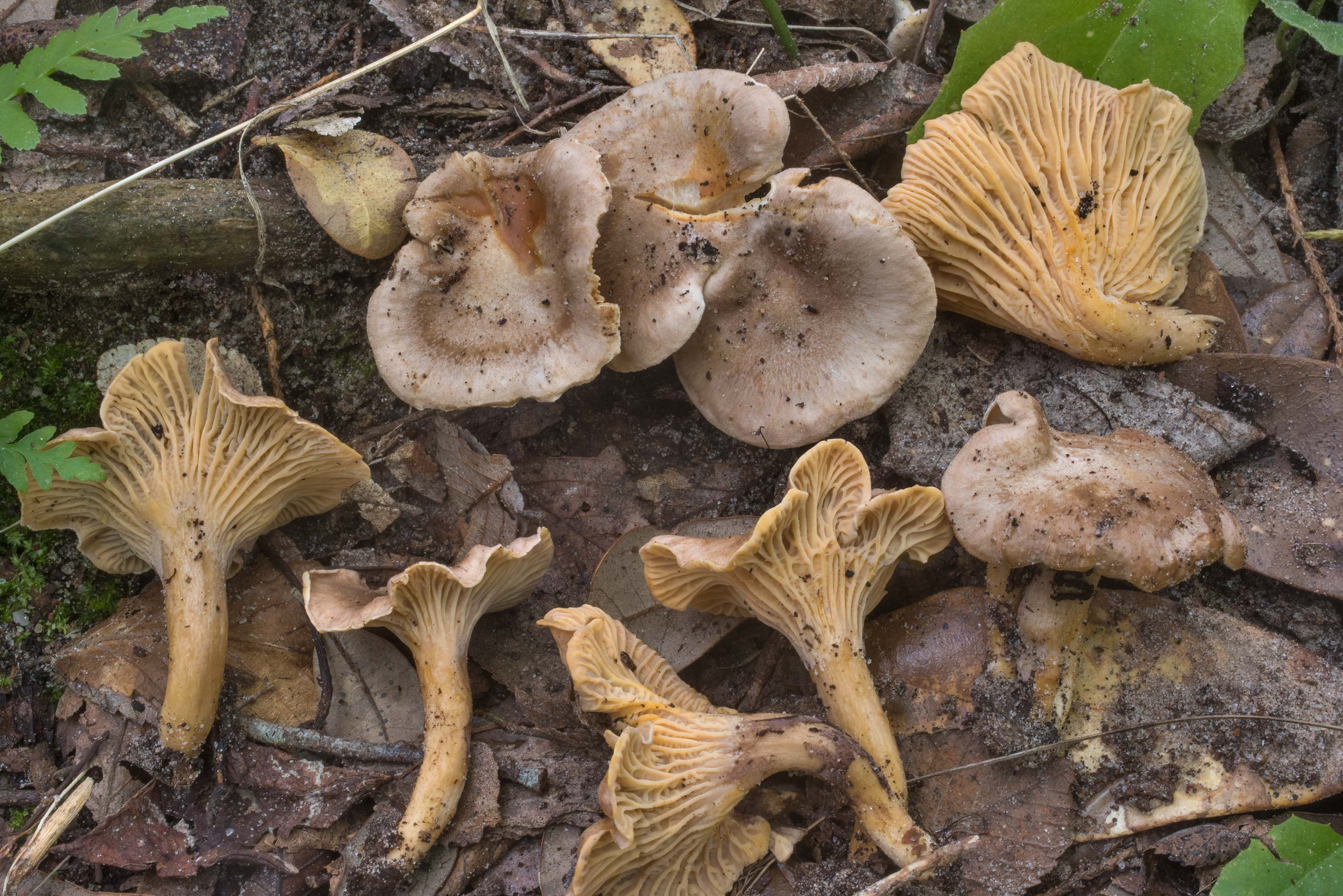

Scientific classification
- Kingdom: Fungi
- Division: Basidiomycota
- Class: Agaricomycetes
- Order: Cantharellales
- Family: Cantharellaceae
- Genus: Cantharellus
- Species: C. quercophilus

Binomial name
- Cantharellus quercophilus Buyck, D.P. Lewis, Eyssart. & V. Hofstetter 2010

= Cantharellus quercophilus =

Species of fungus

Cantharellus quercophilus is a species of Cantharellus found in the western Gulf Coast region of the United States from Texas to Florida. The mushrooms are found growing in savanna habitats with Post Oak (Quercus stellata) and other Quercus.
