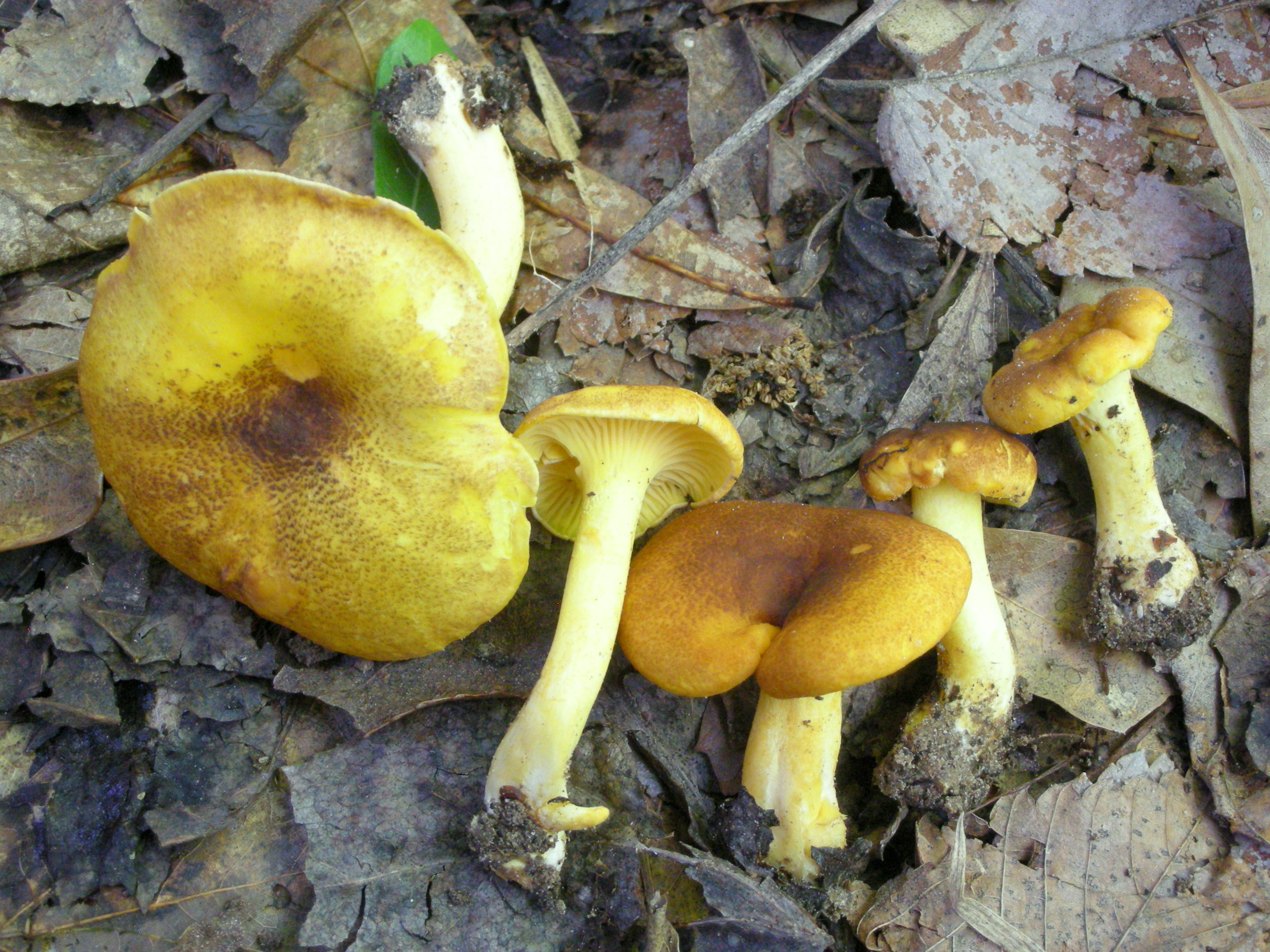

Scientific classification
- Domain: Eukaryota
- Kingdom: Fungi
- Division: Basidiomycota
- Class: Agaricomycetes
- Order: Cantharellales
- Family: Cantharellaceae
- Genus: Cantharellus
- Species: C. lewisii

Binomial name
- Cantharellus lewisii Buyck & V.Hofst. (2011)

= Cantharellus lewisii =

Species of fungus

Cantharellus lewisii is a species of fungus in the family Cantharellaceae.

Discovered in 2011, it is found in the Southeastern United States where it associates with floodplain hardwoods. Its name honours American mycologist David Lewis.
