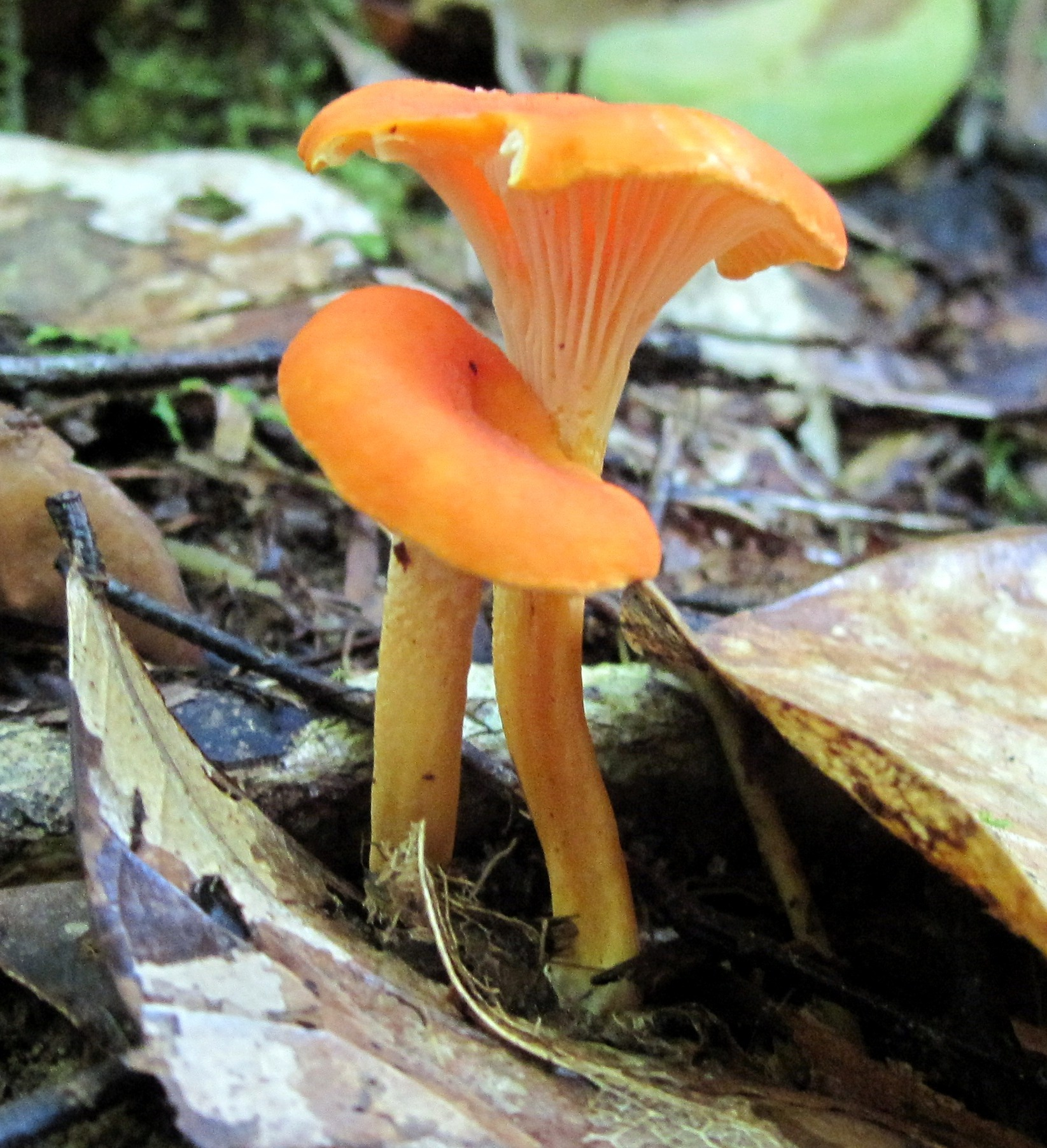

Scientific classification
- Domain: Eukaryota
- Kingdom: Fungi
- Division: Basidiomycota
- Class: Agaricomycetes
- Order: Cantharellales
- Family: Cantharellaceae
- Genus: Cantharellus
- Species: C. guyanensis

Binomial name
- Cantharellus guyanensis Mont. 1854

Synonyms
- Merulius guyanensis (Mont.) Kuntze (1891)

= Cantharellus guyanensis =

Species of fungus

Cantharellus guyanensis is a tropical South American species of mushroom-forming fungus in the chanterelle genus (Cantharellus), first described by Camille Montagne from French Guiana in 1854.

It has since also been found in Guyana, Suriname, Venezuela, and Brazil. The fruit bodies have a bright orange cap colour and occur in medium- to large-sized troops. C. guyanensis seems to prefer sand-rich soil and forms ectomycorrhiza with a putatively wide range of host trees and shrubs including Coccoloba, Guapira, and Neea. Its congeners Cantharellus aurantioconspicuus, C. amazonensis, and C. protectus, all described from Brazil, are similar species.

Although edible, C. guyanensis seems to be shunned by the Patamona people of Guyana who however use several other mushroom species occurring in their land. Known as "chanterelle de Guyane" in French, the species is presumably eaten in French Guiana.
