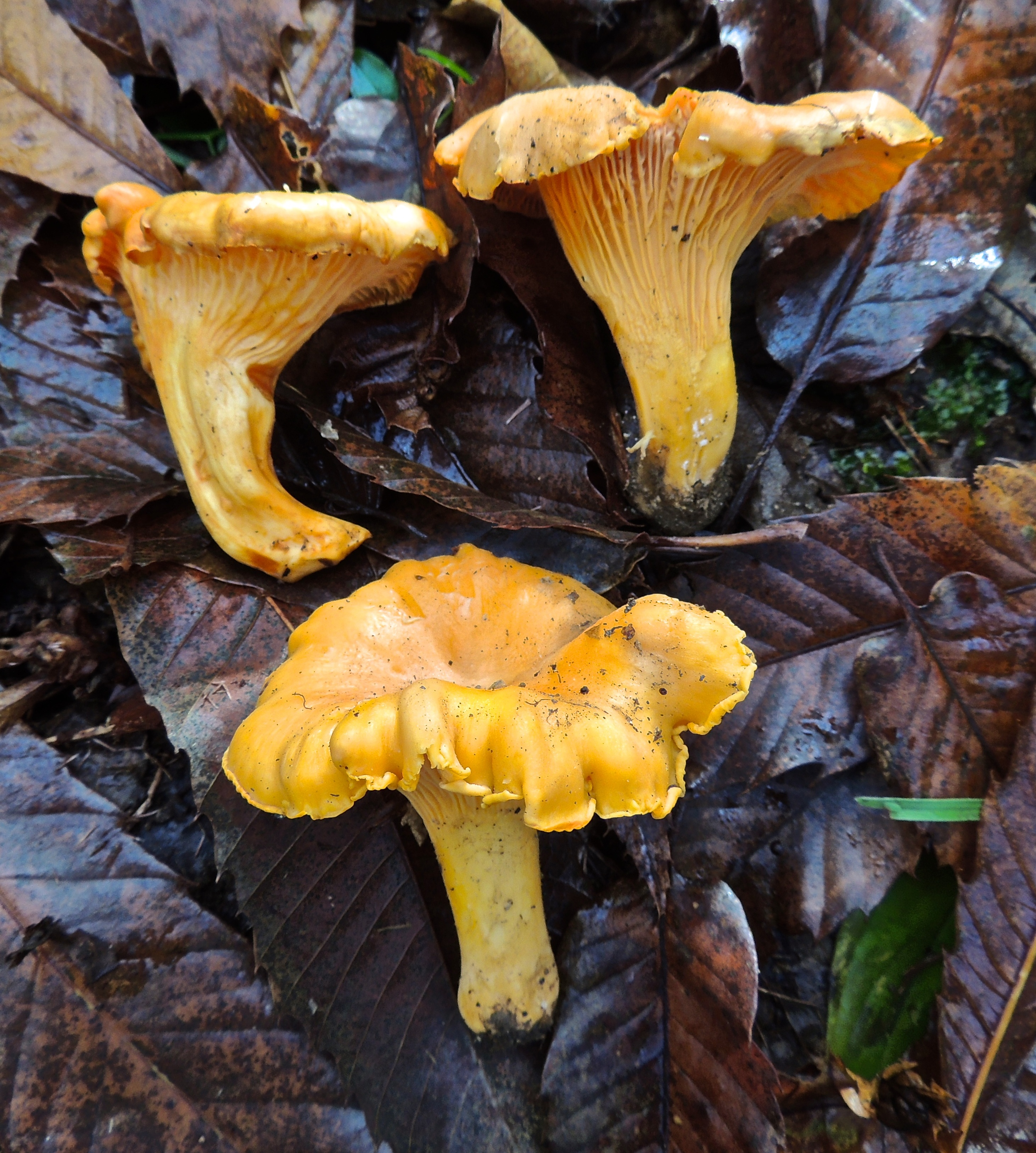

Scientific classification
- Domain: Eukaryota
- Kingdom: Fungi
- Division: Basidiomycota
- Class: Agaricomycetes
- Order: Cantharellales
- Family: Cantharellaceae
- Genus: Cantharellus
- Species: C. subpruinosus

Binomial name
- Cantharellus subpruinosus Eyssart. & Buyck (2000)

= Cantharellus subpruinosus =

Species of mushroom-forming fungus

Cantharellus subpruinosus Mycological characteristics
- Ridges on hymenium
- Cap is infundibuliform
- Hymenium is decurrent
- Stipe is bare
- Spore print is buff
- Ecology is mycorrhizal
- Edibility is edible

Cantharellus subpruinosus is a species of edible mushroom-forming fungus in the family Cantharellaceae. A European species, it was originally described from France in 2000, where it was found growing in moss in mixed deciduous and spruce woodland.

== Description ==
The cap of Cantharellus subpruinosus ranges from 20 to 70 mm in diameter. Initially convex, it flattens out with age and may become slightly depressed at the centre. The surface of the cap is smooth and has a silky to velvety texture, initially covered by a distinctive white powdery coating known as pruina, which makes young specimens appear almost white. As the fungus matures, the cap transitions to a vibrant orange hue, often becoming marked with ochre stains when bruised or handled. Its edge is distinctly wavy to lobed and retains remnants of the pruina even at maturity, gradually turning a rust-like shade.

The underside features pronounced, decurrent folds (ridges that run down the stipe), which share the same general colouration as the cap and similarly stain yellow to orangey-ochre when touched. The stipe measures 20 to 70 mm tall and 10 to 30 mm thick, sometimes broadening slightly towards the top. Initially solid, the stipe gradually develops a hollow area towards its base, and its shape can vary from somewhat spindle-like to cylindrical-clavate (club-shaped). Typically, the stipe is slightly paler than or the same colour as the cap and likewise stains ochre upon handling.

Internally, the flesh of the stem is whitish, contrasting with the orange flesh beneath the cap's outer layer. The fungus has a mild taste and emits a pleasant, fruity aroma reminiscent of apricots. Microscopically, the spores of C. subpruinosus are elliptical, occasionally kidney-shaped when viewed from the side, smooth, and transparent (hyaline), measuring roughly 7.5–8.5 by 4–5 μm. The basidia—the spore-producing cells—are elongated and club-shaped, typically bearing five to six spores each.

== Taxonomy ==
Cantharellus subpruinosus was first described as a distinct species by Guillaume Eyssartier and Bart Buyck in 2001, based on specimens collected in the Haute-Savoie department of France. The species was recognised as new due to several unique morphological characteristics, particularly its distinctively paler, initially pruinose (powdery) cap and the vibrant ochre-orange colouration it acquires with age. Its epithet subpruinosus refers directly to the subtle white powdery coating (pruina) that partially covers its cap when young.

This species differs from closely related relatives, such as Cantharellus cibarius var. atlanticus, by its distinctly paler stalk, lighter gill folds, and the characteristic pale yellow to ochre-orange flesh. According to the author, these morphological distinctions justified its description as a separate species rather than a variety or form of a previously known chanterelle.

== Habitat and distribution ==
Cantharellus subpruinosus grows in mossy, forested habitats, typically within mixed woodlands dominated by broad-leaved trees and spruce (Picea species). It can be found growing singly or in clusters on the forest floor. At the time of its original description, its known geographical distribution was known to be centred in Europe, specifically described from the Haute-Savoie region in France. Its preferred habitat includes shaded, humid environments with abundant leaf litter, providing optimal conditions for its growth and development. A report of unusual fungal species found in Cyprus included a population of Cantharellus that were suggested to be C. subpruinosus.
