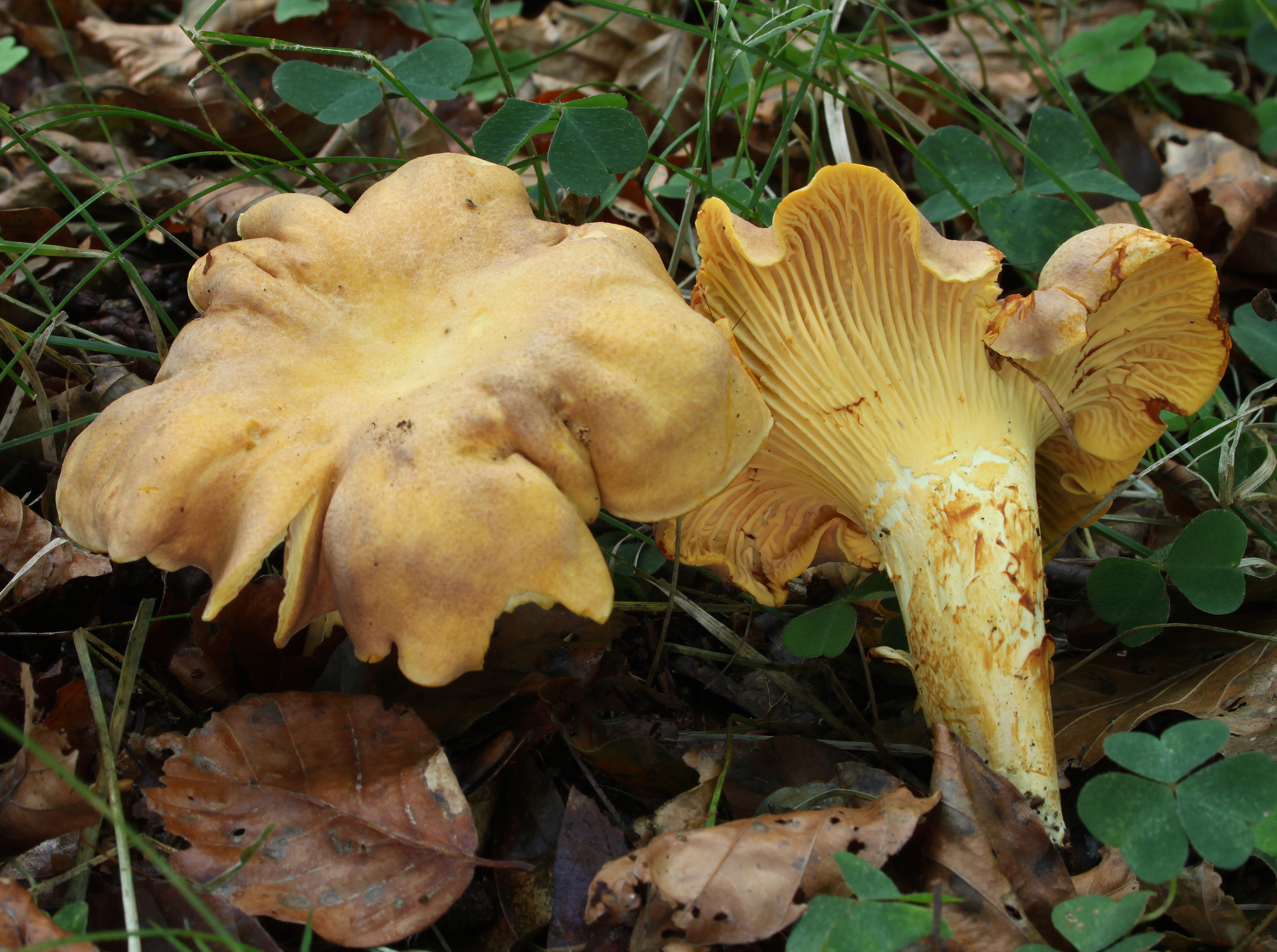

Scientific classification
- Kingdom: Fungi
- Division: Basidiomycota
- Class: Agaricomycetes
- Order: Cantharellales
- Family: Cantharellaceae
- Genus: Cantharellus
- Species: C. amethysteus

Binomial name
- Cantharellus amethysteus (Quél.) Sacc. 1887

= Cantharellus amethysteus =

Species of fungus

Cantharellus amethysteus
- Mycological characteristics
- Ridges on hymenium
- Cap is flat or depressed
- Hymenium is decurrent
- Stipe is bare
- Spore print is white to yellow
- Ecology is mycorrhizal
- Edibility is edible

Cantharellus amethysteus, the amethyst chanterelle, is a species of Cantharellus from Europe.

== Description ==
Cantharellus amethysteus is an edible chanterelle species with white flesh which turns yellow as it ages.

Cap: 5-10cm. Flat topped to start with depression forming. Downy texture with irregular, wavy edges. Stem: 3-4cm. Tapers downwards, often flattened or twisted. Veins/ridges: Thick and decurrent. Paler colour than the cap. Taste: Mild. Smell: Mild and pleasant, faint smell of apricots. Spore print: white to palish yellow sometimes with a pink tinge. Spores: Cylindrical to elongated ellipsoid, smooth, non-amyloid. 8-10 x 5.5-6 μm.
