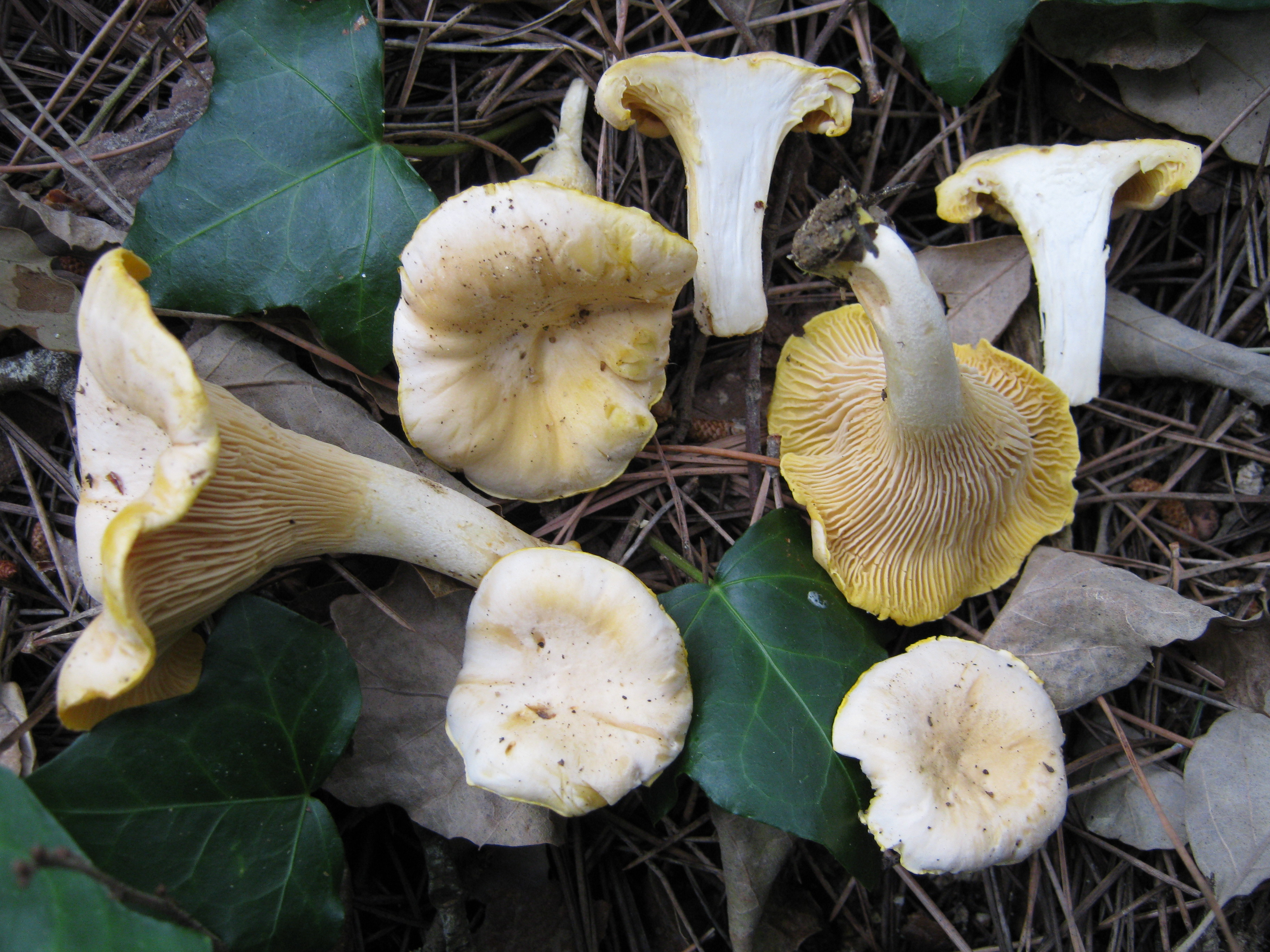

Scientific classification
- Domain: Eukaryota
- Kingdom: Fungi
- Division: Basidiomycota
- Class: Agaricomycetes
- Order: Cantharellales
- Family: Cantharellaceae
- Genus: Cantharellus
- Species: C. pallens

Binomial name
- Cantharellus pallens Pilát 1959

= Cantharellus pallens =

Species of fungus

Cantharellus pallens Mycological characteristics
- Gills on hymenium
- Cap is infundibuliform
- Hymenium is seceding
- Stipe is bare
- Spore print is cream
- Ecology is mycorrhizal
- Edibility is choice

Cantharellus pallens, the pale chanterelle, is a species of Cantharellus from Europe.
