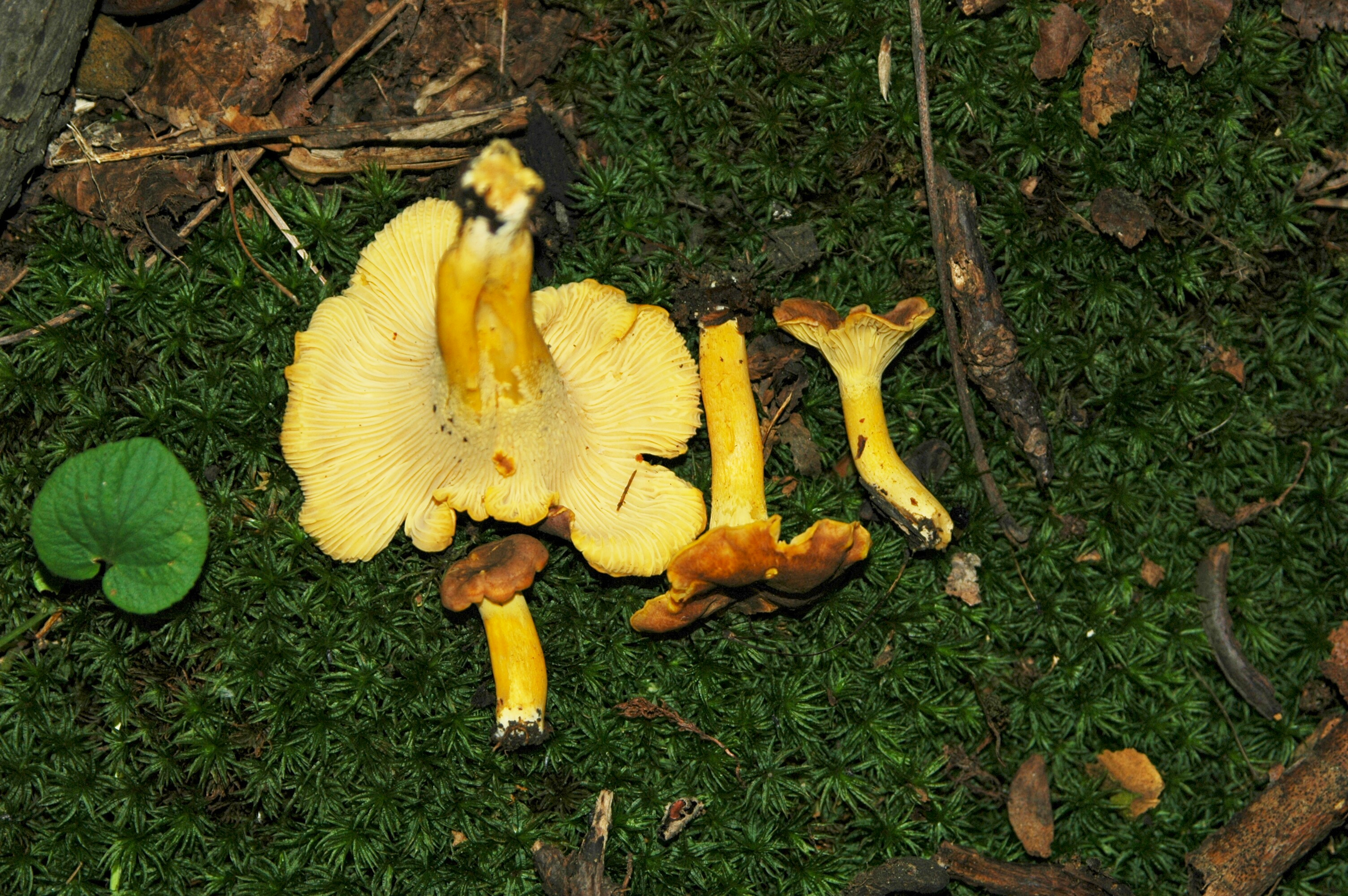

Scientific classification
- Domain: Eukaryota
- Kingdom: Fungi
- Division: Basidiomycota
- Class: Agaricomycetes
- Order: Cantharellales
- Family: Cantharellaceae
- Genus: Cantharellus
- Species: C. appalachiensis

Binomial name
- Cantharellus appalachiensis R.H. Petersen 1971

= Cantharellus appalachiensis =

Species of fungus

Cantharellus appalachiensis Mycological characteristics
- Ridges on hymenium
- Cap is infundibuliform
- Hymenium is decurrent
- Stipe is bare
- Spore print is buff
- Ecology is mycorrhizal
- Edibility is choice

Cantharellus appalachiensis is a fungus native to eastern North America in the genus Cantharellus, which includes other popular edible chanterelles. The cap color varies from brown to yellow, often with a brown spot on the cap at maturity. C. appalachiensis is mycorrhizal and is found in hardwood forests. The scientific name C. appalachiensis is after the Appalachian Mountains.
