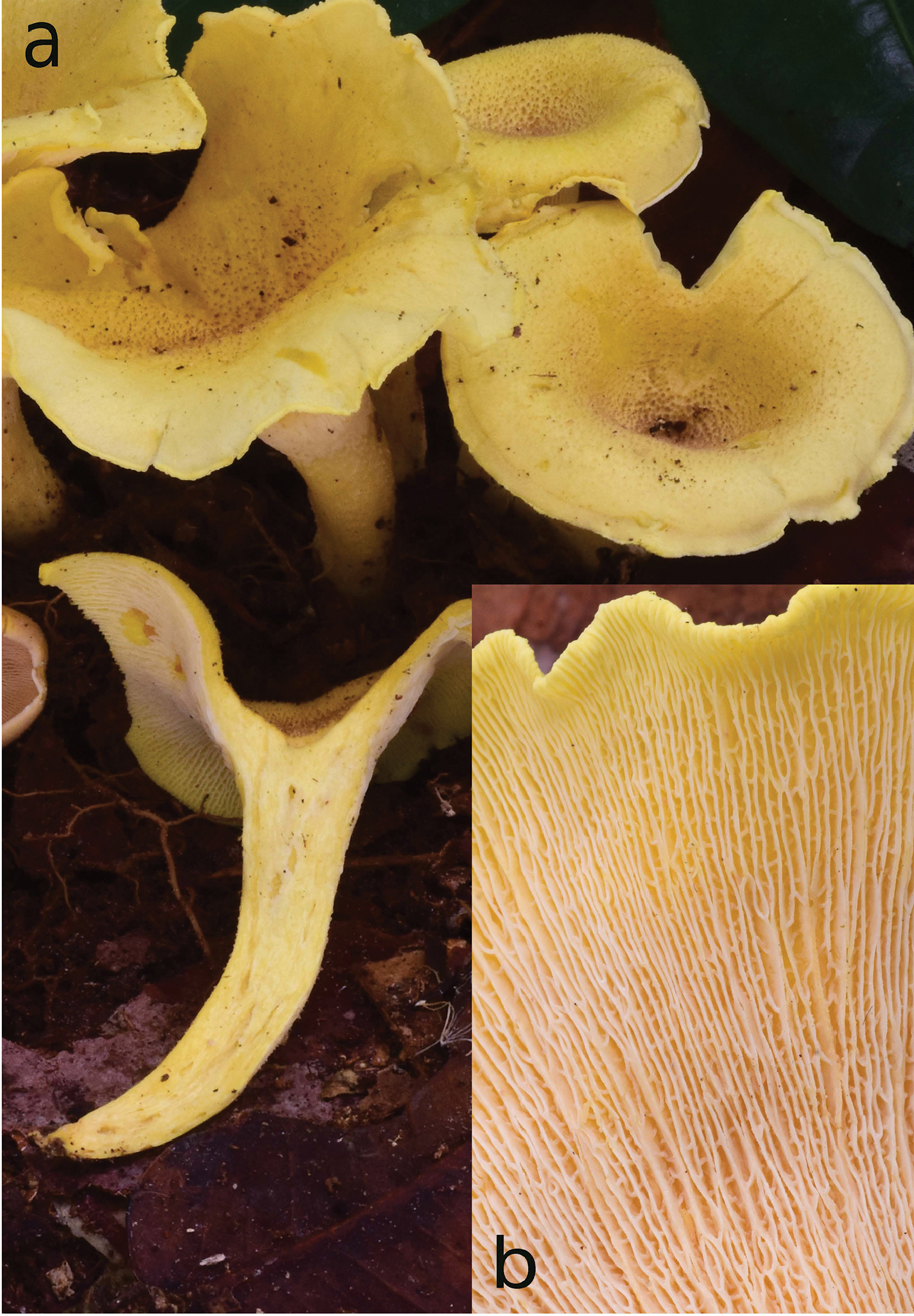

Scientific classification
- Domain: Eukaryota
- Kingdom: Fungi
- Division: Basidiomycota
- Class: Agaricomycetes
- Order: Cantharellales
- Family: Cantharellaceae
- Genus: Cantharellus
- Species: C. luteopunctatus

Binomial name
- Cantharellus luteopunctatus (Beeli) Heinem. (1958)

Synonyms
- Lentinus luteopunctatus Beeli (1928)

= Cantharellus luteopunctatus =

Species of fungus

Cantharellus luteopunctatus is a species of fungus in the genus Cantharellus. Found in Africa, it was described as new to science in 1928 by Belgian mycologist Maurice Beeli as Lentinus luteopunctatus. Paul Heinemann transferred it to Cantharellus in 1958.
