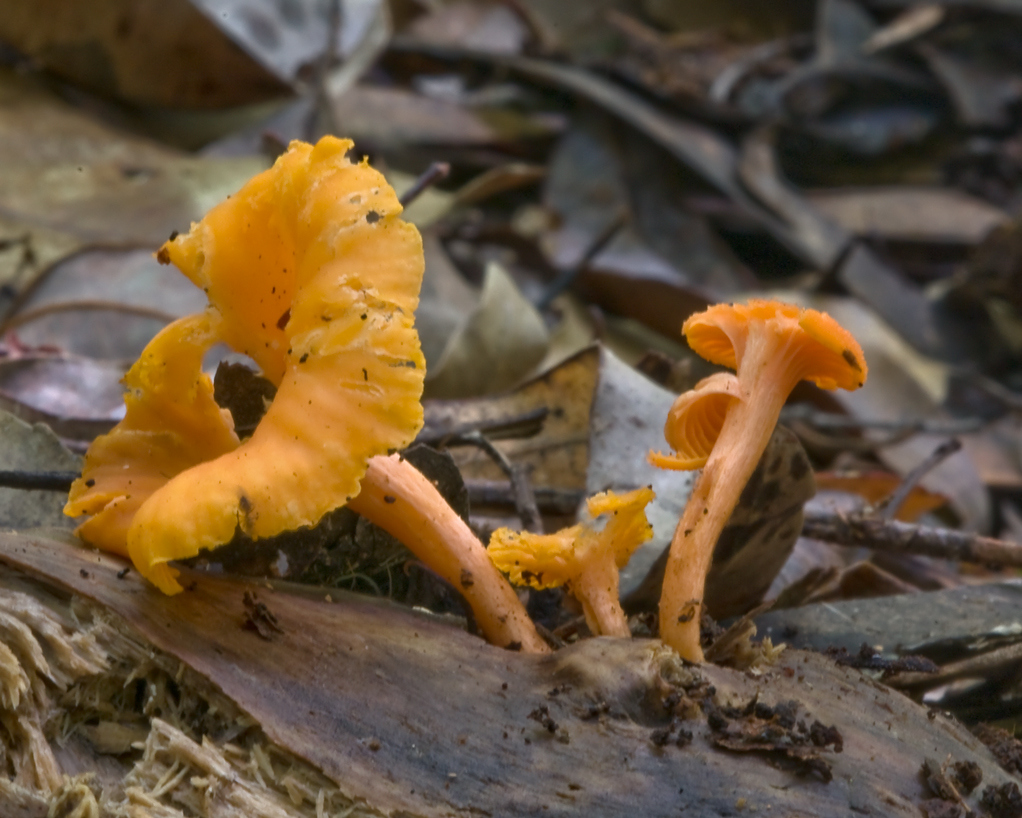

Scientific classification
- Domain: Eukaryota
- Kingdom: Fungi
- Division: Basidiomycota
- Class: Agaricomycetes
- Order: Cantharellales
- Family: Cantharellaceae
- Genus: Cantharellus
- Species: C. concinnus

Binomial name
- Cantharellus concinnus Berk. (1878)

Synonyms
- Merulius concinnus (Berk.) Kuntze (1891)

= Cantharellus concinnus =

Species of fungus

Cantharellus concinnus is a species of fungus in the genus Cantharellus. It is found in Australia, where it fruits in groups or clusters on the ground in mixed forests of Casuarina and Eucalyptus.
