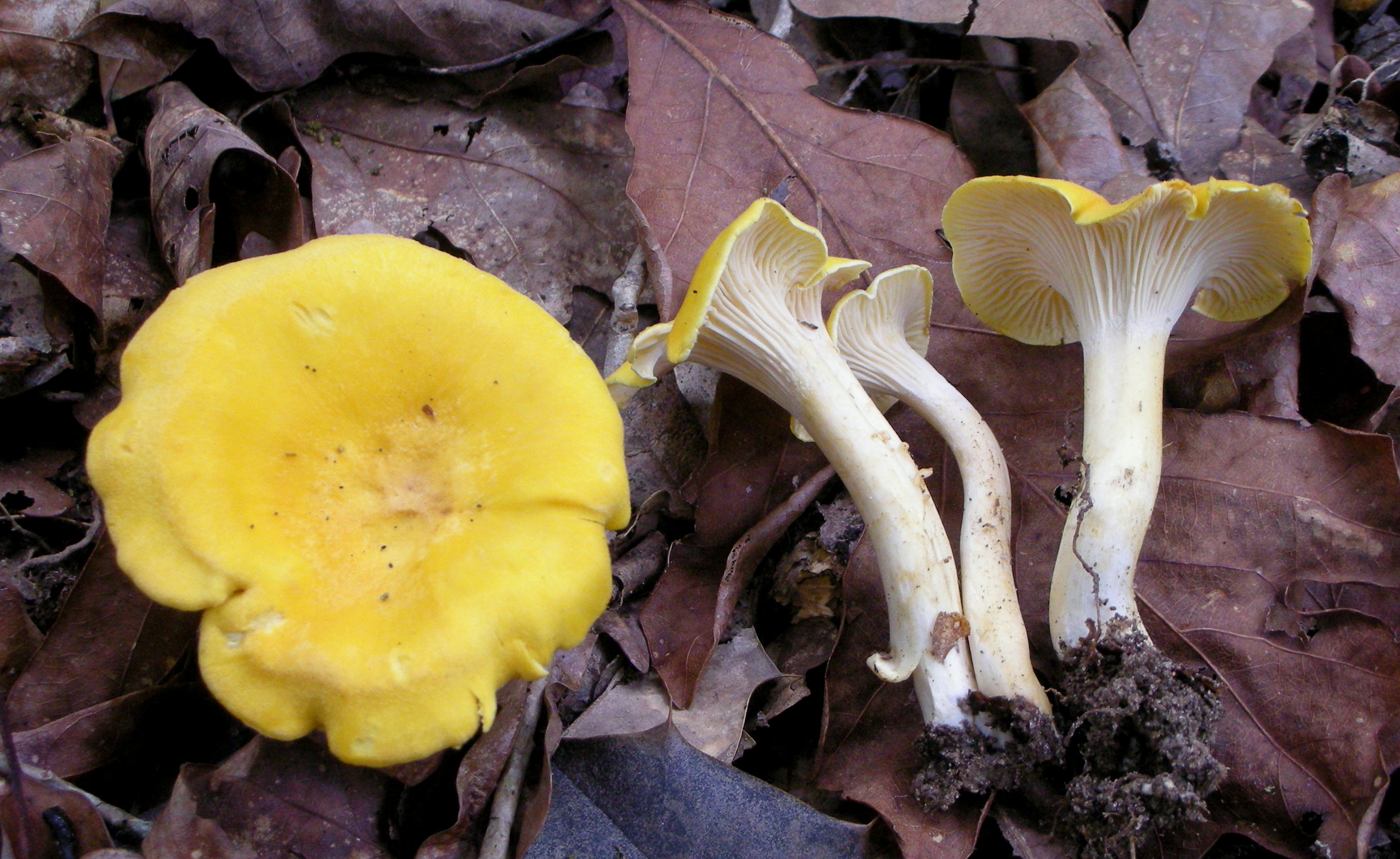

Scientific classification
- Kingdom: Fungi
- Division: Basidiomycota
- Class: Agaricomycetes
- Order: Cantharellales
- Family: Cantharellaceae
- Genus: Cantharellus
- Species: C. tenuithrix

Binomial name
- Cantharellus tenuithrix Buyck & V. Hofstetter, 2011

= Cantharellus tenuithrix =

Species of mushroom

Cantharellus tenuithrix is a species of Cantharellus found in hardwood forests from Texas to Tennessee and Florida
