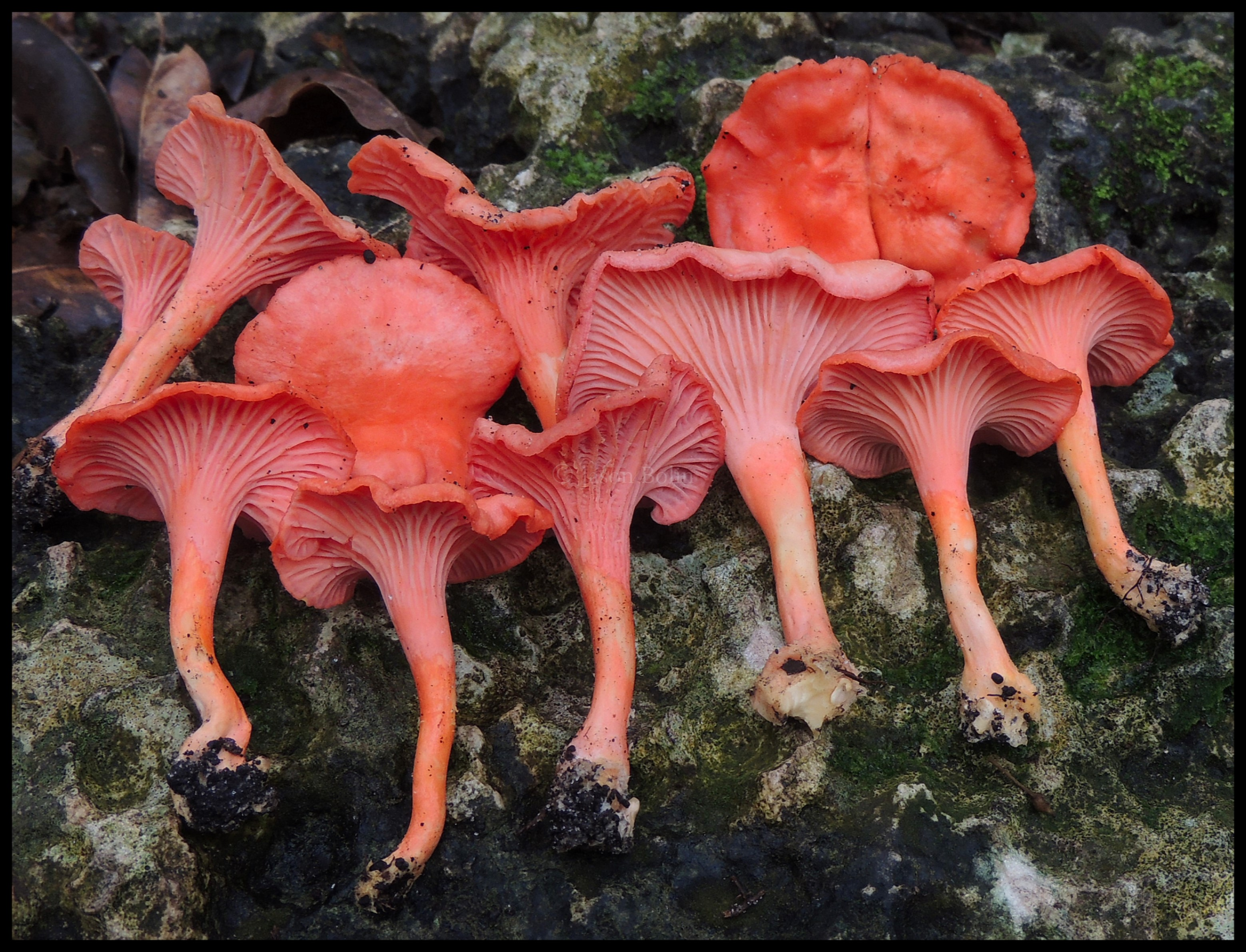

Scientific classification
- Kingdom: Fungi
- Division: Basidiomycota
- Class: Agaricomycetes
- Order: Cantharellales
- Family: Cantharellaceae
- Genus: Cantharellus
- Species: C. coccolobae

Binomial name
- Cantharellus coccolobae Buyck, P.A. Moreau & Courtec. 2016

= Cantharellus coccolobae =

Species of fungus

Cantharellus coccolobae is a species of Cantharellus (commonly referred to as chanterelles) that was formally described in 2016. C. coccolobae is ectomycorrhizal, forming a symbiotic relationship with Coccoloba uviferae (seagrape) and Coccoloba diversifolia (pigeonplum). It is present in the Caribbean, the Bahamas, Mexico, and Florida, United States.
