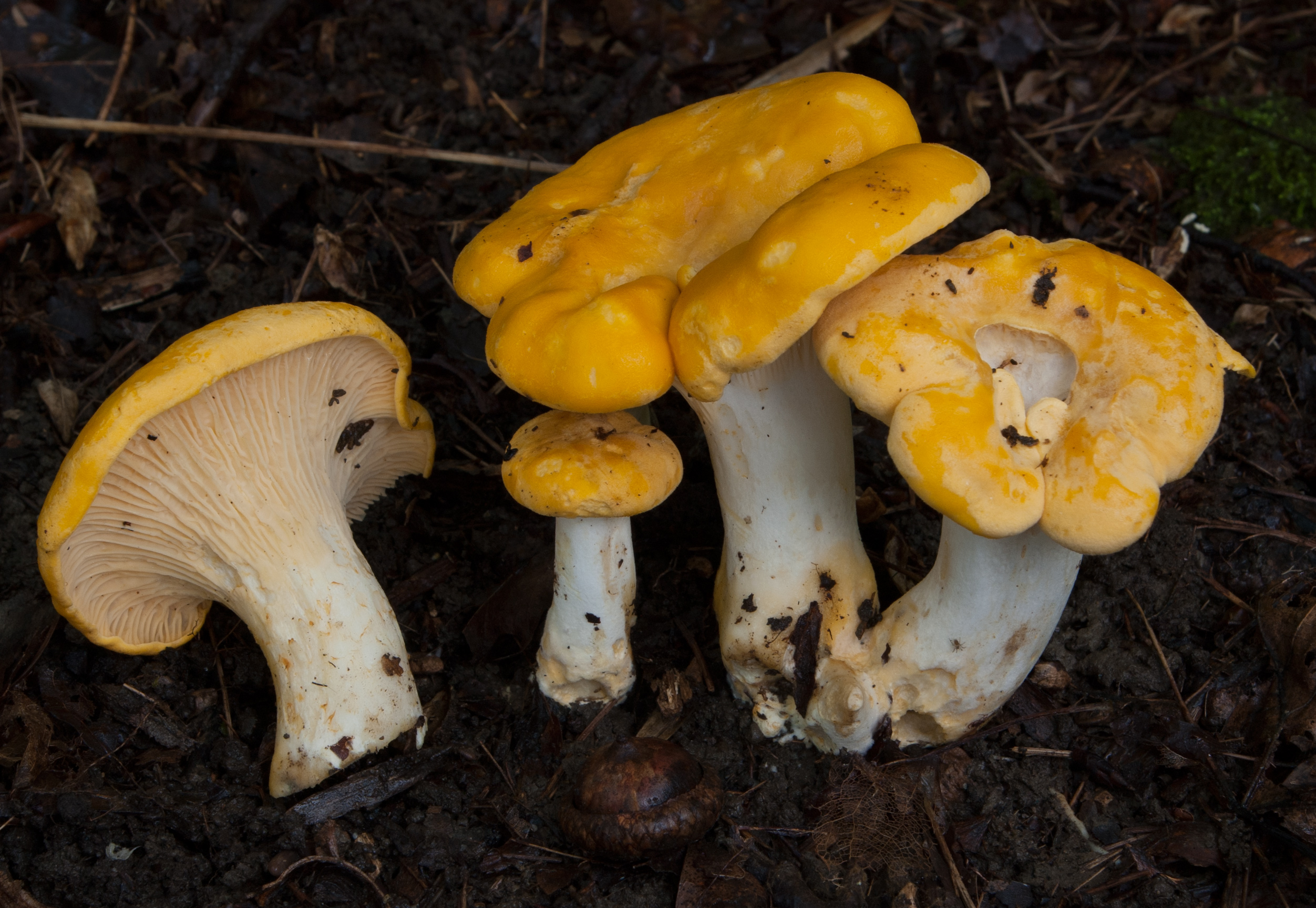

Scientific classification
- Domain: Eukaryota
- Kingdom: Fungi
- Division: Basidiomycota
- Class: Agaricomycetes
- Order: Cantharellales
- Family: Cantharellaceae
- Genus: Cantharellus
- Species: C. phasmatis

Binomial name
- Cantharellus phasmatis Foltz & T.J.Volk (2013)

= Cantharellus phasmatis =

Species of fungus

Cantharellus phasmatis is a species of fungus in the genus Cantharellus. Found in North America, it was described as new to science in 2013.

== Taxonomy ==
The species was collected and described from a specimen collected from Hixon Forest Park in La Crosse County, Wisconsin growing in mix deciduous forest.
