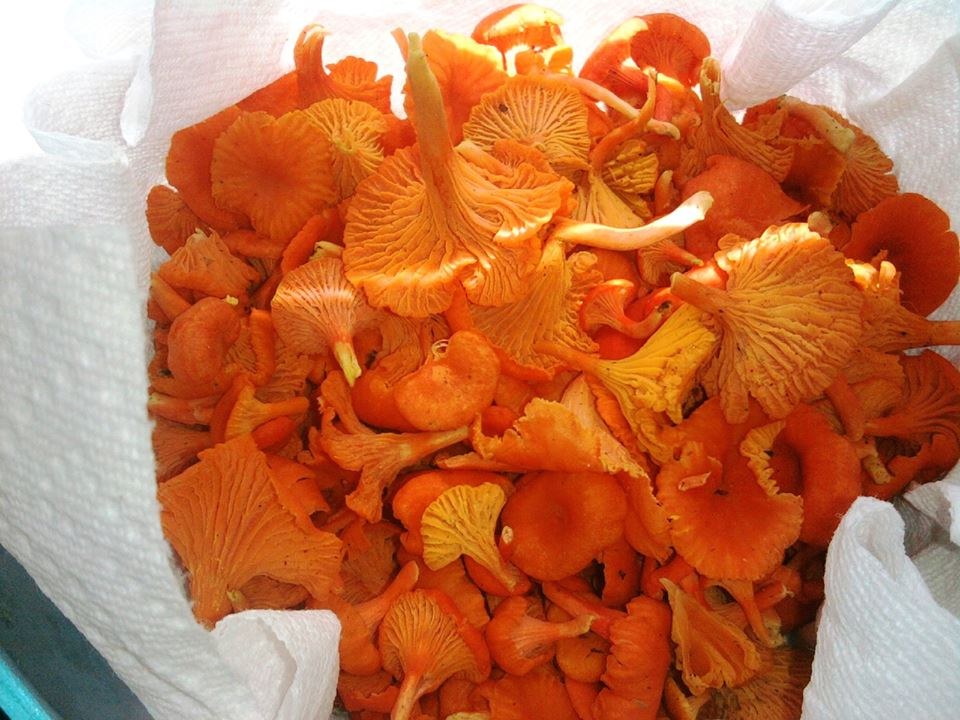

Scientific classification
- Kingdom: Fungi
- Division: Basidiomycota
- Class: Agaricomycetes
- Order: Cantharellales
- Family: Cantharellaceae
- Genus: Cantharellus
- Species: C. cinnabarinus

Binomial name
- Cantharellus cinnabarinus (Schwein.) Schwein. 1832

Synonyms
- Agaricus cinnabarinus Schwein. 1822; Chanterel cinnabarinus (Schwein.) Murrill 1913

= Cantharellus cinnabarinus =

Species of fungus

Cantharellus cinnabarinus
- Mycological characteristics
- Ridges on hymenium
- Cap is infundibuliform
- Hymenium is decurrent
- Stipe is bare
- Spore print is white to pink
- Ecology is mycorrhizal
- Edibility is edible

Cantharellus cinnabarinus, the red chanterelle, is a species of fungus. It is a member of the genus Cantharellus along with other chanterelles. Its distinctive red color is imparted by the carotenoid canthaxanthin. Widely distributed in eastern Northern America, it fruits in association with hardwood trees in the summer and fall.

== Etymology ==
It is named after cinnabar, which has a similar red color.

== Description ==
Cantharellus cinnabarinus is recognized by its distinctive flamingo-pink to bright orange and red colors (imparted by the carotenoid canthaxanthin) and the presence of false gills underneath the cap. The fruitbodies can grow up to 7 centimetres (2 3/4 in) across.

It resembles some other species of Cantharellus, but tends to be more small and slender. Its forked gills distinguish it from Hygrocybe.

== Distribution and habitat ==
Widely distributed in eastern Northern America, it fruits in association with hardwood trees. It can be found from June to October, mostly on the ground in broadleaf and mixed broadleaf/conifer forests. It usually occurs scattered or in small groups. It forms mycorrhizal associations with forest trees and shows preference for acidic soils.

== Uses ==
It is considered edible and good.
