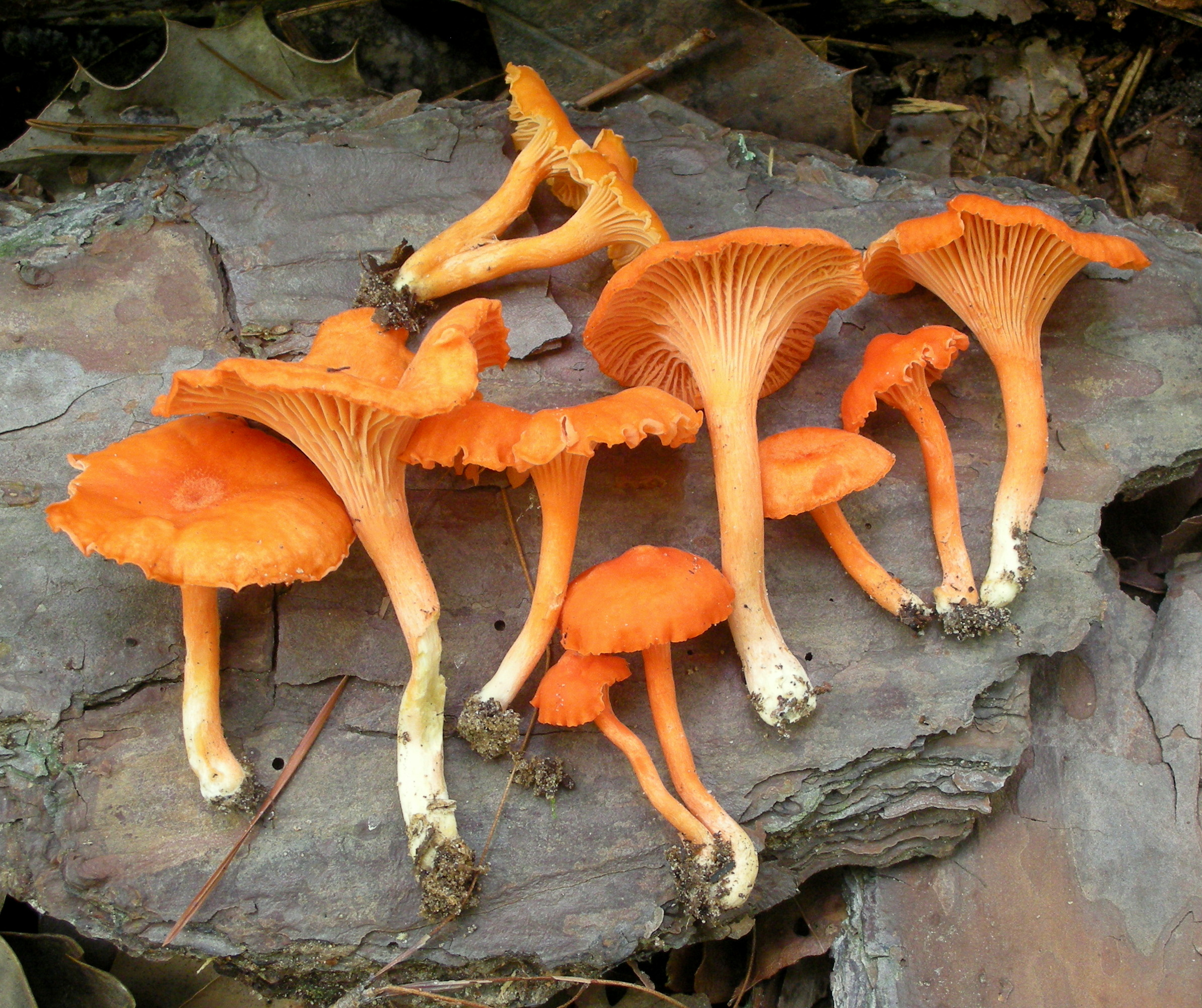

Scientific classification
- Domain: Eukaryota
- Kingdom: Fungi
- Division: Basidiomycota
- Class: Agaricomycetes
- Order: Cantharellales
- Family: Cantharellaceae
- Genus: Cantharellus
- Species: C. texensis

Binomial name
- Cantharellus texensis Buyck & V. Hofstetter 2011

= Cantharellus texensis =

Species of fungus

Cantharellus texensis, the Texas chanterelle, is a species of Cantharellus from Gulf of Mexico states and eastern United States.
