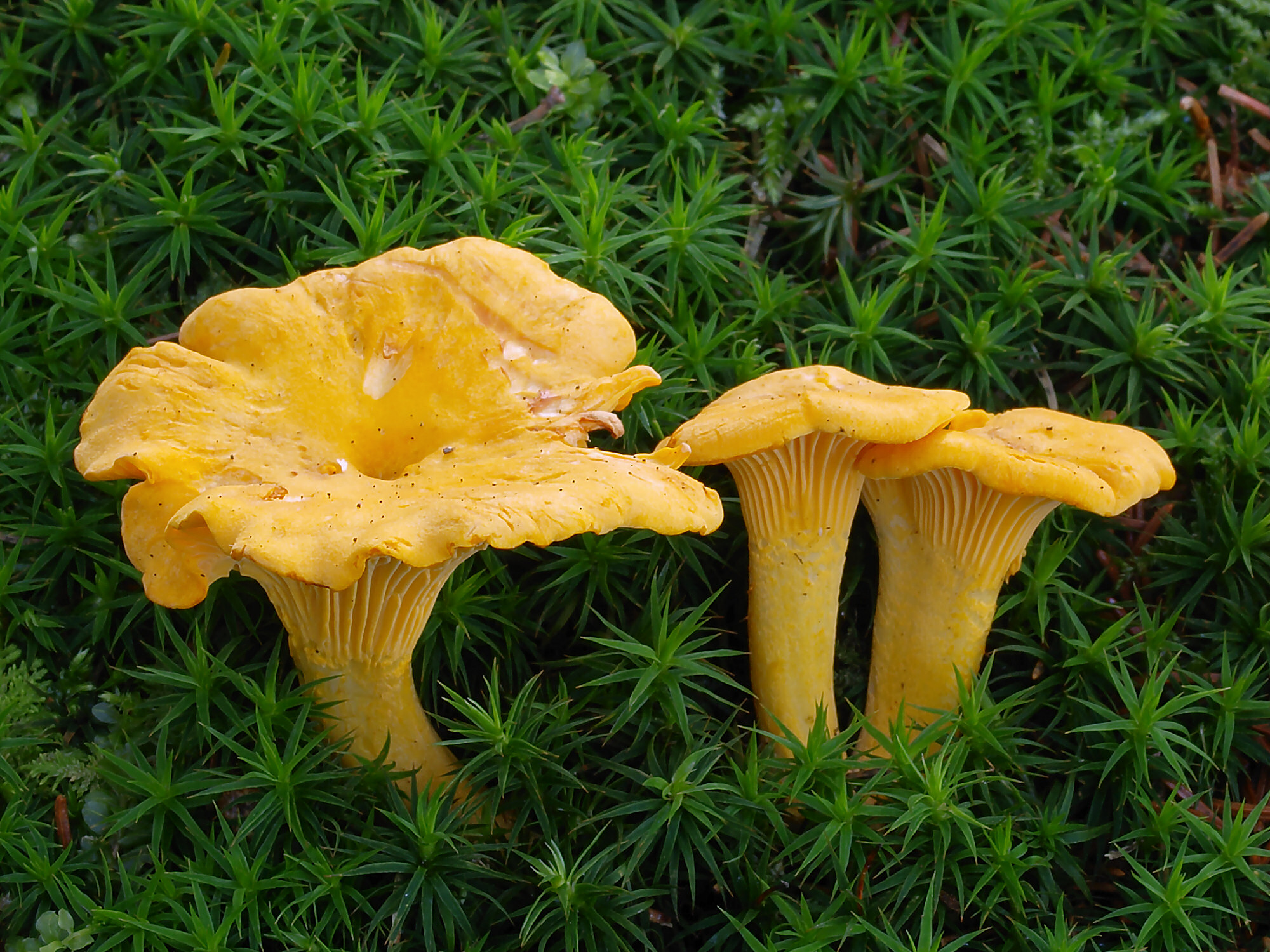
- Cantharellus cibarius

Scientific classification
- Kingdom: Fungi
- Division: Basidiomycota
- Class: Agaricomycetes
- Order: Cantharellales
- Family: Cantharellaceae
- Genus: Cantharellus; Adans. ex Fr.

Type species
- Cantharellus cibarius Fr.

= Cantharellus =

Genus of fungi

Cantharellus
- Mycological characteristics
- Ridges on hymenium
- Cap is infundibuliform
- Hymenium is decurrent
- Stipe is bare
- Spore print is yellow
- Ecology is mycorrhizal
- Edibility is choice or edible

Cantharellus is a genus of mushrooms, commonly known as chanterelles (/ˌʃæntəˈrɛl/), a name which can also refer to the type species, Cantharellus cibarius. They are mycorrhizal fungi, meaning they form symbiotic associations with plants. Chanterelles may resemble a number of other species, some of which are poisonous.

The name comes from the Greek word kantharos ('tankard, cup'). Chanterelles are one of the most recognized and harvested groups of edible mushrooms.

- - - - C. appalachiensis
      - C. minor
    - C. cinnabarinus
  - - - - - - C. subalbidus
            - C. cibarius
          - C. cascadensis
        - C. formosus
      - C. persicinus
    - C. lateritius

Phylogenetic relationships of some Cantharellus species based on ribosomal RNA sequences.

== Description ==
Mushrooms in the genus are generally shaped like cups or trumpets. The hue is mostly yellow, with the gills sometimes pinkish.

=== Similar species ===
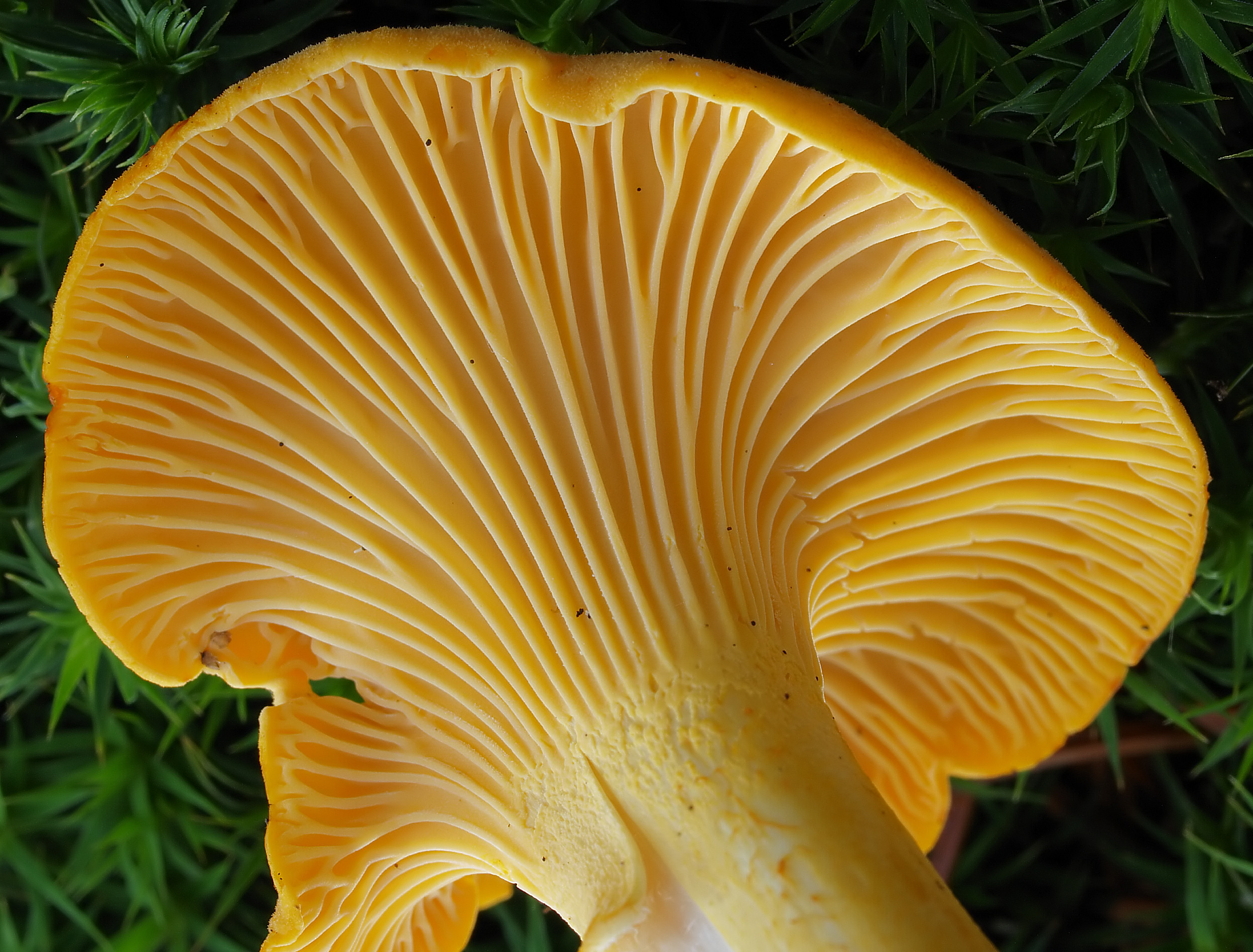
Decurrent ridged hymenium ("false gills") on the underside of the cap of Cantharellus cibarius

The false chanterelle (Hygrophoropsis aurantiaca) has finer, more orange gills and a darker cap. It is sometimes regarded as poisonous.

The very similar jack-o'-lantern mushroom (Omphalotus olearius) and its sister species (Omphalotus olivascens) are very poisonous, though not lethal. They have true gills (unlike chanterelles) which are thinner, have distinct crowns, and generally do not reach up to the edge. Additionally, the jack-o-lantern mushroom is bioluminescent and grows on wood – possibly buried – whereas Cantharellus species grow on the ground.

Species in the genera Craterellus, Gomphus, and Polyozellus may also look like chanterelles.

== Taxonomy ==
The genus Cantharellus is large and has a complex taxonomic history. Index Fungorum lists over 500 scientific names that have been applied to the genus, although the number of currently valid names is less than 100. In addition to synonymy, many species have been moved into other genera such as Afrocantharellus, Arrhenia, Craterellus, Gomphus, Hygrophoropsis, and Pseudocraterellus. Molecular phylogenetic analyses are providing new information about relationships between chanterelle populations. The genus has been divided into eight subgenera Afrocantharellus Eyssart. & Buyck, Cantharellus Adans. ex Fr., Cinnabarinus Buyck & V. Hofst., Magni T. Cao & H.S. Yuan, Parvocantharellus Eyssart. & Buyck, Pseudocantharellus Eyssart. & Buyck, and Rubrini Eyssart. & Buyck.

- Cantharellus
  - - - - - Rubrini Eyssart. & Buyck.
          - Cantharellus Adans. ex Fr.
        - Pseudocantharellus Eyssart. & Buyck
      - - Parvocantharellus Eyssart. & Buyck
        - Cinnabarinus Buyck & V. Hofst.
  - - Afrocantharellus Eyssart. & Buyck
    - Magni T. Cao & H.S. Yuan

=== Selected species ===
- C. afrocibarius – Africa
- C. altipes – southeastern United States
- C. amazonensis – South America
- C. amethysteus – Europe
- C. appalachiensis – eastern North America, China
- C. applanatus – India, China, Japan, Korea
- C. aurantioconspicuus – Brazil
- C. californicus – the oak chanterelle
- C. cascadensis – the Pacific Northwest of North America
- C. cibarioides – Africa
- C. cibarius – golden chanterelle, Europe, Northeastern China, Japan
- C. chicagoensis - Chicago, United States
- C. cinereus – the ashen chanterelle
- C. cinnabarinus- red chantrelle
- C. coccolobae – the Caribbean, the Bahamas, and Florida
- C. concinnus – the Australian chanterelle
- C. congolensis - Africa
- C. eccentricus – New Caledonia
- C. densifolius
- C. elegans
- C. flavus - midwestern and southern United States
- C. floridulus
- C. formosus – California and the Pacific Northwest of North America
- C. friesii – the orange chanterelle
- C. garnierii
- C. gracilis – Africa
- C. guyanensis – South America
- C. humidicolus – Africa
- C. incrassatus – Malaysia
- C. isabellinus
- C. lateritius – the smooth chanterelle
- C. lewisii – southeastern United States
- C. lilacinus – Australia
- C. luteopunctatus – Africa
- C. minor
- C. miomboensis – Africa
- C. neocaledonicus – New Caledonia
- C. pallens - frosted chanterelle
- C. persicinus – the peach chanterelle
- C. phasmatis - the ghost chanterelle, midwestern United States
- C. pleurotoides – Guyana
- C. pseudocibarius
- C. pseudoformosus – found with deodar cedar in India
- C. protectus – South America
- C. quercophilus – southeastern United States
- C. rhodophyllus
- C. roseocanus
- C. ruber
- C. spectaculus - the spectacular chanterelle, midwestern United States
- C. subalbidus – western North America
- C. sublaevis – Africa
- C. subpruinosus – Europe
- C. tabernensis – southeastern United States and Mexico
- C. tanzanicus – Africa
- C. tenuithrix – southeastern United States
- C. texensis – southeastern United States
- C. tomentosus
- C. vaginatus – China
- C. zangii – China

=== Etymology ===
The name comes from the Latin cantharus 'large drinking cup with handles', borrowed from the Greek κάνθαρος, kantharos 'tankard, cup'.

== Distribution and habitat ==
Cantharellus species are found throughout the world in association with mycorrhizal host plants, including Africa, Europe, Asia, North America, South America, and Australia.

== Ecology ==
Chanterelles are associated with either conifers or hardwood trees, depending on species. They are often found with oaks in California, Texas. and Mexico. In Scotland, chanterelles grow in mixed forests of silver birch and Scots pine, especially when the forest has plenty of moist, mossy undergrowth. In Fife they are common under beech. They are usually (but not always) found in the same places as wild blueberries. In Spain they associate with sweet chestnut. They are abundant after rainfall from late July through autumn. In the coastal forests of Washington and British Columbia, they are often found in damp, mossy riparian zones in the vicinity of western hemlock.

== Uses ==
Many species of chanterelles contain antioxidant carotenoids, such as beta-carotene in C. cibarius and C. minor, and canthaxanthin in C. cinnabarinus and C. friesii. They also contain significant amounts of vitamin D.

Their mycorrhizal nature makes the species very difficult to cultivate.

=== Culinary ===
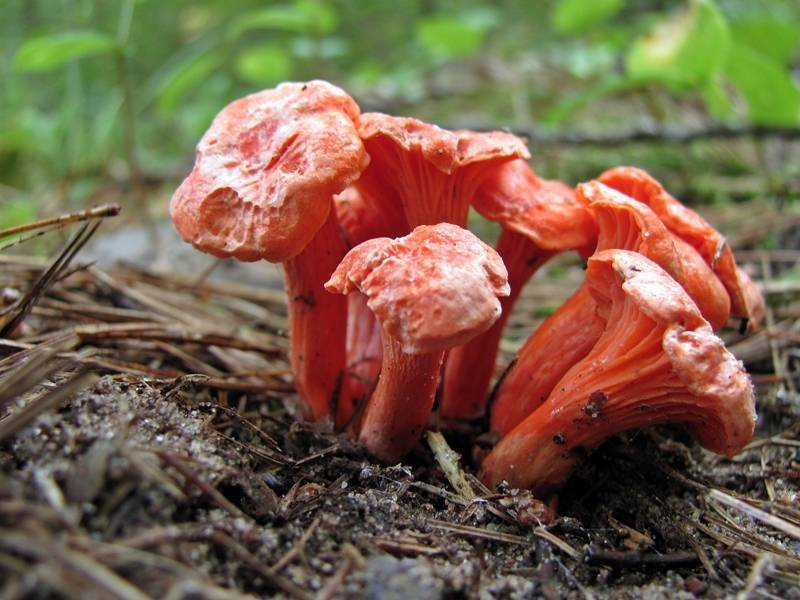
C. cinnabarinus

Chanterelles in general go well with eggs, curry, chicken, pork, fish, beef and veal, can be used as toppings on pizzas, be stewed, marinated, sauteed, or used as filling for stuffed crêpes. Of course these are just examples; chanterelles are versatile and can be added as an ingredient to most dishes.

In European cuisine, chanterelles are often served with venison. A traditional method of preparing these mushrooms is sauteed and then used to make scrambled eggs.

In Polish tradition, chanterelles are used for making creamy sauces that top chicken.

Many mushroom enthusiasts just like chanterelles sauteed in butter, with a pinch of salt, a clove of fresh crushed garlic, and some whipping cream. This recipe is said to bring out the subtle flavor of the chanterelle without masking it with other aromas. This recipe has the added benefit of retaining flavor even after being stored frozen.

It is a feature of Viennese cuisine.

==== Preparation and storage ====
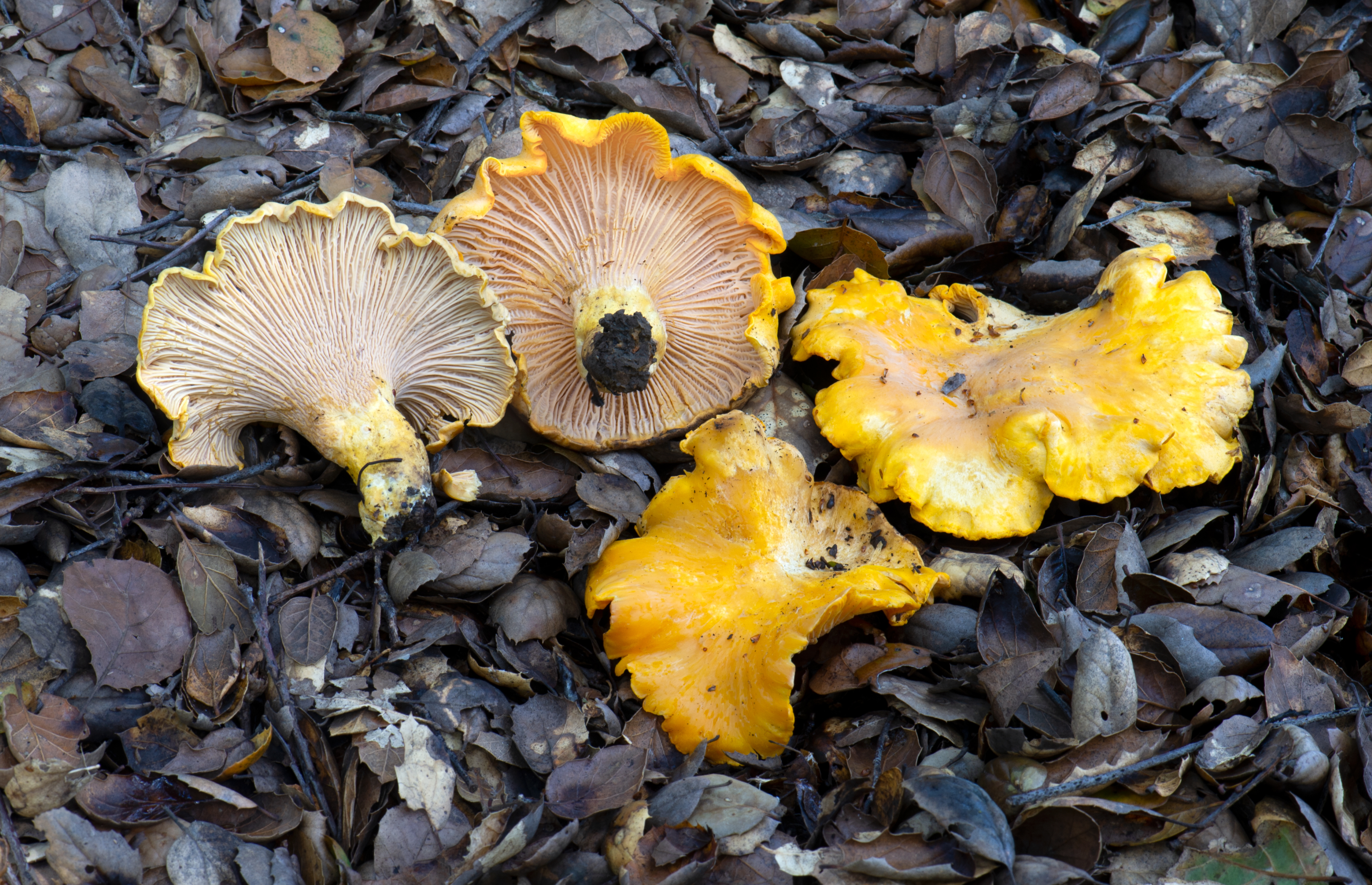
C. californicus

Since the mushrooms hold a lot of water, they are often prepared using a "dry sauté" method: after cleaning, the mushrooms are sliced and put in a covered pan over high heat with no oil or butter. The mushrooms then release much of their water, which can be allowed to boil off or be poured off and used as a stock. Many people often cook the mushrooms with butter because it "sweetens" them.

Chanterelles can also be pickled in brine. Salted water is brought to a boil and pickling spices such as peppercorns, mustard seeds, and thyme are added. The mushrooms are then cooked in this solution for 5–10 minutes before being transferred to sterilized bottles along with some of the liquid. Sliced garlic and dill can be added to the bottles for extra flavor. The remaining liquid forms an excellent stock for making soup. When pickled in this way, chanterelles can last from six to twelve months.

Another storage technique is drying. Mushrooms can be dried with gentle heat in an oven at temperatures of 65 °C (150 °F) or less. A vacuum process is also practical on large orders. A few hours before final preparation, put dry mushrooms in water which they absorb for returning to nearly original size. Mushrooms can then be used as fresh and will last indefinitely as dry.

Fresh chanterelles can generally be stored up to ten days in a refrigerator.
