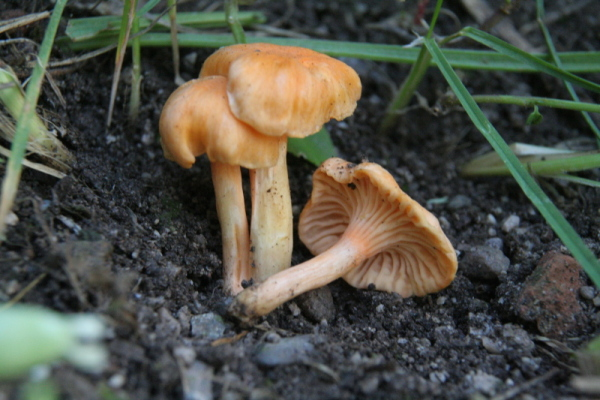

Scientific classification
- Domain: Eukaryota
- Kingdom: Fungi
- Division: Basidiomycota
- Class: Agaricomycetes
- Order: Cantharellales
- Family: Cantharellaceae
- Genus: Cantharellus
- Species: C. friesii

Binomial name
- Cantharellus friesii Quél. (1872)

Synonyms
- Merulius friesii (Quél.) Kuntze (1891)

= Cantharellus friesii =

Species of fungus

Cantharellus friesii Mycological characteristics
- Ridges on hymenium
- Cap is infundibuliform
- Hymenium is decurrent
- Stipe is bare
- Spore print is yellow
- Ecology is mycorrhizal
- Edibility is edible

Cantharellus friesii, the orange or velvet chanterelle, is a fungus native to Asia and Europe. The cap color varies from deep yellow to reddish orange and is 2–4 cm wide. It occurs in beech, fir and spruce forests. C. friesii is considered a good edible mushroom, but because of its rarity, it deserves to be mindfully managed with limited use of fungicides if discovered on residential or commercial property. Harvesting the fruit bodies of the fungus will allow for further propagation of the species as its spores are dispersed along the collector's travels. The specific epithet friesii honors the mycologist Elias Magnus Fries.
