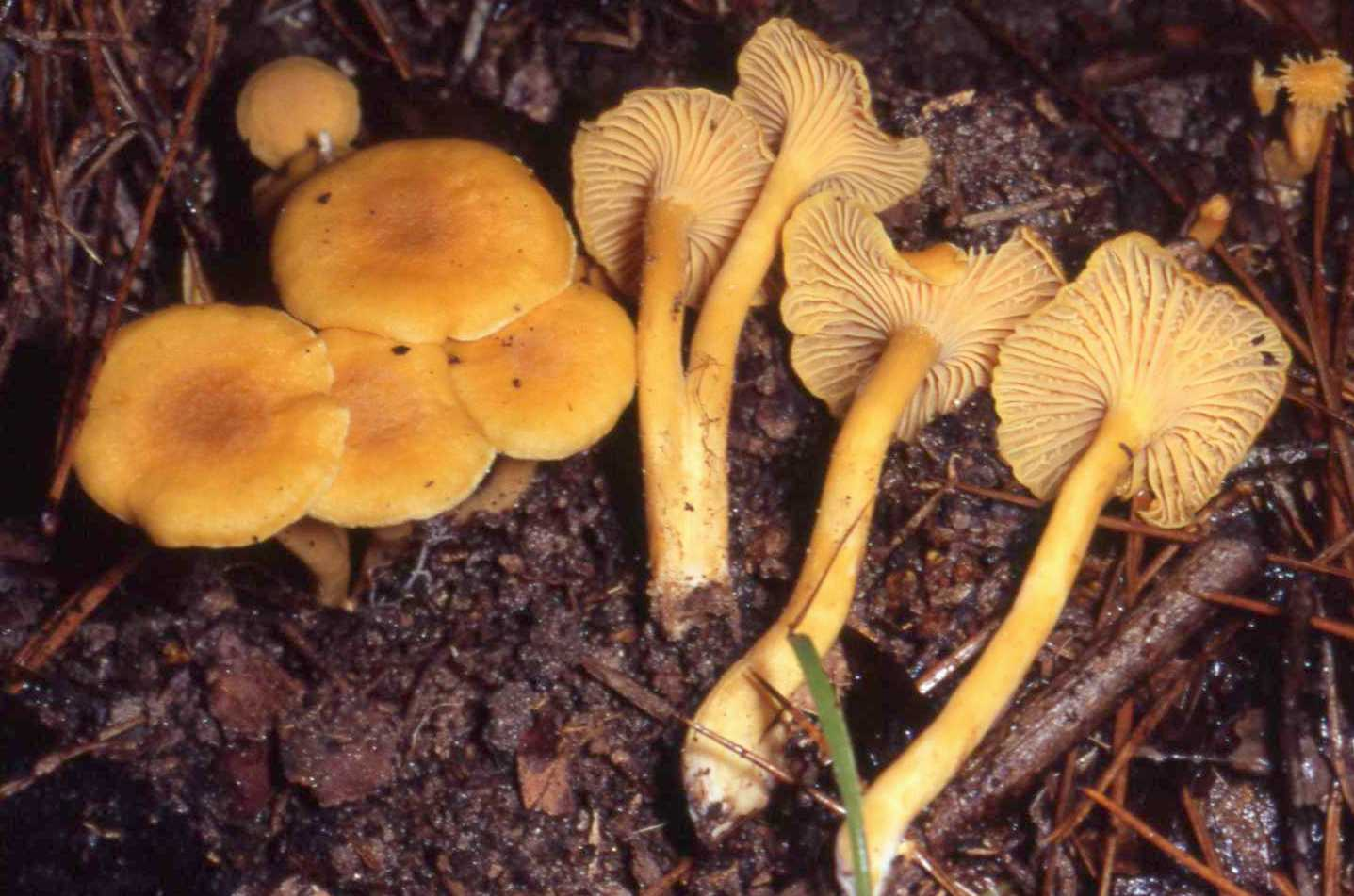

Scientific classification
- Domain: Eukaryota
- Kingdom: Fungi
- Division: Basidiomycota
- Class: Agaricomycetes
- Order: Cantharellales
- Family: Cantharellaceae
- Genus: Cantharellus
- Species: C. tabernensis

Binomial name
- Cantharellus tabernensis Feib. & Cibula (1996)

= Cantharellus tabernensis =

Species of fungus

Cantharellus tabernensis is a species of fungus in the family Cantharellaceae that was described as new to science in 1996. It is found in the southern United States, where it grows in mixed pine and hardwood forests, close to mature Pinus elliottii trees. Fruit bodies have a yellowish-brown cap with a slightly darker brown center, and a bright orange gills and stipe. The specific epithet tabernensis refers to the meeting house at the Stennis Space Center Recreation area, near the type locality.
