= Chanterelle =

Common name of several species of fungi

- Mycological characteristics
- Ridges on hymenium
- Cap is infundibuliform
- Hymenium is decurrent
- Stipe is bare
- Spore print is yellow to white
- Ecology is mycorrhizal
- Edibility is edible or choice

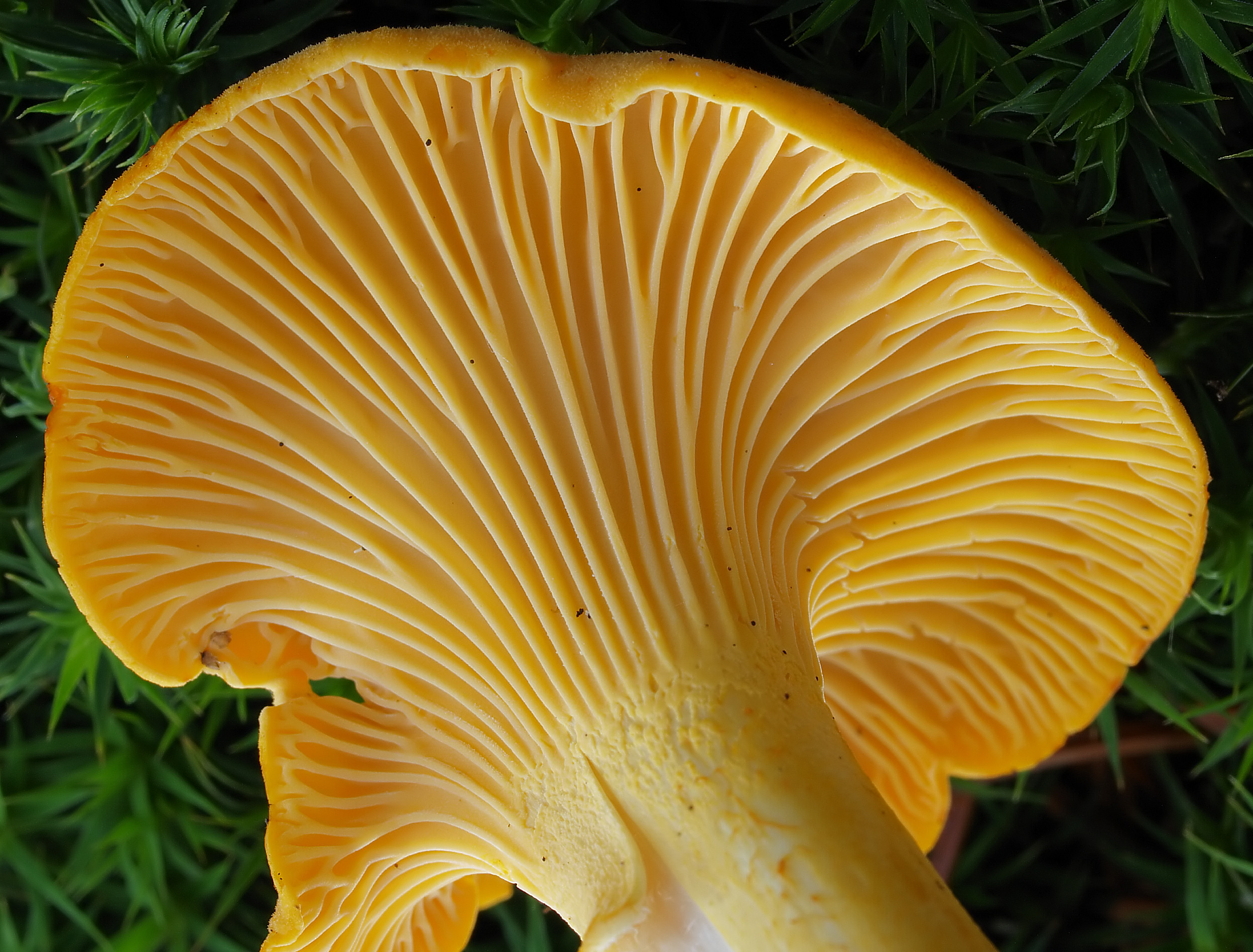
One of several species called "chanterelle", Cantharellus cibarius

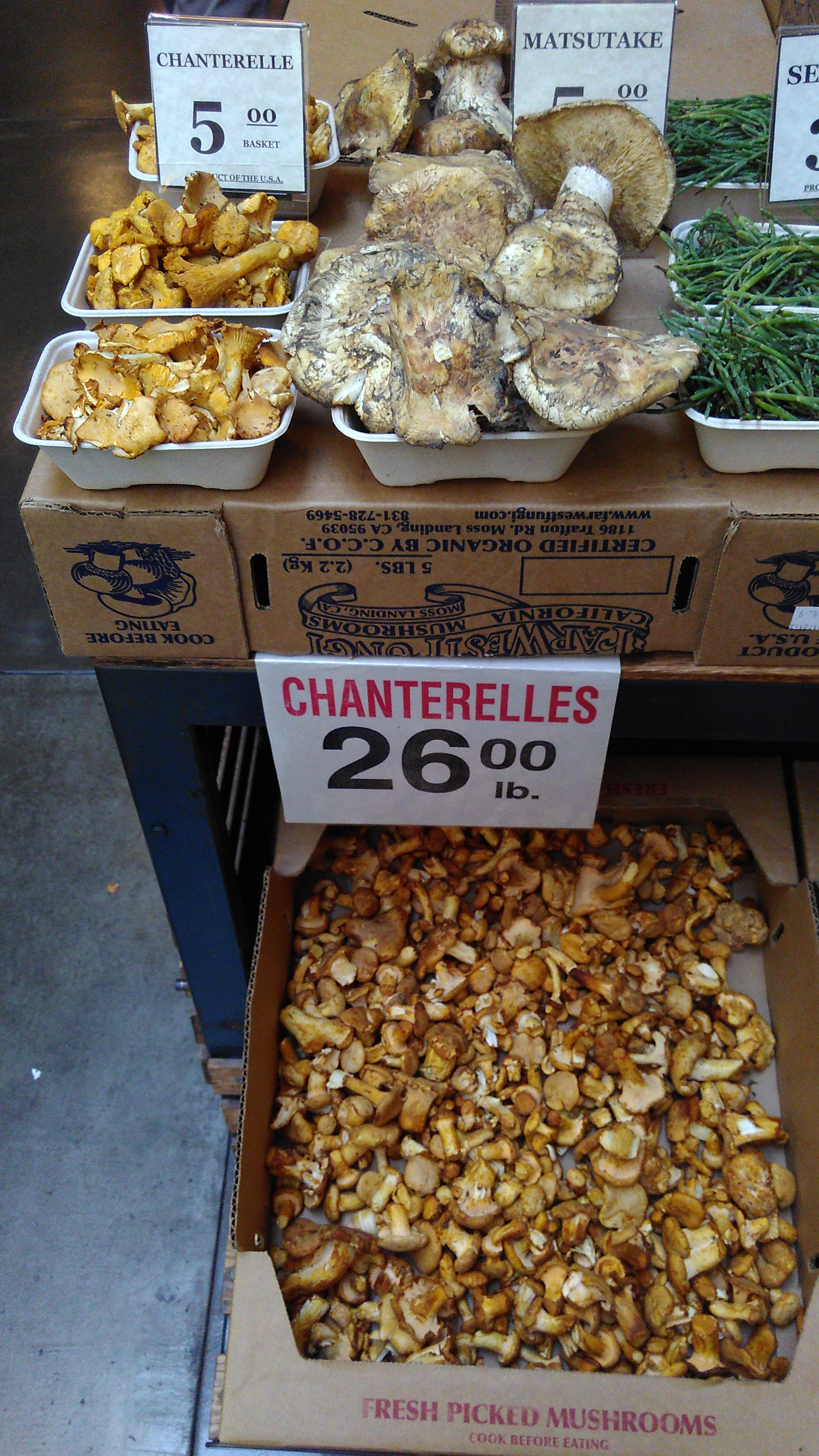
Chanterelles on sale in San Francisco

Chanterelle is the common name of several species of agaricomycetous fungi in the genera Cantharellus, Craterellus, Gomphus and Polyozellus. These fungi are orange, yellow or white, meaty and funnel-shaped. On the lower surface, most species have rounded, forked folds that run almost all the way down the stipe, which tapers down from the cap. Many species emit a fruity aroma and often have a mildly peppery taste.

Chanterelles are found in Eurasia, North America and Africa, typically growing in forested areas. They initially gained popularity as an edible mushroom in the 18th century via their inclusion in French cuisine.

== Etymology ==
The name chanterelle originates from the Greek kantharos meaning "tankard" or "cup", a reference to their general shape. Its German name, Pfifferling, refers to its peppery taste.

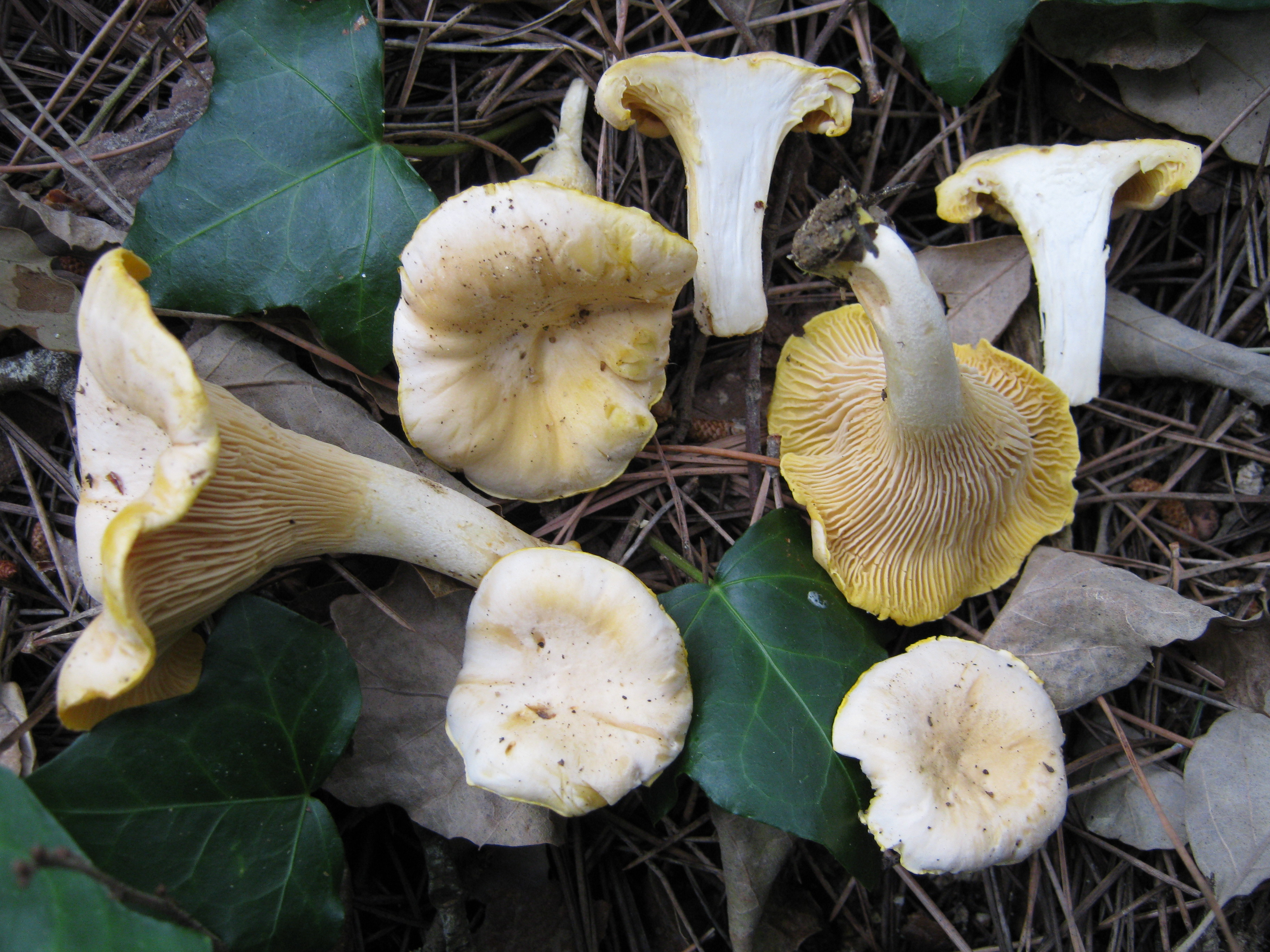
Cantharellus pallens

== Taxonomy ==
At one time, all yellow or golden chanterelles in western North America had been classified as Cantharellus cibarius. Using DNA analysis, they have since been shown to be a group of related species. In 1997, the Pacific golden chanterelle (C. formosus) and C. cibarius var. roseocanus were identified, followed by C. cascadensis in 2003, C. californicus in 2008, and C. enelensis in 2017. C. cibarius var. roseocanus occurs in the Pacific Northwest in Sitka spruce forests, as well as Eastern Canada in association with Pinus banksiana.

=== Species ===
An incomplete listing of species that have been called chanterelles includes:

- Cantharellus californicus
- Cantharellus cascadensis
- Cantharellus cibarius, which has been split into several species
- Cantharellus cinnabarinus
- Cantharellus enelensis
- Cantharellus formosus
- Cantharellus lateritius
- Cantharellus minor
- Cantharellus roseocanus
- Cantharellus subalbidus
- Craterellus cinereus
- Craterellus cornucopioides
- Craterellus ignicolor
- Craterellus tubaeformis
- Merulius odoratus
- Gomphus clavatus
- Polyozellus multiplex

== Description ==
The mushrooms are orange, yellow or white, meaty and funnel-shaped. On the lower surface, underneath the smooth cap, most species have rounded, forked folds that run almost all the way down the stipe, which tapers down seamlessly from the cap. Many species emit a fruity aroma, reminiscent of apricots, and often have a mildly peppery taste.

Cantharellus pallens has sometimes been defined as a species in its own right, but it is normally considered to be just a variety (C. cibarius var. pallens). Unlike "true" C. cibarius it yellows and then reddens when touched and has a weaker smell. Eyssartier and Roux classify it as a separate species but say that 90% of the chanterelles sold in French markets are this, not C. cibarius.

Similarly, the very pale C. alborufescens, which reddens easily and is found in Mediterranean areas, and northern of Iran is sometimes distinguished as a separate variety or a separate species.

=== Similar species ===
The false chanterelle (Hygrophoropsis aurantiaca) has a similar appearance and can be confused with the chanterelle. Distinguishing factors are that false chanterelles have true gills, while chanterelles have folds. Additionally, color can help distinguish the two; the true chanterelle is uniform egg-yellow, while the false chanterelle is more orange in hue and graded, with darker center. The true chanterelle's folds are typically more wrinkled or rounded, and randomly forked. Though once thought to be hazardous, it is now known that the false chanterelle is edible but, according to Edible Wild Mushrooms of North America, not especially tasty, and ingesting it may result in mild gastrointestinal distress. The poisonous species in the genus Omphalotus (the jack-o'-lantern mushrooms) have been misidentified as chanterelles, but can usually be distinguished by their well-developed, unforked true gills. (Note: In the case of Omphalotus olivascens, the gills may be blade-like.) Species of Omphalotus are not closely related to chanterelles. Other species in the closely related genera Cantharellus and Craterellus may appear similar to the golden chanterelle.

Turbinellus floccosus is sometimes mistaken for a chanterelle due to its orange colour and vein-like hymenium. However, it can be distinguished by its distinctly vase-like form, scaly cap surface, and generally hollow stem.

== Distribution and habitat ==
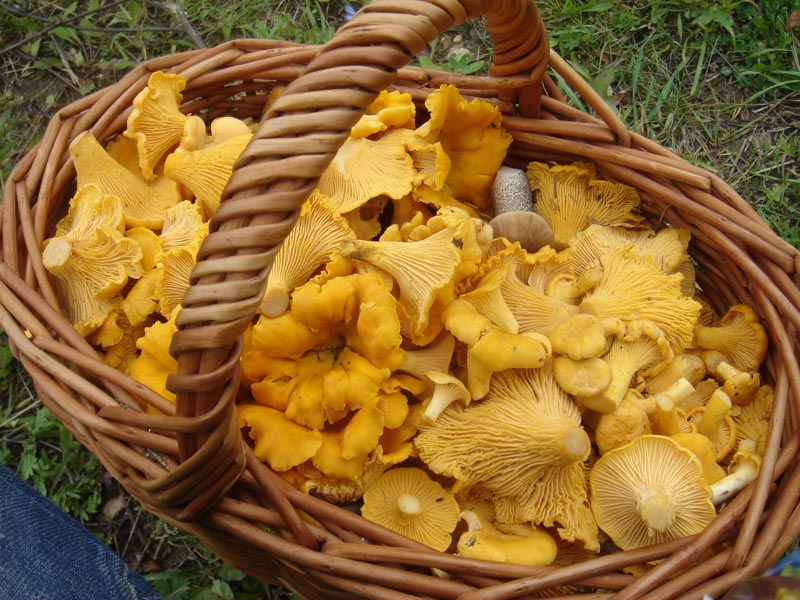
A basket of freshly cut chanterelles

Chanterelles are common in Eurasia, North America (including Central America) and Africa. In the American Pacific Northwest, they can be found from July to November. They tend to grow in clusters in mossy coniferous forests, but are also often found in mountainous birch forests and among grasses and low-growing herbs. In central Europe, the golden chanterelle is often found in beech forests among similar species and forms. In the UK, they may be found from July through December.

Chanterelle mushrooms, raw
Nutritional value per 100 g (3.5 oz)
- Energy: 160 kJ (38 kcal)
- Carbohydrates: 6.86 g
- Sugars: 1.16 g
- Dietary fiber: 3.8 g
- Fat: 0.53 g
- Protein: 1.49 g
Vitamins and minerals
Vitamins	Quantity %DV^{†}
Riboflavin (B2)	17% 0.215 mg
Niacin (B3)	26% 4.085 mg
Pantothenic acid (B5)	22% 1.075 mg
Vitamin B6	3% 0.044 mg
Vitamin D	27% 5.3 μg
Minerals	Quantity %DV^{†}
Calcium	1% 15 mg
Iron	19% 3.47 mg
Magnesium	3% 13 mg
Manganese	12% 0.286 mg
Phosphorus	5% 57 mg
Potassium	17% 506 mg
Sodium	0% 9 mg
Zinc	6% 0.71 mg
- Other constituents: Quantity
- Water: 90 g
- Link to USDA Database entry
- ^{†}Percentages estimated using US recommendations for adults, except for potassium, which is estimated based on expert recommendation from the National Academies.

== Uses ==
=== Nutrition ===
Raw chanterelle mushrooms are 90% water, 7% carbohydrates, including 4% dietary fiber, 1.5% protein, and have negligible fat. A 100 gram reference amount of raw chanterelles supplies 38 kilocalories of food energy and the B vitamins, niacin and pantothenic acid, in rich content (20% or more of the Daily Value, DV), 27% DV of iron, with moderate contents (10-1 of riboflavin, manganese, and potassium (table).

When exposed to sunlight, raw chanterelles produce a rich amount of vitamin D2 (35% DV) – also known as ergocalciferol.

=== Culinary ===
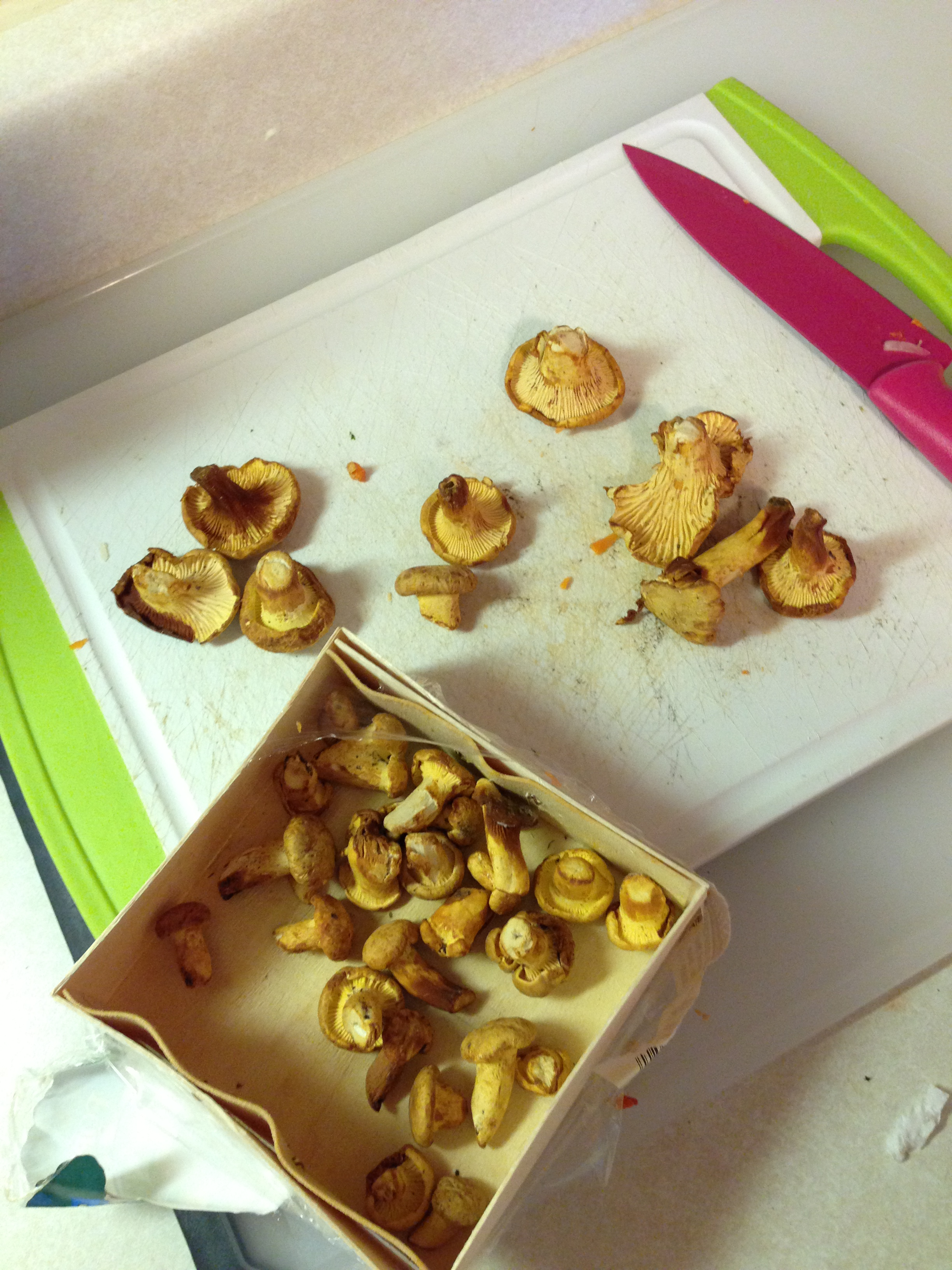
Chanterelles to cook

Though records of chanterelles being eaten date back to the 16th century, they first gained widespread recognition as a culinary delicacy with the spreading influence of French cuisine in the 18th century, when they began appearing in palace kitchens. For many years, they remained notable for being served at the tables of nobility. Nowadays, the usage of chanterelles in the kitchen is common throughout Europe and North America. In 1836, the Swedish mycologist Elias Fries considered the chanterelle "as one of the most important and best edible mushrooms."

Chanterelles as a group are generally described as being rich in flavor, with a distinctive taste and aroma difficult to characterize. Some species have a fruity odor, others a more woody, earthy fragrance, and still others can even be considered spicy. The golden chanterelle is perhaps the most sought-after and flavorful chanterelle, and many chefs consider it on the same short list of gourmet fungi as truffles and morels. It therefore tends to command a high price in both restaurants and specialty stores.

There are many ways to cook chanterelles. Most of the flavorful compounds in chanterelles are fat-soluble, making them good mushrooms to sauté in butter, oil or cream. They also contain smaller amounts of water- and alcohol-soluble flavorings, which lend the mushrooms well to recipes involving wine or other cooking alcohols. Many popular methods of cooking chanterelles include them in sautés, soufflés, cream sauces, and soups. They are not typically eaten raw, as their rich and complex flavor is best released when cooked.

Chanterelles are also well-suited for drying, and tend to maintain their aroma and consistency quite well. Some chefs profess that reconstituted chanterelles are actually superior in flavor to fresh ones, though they lose in texture by becoming more chewy after being preserved by drying. Dried chanterelles can also be crushed into flour and used in seasoning in soups or sauces. Chanterelles are also suitable for freezing, though older frozen chanterelles can often develop a slightly bitter taste after thawing.

One mushroom guide asserts, "Chanterelles are often dirty, and when washed they soak up water like a sponge...[try] dry-sauteeing...it concentrates their flavor while allowing you to wash them."

== In culture ==
In January 2024, the California golden chanterelle became the official mushroom of that state.
