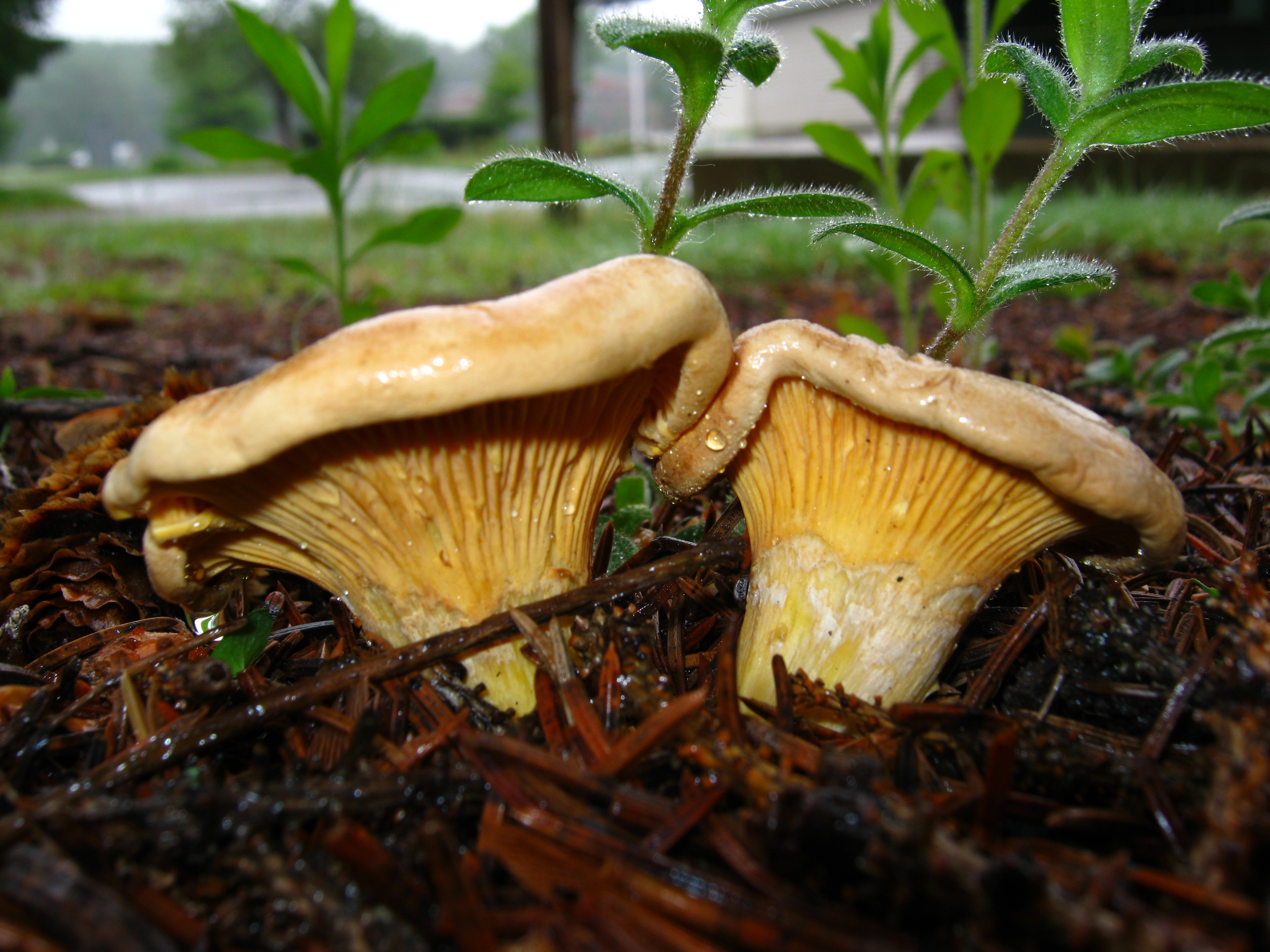

Scientific classification
- Kingdom: Fungi
- Division: Basidiomycota
- Class: Agaricomycetes
- Order: Cantharellales
- Family: Cantharellaceae
- Genus: Cantharellus
- Species: C. enelensis

Binomial name
- Cantharellus enelensis Voitk, Thorn, Lebeuf, J.I. Kim

= Cantharellus enelensis =

Species of fungus

Cantharellus enelensis
- Mycological characteristics
- Ridges on hymenium
- Cap is infundibuliform
- Hymenium is decurrent
- Stipe is bare
- Spore print is yellow-orange
- Ecology is mycorrhizal
- Edibility is edible

Cantharellus enelensis is one of several species of chanterelle native to North America, discovered in 2017 as a new member of the C. cibarius complex. It forms mycorrhizal relationships and is an edible mushroom.

== Taxonomy ==
Cantharellus enelensis was discovered in 2017 as a new member of the C. cibarius complex. It was temporarily categorized as having a conservation status of 'least concern'.

=== Etymology ===
The name enelensis is in honour of the Canadian province of Newfoundland and Labrador where the mushroom was first discovered.

== Description ==
Cantharellus enelensis has decurrent ridges that are forked, a cap that is from 2.5–11 centimetres (1–4 1/4 in) in diameter and can be infundibuliform in older specimens. The flesh is firm and white to pale yellow on the inside and can smell fruity, often described as apricot smelling. All tissues stain somewhat brownish with injury. The stipe is 5–25 mm × 30–75 mm, enlarging upwards from narrow base, solid, solitary; deep orange-yellow.

=== Similar species ===
Members of the C. cibarius complex in eastern North America are difficult to distinguish from one another without special techniques such as DNA sequencing and microscopic examinations.

Cantharellus. enelensis can be distinguished from C. cibarius by its yellow hymenophore, which is more orange in C. enelensis.

== Distribution and habitat ==
C. enelensis is one of 40 varieties of Cantharellus that grows in North America, which it is native to.

Chanterelles identified with DNA sequencing as C. enelensis have been found in Newfoundland, Quebec, Michigan and Illinois but there is evidence to suggest it is widespread in North American conifer forests. It is the most commonly found chanterelle in Newfoundland.

== Ecology ==
Cantharellus enelensis forms mycorrhizal relationships and grows in conifer forests more common under Picea than Abies, with well drained, moist, sandy soil.

The mushrooms bear fruiting bodies between July and September with the peak in August.

== Uses ==
Cantharellus enelensis is an edible mushroom.
