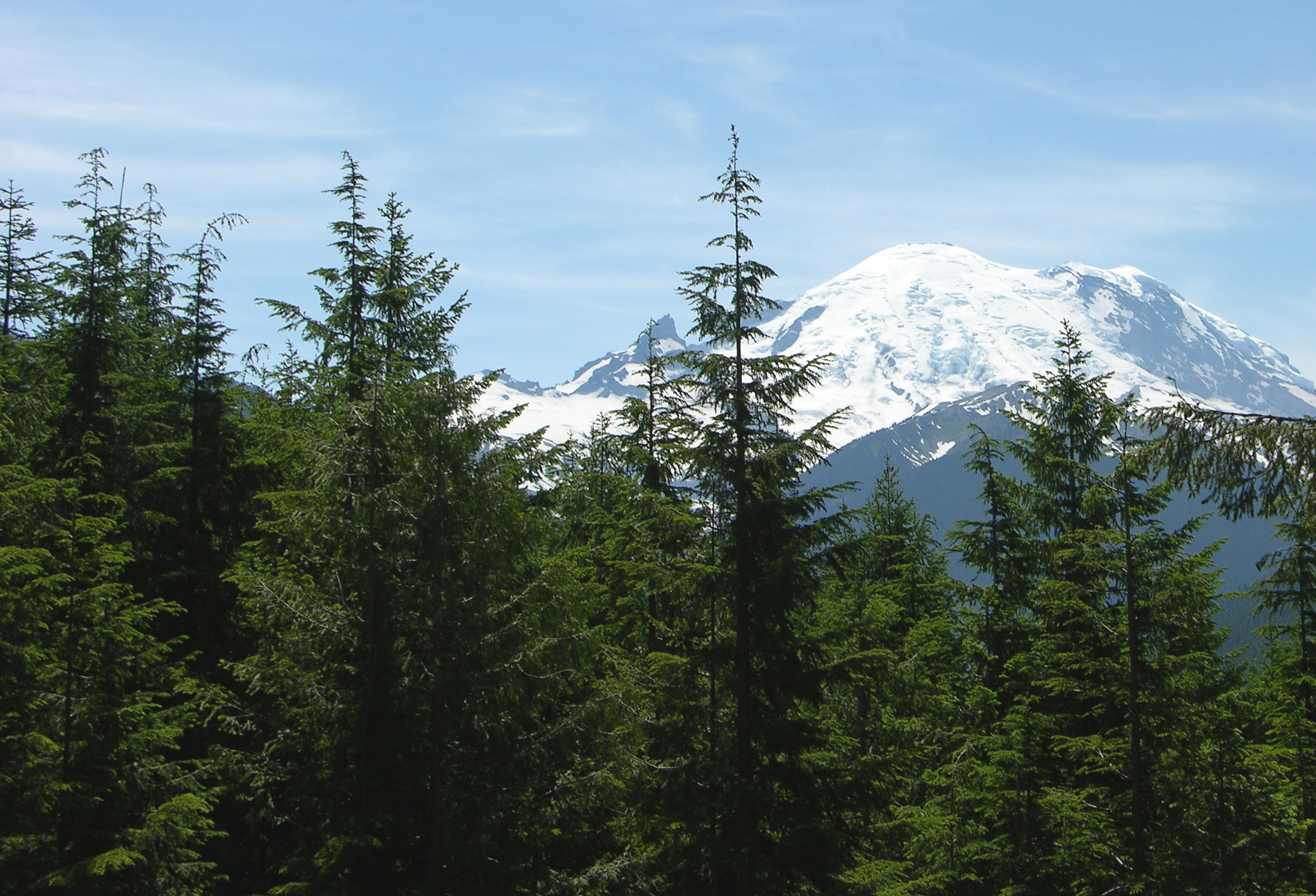

Conservation status
- Least Concern (IUCN 3.1)

- Secure (NatureServe)

Scientific classification
- Kingdom: Plantae
- Clade: Tracheophytes
- Clade: Gymnosperms
- Division: Pinophyta
- Class: Pinopsida
- Order: Pinales
- Family: Pinaceae
- Genus: Tsuga
- Species: T. heterophylla

Binomial name
- Tsuga heterophylla (Raf.) Sarg.
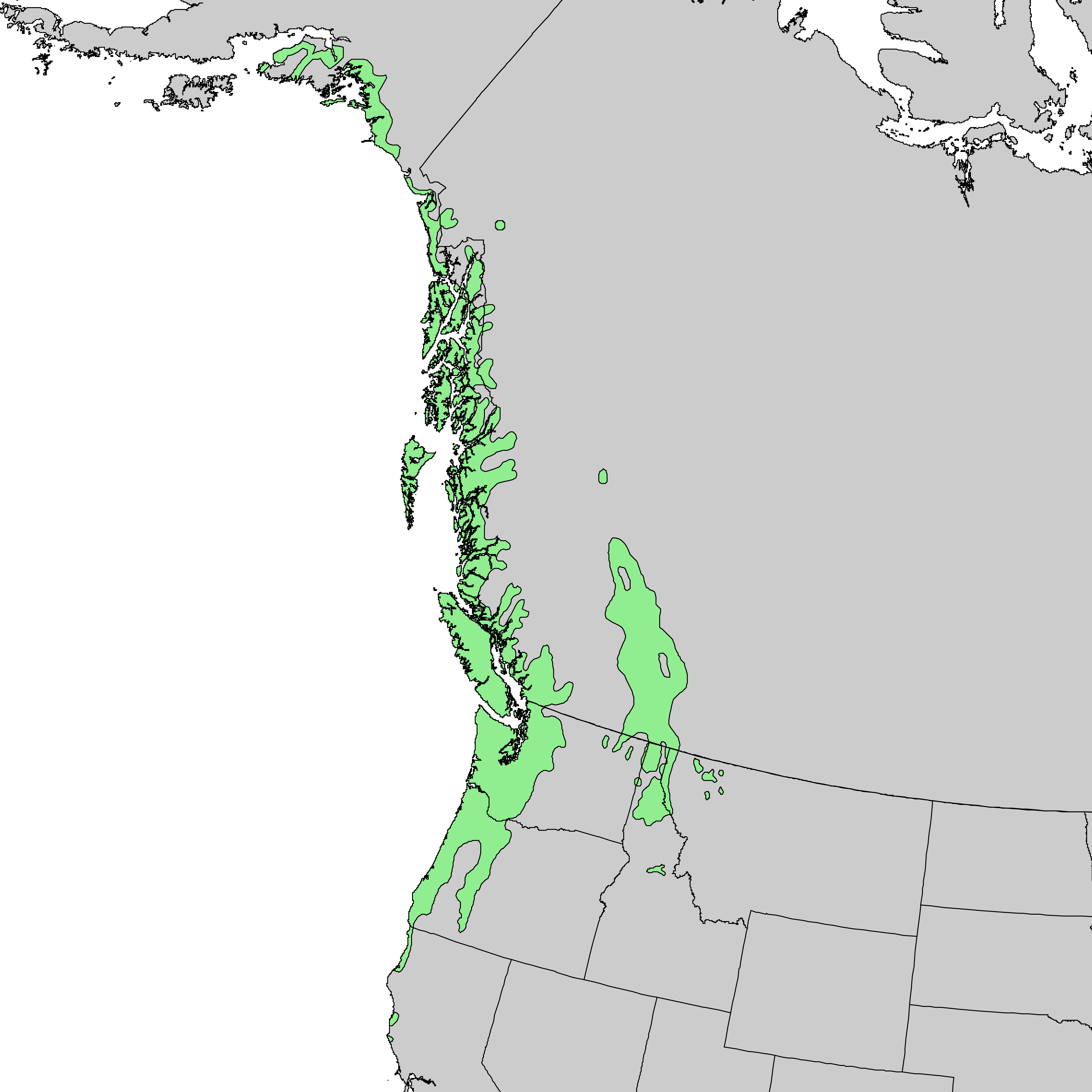
- Natural range

= Tsuga heterophylla =

Western hemlock

Species of conifer

Tsuga heterophylla, the western hemlock or western hemlock-spruce, is a species of conifer in the pine family, Pinaceae. It typically grows to 70 metres (230 feet) tall and is long-lived at high elevations. Native to the northwest coast of North America, it is a source of timber, tannin, and edible cambium.

== Description ==
Western hemlock is a large conifer growing to 50–70 metres (160–230 feet) tall, exceptionally 83 m (272 ft), and with a trunk diameter of up to 2.7 m (9 ft). It is the largest species of hemlock, with the next largest (T. mertensiana or mountain hemlock) reaching a maximum height of 59 m (194 ft). Western hemlock's bark is brown, thin, and furrowed (outwardly appearing similar to that of Douglas-fir). The crown is a very neat broad conic shape in young trees with a strongly drooping lead shoot, and becomes cylindrical in older trees, which may have no branches in the lowest 30–40 m (100–130 ft). At all ages, it is readily distinguished by the pendulous branchlet tips. The shoots are very pale buff-brown, almost white, with pale pubescence about 1 millimetre (1/32 in) long.

The leaves are needle-like, 5–25 mm (3/16–1 in) long and 1.5–2 mm (1/16–3/32 in) broad, strongly flattened in cross-section, with a finely serrated margin and a bluntly acute apex. They are mid to dark green above; the underside has two distinctive white bands of stomata with only a narrow green midrib between the bands. They are arranged spirally on the shoots but are twisted at the base to lie in two ranks on either side of the shoot. The cones appear on trees over about 25 years old; they are small, pendulous, slenderly cylindrical, 14–30 mm (1/2–1 1/8 in) long and 7–8 mm (1/4–5/16 in) broad when closed, opening to 18–25 mm (3/4–1 in) broad. They have 15–25 thin, flexible scales 7–13 mm (1/4–1/2 in) long. The immature cones are green, maturing gray-brown 5–7 months after pollination. They are usually plentiful enough to cover the ground beneath the tree. The abundant seeds are brown, 2–3 mm (1/16–1/8 in) long, with a slender, pale-brown wing measuring 7–9 mm (1/4–3/8 in) long.

Initial growth is slow; one-year-old seedlings are commonly only 3–5 centimetres (1 1/8–2 in) tall, and two-year-old seedlings 10–20 cm (4–8 in) tall. Once established, saplings in full light may have an average growth rate of 50–120 cm (20–47 in) (rarely 140 cm, 55 in) annually until they are 20–30 m (65–100 ft) tall, and in good conditions still 30–40 cm (12–16 in) annually when 40–50 m (130–165 ft) tall. The tallest specimen, 82.83 m (271 ft 9 in) tall, is in Prairie Creek Redwoods State Park, California. The species is long-lived, especially at higher elevations, with trees over 1,200 years old known.

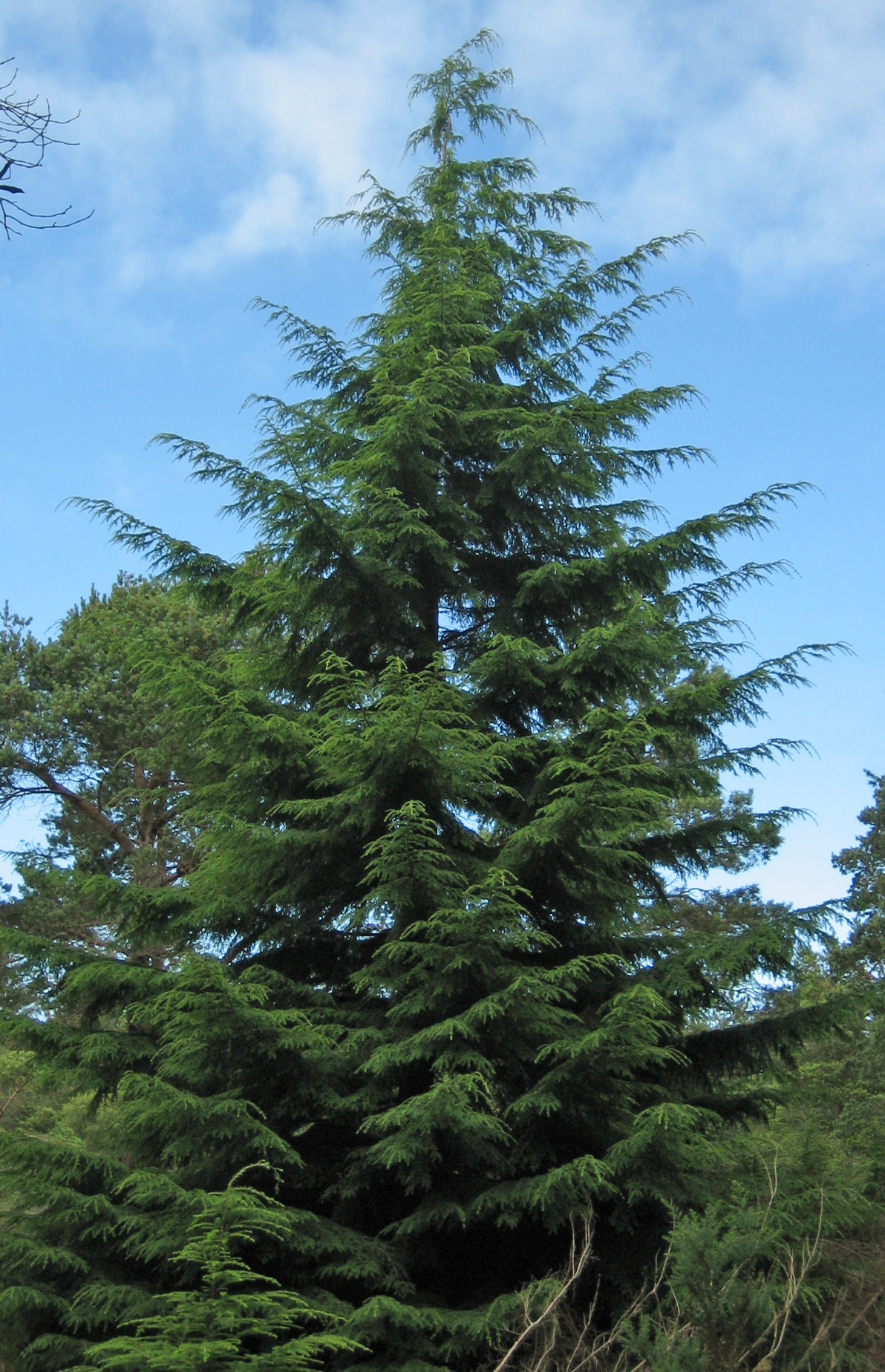
Young specimen

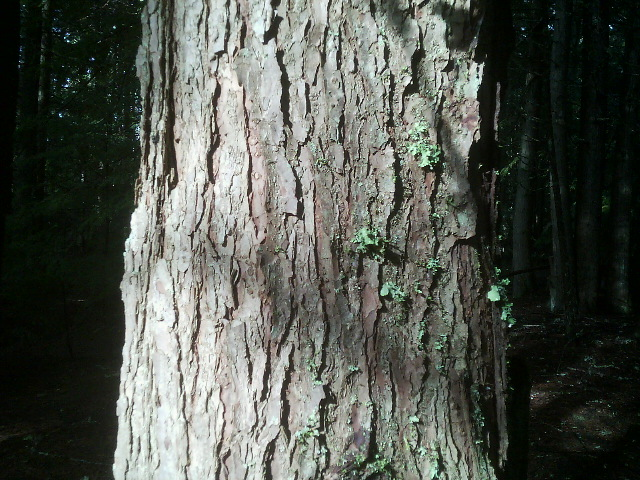
Bark

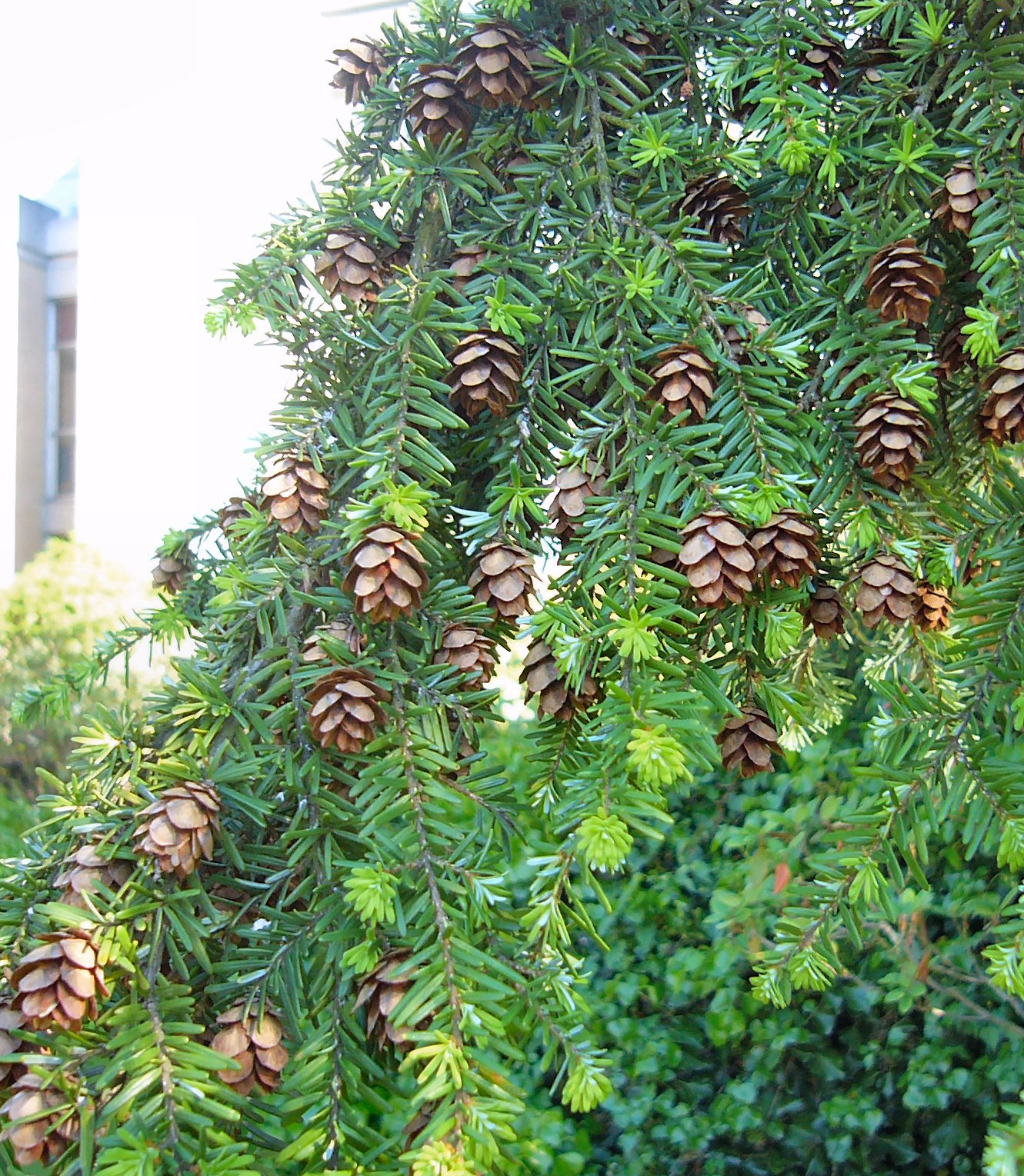
Mature cones (seeds released)

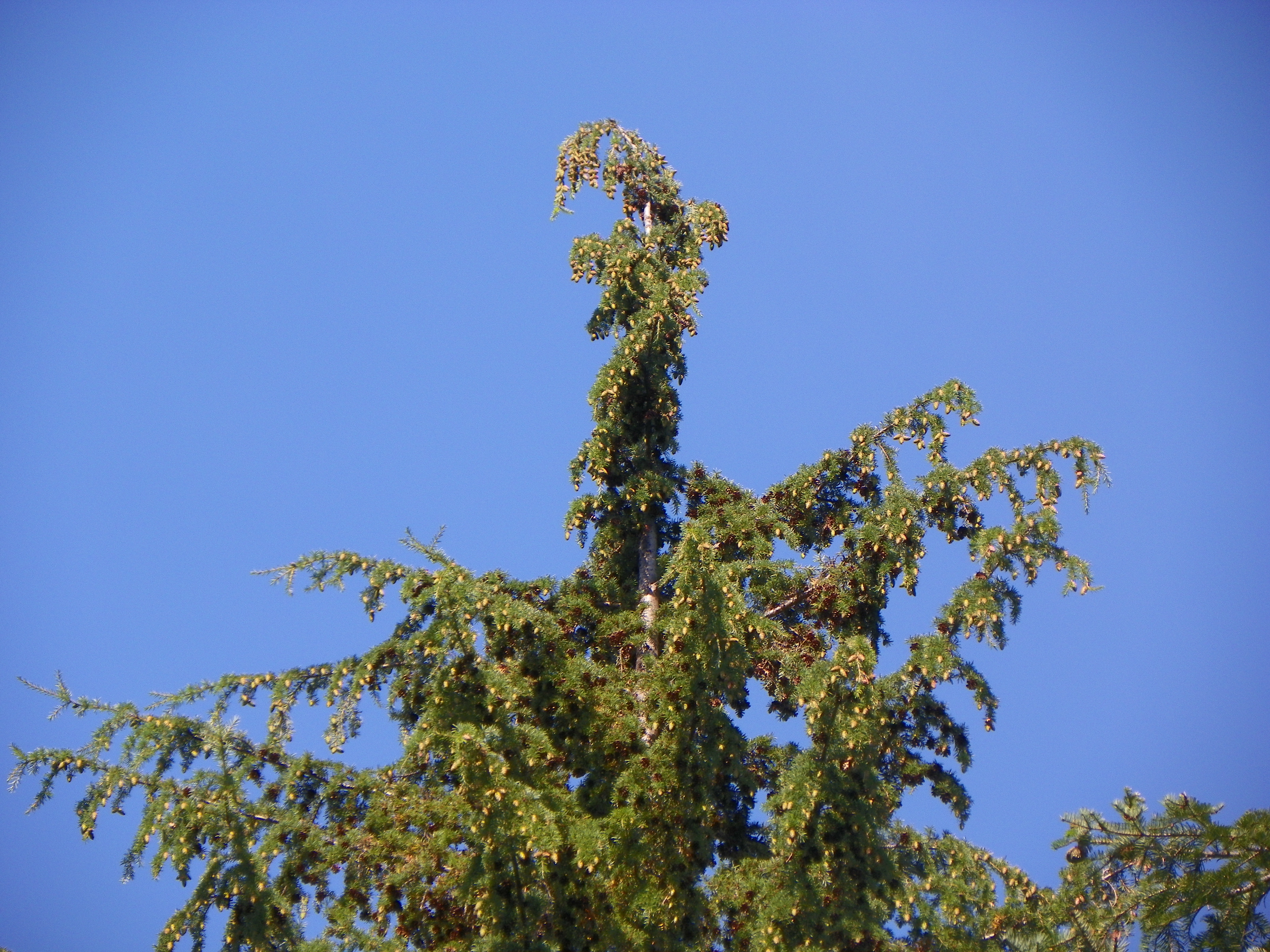
Tree top

== Etymology ==
The Latin heterophylla in the species name means 'variable leaved'.

== Distribution and habitat ==
Tsuga heterophylla is native to the northwest coast of North America, with its northwestern limit on the Kenai Peninsula, Alaska, and its southeastern limit in northern Sonoma County, California.

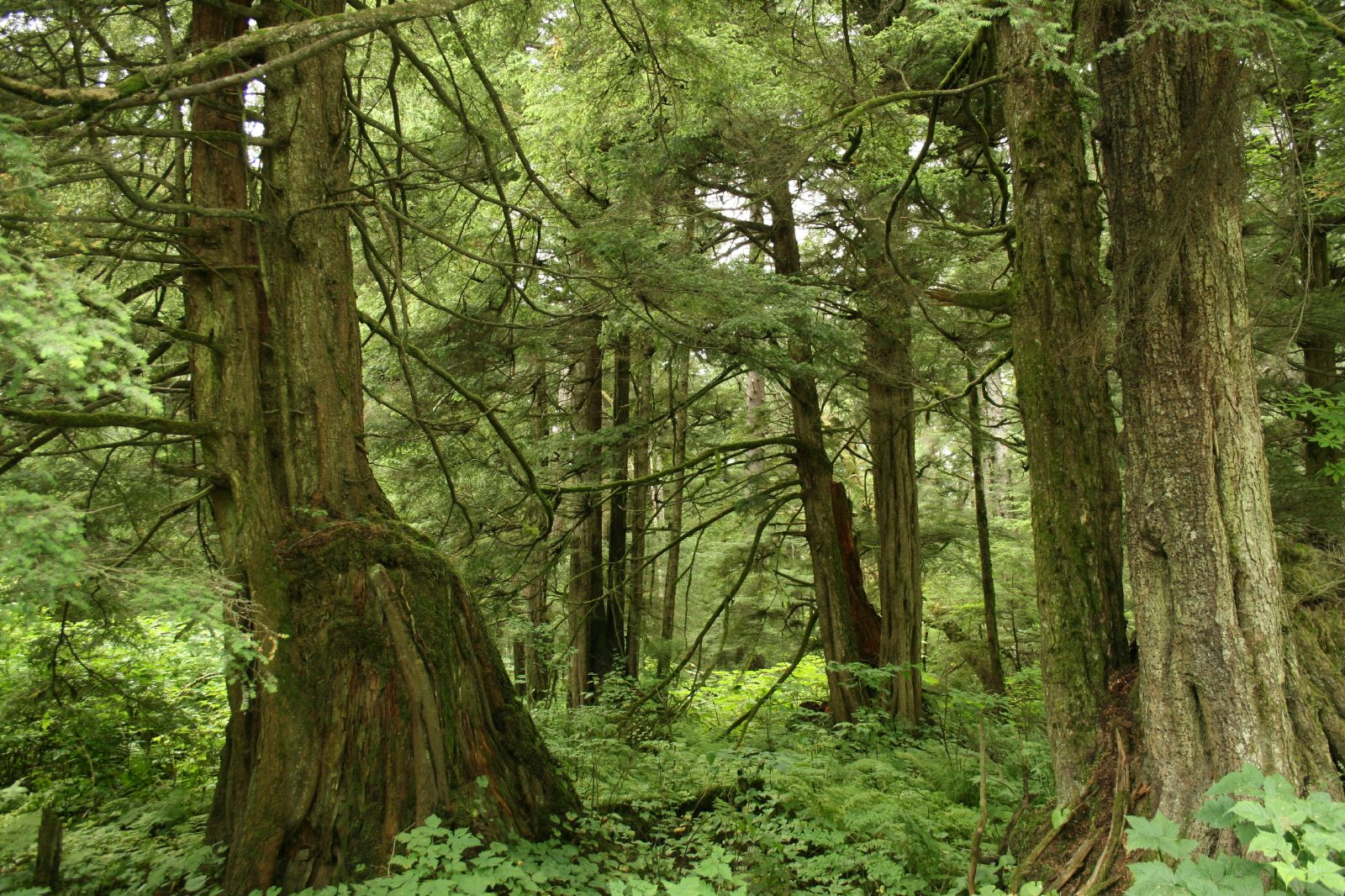
The species often grows on coarse woody debris such as nurse logs and cut stumps.

The species is an integral component of Pacific Northwest forests west of the Coast Ranges, where it is a climax species. It is also an important timber tree throughout the region, along with many of its large coniferous associates. The species is closely associated with temperate rainforests, and most of its range is less than 100 kilometres (62 miles) from the Pacific Ocean. Valleys it can be found in usually receive at least 80 cm (31 in) of rain annually. It mostly grows at low altitudes, from sea level to 600 m (2,000 ft). In western Washington, it can be found up to elevations of at least 3,500 ft (1,100 m). The species can also be found in humid areas of mountains further inland, where western white pine is normally dominant. For example, in the Columbia Mountains in and around southeastern British Columbia and northern Idaho, it grows up to 1,500 m (4,900 ft), particularly on north-facing slopes. In the interior part of its range in Idaho, it can be found up to 1,800 m (5,900 ft).

It has naturalised in some parts of Great Britain and New Zealand—not so extensively as to be considered an invasive species, but as an introduced one.

== Ecology ==
Western hemlock is a very shade-tolerant tree; among associated species in the Pacific Northwest, it is matched or exceeded in shade tolerance only by Pacific yew and Pacific silver fir. Young plants typically grow up under the canopy of other conifers such as Sitka spruce or Douglas-fir, where they can persist for decades waiting to exploit a gap in the canopy. They eventually replace these conifers, which are relatively shade intolerant, in climax forest. Storms and wildfires will create larger openings in the forest where these other species can then regenerate. Its thin bark and shallow roots makes Western hemlock susceptible to fire. At higher elevations, the species can be found mingling with mountain hemlock and seeming to take on some of its characteristics, although there is no conclusive evidence of hybridization.

Western hemlock forms ectomycorrhizal associations with some well-known edible fungi such as chanterelles (Cantharellus formosus, C. subalbidus, and Craterellus tubaeformis). It is capable of associating with wood-decay fungi in addition to soil fungi; this enables its seedlings to survive on rotting stumps and logs. Older forests are damaged by rot-causing fungi, dwarf mistletoe, and leaf-consuming insects such as Acleris gloverana and Lambdina fiscellaria.

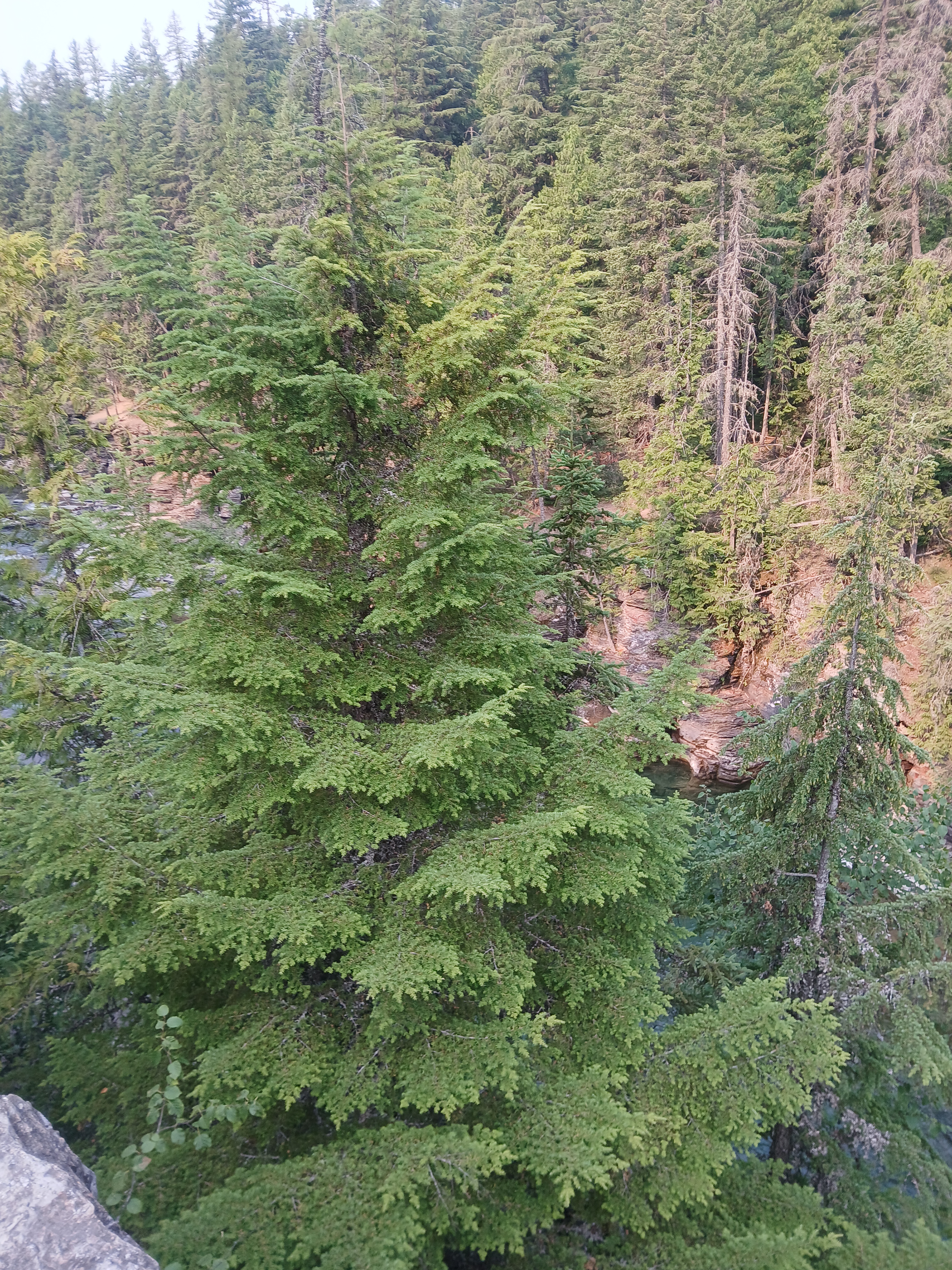
Western hemlock in Glacier National Park

== Cultivation ==
Western hemlock is cultivated as an ornamental tree in gardens in its native habitats and along the U.S. Pacific Coast, where its best reliability is seen in wetter regions. In relatively dry areas, as at Victoria, British Columbia, it is exacting about soil conditions. It needs a high level of organic matter (well-rotted wood from an old log or stump is best; animal manures may have too much nitrogen and salt), in a moist, acidic soil. It is also cultivated in temperate regions worldwide. It has gained the Royal Horticultural Society's Award of Garden Merit.

It can also be found in large gardens in northwest Europe and southern New Zealand.

== Uses ==
=== Food and medicine ===
The edible cambium can be collected by scraping slabs of removed bark. The resulting shavings can be eaten immediately, or can be dried and pressed into bread, as was done by the natives of Southeast Alaska. The inner bark was eaten by some Native American tribes as an emergency food, and the bark was cooked to make medicinal extracts for tuberculosis, rheumatic fever, and hemorrhage. The bark could also be boiled to make dark red dyes to make fishing nets and lines less visible to fish.

Western hemlocks have been submerged to collect herring eggs during the spring spawn in southeast Alaska. The boughs provide an easily collectible surface for the eggs to attach to as well as providing a distinctive taste. This practice originates from traditional gathering methods used by Native Alaskans from southeast Alaska, specifically the Tlingit people.

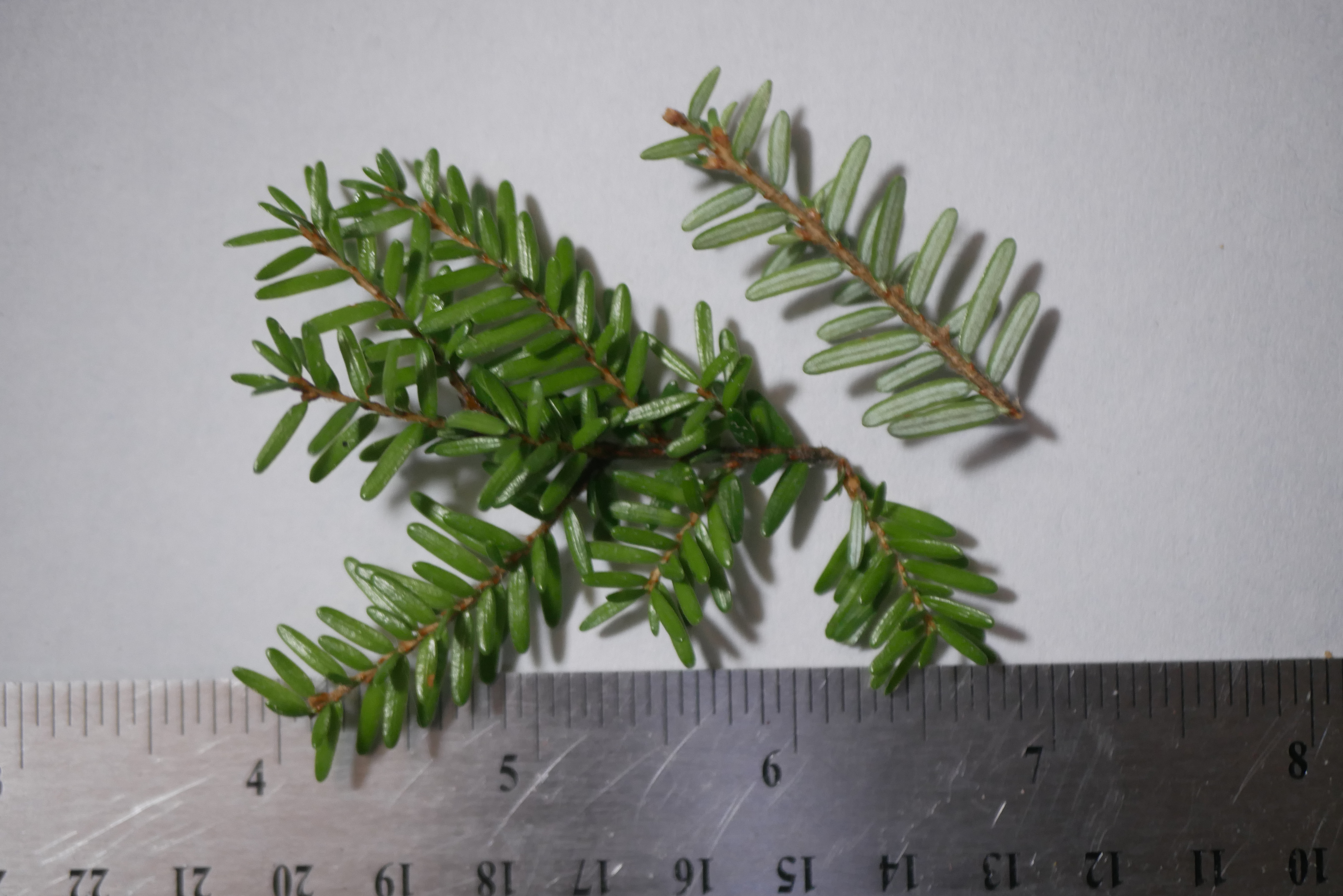
Young western hemlock needles suitable for brewing into tea.

Tender new-growth needles can be chewed directly or made into a tea with a clean, forest-like aroma, rich in vitamin C (similar to some other hemlock and pine species), has been used traditionally in the Northwest Coast.

=== Other uses ===
The bark has long served as a source of tannin for tanning leather.

When planted on the banks of a river, western hemlock can help reduce erosion. Outside of its natural range, the tree is of importance in forestry.

Until the early 1920s, the tree was largely ignored for use as lumber due to its presumed similarity to the poor-quality eastern hemlock. Since then, it has been greatly utilized for paper production and timber (as a softwood), used for making doors, joinery, and furniture. Its fiber is used to make rayon and various plastics.

== In culture ==
Western hemlock is the state tree of Washington.
