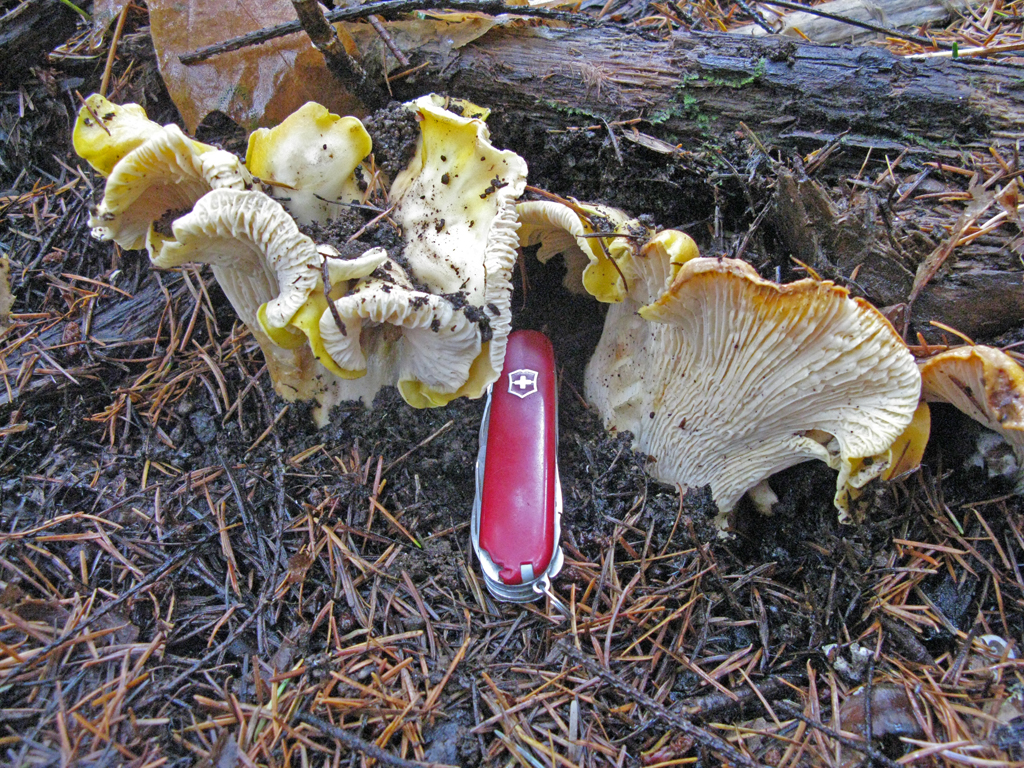

Scientific classification
- Domain: Eukaryota
- Kingdom: Fungi
- Division: Basidiomycota
- Class: Agaricomycetes
- Order: Cantharellales
- Family: Cantharellaceae
- Genus: Cantharellus
- Species: C. cascadensis

Binomial name
- Cantharellus cascadensis Dunham, O'Dell & R. Molina 2003

= Cantharellus cascadensis =

Species of fungus

Cantharellus cascadensis Mycological characteristics
- Ridges on hymenium
- Cap is infundibuliform
- Hymenium is decurrent
- Stipe is bare
- Spore print is white
- Ecology is mycorrhizal
- Edibility is choice

Cantharellus cascadensis, commonly known as the cascade chanterelle or hybrid chanterelle, is a fungus native to the Pacific Northwest region of North America. It is considered a choice edible mushroom.

== Taxonomy ==
Both Cantharellus cascadensis and C. roseocanus were first considered to be varieties of C. cibarius, then of C. formosus. C. cascadensis was genetically classified as its own species in 2003.

It is named after the Cascade Range, where it was formally described in 2003.

== Description ==
The cap is usually bright yellow with a smooth or wooly surface. The stipe is club-shaped to bulbous.

=== Similar species ===
Several other species of chanterelle may be found in western North America:

- C. californicus
- C. formosus
- C. roseocanus
- C. subalbidus

Additionally, Hygrophoropsis aurantiaca, Chroogomphus tomentosus, and species in the genera Craterellus, Gomphus, Omphalotus, and Polyozellus may have a somewhat similar appearance to C. cascadensis.
