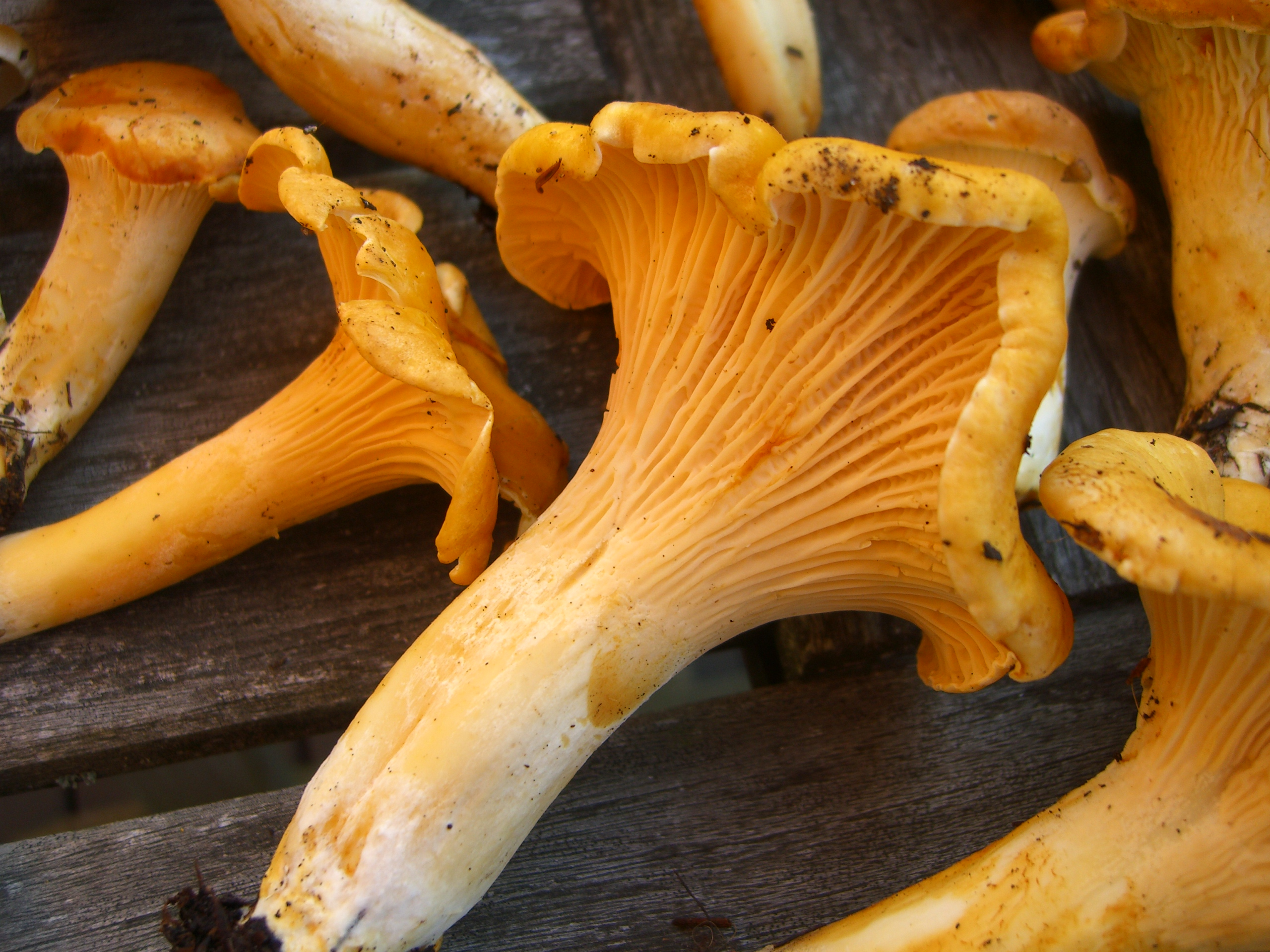

Scientific classification
- Kingdom: Fungi
- Division: Basidiomycota
- Class: Agaricomycetes
- Order: Cantharellales
- Family: Cantharellaceae
- Genus: Cantharellus
- Species: C. formosus

Binomial name
- Cantharellus formosus Corner (1966)

= Cantharellus formosus =

Species of fungus

Cantharellus formosus
- Mycological characteristics
- Ridges on hymenium
- Cap is infundibuliform
- Hymenium is decurrent
- Stipe is bare
- Spore print is yellow to white
- Ecology is mycorrhizal
- Edibility is choice

Cantharellus formosus, commonly known as the Pacific golden chanterelle, is a fungus native to the Pacific Northwest region of North America. It is a member of the genus Cantharellus along with other popular edible chanterelles. It was distinguished from C. cibarius in the 1990s. It is orange to yellow, meaty and funnel-shaped. On the underside of the smooth cap, it has gill-like ridges that run down onto its stipe, which tapers down from the cap. The false gills often have a pinkish hue. It has a mild, sweet odor.

It appears solitary to gregarious in coniferous forests, from July to December. It is a choice edible mushroom and Oregon's state mushroom.

== Taxonomy ==
E. J. H. Corner formally described C. formosus in 1966 from specimens collected on Vancouver Island in 1938. Despite this publication, the name C. cibarius (a European species) continued to be used to refer to golden chanterelles in the Pacific Northwest. In 1997, Redhead et al. re-examined Corner's specimens, returned to the type locale, and collected new specimens, confirming the identity of C. formosus. DNA analysis has since confirmed the species-level rank of C. formosus.

== Description ==
Fruiting bodies of C. formosus range from 2–15 cm (3/4–6 in) wide, with cap colors varying depending on light levels and weather. In dry weather, the cap is medium orange yellow to light yellow brown, but wet weather may brighten the cap to brilliant to soft orange yellow. In low light conditions, caps may not develop the yellow pigmentation, resulting in salmon to rosy buff colors. The false gills may be yellow, salmon, buff, or even whitish depending on conditions, but are usually paler than the cap. The stem is colored similarly to the cap, and is either equal-width or tapering downwards. The spore print is a yellowish white color.

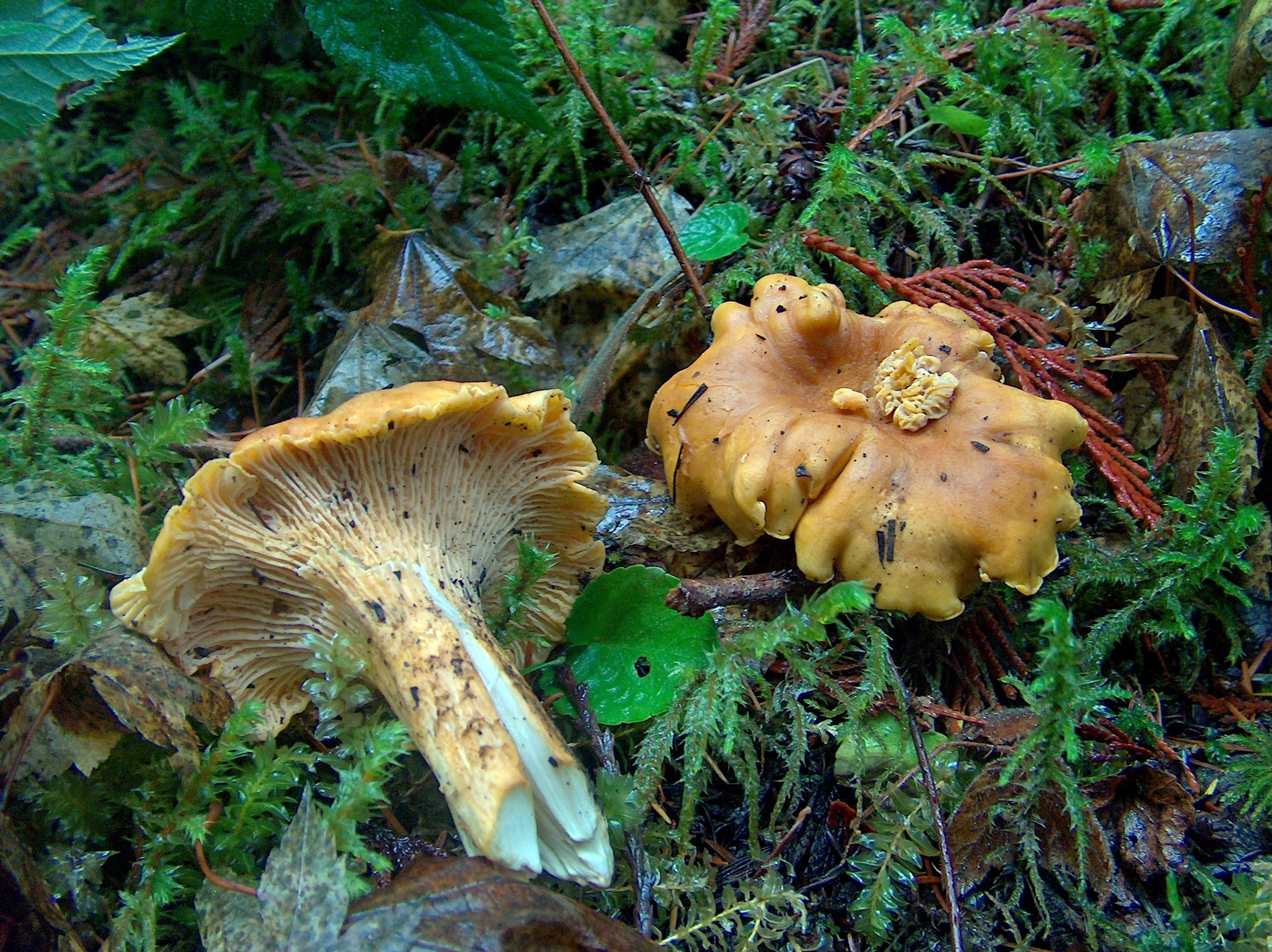
Yellow-brown specimens

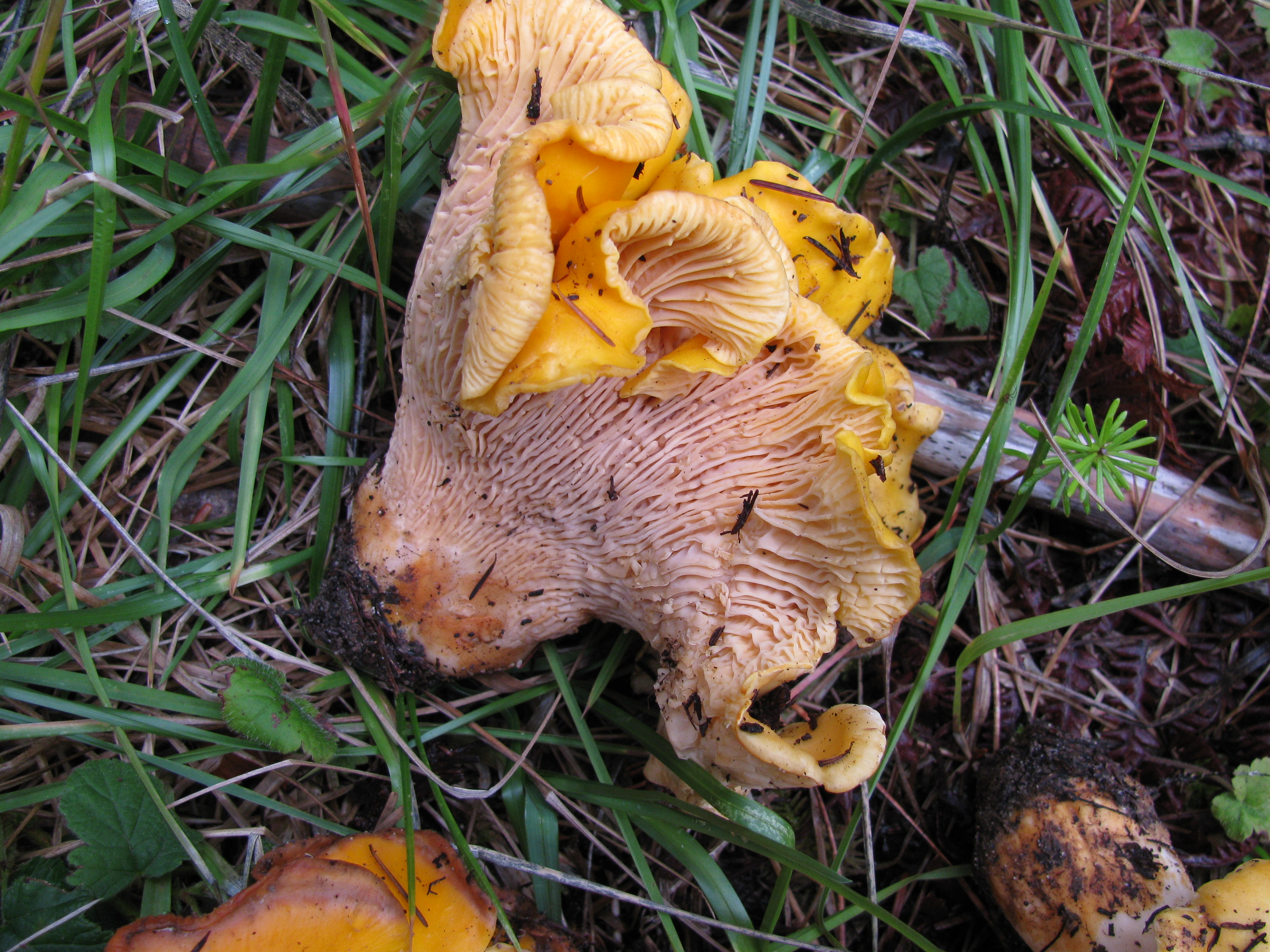
Pinkish hue on false gills

=== Similar species ===
Several other species of chanterelle may be found in western North America:

- C. californicus – large size, associated with oaks in California
- C. cascadensis – bright yellow fading to white in center of cap, may have bulbous base of stem
- C. cibarius var. roseocanus – brilliant orange-yellow color without pinkish hues, false gills not paler than cap
- C. subalbidus – whitish overall color, tend to grow larger and stouter than C. formosus

Additionally, Hygrophoropsis aurantiaca, Chroogomphus tomentosus, and species in the genera Craterellus, Gomphus (namely G. kauffmanii), Turbinellus (particularly Turbinellus floccosus, previously known as Gomphus floccosus, which shares the chanterelle's veiny folds but not its edibility), Omphalotus (particularly the poisonous O. olivascens in California), and Polyozellus may have a somewhat similar appearance to C. formosus.

== Distribution and habitat ==
Cantharellus formosus has been reported from British Columbia to California, and is particularly abundant in the conifer forests of Washington and Oregon. It forms a mycorrhizal association with Douglas-fir and western hemlock, and has been shown to be more common in younger (40- to 60-year-old) forests than in old-growth forests. It grows solitary to gregarious, from July to December.

== Uses ==
The mushroom has a mildly sweet odor and a mild taste. It should be brushed clean but not washed before cooking. It can be tossed, stir-fried, and sautéed in butter or oil. Commonly sold in grocery markets and restaurants, it is the most important commercially harvested Cantharellus species in the Pacific Northwest.

== In culture ==
The species has been designated Oregon's state mushroom due to its economic value and abundance.
