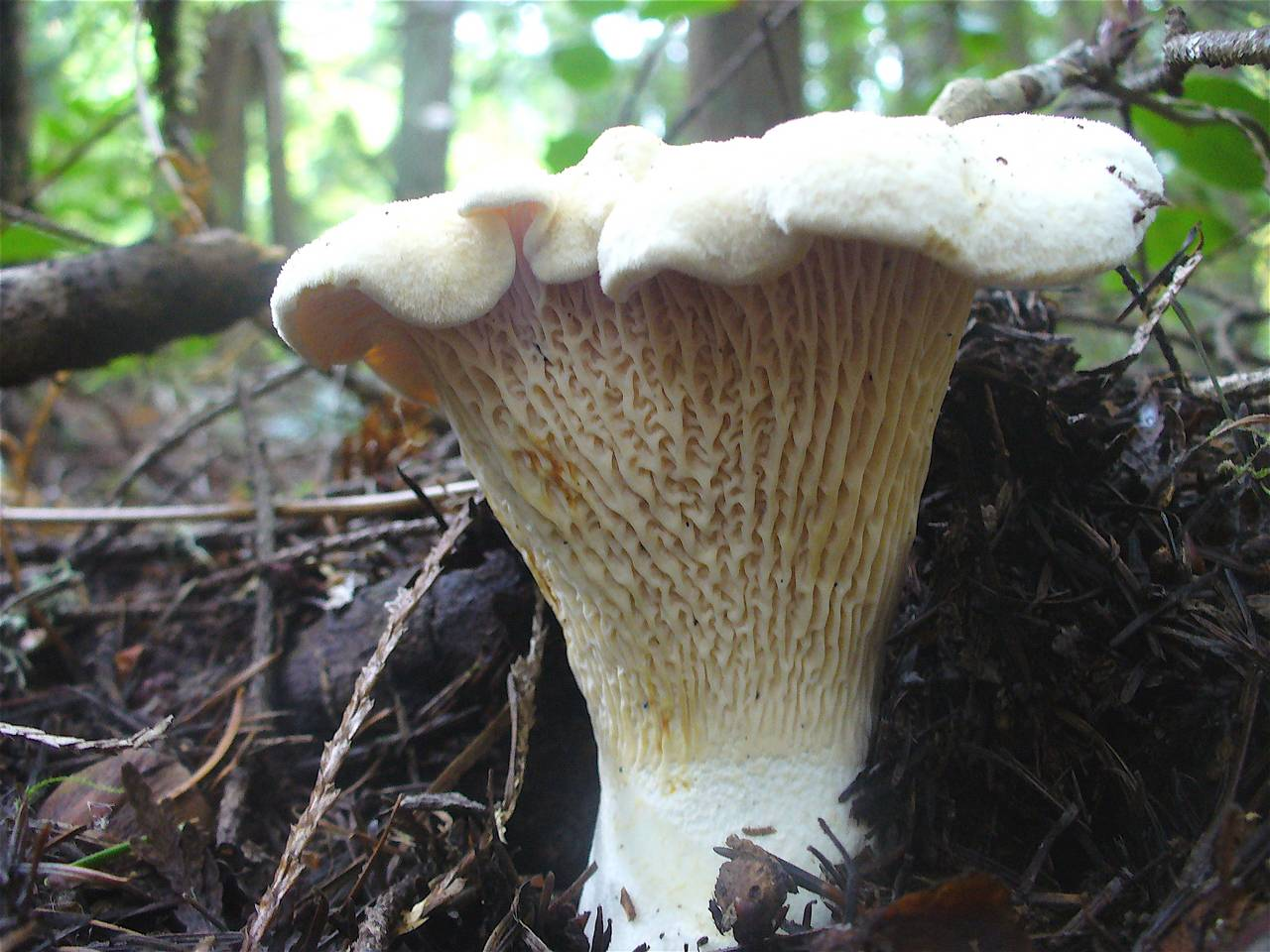

Scientific classification
- Kingdom: Fungi
- Division: Basidiomycota
- Class: Agaricomycetes
- Order: Cantharellales
- Family: Cantharellaceae
- Genus: Cantharellus
- Species: C. subalbidus

Binomial name
- Cantharellus subalbidus A.H.Sm. & Morse (1947)

= Cantharellus subalbidus =

Species of fungus

Cantharellus subalbidus Mycological characteristics
- Ridges on hymenium
- Cap is infundibuliform
- Hymenium is decurrent
- Stipe is bare
- Spore print is white
- Ecology is mycorrhizal
- Edibility is choice

Cantharellus subalbidus, the white chanterelle, is a species of fungus native to western North America. It is a member of the genus Cantharellus along with other popular edible chanterelles.

== Description ==
The mushroom is white to cream in color, later darkening to yellow-orange. The cap is 4–15 centimetres (1.5–6 in) wide, flat to depressed, becoming infundibuliform (vaselike) with age. The stalk is 2–7 cm (3/4–2 3/4 in) tall and 1–5 cm wide, tapered, with yellow-brown spots due to bruising and age. The spores are white, elliptical, and smooth.

It is similar in appearance to other chanterelles except for its cream to white color and orange bruising.

=== Similar species ===
Several other species of chanterelle may be found in western North America:

- C. californicus
- C. cascadensis
- C. cibarius var. roseocanus
- C. formosus

Additionally, Leucopaxillus albissimus, Hygrophoropsis aurantiaca, Chroogomphus tomentosus, and species in the genera Clitocybe, Craterellus, Gomphus, Omphalotus, and Polyozellus may have a somewhat similar appearance.

== Distribution and habitat ==
C. subalbidus is native to California and the Pacific Northwest region of North America. In the latter, it can be found from August to October.

The fungus has been found to be more common in old-growth forests than in younger forests.

== Ecology ==
Cantharellus subalbidus may form a mycorrhizal association with species of pine, hemlock, Douglas-fir, and Pacific madrone.

== Uses ==
A choice edible mushroom, it can be prepared by being sautéed or cutting into chunks and baking at 350 °F (177 °C) for 10 minutes.
