= Bruno Cetto =

Italian engineer and mycologist (1921–1991)

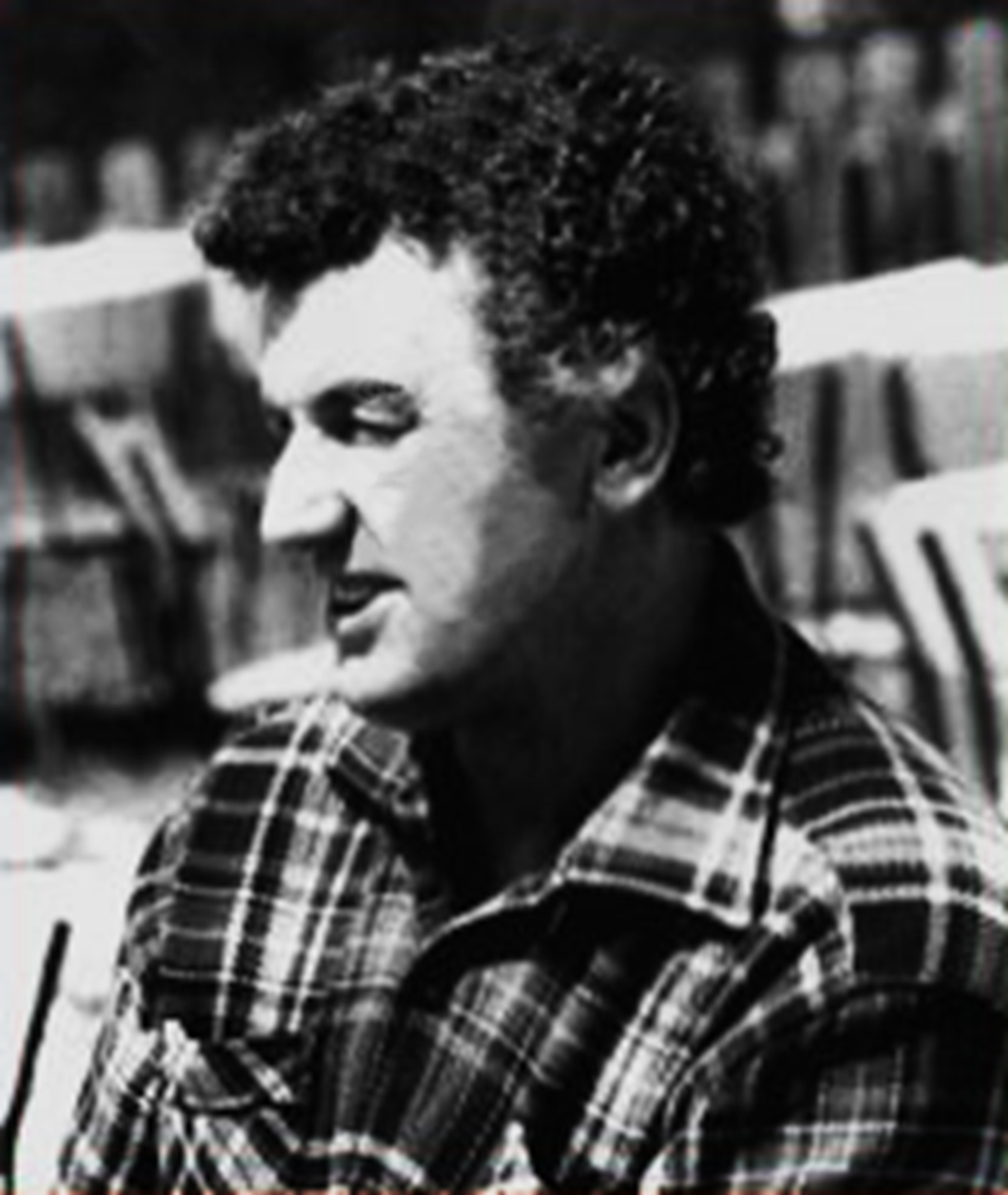
- Born: April 21, 1921
- Died: July 16, 1991 (aged 70)
- Notable work: I funghi dal vero

Bruno Cetto (1921–1991), born in Trento, Italy, was an Italian engineer and mycologist. He is noted for writing a seminal, seven-volume series of books on mushrooms in Italian, I Funghi dal Vero.

== Legacy ==
Several Italian mycological events have been named after him, including a mycological Italian association/club. His hometown named a street after him.

== Biography ==
Born in Trento in 1921, Bruno was the penultimate of the five children of Adolfo Cetto (1873–1963), a distinguished professor of literature and Latin at the Istituto G. Prati of Trent, a highly cultured personality with a wealth of interests and contacts with the entire world of the Trentino intelligentsia, founder and president of the journal Studi Trentini di scienze Storiche, and author of multiple articles also in the journal Studi Trentini di Scienze Naturali.

Bruno received from his father a deep passion for culture and knowledge and, having completed his high school studies in Trent, he undertook engineering studies, which he had to interrupt due to World War II, to resume and graduate from the University of Padua in Mechanical Engineering, with a thesis on funiculars and cable cars.

After graduation, he followed in his father's footsteps in his teaching career as professor of Mechanical Technology at the M. Buonarroti Industrial Technical Institute (ITI) in Trento until becoming its principal in 1986.

In addition to his profession as a teacher, he has for many years been a professional surveyor, as well as a semi-professional, but performed at a high level, expert in photography, particularly macrophotography.
