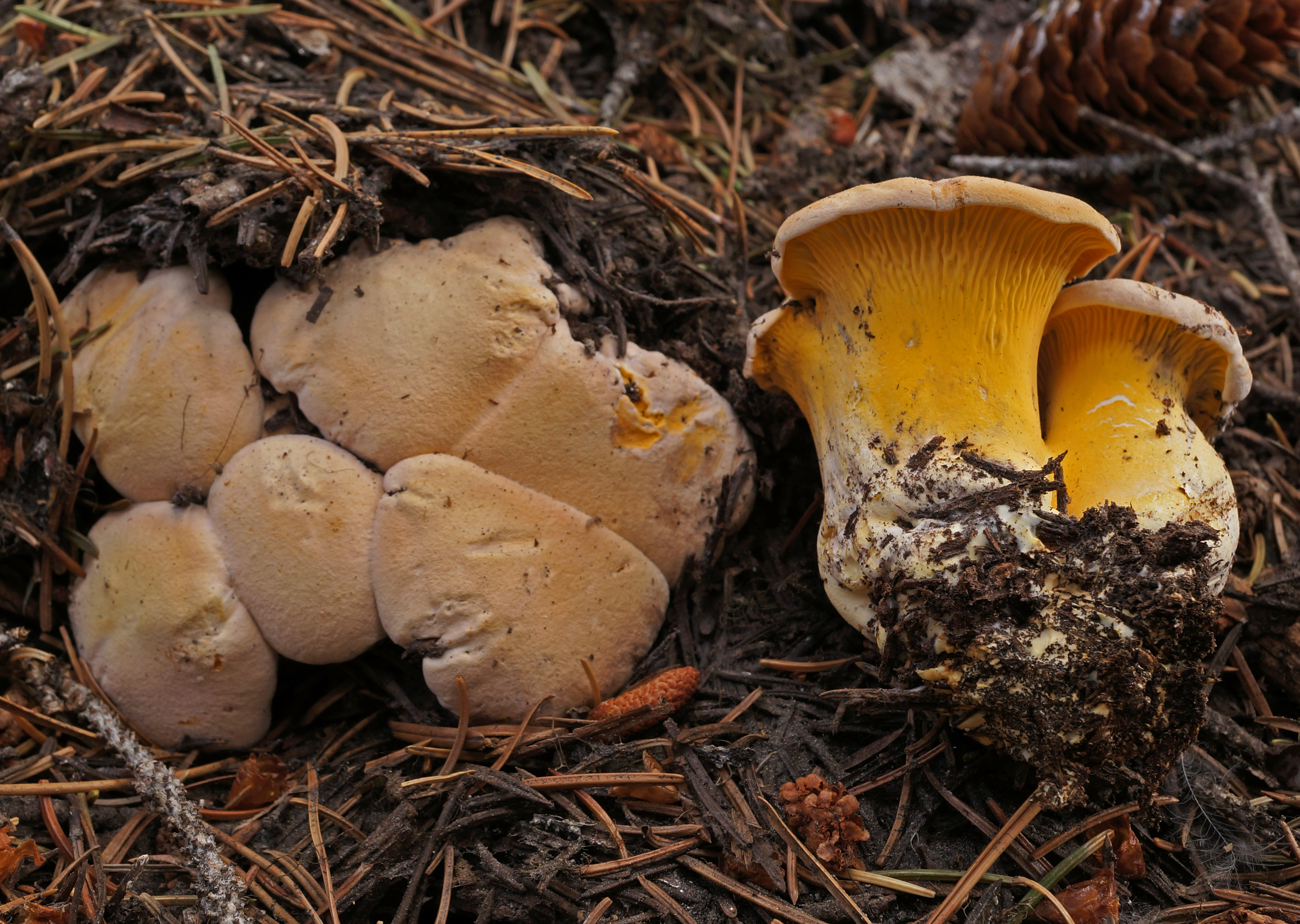

Scientific classification
- Kingdom: Fungi
- Division: Basidiomycota
- Class: Agaricomycetes
- Order: Cantharellales
- Family: Cantharellaceae
- Genus: Cantharellus
- Species: C. roseocanus

Binomial name
- Cantharellus roseocanus (Redhead, Norvell & Danell) Redhead, Norvell & Moncalvo (2012)

Synonyms
- Cantharellus cibarius var. roseocanus Redhead, Norvell & Danell (1997)

= Cantharellus roseocanus =

Species of fungus

Cantharellus roseocanus, commonly known as the rainbow chanterelle, is a species of fungus in the family Cantharellaceae. Found in the Pacific Northwest region of North America, it was originally described in 1997 as a variety of Cantharellus cibarius, and later promoted to distinct species status in 2012.

== Taxonomy ==
Cantharellus roseocanus was first described in 1997 by Scott A. Redhead as a variety of Cantharellus cibarius. In 2012, it became its own species.

== Description ==
The cap of Cantharellus roseocanus are about 1-4 inches (3-10 centimeters) across, and the stipe is about 1.5-4 inches (4-10 centimeters) long. The cap is orange with a pink margin when wet and young. The ridges are bright peachy/apricot orange when young, becoming bright yellow-orange as the mushroom ages.
