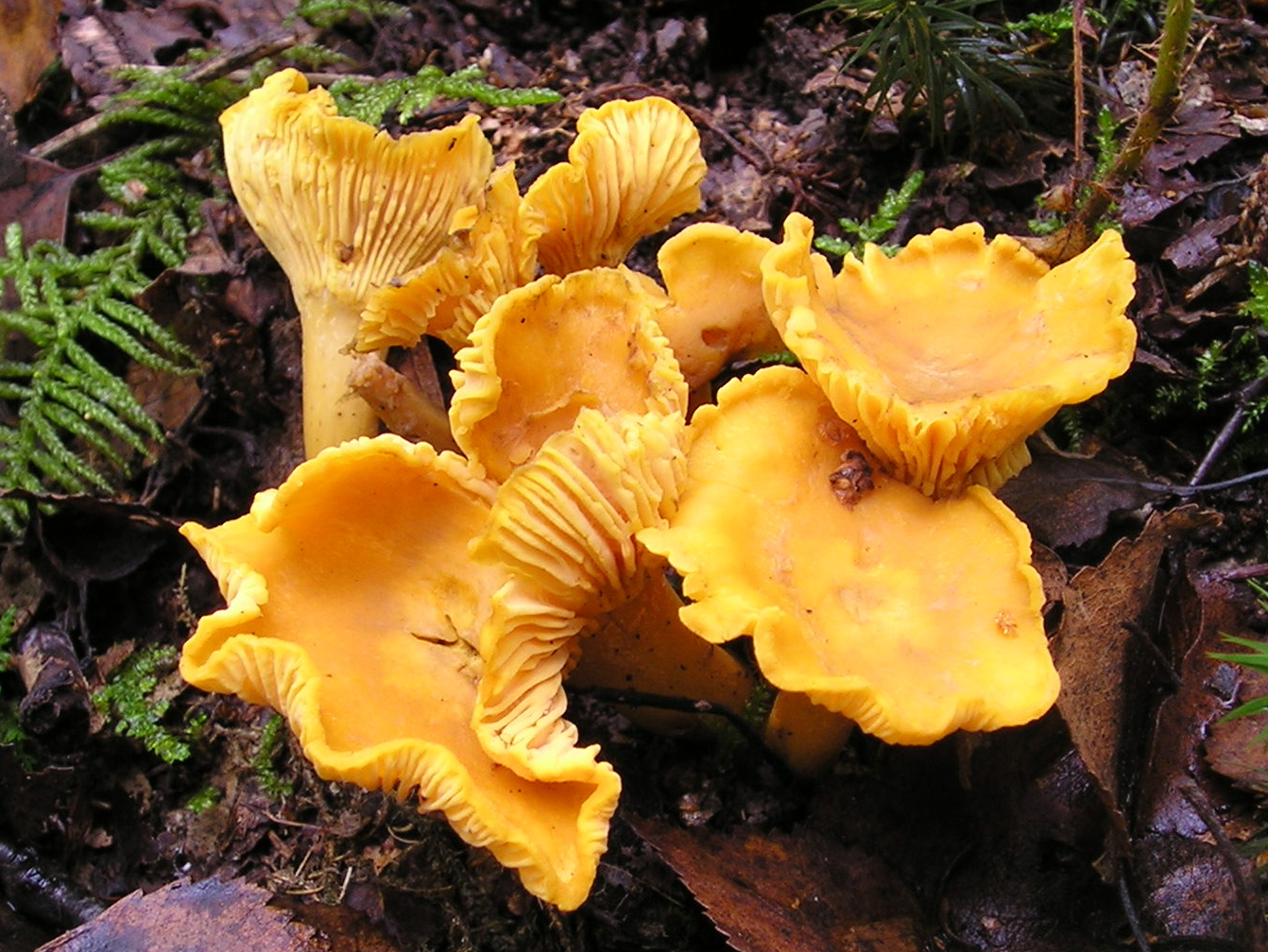

Scientific classification
- Kingdom: Fungi
- Division: Basidiomycota
- Class: Agaricomycetes
- Order: Cantharellales
- Family: Cantharellaceae
- Genus: Cantharellus
- Species: C. cibarius

Binomial name
- Cantharellus cibarius Fr. (1821)

Synonyms
- Species synonymy: Agaricus cantharellus L. (1753); Merulius cantharellus (L.) Scop. (1772); Cantharellus vulgaris Gray (1821); Merulius cibarius (Fr.) Westend. (1857); Cantharellus rufipes Gillet (1878); Cantharellus cibarius var. amethysteus Quél. (1883); Cantharellus cibarius var. rufipes (Gillet) Cooke (1883); Cantharellus amethysteus (Quél.) Sacc. (1887); Craterellus amethysteus (Quél.) Quél. (1888); Craterellus cibarius (Fr.) Quél. (1888); Merulius amethysteus (Quél.) Kuntze (1891); Alectorolophoides cibarius (Fr.) Earle (1909); Chanterel cantharellus (L.) Murrill (1910); Cantharellus edulis Sacc. (1916); Cantharellus pallens Pilát (1959); Cantharellus cibarius var. amethysteus (Quél.) Cetto (1987)

= Cantharellus cibarius =

Species of fungus

Cantharellus cibarius
- Mycological characteristics
- Ridges on hymenium
- Cap is infundibuliform
- Hymenium is decurrent
- Stipe is bare
- Spore print is yellow to cream
- Ecology is mycorrhizal
- Edibility is choice

Cantharellus cibarius (Latin: cantharellus, "chanterelle"; cibarius, "culinary") is the golden chanterelle, the type species of the chanterelle genus Cantharellus. It is also known as girolle (or girole).

Despite its characteristic features, C. cibarius can be confused with species such as the poisonous Omphalotus illudens. The golden chanterelle is a commonly consumed and choice edible species.

== Taxonomy ==
At one time, all yellow or golden chanterelles in North America had been classified as Cantharellus cibarius. Using DNA analysis, they have since been shown to be a group of related species known as the Cantharellus cibarius group or species complex, with C. cibarius sensu stricto restricted to Europe. In 1997, C. formosus (the Pacific golden chanterelle) and C. cibarius var. roseocanus were identified, followed by C. cascadensis in 2003 and C. californicus in 2008. In 2018, C. anzutake was identified, found in Japan and Korea.

== Description ==
The mushroom is easy to detect and recognize in nature. The body is 3–15 centimetres (1–6 inches) wide and 5–10 cm (2–4 in) tall. The color varies from yellow to dark yellow. Red spots will appear on the cap of the mushroom if it is damaged. Chanterelles have a faint aroma and flavor of apricots. The spore print is yellowish.

=== Similar species ===
Cantharellus cibarius can resemble species such as the dangerously poisonous Omphalotus illudens (eastern jack-o'lantern) and Hygrophoropsis aurantiaca (the false chanterelle).

== Distribution and habitat ==
The species grows in Europe from Scandinavia to the Mediterranean Basin, mainly in deciduous and coniferous forests and typically from June to December.

== Uses ==
A commonly eaten and favored mushroom, the chanterelle is typically harvested from late summer to late fall in its European distribution.

Chanterelles are used in many culinary dishes, but watery specimens are more susceptible to rot. The mushrooms can be preserved by either drying or freezing. The use of an oven for drying is not recommended because it can make the mushroom bitter.
