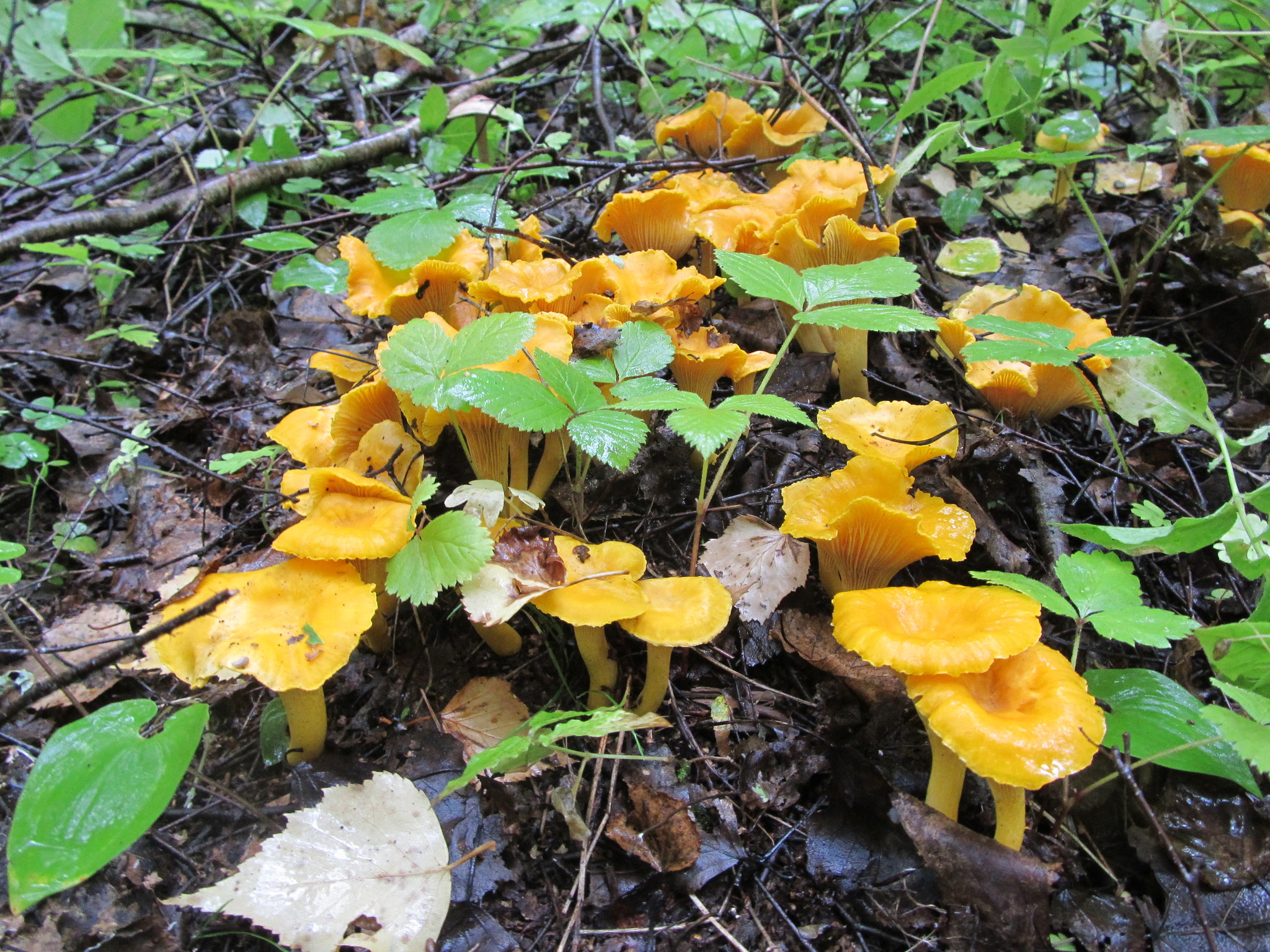

Scientific classification
- Kingdom: Fungi
- Division: Basidiomycota
- Class: Agaricomycetes
- Order: Cantharellales
- Family: Cantharellaceae
- Genus: Cantharellus
- Subgenus: Cantharellus subg. Cantharellus; Buyck & V. Hofstetter (2014)

Type species
- Cantharellus cibarius Fr. (1821)

Species
- See text

= Cantharellus subg. Cantharellus =

Subgenus of fungi

Cantharellus subg. Cantharellus
- Mycological characteristics
- Gills on hymenium
- Cap is convex
- Edibility is edible

Cantharellus is a subgenus of fungi in the genus Cantharellus.

== Description ==
This subgenus has medium to large fruiting bodies with a veined hymenophore. The cap and stipes are usually smooth, sometimes with appressed squama. The hyphal endings are mostly thick-walled.

== Taxonomy ==
The subgenus was established in 2013 based on phylogenetic analysis, with Cantharellus cibarius designated as the type species.

=== Species ===
Accepted species:

Image	Name	Year	Mycorrhizal association	Distribution
	C. albopileatus N.K. Zeng, Y.Z. Zhang, and W.F. Lin	2022	Castanopsis fissa	China(Zhejiang)
	C. alborufescens (Malençon) Papetti & S. Alberti	1998	Quercus ilex, Quercus pubescens	Spain, Iran, France, Croatia, Austria, Slovakia
	C. altipes Buyck & V.Hofst.	2011		southeastern United States
	C. amethysteus (Quél.) Sacc.	1887	oaks, beeches or birches	Europe
	C. applanatus D. Kumari, Ram. Upadhyay & Mod.S. Reddy	2013	Pinus densiflora, Carpinus laxiflora, Quercus mongolica	India, China, Japan, Korea
	— C. natarajanii Deepika, Ram. Upadhyay & Mod.S. Reddy (2013) is a synonym.			
	— C. anzutake W. Ogawa, N. Endo, M. Fukuda & A. Yamada (2017) is a synonym.			
	C. californicus Arora & Dunham - the oak chanterelle	2008	Quercus agrifolia, Quercus kelloggii, Quercus chrysolepis, Quercus wislizeni, Arbutus menziesii	California
	C. camphoratus R.H. Petersen	1979		Canada, United States
	C. cascadensis Dunham, O'Dell & R. Molina	2003	Pseudotsuga menziesii, Tsuga heterophylla	the Pacific Northwest of North America
	C. chicagoensis Leacock, J. Riddell, Rui Zhang & G.M. Muell.	2016	Quercus alba, Quercus rubra	Chicago, United States
	C. chuiweifanii N.K. Zeng, Y.Z. Zhang, and Zhi Q. Liang	2022	Lithocarpus	China(Hainan)
	C. cibarius Fr. golden chanterelle	1821		Europe, China (Northeastern), Japan
	C. confluens (Berk. & M.A. Curtis) R.H. Petersen	1980		southern Appalachians, southeastern United States, and Mexico
	C. deceptivus Buyck, Justice & V. Hofst.	2016		Eastern United States
	C. eccentricus Buyck, V. Hofst. & Eyssart.	2014		New Caledonia
	C. elongatipes D. Kumari, Ram. Upadhyay & Mod.S. Reddy	2014		India
	C. enelensis Voitk, Thorn, Lebeuf, J.I. Kim	2017		Newfoundland, Quebec, Michigan and Illinois
	C. ferruginascens Cantharellus ferruginascens P.D. Orton	1969		Greece, Slovakia, Iran
	C. flavolateritius Buyck & V. Hofst.	2016		United States
	C. flavus M.J. Foltz & T.J.Volk	2013		midwestern and southern United States
	C. hainanensis N.K. Zeng, Zhi Q. Liang & S. Jiang	2017	Lithocarpus	China(Hainan)
	C. incrassatus Buyck & V. Hofst.	2014	Quercus leucotrichophora	Malaysia
	C. indicus D. Kumari, Ram. Upadhyay & Mod.S. Reddy	2014	Quercus leucotrichophora	India
	C. iuventateviridis Buyck, Looney, Harsch & V. Hofst	2016	Carpinus caroliniana, Quercus nigra	United States
	C. laevihymeninus T. Cao & H.S. Yuan	2021		China(Yunnan)
	C. lateritius (Berk.) Singer - the smooth chanterelle	1951	hardwood	North America(Michigan to New England.), Africa, Malaysia, and the Himalayas (Uttar Pradesh)
	C. lewisii Buyck & V. Hofst.	2011	hardwoods	southeastern United States
	C. macrocarpus N. K. Zeng, Y. Z. Zhang & Zhi Q. Liang	2021		China (Hainan)
	C. nothofagorum G.M. Muell. & R.H. Petersen	1992	Nothofagus dombeyi	Argentina
	C. phasmatis Foltz & T.J.Volk	2013		United States
	C. pallens Pilát	1959		Czech Republic, Bohemia, Spain
	C. persicinus R.H. Petersen	1986		Eastern United States
	C. pinetorus N.K. Zeng, Y.Z. Zhang and Zhi Q. Liang	2022	Pinus massoniana	China (Hunan)
	C. pseudoformosus Deepika, Upadhyay & Reddy	2011	Cedrus deodara	India
	C. quercophilus Buyck, D.P. Lewis, Eyssart. & V. Hofstetter	2010	Quercus stellata	southeastern United States
	C. ravus N.K. Zeng, Y.Z. Zhang and Zhi Q. Liang	2022	Lithocarpus	China (Hunan)
	C. roseocanus (Redhead, Norvell & Danell) Redhead, Norvell & Moncalvo	2012	Pinus contorta, Pinus banksiana, Pinus muricata	Pacific Northwest region of North America
	C. roseofagetorum I. Olariaga, G. Moreno, J.L. Manjon, I. Salcedo, V. Hofstetter, D. Rodríguez & B. Buyck	2016	Fagus orientalis	Georgia
	C. septentrionalis C. A.H. Sm.	1968		United States (Michigan)
	C. spectaculus Foltz & T.J.Volk - the spectacular chanterelle,	2013		midwestern United States
	C. subalbidus A.H.Sm. & Morse	1947	Pseudotsuga menziesii, Tsuga heterophylla, Arbutus menziesii	western North America
	C. subamethysteus Eyssart. & Stubbe	2009		Malaysia
	C. subpruinosus Eyssart. & Buyck	2000		Europe
	C. subvaginatus Buyck, Antonín & V. Hofst.	2018	Quercus mongolica, Abies holophylla	South Korea
	C. tenuithrix Buyck & V. Hofstetter	2011	Quercus alba	southeastern United States
	C. vaginatus S.C. Shao, X.F. Tian & P.G. Liu	2011		China, India (Sikkim)
	C. velutinus Buyck & V. Hofst.	2016		United States
	C. veraecrucis Bandala, Montoya & M. Herrera	2021	Quercus oleoides	Mexico (Veracruz)
	C. versicolor S.C. Shao & P.G. Liu	2016		China(Yunnan)
	C. violaceovinosus M. Herrera, Bandala & Montoya	2018	Quercus oleoides, Quercus glaucescens, Quercus sapotifolia	Mexico (Veracruz)

=== Reclassified species ===
- C. yunnanensis W.F. Chiu (1973) – the Cantharellus species that is commonly sold in bulk in Southwest China, once denoted as C. yunnanensis, is C. applanatus; the C. yunnanensis per se is reclassified as Craterellus yunnanensis (W.F. Chiu) Buyck (2023).
