= List of books about mushrooms =

This is a list of published books about mushrooms and mycology, including their history in relation to man, their identification, their usage as food and medicine, and their ecology.

== Identification guides ==
These are larger works that may be hard to take on a hike but help with in depth identification after mushroom hunting.

- Kuo, Michael (2005). Morels. Ann Arbor: University of Michigan Press. ISBN 978-0472030361.
- Pacioni, Giovanni (1981). Simon and Schuster's Guide to Mushrooms. New York: Simon and Schuster. ISBN 978-0671428495.
- Stamets, Paul (1978). Psilocybe Mushrooms & Their Allies. Seattle Berkeley, Calif: Homestead Book Co. Distributed nationally by And/Or Press. ISBN 0-930180-03-8.
- Stamets, Paul (1996). Psilocybin Mushrooms of the World: An Identification Guide. Berkeley, Calif: Ten Speed Press. ISBN 0-89815-839-7.

=== Europe ===
These are identification guides relevant only to Europe.

- Bondartsev, A.S. (1971). The Polyporaceae of the European USSR and Caucasia. Jerusalem, Israel: Program for Scientific Translations. OCLC 204648.
- Breitenbach, J (1984). Fungi of Switzerland. Mad River Press. ISBN 978-0916422479.
- Kavina, Karel (1934). Atlas des Champignons de l'Europe (in French). Praha: Chez les éditeurs. OCLC 3065296.
- Lange, Jakob (1983). Guide des Champignons (in French). Neuchâtel: Delachaux et Niestle. ISBN 9782603004692.
- Lange, Morten (1967). Notes on the Macromycetes of Northern Norway (Acta Borealia, A. Scientia No. 23). Tromsø, Oslo: Universitetsforlaget.
- Skirgiełło, Alina (1975). Fungi: Basidiomycetes, Boletales (Gryzyby). Warsaw, Poland: The Foreign Scientific Publications Dept. of the National Center for Scientific, Technical and Economic Information. OCLC 3073155.
- Sterry, Paul (1991). Fungi of Britain and Northern Europe. London: Chancellor. ISBN 978-1851528103.
- Buczacki, Stefan (2012). Collins Fungi Guide. HarperCollins. ISBN 9780007466481.
- Thompson, Peter (2013). Ascomycetes in Colour: Found and Photographed in Mainland Britain. Great Britain: Xlibris Corporation. ISBN 978-1479747559.

=== North America ===
These are identification guides relevant only to North America. Below are sections detailing specific regions of North America, such as the Southeastern United States and the Pacific Northwest.

- Bessette, Alan (2016). Boletes of Eastern North America. Syracuse, New York: Syracuse University Press. ISBN 978-0815610748.
- Bessette, Alan (2009). Milk Mushrooms of North America: A Field Identification Guide to the Genus Lactarius. Syracuse, N.Y: Syracuse University Press. ISBN 978-0815632290.
- Bessette, Alan (2010). North American Boletes: A Color Guide to the Fleshy Pored Mushrooms. Syracuse: Syracuse University Press. ISBN 978-0815632443.
- Bessette, Alan (2013). Tricholomas of North America: A Mushroom Field Guide. Austin: University of Texas Press. ISBN 9780292742345.
- Bessette, Alan (2012). Waxcap Mushrooms of Eastern North America. Syracuse, N.Y: Syracuse University Press. ISBN 978-0815632689.
- Beug, Michael (2014). Ascomycete Fungi of North America: A Mushroom Reference Guide. Austin: University of Texas Press. ISBN 978-0292742338.
- Kerrigan, Richard (2016). Agaricus of North America. Bronx, New York, USA: New York Botanical Garden. ISBN 978-0-89327-536-5.
- Miller, Orson (2006). North American Mushrooms: A Field Guide to Edible and Inedible Fungi. Guilford, Conn: Falcon Guide. ISBN 9780762731091.
- Phillips, Roger (2005). Mushrooms & Other Fungi of North America. Buffalo, NY: Firefly Books. ISBN 9781554071159.

==== Alaska ====
- Laursen, Gary (2009). Common Interior Alaska Cryptogams: Fungi, Lichenicolous Fungi, Lichenized Fungi, Slime Molds, Mosses, and Liverworts. Fairbanks, Alaska: University of Alaska Press. ISBN 978-1602230583.

==== Northeastern United States ====
These are identification guides relevant to the Northeastern United States.

- Baroni, Timothy (2017). Mushrooms of the Northeastern United States and Eastern Canada. Portland, Oregon: Timber Press. ISBN 978-1604696349.
- Barron, George (2015). Mushrooms of Northeast North America. Vancouver, BC: Partners Publishing. ISBN 978-1772130003.
- Bessette, Alan (2006). Common Edible and Poisonous Mushrooms of New York. Syracuse, N.Y: Syracuse University Press. ISBN 978-0815608486.
- Bessette, Alan (1997). Mushrooms of Northeastern North America. Syracuse, N.Y: Syracuse University Press. ISBN 978-0815603887.
- Bessette, Arleen (2001). Mushrooms of Cape Cod and the National Seashore. Syracuse, N.Y: Syracuse University Press. ISBN 978-0815606888.
- Binion, Denise (2008). Macrofungi Associated With Oaks of Eastern North America. Morgantown: West Virginia University Press. ISBN 978-1933202365.
- Russell, Bill (2006). Field Guide to Wild Mushrooms of Pennsylvania and the Mid-Atlantic. University Park, Pa: Pennsylvania State University Press. ISBN 978-0271028910.

==== Midwestern United States ====
These are identification guides relevant to the Midwestern United States.

- Kauffman, C. H. (1971). The Gilled Mushrooms (Agaricaceae) of Michigan and the Great Lakes Region. New York: Dover Publications. ISBN 9780486223964.
- Kuo, Michael (2014). Mushrooms of the Midwest. Urbana: University of Illinois Press. ISBN 978-0252079764.
- McFarland, Joe (2009). Edible Wild Mushrooms of Illinois & Surrounding States: A Field-to-Kitchen Guide. Urbana: University of Illinois Press. ISBN 978-0252076435.
- Stone, Maxine (2010). Missouri's Wild Mushrooms: A Guide to Hunting, Identifying and Cooking the State's Most Common Mushrooms. Jefferson City, MO: Missouri Department of Conservation. ISBN 978-1887247740.

==== Pacific Northwest ====
These are identification guides focused on mushrooms found in the Pacific Northwest.

- Arora, David (1986). Mushrooms Demystified: A Comprehensive Guide to the Fleshy Fungi. Berkeley: Ten Speed Press. ISBN 978-0898151695.
- Desjardin, Dennis (2015). California Mushrooms: The Comprehensive Identification Guide. Portland, Oregon: Timber Press. ISBN 978-1604693539.
- McKenny, Margaret (1987). The New Savory Wild Mushroom. Seattle: University of Washington Press. ISBN 978-0295964805.
- Siegel, Noah (2016). Mushrooms of the Redwood Coast: A Comprehensive Guide to the Fungi of Coastal Northern California. Berkeley: Ten Speed Press. ISBN 978-1607748175.
- Trudell, Steve (2009). Mushrooms of the Pacific Northwest. Portland, Or: Timber Press. ISBN 978-0881929355.

==== Southwestern United States ====
These are identification guides relevant to the Southwestern United States.

- States, Jack (1990). Mushrooms and Truffles of the Southwest. Tucson, AZ.: The University of Arizona Press. ISBN 978-0816511921.

==== Southeastern United States ====
These are guides relevant to the Southeastern United States.

- Bessette, Alan (2019). Mushrooms of the Gulf Coast States. Austin, TX: University of Texas Press. ISBN 978-1-4773-1815-7.
- Bessette, Alan (2007). Mushrooms of the Southeastern United States. Syracuse, N.Y: Syracuse University Press. ISBN 978-0815631125.
- Kimbrough, James (2000). Common Florida Mushrooms. Gainesville, FL: University of Florida, Extension Institute of Food and Agricultural Sciences. ISBN 978-0916287306.
- Metzler, Susan (1992). Texas Mushrooms : A Field Guide. Austin: University of Texas Press. ISBN 978-0292751262.
- Roody, William (2003). Mushrooms of West Virginia and the Central Appalachians. Lexington, Kentucky: University Press of Kentucky. ISBN 9780813128139.
- Weber, Nancy (1985). A Field Guide to Southern Mushrooms. Ann Arbor: University of Michigan Press. ISBN 978-0472856152.

=== Field guides ===
These are identification guides small enough to take with you while mushroom hunting or on a hike.

- Arora, David (1991). All That the Rain Promises and More...: A Hip Pocket Guide to Western Mushrooms. Berkeley: Ten Speed Press. ISBN 978-0-89815-388-0.
- Marrone, Teresa (2016). Mushrooms of the Northeast: A Simple Guide to Common Mushrooms. Cambridge, MN: Adventure Publications. ISBN 978-1591935919.
- Marrone, Teresa (2014). Mushrooms of the Upper Midwest: A Simple Guide to Common Mushrooms. Cambridge, Minnesota: Adventure Publications, Inc. ISBN 978-1591934172.
- Lincoff, Gary (1981). National Audubon Society Field Guide to North American Mushrooms. New York: Knopf Distributed by Random House. ISBN 978-0394519920.
- Smith, Alexander and Weber, Nancy (1980). The Mushroom Hunter's Field Guide. Ann Arbor, MI: University of Michigan Press. ISBN 978-0-472-85610-7.
- Russel, Bill. (2006). Field Guide to Wild Mushrooms of Pennsylvania and the Mid-Atlantic. University Park, PA. University of Pennsylvania Press. ISBN 0-271-02891-2.

== Cultivation ==
These are books about growing mushrooms and fungiculture.

- Cotter, Tradd (2014). Organic Mushroom Farming and Mycoremediation: Simple to Advanced and Experimental Techniques for Indoor and Outdoor Cultivation. White River Junction, Vermont: Chelsea Green Publishing. ISBN 978-1603584555.
- Oss, O. T. (1991). Psilocybin: Magic Mushroom Grower's Guide: A Handbook for Psilocybin Enthusiasts. San Francisco, Calif: Quick American Pub. ISBN 978-0932551061.
- Stamets, Paul (2000). Growing Gourmet and Medicinal Mushrooms: Shokuyō Oyobi Yakuyō Kinoko No Saibai. Berkeley, Calif: Ten Speed Press. ISBN 1-58008-175-4.
- Stamets, Paul (1983). The Mushroom Cultivator: A Practical Guide to Growing Mushrooms at Home. Olympia, Wash. Seattle, Wa: Agarikon Press Western distribution by Homestead Book Co. ISBN 0-9610798-0-0.

== Fungal biology ==
These are books about mycology and fungal biology.

- Deacon, J. W. (2006). Fungal Biology. Malden, MA: Blackwell Pub. ISBN 978-1405130660.
- Kendrick, Bryce (2000). The Fifth Kingdom. Newburyport MA: Focus Pub. ISBN 978-1585100224.
- Petersen, Jens (2012). The Kingdom of Fungi. Princeton, N.J: Princeton University Press. ISBN 978-0691157542.
- Webster, John (2007). Introduction to Fungi. Cambridge, UK New York: Cambridge University Press. ISBN 978-0521014830.

== Ecology ==
These are books related to the intersection of fungi and ecology, such as mycoremediation.

- Gulden, Gro (1992). Macromycetes and Air Pollution: Mycocoenological Studies in Three Oligotrophic Spruce Forests in Europe. Berlin: J. Cramer. ISBN 9783443590451.
- McCoy, Peter (2016). Radical Mycology: A Treatise on Seeing & Working With Fungi. Portland, Oregon: Chthaeus Press. ISBN 978-0986399602.
- Sheldrake, Merlin (2020). Entangled Life: How Fungi Make Our Worlds, Change Our Minds & Shape Our Futures. New York: Random House. ISBN 9780525510314.
- Stamets, Paul (2005). Mycelium Running: How Mushrooms Can Help Save the World. Berkeley, Calif: Ten Speed Press. ISBN 978-1-58008-579-3.
- Varma, Ajit (2013). Symbiotic Fungi: Principles and Practice. Berlin: Springer Berlin. ISBN 978-3642260278.

== Food ==
These are books that explore mushrooms and fungi from the perspective of food and food science, e.g. books that explore the chemical and nutritional compositions of edible mushrooms, or books of recipes specializing in using wild mushrooms.

- Fischer, David (1992). Edible Wild Mushrooms of North America: A Field-to-Kitchen Guide. Austin: University of Texas Press. ISBN 978-0292720800.
- Johnston, Ruth (2012). The Art of Cooking Morels. Ann Arbor, MI: University of Michigan Press. ISBN 978-0-472-11784-0.
- Kalač, Pavel (2016). Edible Mushrooms: Chemical Composition and Nutritional Value. London Wall, UK: Elsevier, AP. ISBN 978-0128044551.
- Kuo, Michael (2007). 100 Edible Mushrooms. Ann Arbor: University of Michigan Press. ISBN 978-0-472-03126-9.
- Samson, Robert (2007). Food Mycology: A Multifaceted Approach to Fungi and Food. Boca Raton: CRC Press. ISBN 9780849398186.

== Health ==
These are books concerned with the health benefits of medicinal mushrooms.

- Stamets, Paul (2002). MycoMedicinals: An Informational Treatise on Mushrooms. Olympia: MycoMedia. ISBN 0-9637971-9-0.

== History ==
- Allegro, John (2009). The Sacred Mushroom and the Cross: A Study of the Nature and Origins of Christianity Within the Fertility Cults of the Ancient Near East. Place of publication not identified: Gnostic Media Research & Pub. ISBN 978-0982556276.
- Letcher, Andy (2008). Shroom: A Cultural History of the Magic Mushroom. New York: HarperCollins. ISBN 978-0060828295.
- Money, Nicholas P. (2004). Mr. Bloomfield's Orchard: The Mysterious World of Mushrooms, Molds, and Mycologists. Oxford: Oxford University Press. ISBN 9780195171587.

== Catalogs ==
These are books that don't act primarily as an identification guides but rather as catalogs, e.g. as a book of images of mushrooms with brief descriptions, or as a book listing species for a specific area without identifying information, etc.

- Roberts, Peter (2011). The Book of Fungi: A Life-Size Guide to Six Hundred Species From Around the World. Chicago London: The University of Chicago Press. ISBN 978-0226721170.

== Dictionaries and glossaries ==
These are books that define some of the technical jargon used within the field of mycology.

- Ainsworth, G. C. (2008). Ainsworth & Bisby's Dictionary of the Fungi. Wallingford, Oxon, UK: CABI. ISBN 9780851998268.
- Snell, Walter (1971). A Glossary of Mycology. Cambridge: Harvard University Press. ISBN 9780674354517.

== See also ==
- List of mycologists
