= All That the Rain Promises and More... =

Book by David Arora

All That the Rain Promises, and More...
- All That the Rain Promises and More...
- Author: David Arora
- Language: English
- Publisher: Ten Speed Press
- Publication date: 1991
- Publication place: United States
- Media type: Print (Paperback)
- Pages: 259

All That the Rain Promises, and More... is a wild mushroom identification and field guide by American mycologist David Arora and published in 1991 by Ten Speed Press in Berkeley, California. The book includes detailed descriptions of more than 200 edible and poisonous mushroom species, as well as recipes, stories, and information on uses of various species such as for dying hair and clothing or playing games. In the preface, Arora writes, "In leafing through these pages, you may wonder what all the 'fanciful,' 'foolish,' or (shudder) 'extraneous' material is doing in a factual guide. After all, it is the practical, hands-on, how-to-identify information that makes this book useful and gives it substance. But I ask: is it any stranger or less desirable to sprinkle the facts with flakes of fancy than it is to liven up solemn, substantial fare like potatoes with something fancier and more flavorful, like wild mushrooms?"

The book is the second major work by David Arora. Mushrooms Demystified was published in 1979, also by Ten Speed Press.

The book was generally well received among critics. Writing for The New York Times, critic Roger McKnight wrote that the book "is certainly the best guide to fungi, and may in fact be a long lasting masterpiece in guide writing for all subjects."

== See also ==
- List of books about mushrooms
