= Fungus Federation of Santa Cruz =

North American mycological club

- Official logo of the FFSC
- Abbreviation: FFSC
- Formation: 1984
- Founder: David Arora
- Type: 501(c)(3) non-profit organization
- Purpose: Mycology, Recreation, Fellowship
- Location: Santa Cruz, California, USA
- Region served: North California
- Method: Forays, Classes, Meetings, Fun&Food Events
- Prime Minister: Vellany Pierce
- Affiliations: North American Mycological Association
- Website: ffsc.us

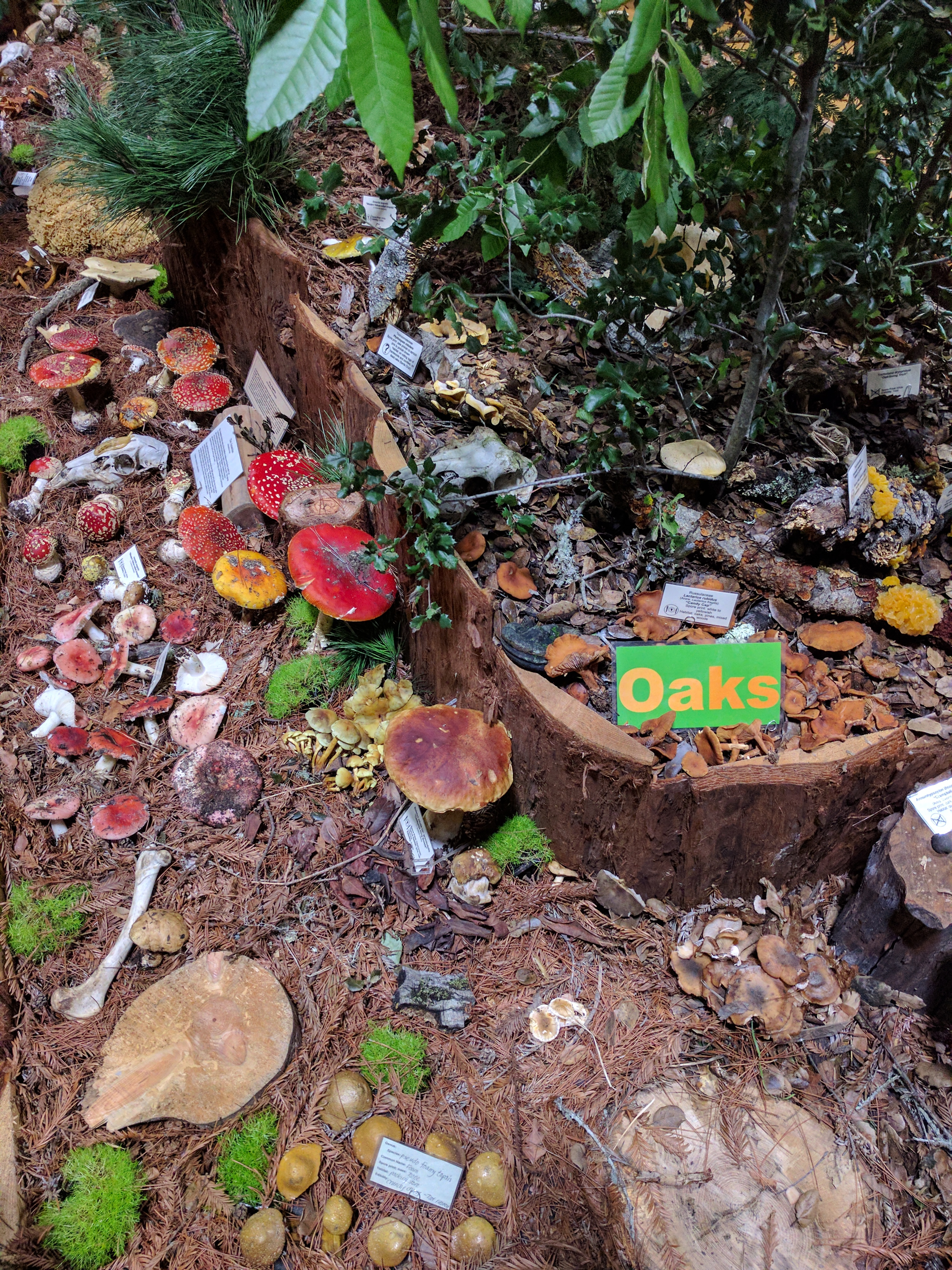
An exhibit of local fungi and their habitats at the 43rd annual Fungus Fair.

The Fungus Federation of Santa Cruz (FFSC) is a North American mycological club that evolved as a result of David Arora’s mushroom classes and early Fungus Fairs in the Santa Cruz, California area in the 1970’s.

== Mission ==
The mission of the Fungus Federation of Santa Cruz is "to foster and expand, through education and by example, the understanding and appreciation of mycology and to assist the general public and related institutions or groups to further this goal".

== Organization ==
FFSC was incorporated as a 501(c)(3) non-profit organization in 1984.

== Activities ==
There are many facets to the FFSC, with something to interest everyone. One of the FFSC's largest public and most popular events is an annual Fungus Fair. Members and non-members get together for local and long-distance forays, fun foodie events, meetings, and educational events. The FFSC also provides grants to mycology students and identification services to local hospitals.

The FFSC is currently embarking upon a project to fund DNA sequencing of herbarium specimens at the University of California, Santa Cruz. This initiative is part of the greater North American Mycoflora Project, a joint venture of the Mycological Society of America, and the North American Mycological Association. Their motto: “Without a sequenced specimen, it’s a rumor”.

== Membership ==
Membership is open to anyone who is interested in fungi. There is a small yearly membership fee which is discounted to the existing members. More information about the Fungus Federation of Santa Cruz membership can be found on FFSC Members Page.
