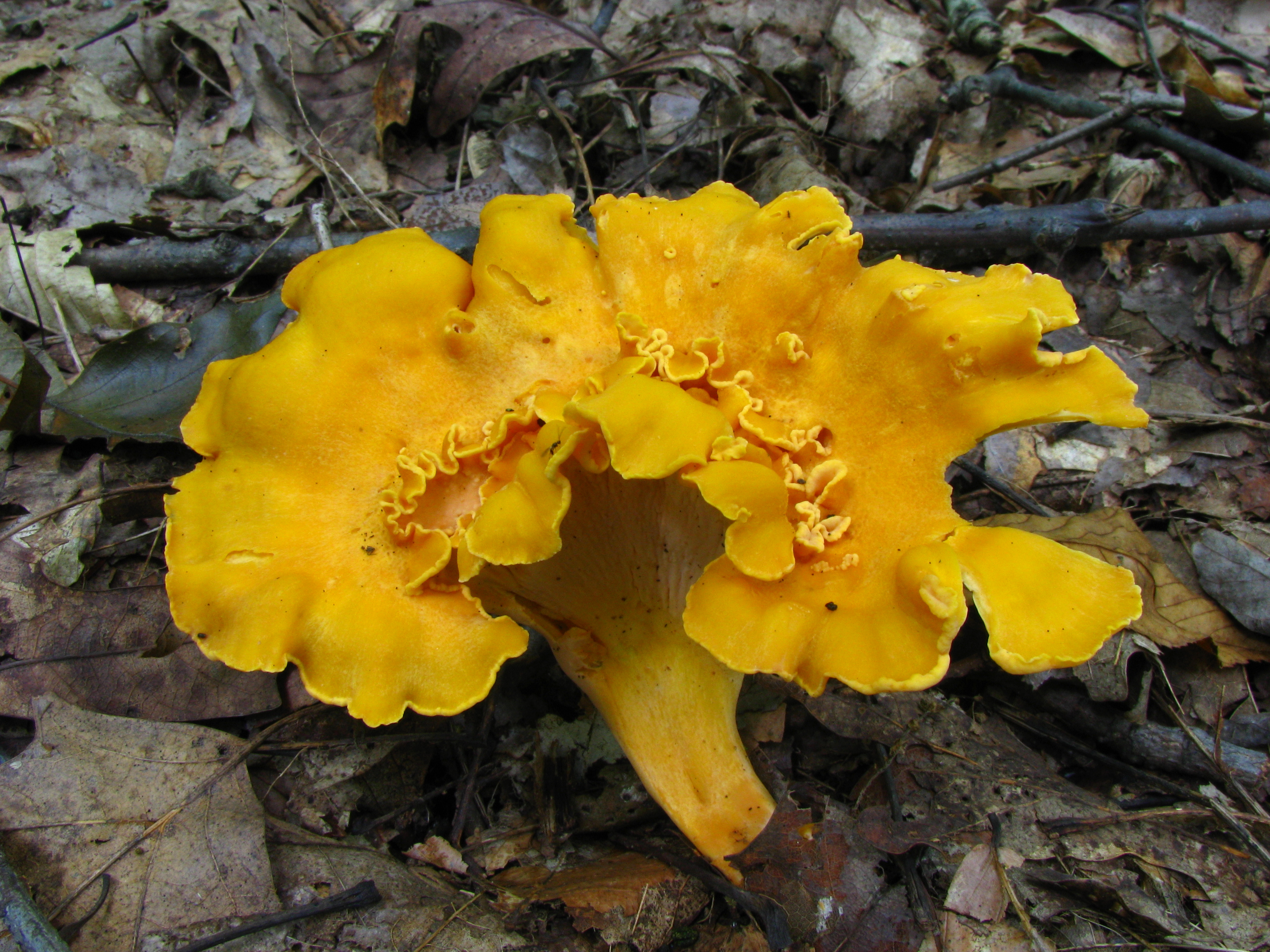
- In Wayne National Forest, Ohio, USA

Scientific classification
- Domain: Eukaryota
- Kingdom: Fungi
- Division: Basidiomycota
- Class: Agaricomycetes
- Order: Cantharellales
- Family: Cantharellaceae
- Genus: Cantharellus
- Species: C. lateritius

Binomial name
- Cantharellus lateritius (Berk.) Singer (1951)

Synonyms
- Thelephora cantharella Schw. (1822); Craterellus cantharellus (Schw.) Fr. (1838); Craterellus lateritius Berk. (1873); Trombetta lateritia (Berk.) Kuntze (1891)

= Cantharellus lateritius =

Species of fungus

Cantharellus lateritius Mycological characteristics
- Ridges on hymenium
- Cap is infundibuliform
- Hymenium is decurrent
- Stipe is bare
- Spore print is cream to salmon
- Ecology is mycorrhizal
- Edibility is choice

Cantharellus lateritius, commonly known as the smooth chanterelle, is a species of edible fungus in the mushroom family Cantharellaceae. The species has a complex taxonomic history, and has undergone several name changes since its first description by American mycologist Lewis David de Schweinitz in 1822. The fruit bodies of the fungus are brightly colored yellow to orange, and usually highly conspicuous against the soil in which they are found. At maturity, the mushroom resembles a filled funnel with the spore-bearing surface along the sloping outer sides. The texture of the fertile undersurface (hymenium) of the caps is a distinguishing characteristic of the species: unlike the well-known golden chanterelle, the hymenium of C. lateritius is much smoother.

Chemical analysis has revealed the presence of several carotenoid compounds in the fruit bodies. Found in Asia, Africa, and North America, the species forms ectomycorrhizal relationships.

== Taxonomy ==
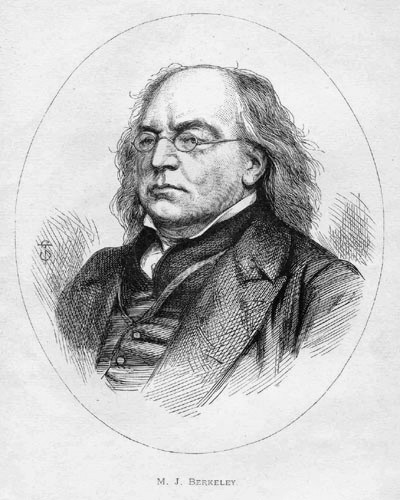
Berkeley is credited with the original authorship of the species.

The species was first described in the scientific literature as Thelephora cantharella by the American Lewis David de Schweinitz in 1822, based on specimens collected in Ohio. Elias Magnus Fries later transferred it to Craterellus in his 1838 Epicrisis Systematis Mycologici. In 1856, Miles Joseph Berkeley and Moses Ashley Curtis mentioned the fungus in their analysis of Schweinitz's specimens, but changed the epithet, calling it Craterellus lateritius. The motivation for the name change is unclear; Ronald H. Petersen, in a 1979 publication, suggests that Berkeley "was apparently reluctant to surrender his own name for the organism". Petersen suggests that Berkeley may have foreseen the necessity to avoid giving the species a tautonym (a situation where both the generic name and specific epithet are identical). However, as Petersen indicates, a future publication renders this explanation dubious: in 1873 Berkeley again referred to the species using his chosen name Craterellus lateritius, and indicated a type location (Alabama) different than the one mentioned by Schweinitz. Petersen considers Berkeley's name to be a nomen novum (new name), not a new species, as Berkeley clearly indicated that he thought Craterellus lateritius was synonymous with Schweinitz's Thelephora cantharella. Normally in these circumstances, Schweinitz's specimen would be considered the type, but Petersen was unable to locate Schweinitz's original specimen, and thus according to the rules of botanical nomenclature, Berkeley's epithet has precedence as it is the earliest published name that has an associated type specimen.

Another synonym is Trombetta lateritia, used by Otto Kuntze in his 1891 Revisio Generum Plantarum. American mycologist Rolf Singer transferred it to the genus Cantharellus in 1951. The mushroom is commonly known as the "smooth chanterelle". The specific name lateritius means "bricklike", and refers to the smooth hymenium.

== Description ==
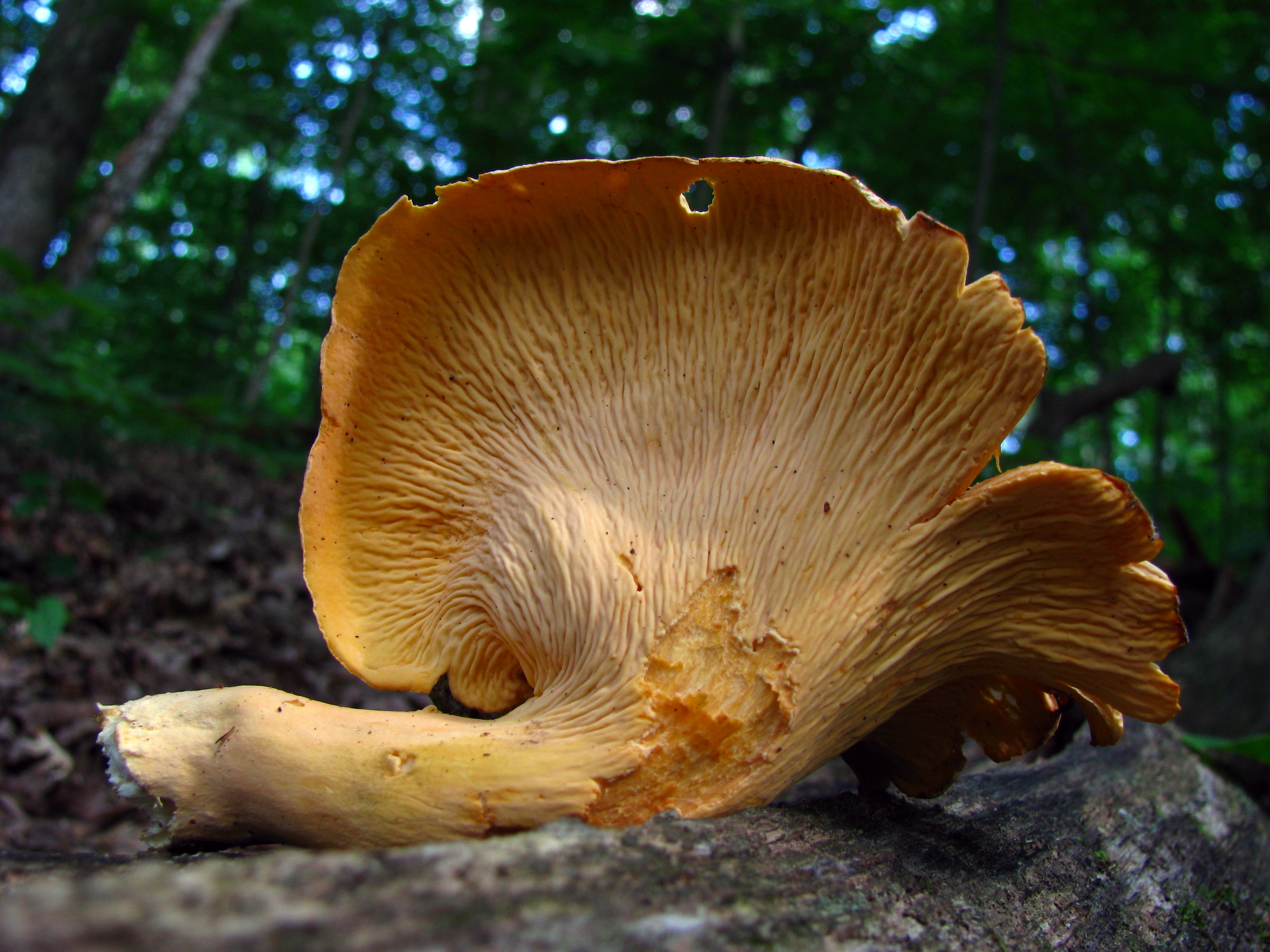
The hymenium is initially smooth before developing shallow vein-like ridges in maturity.

The caps of the C. lateritius fruiting bodies typically range between 2 and 12 cm (3/4 and 4 3/4 in) in diameter, with a flattened to somewhat funnel-shaped top surface and a wavy margin. The cap surface is dry, slightly tomentose (covered with a layer of fine hairs), and a deep and bright orange-yellow color, with older specimens fading to more yellow in age; the distinctive margins of the cap are a paler yellow, and typically curve downward in young specimens. Fruiting bodies can reach a height of 12 cm (4 3/4 in).

The hymenophore (the spore-bearing surface) is initially smooth and without wrinkles, but gradually develops channels or ridges, and what appear to be very shallow gills that are vein-like, and less than 1 mm wide. The color is pale yellow, and is continuous with the surface of the stem. The stem is rather plump and stout, 1.5 to 10 cm (1/2 to 4 in) long and 0.5 to 2 cm (1/4 to 3/4 in) thick, more or less cylindrical, tapering downwards towards the (sometimes white) base. Internally, the stems are either stuffed (filled with cotton-like mycelia) or solid. Rarely, fruiting bodies may be clumped together with stems conjoined at the base; in these cases there are usually no more than three fused stems. The flesh is solid to partly hollow (sometimes due to insect larvae), with a pale yellow color; it is 0.5 to 0.9 cm (1/4 to 3/8 in) thick.

The spores are smooth, with a roughly ellipsoid shape, and have typical dimensions of 7–7.5 by 4.5–5 μm. In deposit, such as in a spore print, the spores are light yellow orange, while under the microscope they are a very pale yellowish. The spore bearing cells—the basidia—are 75–80 by 7–9 μm, 4-5-6-spored, slightly club-shaped, and with a distinctly thickened wall at the base. Clamp connections (short branches connecting one cell to the previous cell to allow passage of the products of nuclear division) are present in the hyphae of all parts of the fruiting body.

=== Bioactive compounds ===
In a 1998 study, the carotenoid composition of this species was compared to several other Cantharellus species, including C. cibarus, C. cibarius var. amythysteus, and C. tabernensis. The carotenoid content between species was "virtually identical", comprising γ-carotene, α-carotene, and β-carotene. The only significant difference was that C. lateritius contained a significant quantity of an unidentified carotene that was thought to be a breakdown product of β-carotene.

=== Similar species ===
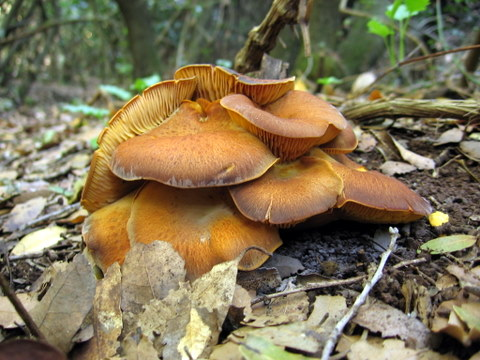
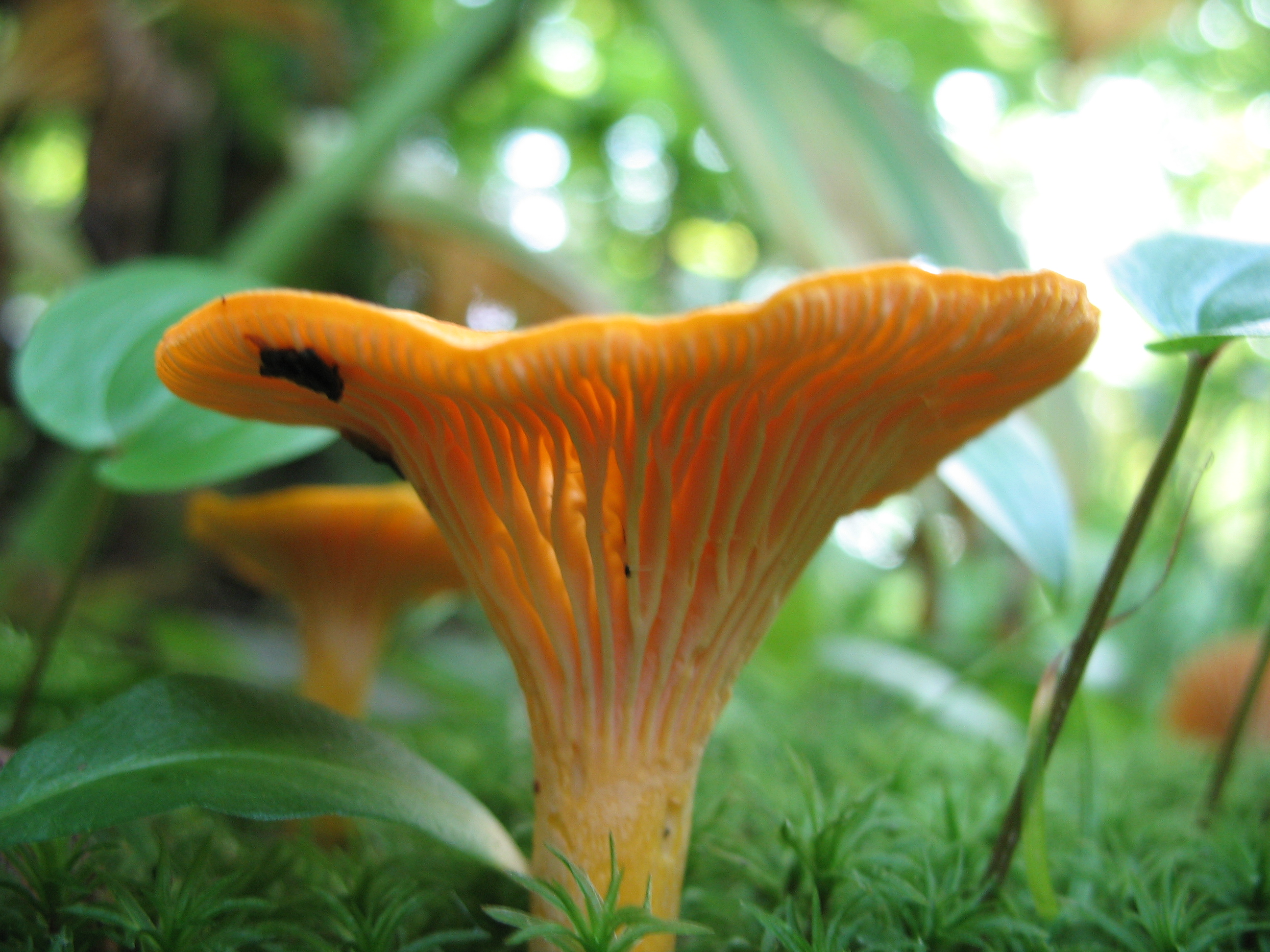
Potential lookalikes include the poisonous Omphalotus olearius (left) and the exceptional edible Cantharellus cibarius (right).

Cantharellus lateritius is pinker than the golden chanterelle (C. cibarius), and has thicker flesh in addition to the smoother hymenial surface. C. odoratus is also similar in appearance, and is distinguished by a thinner flesh and a hollow stem. Microscopy or DNA analysis is required to distinguish C. flavolateritius.

The poisonous "Jack O'Lantern" mushroom, Omphalotus olearius, is roughly similar in stature and color, but can be differentiated from C. lateritius by its true gills with sharply defined edges, and growth on decaying wood (although the wood may be buried in the soil), usually in large overlapping clusters. Craterellus odoratus is also similar.

One author considers C. lateritius to likely represent a species complex, including "all the chanterelles with a completely smooth hymenophore, sweet smell, and clamped hyphae".

== Distribution and habitat ==
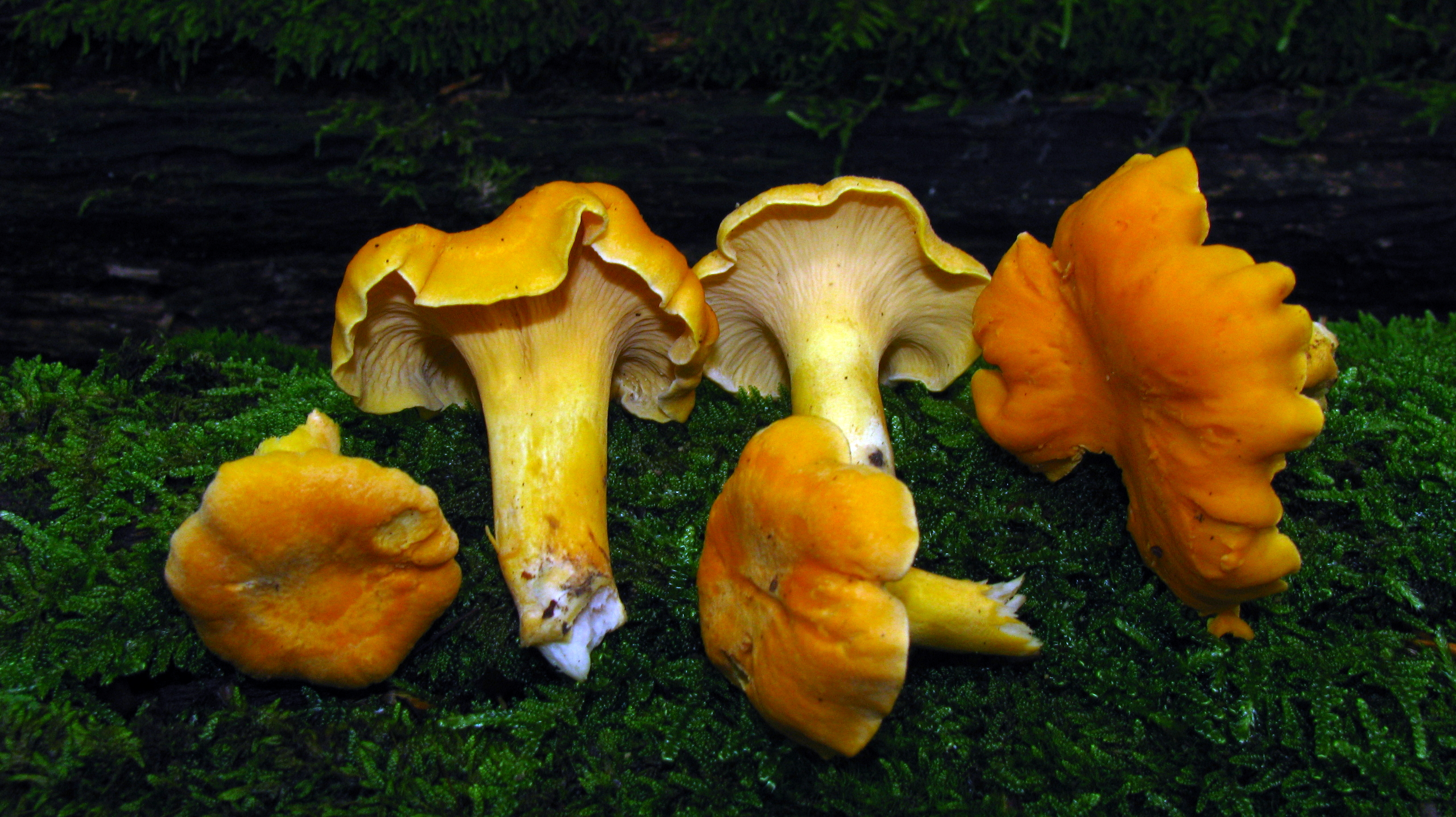
Not yet fully mature specimens from Strouds Run State Park, Ohio

Cantharellus lateritius is distributed in North America, Africa, Malaysia, and the Himalayas (specifically, the Almora hills in Uttar Pradesh). In North America, it appears from June to September, with its range in the United States extending northward to Michigan and New England.

Typically found growing solitary, in groups or in clusters under hardwood trees, the fungus produces fruit bodies in the summer and autumn. In the New England area of the United States, mycologist Howard Bigelow has noted it to grow on road shoulders in grass near oaks; it also has a predilection for growing on sloping creek banks. In Malaysia, it is found growing on the soil in forests, mostly under species of Shorea (rainforest trees in the family Dipterocarpaceae). C. lateritius has been reported from the Western Ghats, Kerala, India, forming ectomycorrhizal association with endemic tree species like Vateria indica, Hopea parviflora, Diospyros malabarica, and Myristica malabarica in semi-evergreen to evergreen forests.

== Edibility ==
Like all species in the genus Cantharellus, C. lateritius is edible, and often considered choice. The odor resembles apricots, and the taste is mild, or "moderately to faintly acrid". In the opinion of McFarland and Mueller, authors of a field guide to edible fungi of Illinois, compared to the well-known C. cibarius, C. lateritius is "in general ... somewhat disappointing when compared with their delicious relatives".
