= Psilocybin: Magic Mushroom Grower's Guide =

Book published in 1976

- Author: O. T. Oss and O. N. Oeric (Terence McKenna and Dennis McKenna)
- Language: English
- Subject: Growing psilocybin-containing mushrooms
- Genre: Non-fiction
- Publisher: And/Or Press; Lux Natura; Quick American Publishing
- Publication date: 1976
- Publication place: Berkeley, California
- ISBN: 978-0915904136
- OCLC: 2647420
- Website: Book PDF

Psilocybin: Magic Mushroom Grower's Guide: A Handbook for Psilocybin Enthusiasts is a short book about cultivation of psilocybin-containing mushrooms by authors with the pseudonyms O. T. Oss and O. N. Oeric, later revealed to be Terence McKenna and Dennis McKenna, which was published in 1976. A second, revised edition was subsequently published in 1986. The brothers developed novel, easy, and efficient methods for growing psilocybin-containing mushrooms and describe this in the book. The book sold over 150,000 copies. The popularization of psilocybin-containing mushrooms is attributed to the book and hence to the McKenna brothers, with psilocybin-containing mushrooms being rare and obscure prior to the book's publication.

== See also ==
- Terence McKenna § Psilocybin mushroom cultivation
- List of books about mushrooms
- List of psychedelic literature
