= Mycelium Running =

2005 book by Paul Stamets

Mycelium Running: How Mushrooms Can Help Save the World
- Front cover of first edition
- Author: Paul Stamets
- Language: English
- Subject: Mycoremediation
- Publisher: Ten Speed Press
- Publication date: 2005
- Publication place: United States
- Media type: Print (trade paperback)
- Pages: 339
- ISBN: 978-1-58008-579-3
- OCLC: 60603170
- Dewey Decimal: 579.5163
- LC Class: QK601 .S73 2005
- Preceded by: MycoMedicinals: An Informational Treatise on Mushrooms

Mycelium Running: How Mushrooms Can Help Save the World is the sixth book written by American mycologist Paul Stamets.

In Mycelium Running (Ten Speed Press 2005), Stamets explores the use and applications of fungi in bioremediation—a practice called mycoremediation. Stamets details methods of termite and ant control using nontoxic mycelia, and describes how certain fungi may be able to neutralize anthrax, nerve gas, and smallpox. He includes the following with regard to the mycelium:

Is this the largest organism in the world? This 2,400-acre (9.7 km^{2}) site in eastern Oregon had a contiguous growth of mycelium before logging roads cut through it. Estimated at 1,665 football fields in size and 2,200 years old, this one fungus has killed the forest above it several times over, and in so doing has built deeper soil layers that allow the growth of ever-larger stands of trees. Mushroom-forming forest fungi are unique in that their mycelial mats can achieve such massive proportions.

== See also ==
- List of books about mushrooms
