= David Arora =

American mycologist

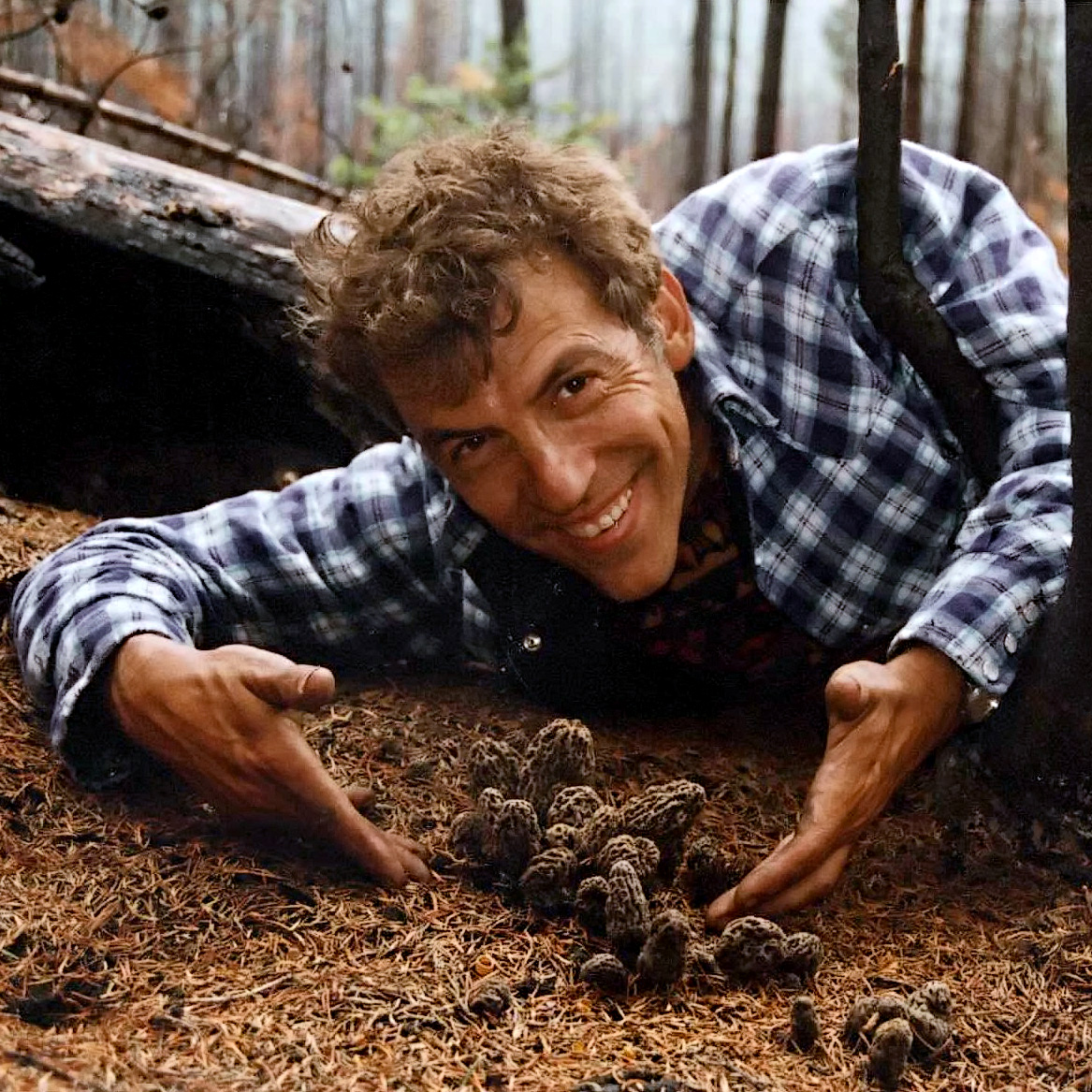
- David Arora with morel mushrooms, circa 2000
- Born: October 23, 1952 (age 73); India
- Known for: Author of Mushrooms Demystified
- Scientific career
- Fields: Mycology
- Author abbrev. (botany): D.Arora

David Arora (born October 23, 1952) is an American mycologist, naturalist, and writer. He is the author of two popular books on mushroom identification, Mushrooms Demystified and All That the Rain Promises and More....

Arora first developed an interest in wild mushrooms while growing up in Pasadena, California and organized his first mushroom collecting group while in high school. Later, an idea to start a mushroom club came about, and in 1984 he founded The Fungus Federation of Santa Cruz. He began teaching about wild mushrooms in the early 1970s while living in Santa Cruz, California. Arora has traveled extensively throughout North America and the world, photographing and hunting mushrooms and learning about the mushroom gathering traditions and economies of different cultures.

Mushrooms Demystified was first published in 1979 and was republished in a revised and substantially expanded edition in 1986. Though Mushrooms Demystified encountered some initial resentment and negative reviews among academic mycologists when it first appeared, the mushroom key and descriptions in this work are highly regarded and the book is recommended by a number of mycological authors. The smaller All That the Rain Promises and More... followed in 1991.

In addition to his field guides, he has written several articles on amateur and commercial mushroom hunting, its role in the economic development of rural communities, and about conflicts related to conservation issues related to mushroom hunting.

Arora has also authored or contributed to several papers on fungal taxonomy. In 1982, he co-authored an extensive description of the stinkhorn species Clathrus archeri, documenting its first known appearance in North America, an extensive fruiting of this species in his home town of Santa Cruz. In 2008, he was primary author of two papers that provided a taxonomic revision of the California golden chanterelle and of several species in the Boletus edulis complex found in California. The California golden chanterelle was described as a distinct species, Cantharellus californicus, while several California porcini species were described as distinct species or subspecies, Boletus edulis var. grandedulis, Boletus regineus (formerly described as Boletus aereus), and Boletus rex-veris (formerly described as Boletus pinophilus).

The mushroom Agaricus arorae is named after David Arora. In his book All that the Rain Promises and More..., Arora notes that it "'bleeds' readily like its namesake when cut," a reference to the tendency of some Agaricus species (including A. arorae) to "bleed" or stain red when cut or bruised. In 2004 Arora left his long-time home of Santa Cruz and moved north to Mendocino county settling near the coastal town of Gualala, California.

== See also ==
- List of mycologists
