= Homestead Book Company =

Publisher and wholesale distributor

Coordinates: 47.67325°N 122.385083°W

- Type: Distributor, Publisher
- Industry: Book selling
- Founded: 1972
- Founder: David Tatelman
- Defunct: 2017
- Headquarters: Seattle, Washington, US
- Area served: Worldwide
- Key people: David Tatelman; Founder, Owner
- Website: Official website

Homestead Book Company was a publisher and wholesale distributor of books, magazines, videos, games, and novelty items. Founded in 1972 and closed in 2017, the organization was located in Seattle, Washington. They specialized in counter-cultural books and distributed over 3,000 titles to retailers as well as through their own mail-order business.

== History ==
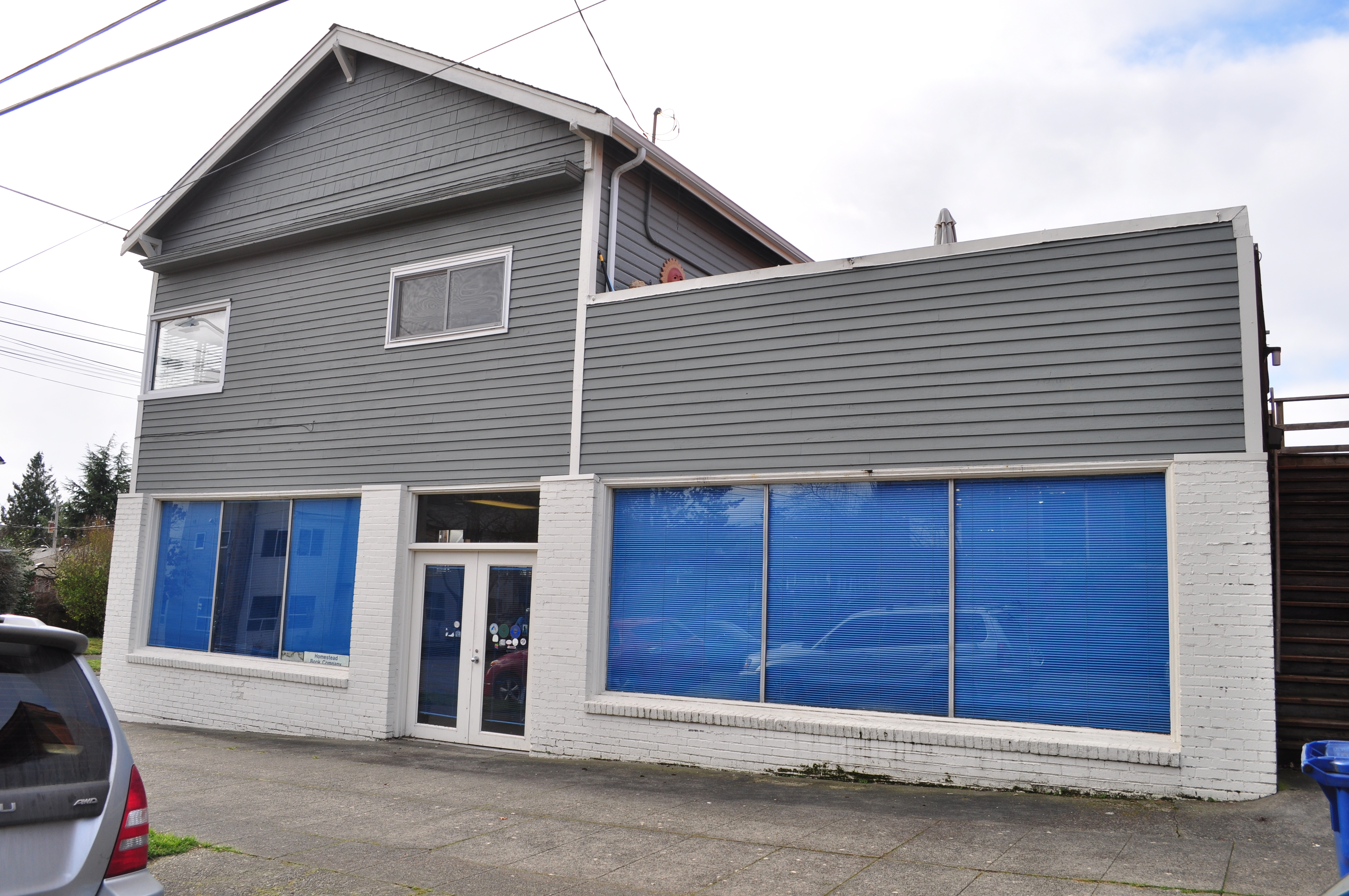
Homestead Book Company, 6101 22nd Avenue NW, in the Ballard neighborhood of Seattle, Washington.

Homestead Book Company was founded in 1972 by David Tatelman. They began as a distributor of underground comix for Rip Off Press. Tatelman initially delivered comix to various accounts between Olympia and Bellingham in Washington. The company soon began distributing books with their first book being The Complete Guide to Growing Marijuana by David Fleming. Homestead Book Company was also one of the first distributors for High Times Magazine.

== Mushroom kits ==
During the Teononacatl Mushroom Conference in 1977, Tatelman met with author Bob Harris and they decided to start offering home grown Psilocybe mushroom kits. The kits were introduced using growing methods that were outlined in Harris' book Growing Wild Mushrooms. The first kits were introduced in 1978 and sold through advertisements in High Times Magazine. The kits are still on the market and are now referred to by the name EZ-Gro Mushroom Kits.

== Published books ==
Homestead Book Company also published many books over the years, including several associated with the growing and cultivating of Psilocybe Mushrooms.

- Miller, Richard; and Tatelman, David. Magical Mushroom Handbook, 1977. ISBN 978-0930180010
- Stamets, Paul. Psilocybe Mushrooms and Their Allies, 1978. ISBN 978-0930180034
- Jackson, Michael; Cottone, Vince; and Chieger, Bob. Good Beer Guide: Breweries and Pubs of the Pacific Northwest, 1986. ISBN 978-0930180096
- Chieger, Bob. Poor Man's Gourmet Guide to Seattle Restaurants, 1986. ISBN 978-0930180089
- Flenniken, Shary. Seattle Laughs: Comic Stories About Seattle, 1994. ISBN 978-0930180133

== Philanthropy ==
In Seattle, Homestead was a co-sponsor of the 4th of July fireworks and Seattle Hempfest.
