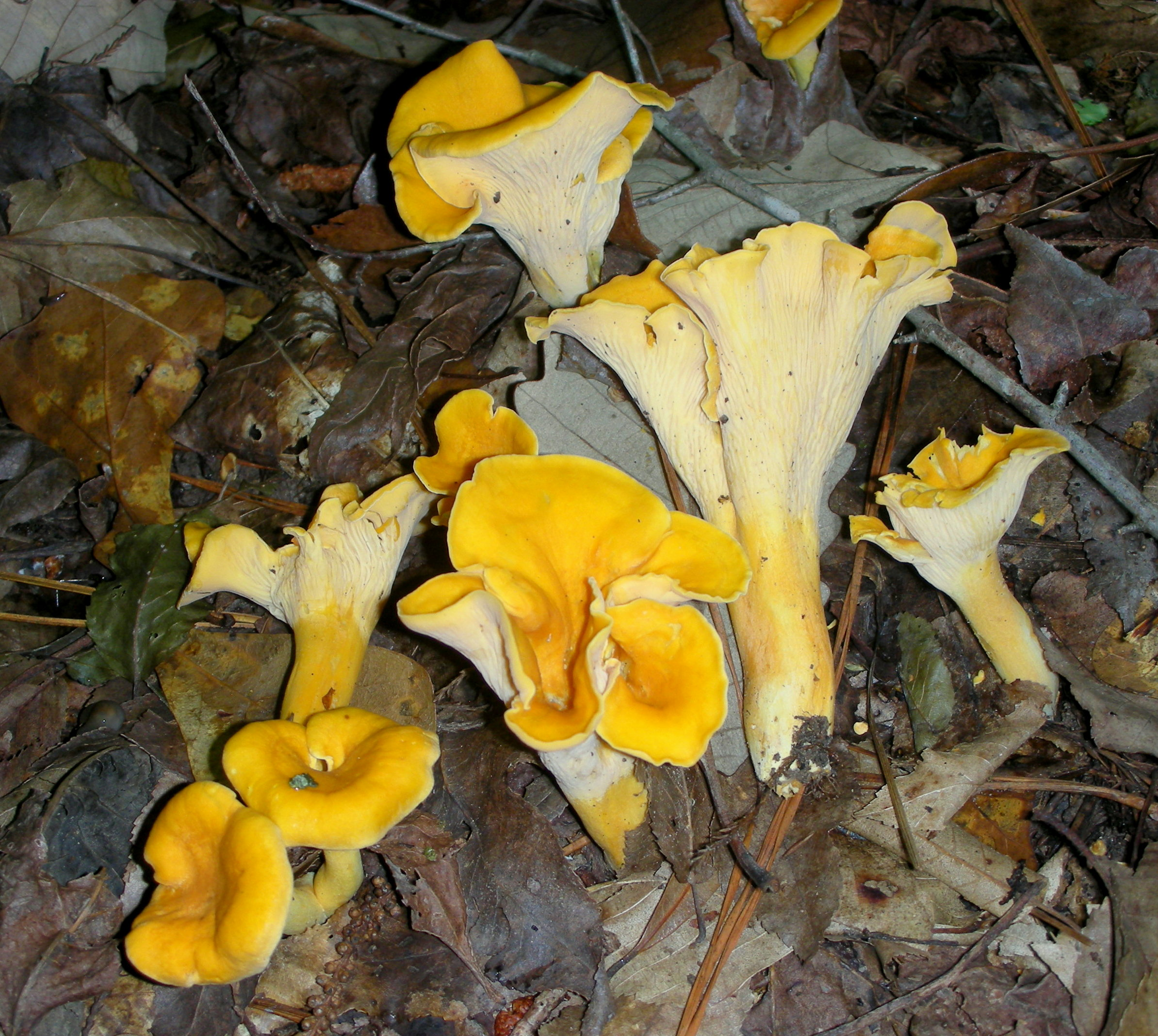

Scientific classification
- Domain: Eukaryota
- Kingdom: Fungi
- Division: Basidiomycota
- Class: Agaricomycetes
- Order: Cantharellales
- Family: Cantharellaceae
- Genus: Cantharellus
- Species: C. confluens

Binomial name
- Cantharellus confluens (Berk. & M.A. Curtis) R.H. Petersen

Synonyms
- Merulius confluens Schwein. 1822

= Cantharellus confluens =

Species of fungus

Cantharellus confluens is a species of Cantharellus found in North America.

== Distribution ==
This mushroom is found in southern Appalachians, southeastern United States, and Mexico.
