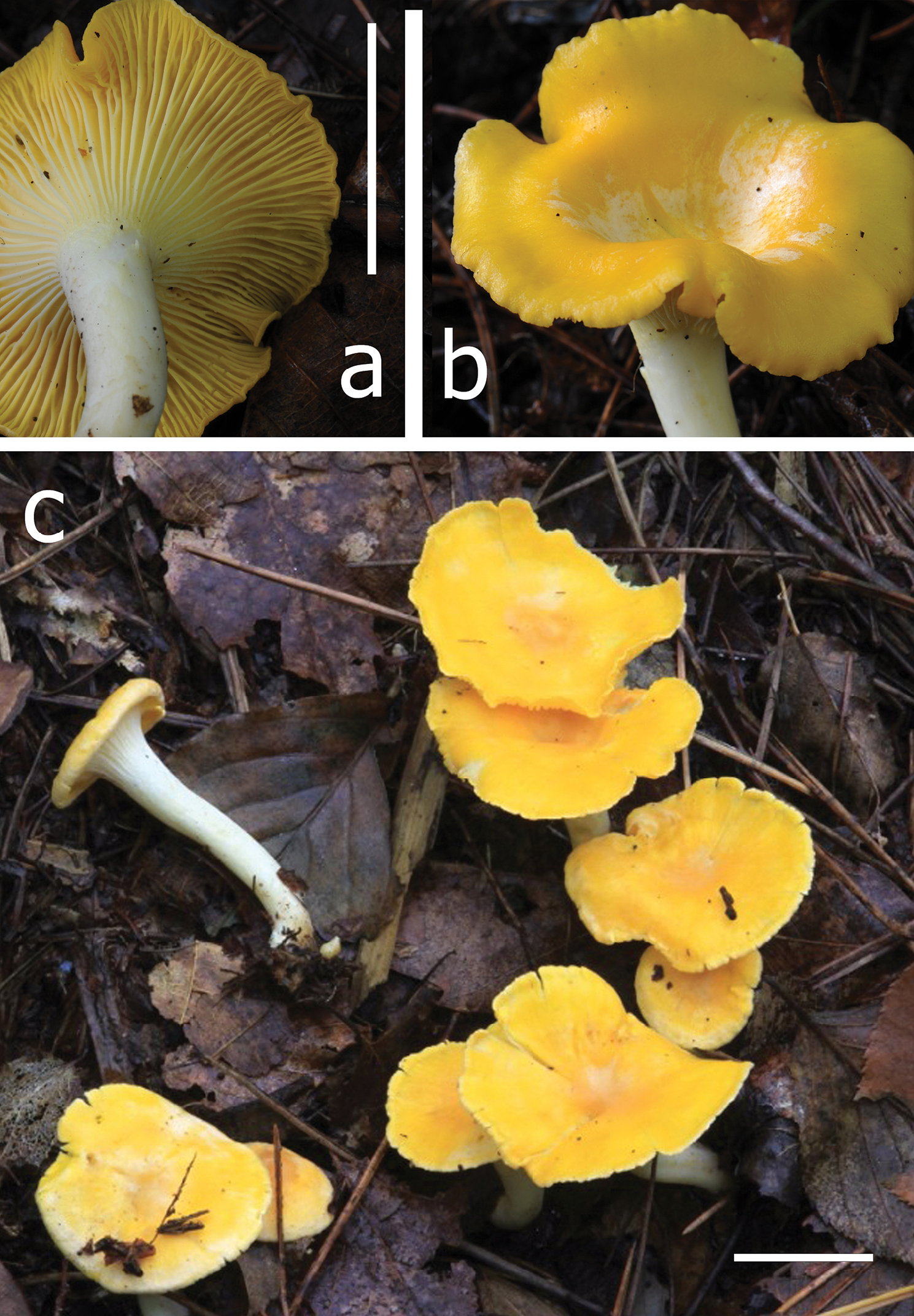

Scientific classification
- Kingdom: Fungi
- Division: Basidiomycota
- Class: Agaricomycetes
- Order: Cantharellales
- Family: Cantharellaceae
- Genus: Cantharellus
- Species: C. applanatus

Binomial name
- Cantharellus applanatus D. Kumari, Ram. Upadhyay & Mod.S. Reddy, 2013

Synonyms
- Cantharellus anzutake W. Ogawa, N. Endo, M. Fukuda & A. Yamada, 2017

= Cantharellus applanatus =

Species of fungus

Cantharellus applanatus
- Mycological characteristics
- Ridges on hymenium
- Cap is infundibuliform
- Hymenium is decurrent
- Stipe is bare
- Spore print is cream
- Ecology is mycorrhizal
- Edibility is choice

Cantharellus applanatus is a species of fungus, native to India, China, Japan and Korea. It is a member of the subgenus Cantharellus of the genus Cantharellus along with other popular edible chanterelles.

== Taxonomy ==
Part of the Cantharellus cibarius species complex, C. applanatus was described in 2013 by Deepika, Upadhyay and Reddy.

Named after the Japanese common name of chanterelle, anzutake (杏茸), C. anzutake was described by Ogawa et al. (2017) based on the ITS1 sequence difference between C. anzutake and C. applanatus. This difference was later found to be intraspecific and hence C. anzutake was found to be conspecific with C. applanatus by Wang et al. (2023).

== Description ==
The pileus (cap) is 10–40 millimetres (1/2–1 1/2 in) wide, and yellow, sometimes with a darker center. The hymenium is folded into decurrent ridges (false gills) and cross-veins. The color of these ridges is usually similar to the cap, becoming whitish to pale cream near the stipe (stem). The stem is 20–40 mm (3/4–1 5/8 in) long and 3.5–6 mm (1/8–1/4 in) wide, with white coloration. The spores are ellipsoid to ovoid, 7.3–8.8 × 5.1–6.1 μm.

== Distribution and habitat ==
Native to India, China, Japan and Korea, this species forms a mycorrhizal association with Pinus densiflora, Carpinus laxiflora, and Quercus mongolica.

== Uses ==
This is an edible mushroom.

=== Cultivatability ===
A method of obtaining a pure culture from mycorrhizae has been described, and repeated fruiting of potted pine seedlings inoculated with the culture has been reported, potentially making cultivation feasible.
