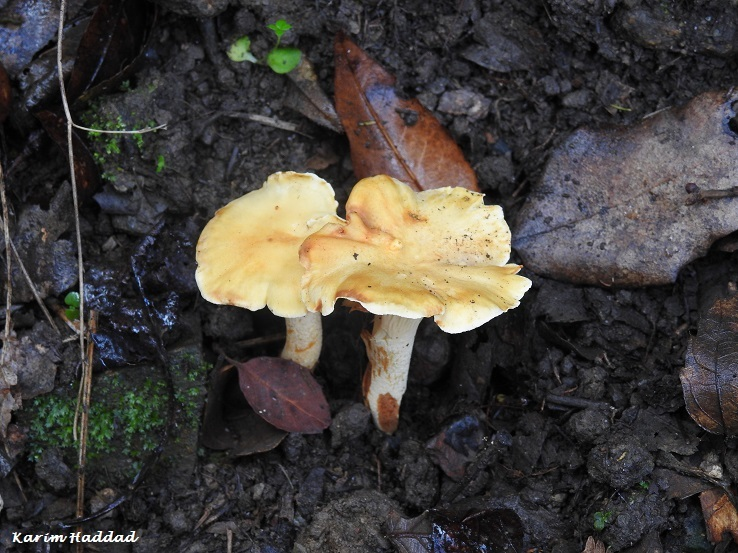

Scientific classification
- Domain: Eukaryota
- Kingdom: Fungi
- Division: Basidiomycota
- Class: Agaricomycetes
- Order: Cantharellales
- Family: Cantharellaceae
- Genus: Cantharellus
- Species: C. alborufescens

Binomial name
- Cantharellus alborufescens (Malençon) Papetti & S. Alberti

= Cantharellus alborufescens =

Species of fungus

Cantharellus alborufescens is a species of Cantharellus found in Europe.

== Distribution ==
C alborufescens is found growing in Oak forest among Quercus ilex and Quercus pubescens.
