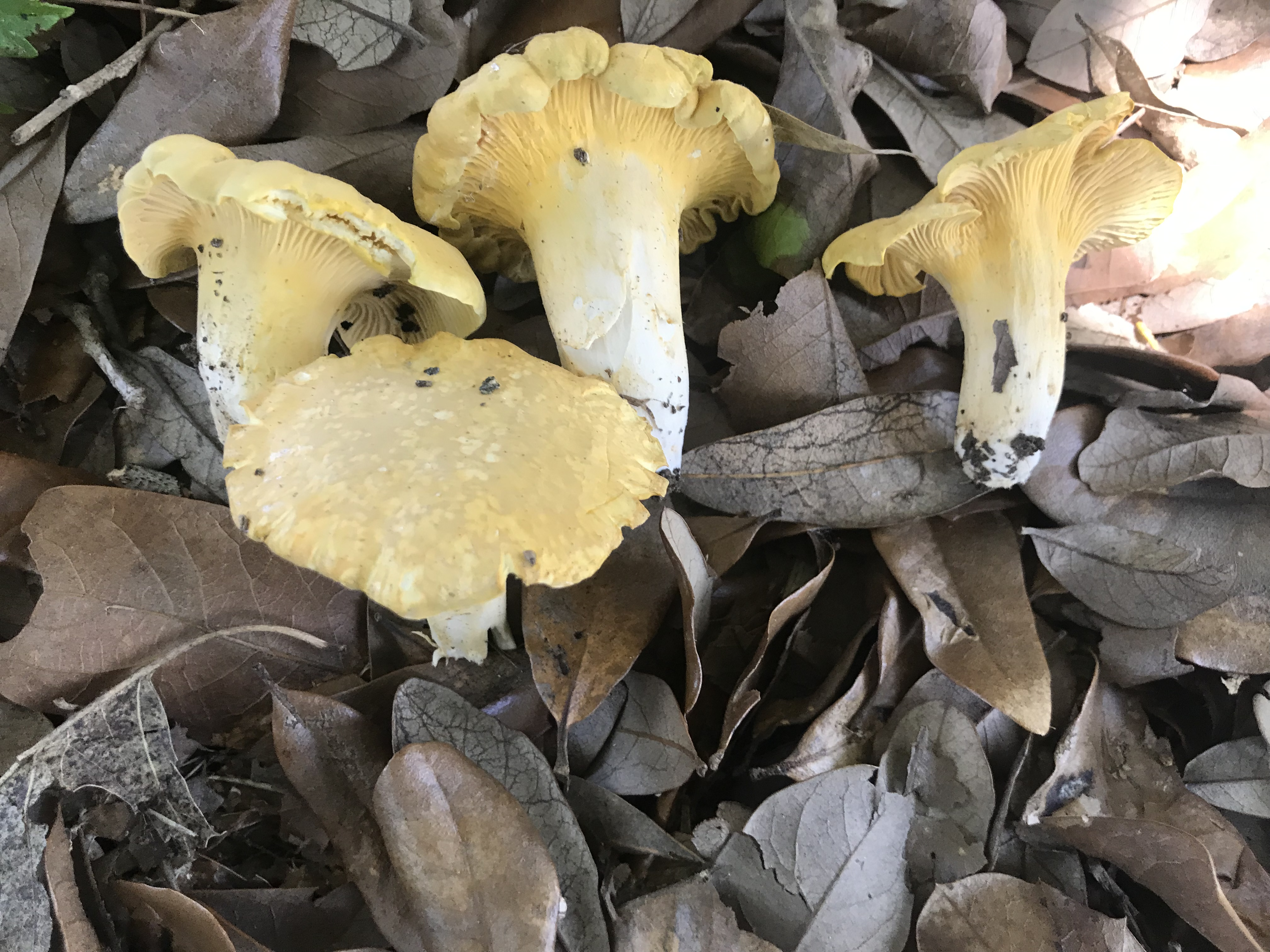

Scientific classification
- Kingdom: Fungi
- Division: Basidiomycota
- Class: Agaricomycetes
- Order: Cantharellales
- Family: Cantharellaceae
- Genus: Cantharellus
- Species: C. iuventateviridis

Binomial name
- Cantharellus iuventateviridis Buyck, Looney, Harsch & V. Hofst

= Cantharellus iuventateviridis =

Species of fungus

Cantharellus iuventateviridis is a species of Cantharellus found in North America. As of 2026, it has been assessed a determination of Data Deficient from the IUNC, due to lack of data to qualify its population range, size trends, and preferred habitat.

== Distribution ==
This species is found in the Southern United States, primarily in southern Louisiana, and east into Florida. IIt observed growth patterns are ectomycorrhizal with Quercus nigra., however, Pine and American Hornbeam were noted in the growth range.

At this present moment, given the small sample size of the studied range, more ecological data will be required to conclusively determine Cantharellus iuventateviridis's growth patterns, and ecological restraints.
