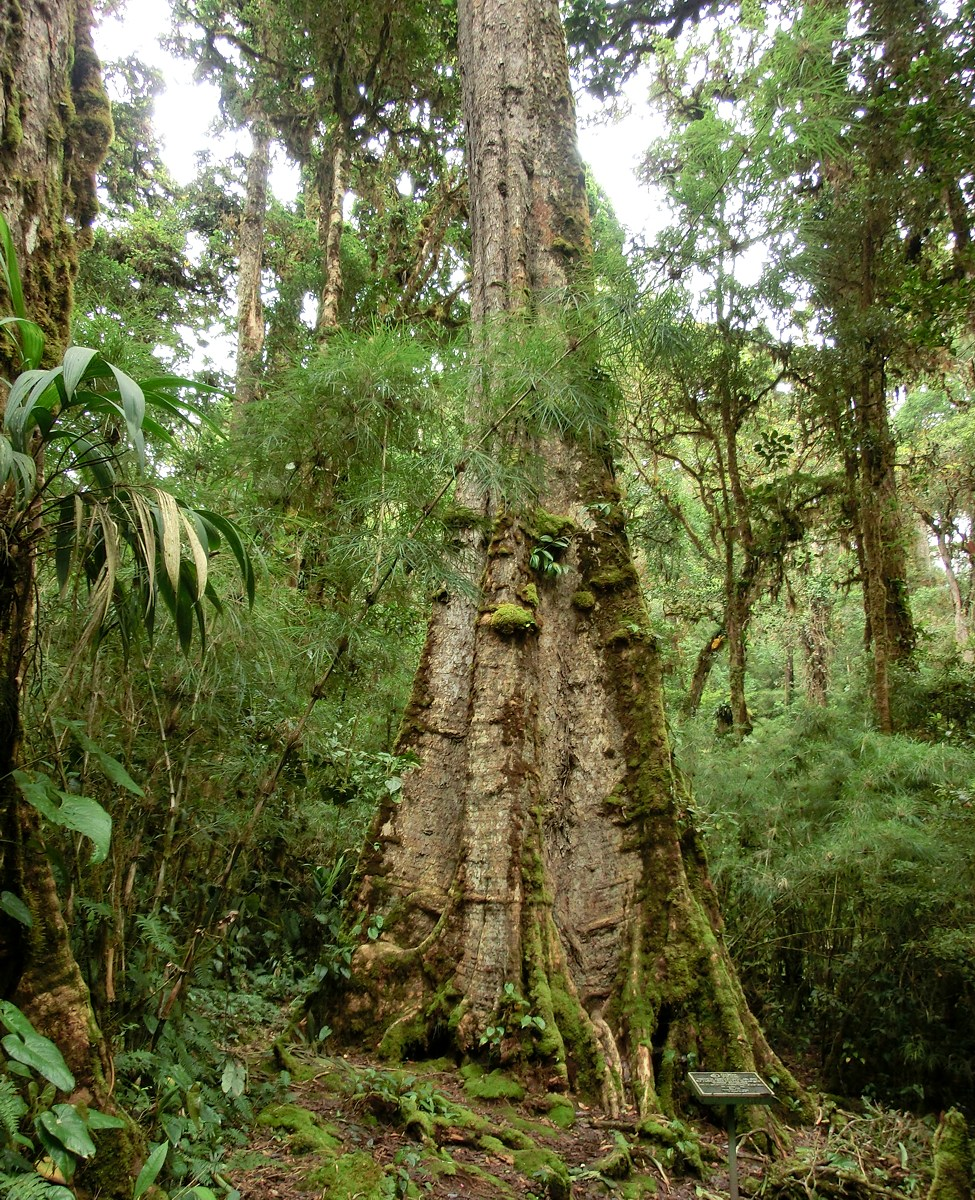

Conservation status
- Least Concern (IUCN 3.1)

Scientific classification
- Kingdom: Plantae
- Clade: Embryophytes
- Clade: Tracheophytes
- Clade: Spermatophytes
- Clade: Angiosperms
- Clade: Eudicots
- Clade: Rosids
- Order: Fagales
- Family: Fagaceae
- Genus: Quercus
- Subgenus: Quercus subg. Quercus
- Section: Quercus sect. Lobatae
- Species: Q. sapotifolia

Binomial name
- Quercus sapotifolia Liebm.

Synonyms
- List: Quercus sapotaefolia Liebm.; Quercus acutifolia var. microcarpa A.DC.; Quercus amissiloba Trel.; Quercus apanecana Trel.; Quercus bumelioides Liebm.; Quercus correpta Trel.; Quercus donnell-smithii Trel.; Quercus elliptica Liebm. ex A.DC.; Quercus elliptica var. microcarpa A.DC.; Quercus microcarpa Liebm.; Quercus parviglans Trel.; Quercus parviglans f. polycarpa Trel.; Quercus parviglans f. tejadana Trel.; Quercus persiifolia Liebm.; Quercus persiifolia var. achoteana Trel. ex Yunck.; Quercus persiifolia f. microcarpa Trel.; Quercus siguatepequeana Trel.; Quercus totutlensis A.DC.; Quercus wesmaelii Trel.

= Quercus sapotifolia =

Species of oak tree

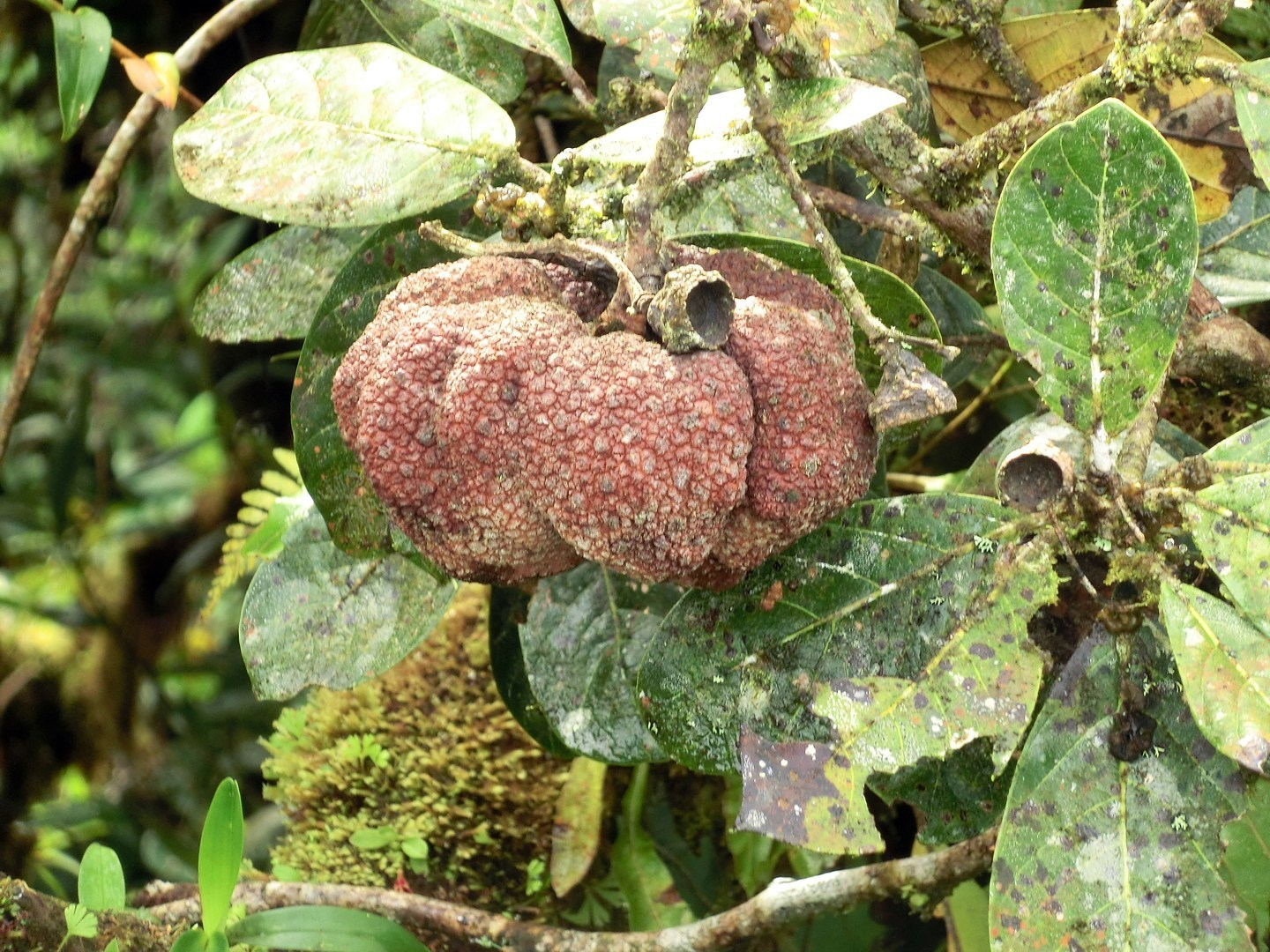
A gall on Q. sapotifolia, showing leaves (marred by insect damage and disease)

Quercus sapotifolia is a species of oak. It is native to southern and western Mexico (as far north as Michoacán) as well as Central America. It is threatened by habitat loss.

== Description ==
Quercus sapotifolia grows to a medium-sized tree.

== Range and habitat ==
Quercus sapotifolia ranges through the mountains and foothills of eastern and southern Mexico and through Central America as far as central Panama, between 250 and 2,000 meters elevation.

In Mexico it is found in the southern Sierra Madre Oriental, Sierra Madre de Oaxaca, eastern Sierra Madre del Sur, as well as the Chiapas Highlands and Sierra Madre de Chiapas in the states of Hidalgo, Veracruz, Puebla, Oaxaca, and Chiapas. It is also found in the highlands of Central America, including the Sierra Madre de Chiapas and Guatemalan Highlands of Guatemala, the Maya Mountains of Belize, the Chortis Highlands of El Salvador, Honduras, and Nicaragua, and the Cordillera de Talamanca of Costa Rica and western Panama.

It grows in cloud forests, pine-oak forests, open pine woodlands. It often grows on coarse soils derived from sandstones, rapidly-draining igneous rocks with high quartz content, and rhyolitic soils with high quartz and clay content. It can grow in disturbed areas, including areas subject to fires, where soils have been eroded or leached.
