= Paul Stamets =

American mycologist (born 1955)

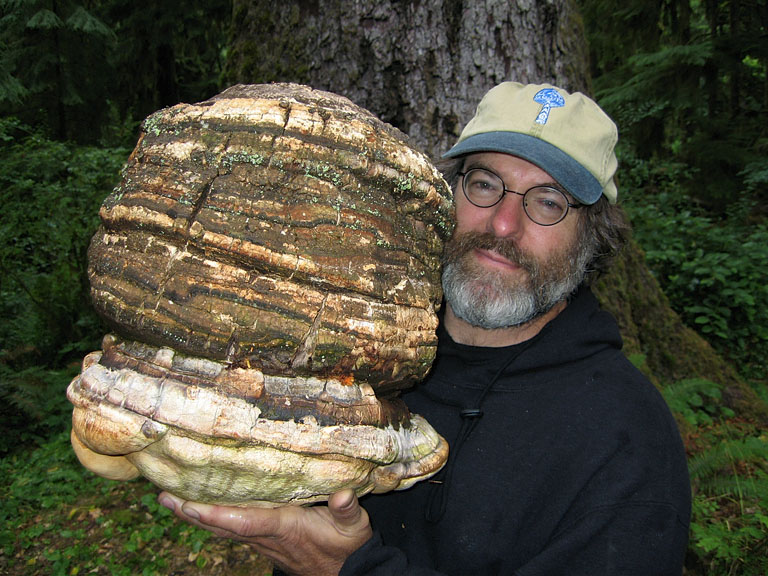
- Stamets holding Laricifomes officinalis in 2006
- Born: July 17, 1955 (age 71); Salem, Ohio, U.S.
- Education: Mercersburg Academy
- Alma mater: The Evergreen State College
- Writing career
- Subject: Fungi
- Website: paulstamets.com

Paul Edward Stamets (born July 17, 1955) is an American mycologist and entrepreneur who sells various mushroom products through his company. He is an author and an advocate of medicinal fungi and mycoremediation.

== Early and personal life ==
Stamets was born in Salem, Ohio. He grew up in Columbiana, Ohio, with older and younger siblings. He graduated from The Evergreen State College in Olympia, Washington, with a bachelor's degree in 1979. He worked as a logger. As of 2013, Stamets was married to Carolyn "Dusty" Yao. He has an honorary doctorate from the National University of Natural Medicine in Portland.

== Mycological interest ==
Stamets credits his late brother, John, with stimulating his interest in mycology, and studied mycology as an undergraduate student. Having no academic training higher than a bachelor's degree, Stamets is largely self-taught in the field of mycology.

Stamets received the 'Bioneers' Award from the Collective Heritage Institute in 1998 and the 'Award for Contributions to Amateur Mycology' from the North American Mycological Association in 2013. He also received an Invention Ambassador (2014–2015) award from the American Association for the Advancement of Science (AAAS).

== In popular culture ==
Stamets plays a significant part in the 2019 documentary film Fantastic Fungi, and edited the film's official companion book, Fantastic Fungi: Expanding Consciousness, Alternative Healing, Environmental Impact.

The character Lieutenant Commander Paul Stamets on the CBS series Star Trek: Discovery was named after the real Stamets. The fictional version is an astromycologist and engineer aboard the USS Discovery, and is credited with discovering how to navigate a mycelial network in space using a "spore drive".

== Books ==
- Psilocybe Mushrooms & Their Allies (1978), Homestead Book Company, ISBN 978-0-930180-03-4
- The Mushroom Cultivator: A Practical Guide to Growing Mushrooms at Home (1983), Paul Stamets and J. S. Chilton, Agarikon Press, ISBN 9780961079802
- Growing Gourmet and Medicinal Mushrooms (1993; 3rd edition: 2000), Ten Speed Press, ISBN 978-1-58008-175-7
- Psilocybin Mushrooms of the World (1996), Ten Speed Press, ISBN 978-0-89815-839-7
- Mycelium Running: How Mushrooms Can Help Save the World (2005), Ten Speed Press, ISBN 978-1-58008-579-3)
- Fantastic Fungi: How Mushrooms Can Heal, Shift Consciousness & Save the Planet (2019), Earth Aware Editions, ISBN 978-1-68383-704-6, 978-1683837046
- Psilocybin Mushrooms in Their Natural Habitats: A Guide to the History, Identification, and Use of Psychoactive Fungi (2025), Ten Speed Press, ISBN 978-0593839003

== Eponyms of Paul Stamets ==
=== Eponymous species ===
- Psilocybe stametsii Dentinger & Furci
