= Golden chanterelle =

Golden chanterelle is the common name for several fungi species; golden chanterelle may refer to:

- Cantharellus anzutake, the Japanese golden chanterelle
- Cantharellus californicus, the California golden chanterelle
- Cantharellus cibarius, the golden chanterelle (native to Europe, and the namesake of the now-subdivided Cantharellus cibarius species complex)
- Cantharellus flavus, the American golden chanterelle, or Midwestern golden chanterelle
- Cantharellus formosus, the Pacific golden chanterelle
