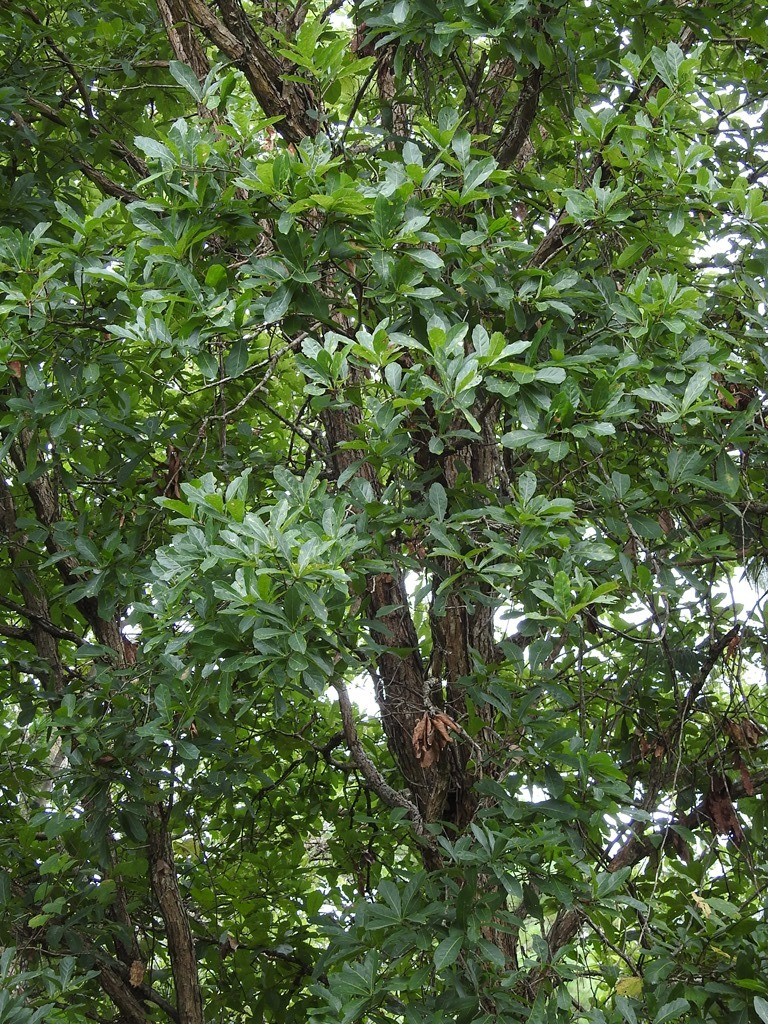

Conservation status
- Least Concern (IUCN 3.1)

Scientific classification
- Kingdom: Plantae
- Clade: Embryophytes
- Clade: Tracheophytes
- Clade: Spermatophytes
- Clade: Angiosperms
- Clade: Eudicots
- Clade: Rosids
- Order: Fagales
- Family: Fagaceae
- Genus: Quercus
- Subgenus: Quercus subg. Quercus
- Section: Quercus sect. Quercus
- Species: Q. glaucescens

Binomial name
- Quercus glaucescens Bonpl.

Synonyms
- List: Dryopsila cuneifolia (Raf.) Raf.; Quercus chinantlensis Liebm.; Quercus cuneifolia Liebm. nom. illeg.; Quercus cuneifolia Raf.; Quercus nigrirhachis Trel.; Quercus obscurirhachis Trel.; Quercus pinalensis Trel.; Quercus synthetica Trel.; Quercus synthetica var. crenatifolia Trel.; Quercus texquitzinae Trel.

= Quercus glaucescens =

Species of oak tree

Quercus glaucescens is a species of oak endemic to Mexico.
