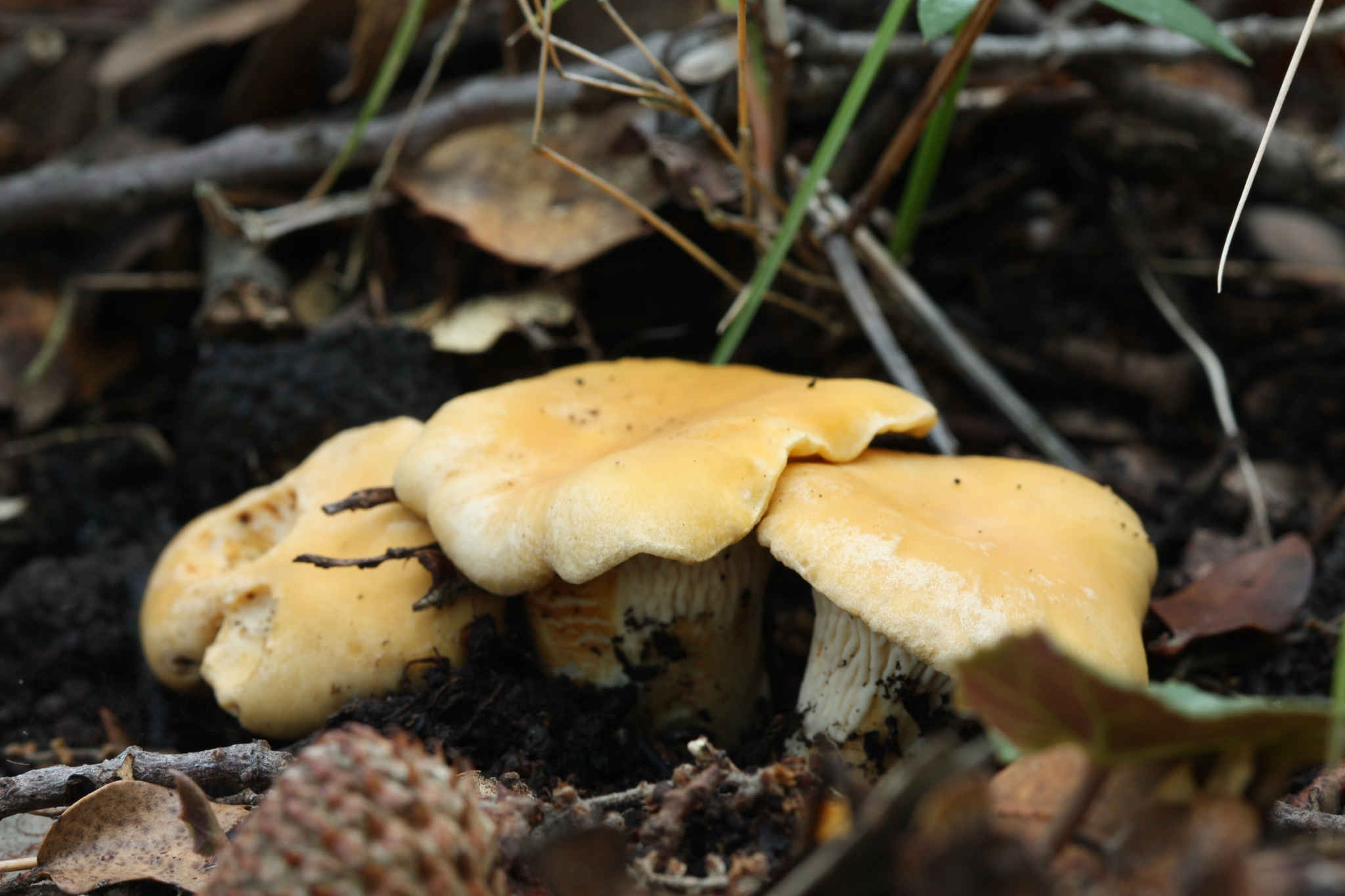

Conservation status
- Least Concern (IUCN 3.1)

Scientific classification
- Kingdom: Fungi
- Division: Basidiomycota
- Class: Agaricomycetes
- Order: Cantharellales
- Family: Cantharellaceae
- Genus: Cantharellus
- Species: C. ferruginascens

Binomial name
- Cantharellus ferruginascens P.D. Orton

= Cantharellus ferruginascens =

Species of fungus

Cantharellus ferruginascens is a species of Cantharellus found in Europe.
