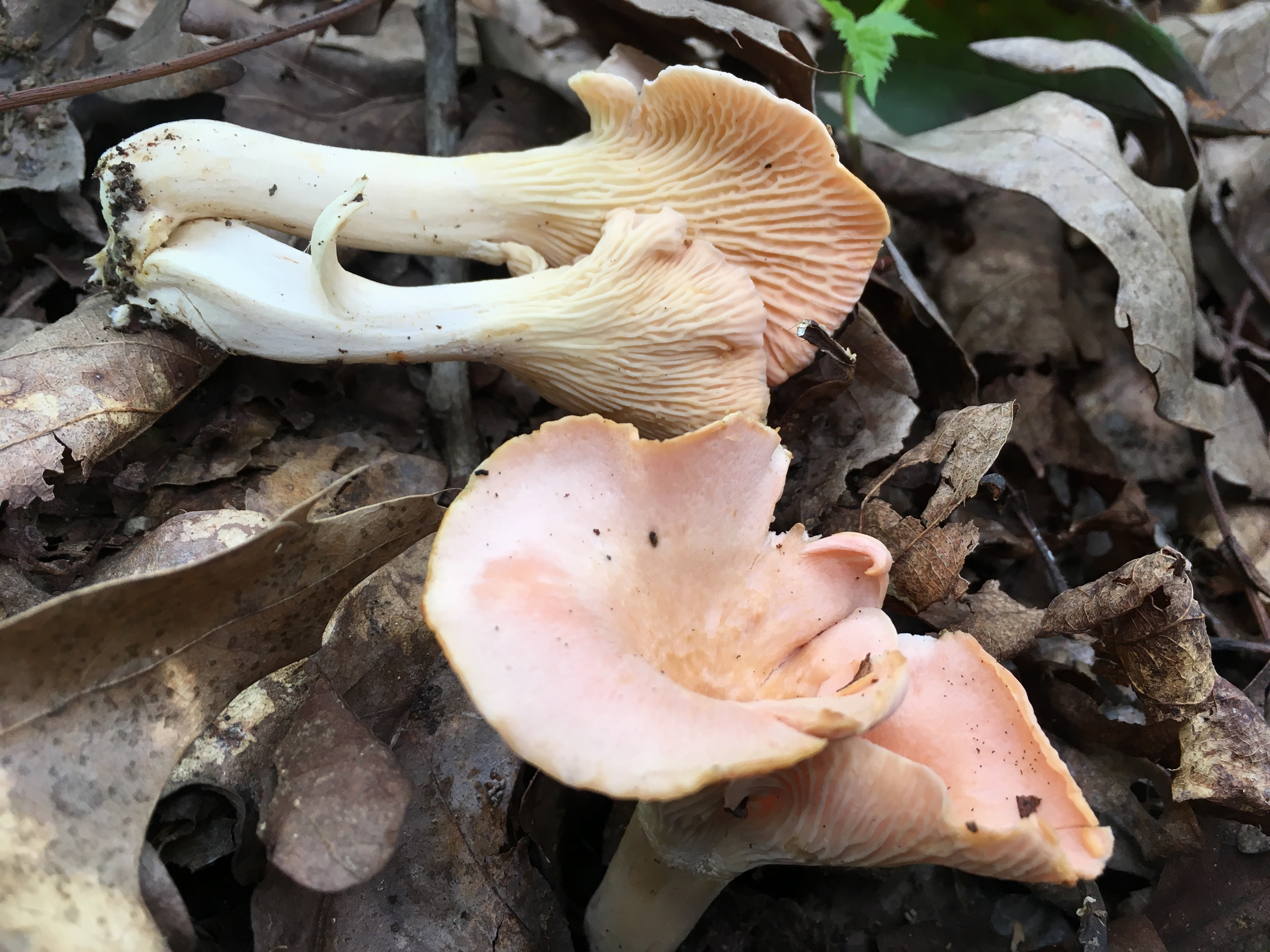

Conservation status
- Least Concern (IUCN 3.1)

Scientific classification
- Kingdom: Fungi
- Division: Basidiomycota
- Class: Agaricomycetes
- Order: Cantharellales
- Family: Cantharellaceae
- Genus: Cantharellus
- Species: C. velutinus

Binomial name
- Cantharellus velutinus Buyck & V. Hofst.

= Cantharellus velutinus =

Species of fungus

Cantharellus velutinus is a species of Cantharellus mushrooms found in North America.

== Description ==
This species is found in the Southern United States in pine forests.
