= Mushrooms Demystified =

- The cover of the first edition
- Author: David Arora
- Language: English
- Genre: Field guide
- Published: 1979
- Publisher: Ten Speed Press
- Publication place: United States
- Media type: Print (hardcover & paperback)
- ISBN: 9780898150094

Mushrooms Demystified: A Comprehensive Guide to the Fleshy Fungi is a mushroom field and identification guide by American mycologist David Arora, published in 1979 and republished in 1986. All That the Rain Promises and More…: A Hip Pocket Guide to Western Mushrooms, a "field companion" to Mushrooms Demystified with cross references to that volume was published in 1991.
