= Clavulina mussooriensis =

Scientific classification
- Domain: Eukaryota
- Kingdom: Fungi
- Division: Basidiomycota
- Class: Agaricomycetes
- Order: Cantharellales
- Family: Hydnaceae
- Genus: Clavulina
- Species: C. mussooriensis

Binomial name
- Clavulina mussooriensis Corner, K.S.Thind & Dev (1958)

Species of fungus

Clavulina mussooriensis is a species of coral fungus in the family Clavulinaceae. Fruit bodies, which measure up to 8 by 4.5 cm (3.1 by 1.8 in), grow either solitarily, in groups, or in clusters in soil. The type species was collected in a cedar forest in India. The species resembles Clavulina cinerea, but differs in its brown color and emergent hyphae.
