= Clavulina hispidulosa =

Scientific classification
- Domain: Eukaryota
- Kingdom: Fungi
- Division: Basidiomycota
- Class: Agaricomycetes
- Order: Cantharellales
- Family: Hydnaceae
- Genus: Clavulina
- Species: C. hispidulosa

Binomial name
- Clavulina hispidulosa Corner, K.S.Thind & Anand (1956)

Species of fungus

Clavulina hispidulosa is a species of coral fungus in the family Clavulinaceae. Described as new to science in 1956, it occurs in India.
