= Clavulina ramosior =

Scientific classification
- Domain: Eukaryota
- Kingdom: Fungi
- Division: Basidiomycota
- Class: Agaricomycetes
- Order: Cantharellales
- Family: Hydnaceae
- Genus: Clavulina
- Species: C. ramosior

Binomial name
- Clavulina ramosior (Corner) P.Roberts (1999)

Synonyms
- Clavulina cavipes var. ramosior Corner (1966)

Species of fungus

Clavulina ramosior is a species of coral fungus in the family Clavulinaceae. It occurs in Africa.
