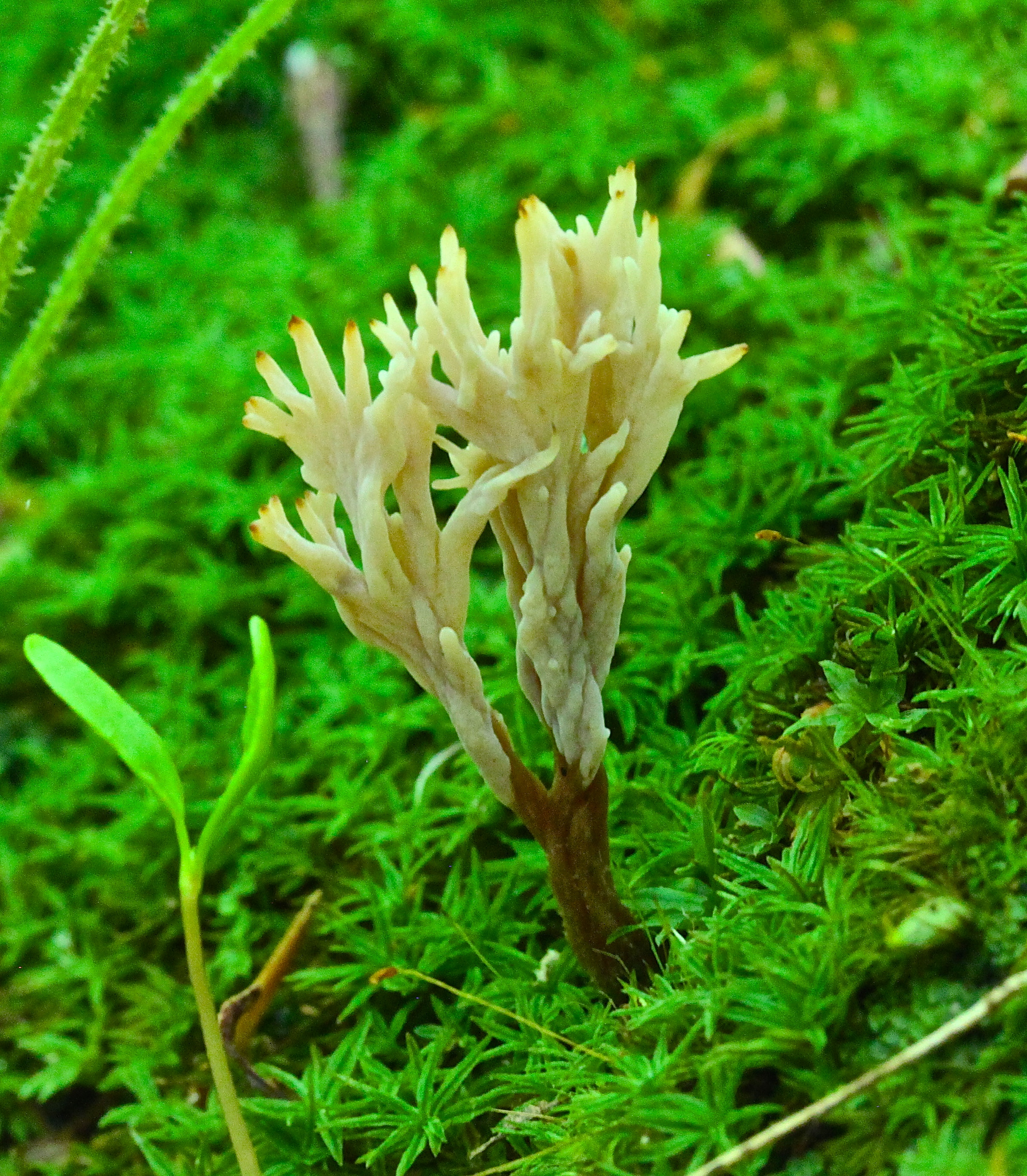

Scientific classification
- Kingdom: Fungi
- Division: Basidiomycota
- Class: Agaricomycetes
- Order: Cantharellales
- Family: Hydnaceae
- Genus: Clavulina
- Species: C. ornatipes

Binomial name
- Clavulina ornatipes Corner (1950)

Synonyms
- Clavaria ornatipes Peck (1908) Lachnocladium ornatipes (Peck) Burt (1922)

= Clavulina ornatipes =

Species of fungus

Clavulina ornatipes is a species of coral fungus in the family Clavulinaceae. First described as Clavaria ornatipes by Charles Horton Peck in 1908, it was transferred to Clavulina by E.J.H. Corner in 1950.
