= Clavulina sprucei =

Scientific classification
- Kingdom: Fungi
- Division: Basidiomycota
- Class: Agaricomycetes
- Order: Cantharellales
- Family: Hydnaceae
- Genus: Clavulina
- Species: C. sprucei

Binomial name
- Clavulina sprucei (Berk.) Corner (1950)

Synonyms
- Clavaria sprucei Berk. (1856)

Species of fungus

Clavulina sprucei is a species of coral fungus in the family Clavulinaceae. It is known from Guyana and Brazil.
