= Clavulina geoglossoides =

Scientific classification
- Domain: Eukaryota
- Kingdom: Fungi
- Division: Basidiomycota
- Class: Agaricomycetes
- Order: Cantharellales
- Family: Hydnaceae
- Genus: Clavulina
- Species: C. geoglossoides

Binomial name
- Clavulina geoglossoides Corner (1970)

Species of fungus

Clavulina geoglossoides is a species of coral fungus in the family Clavulinaceae. It occurs in New Zealand.
