= Clavulina puiggarii =

Scientific classification
- Domain: Eukaryota
- Kingdom: Fungi
- Division: Basidiomycota
- Class: Agaricomycetes
- Order: Cantharellales
- Family: Hydnaceae
- Genus: Clavulina
- Species: C. puiggarii

Binomial name
- Clavulina puiggarii (Speg.) Corner

Synonyms
- Clavaria puiggarii Speg. (1881); Clavulinopsis puiggarii (Speg.) Corner (1950)

Species of fungus

Clavulina puiggarii is a species of coral fungus in the family Clavulinaceae. It is found in Australia and Brazil.
