= Clavulina gracilis =

Scientific classification
- Domain: Eukaryota
- Kingdom: Fungi
- Division: Basidiomycota
- Class: Agaricomycetes
- Order: Cantharellales
- Family: Hydnaceae
- Genus: Clavulina
- Species: C. gracilis

Binomial name
- Clavulina gracilis Corner (1950)

Species of fungus

Clavulina gracilis is a species of coral fungus in the family Clavulinaceae. It was described by E.J.H. Corner in 1950.
