= Clavulina wisoli =

Scientific classification
- Domain: Eukaryota
- Kingdom: Fungi
- Division: Basidiomycota
- Class: Agaricomycetes
- Order: Cantharellales
- Family: Hydnaceae
- Genus: Clavulina
- Species: C. wisoli

Binomial name
- Clavulina wisoli R.H.Petersen (2003)

Synonyms
- Clavulina albiramea (Corner) Buyck & Duhem (2007)

Species of fungus

Clavulina wisoli is a species of coral fungus in the family Clavulinaceae. Officially described in 2003, it is found in Africa.
