= Clavulina delicia =

Scientific classification
- Kingdom: Fungi
- Division: Basidiomycota
- Class: Agaricomycetes
- Order: Cantharellales
- Family: Hydnaceae
- Genus: Clavulina
- Species: C. delicia

Binomial name
- Clavulina delicia (Berk.) Corner (1950)

Synonyms
- Clavaria delicia Berk. (1856); Lachnocladium delicia (Berk.) Cooke (1891)

Species of fungus

Clavulina delicia is a species of fungus in the family Clavulinaceae. Originally named Clavaria delicia by Miles Joseph Berkeley in 1856, it was transferred to Clavulina in 1950 by British botanist E.J.H. Corner. It occurs in South America.
