= Clavulina floridana =

Scientific classification
- Kingdom: Fungi
- Division: Basidiomycota
- Class: Agaricomycetes
- Order: Cantharellales
- Family: Hydnaceae
- Genus: Clavulina
- Species: C. floridana

Binomial name
- Clavulina floridana (Singer) Corner (1950)

Synonyms
- Clavaria floridana Singer (1945)

Species of fungus

Clavulina floridana is a species of fungus in the family Clavulinaceae. It was originally described by Rolf Singer as Clavaria floridana in 1945, then E.J.H. Corner transferred it to Clavulina in 1950.Clavulina floridana is considered a Neotropical coral fungus, typically found growing in humid tropical environments. It has been observed growing on the forest floors on top of decaying trees and branches. During the summer months, the humidity that comes from decaying leaves, twigs, and other organic material helps make the fungus thrive. Like other members of its genus, Clavulina, it has the characteristic of having coral-like branches which extend up form the ground. These branches have apexes that are typically lighter than the rest of the body. The fungus reproduces sexually through sexual structures called basidiospores. These are characteristically known for being club-shaped and for having cells called basidia. The microscopic spores are released into the environment with a mechanism that with a Buller’s drop it gets launched into the air and dispersed. It is also responsible for helping several species of trees to receive nutrients and they in return receive resources that they would otherwise struggle to get.

== Taxonomy/Phylogeny ==
Clavulina floridana is within the Basidiomycota division of fungi. Basidiomycota are commonly known for the various species of jelly fungi and stinkhorns among others. They are characterized as being filamentous and composed of hyphae with some exceptions. The Agaricomyces within the Basidiomycota refers to a class that forms hymenial layers on their fruiting bodies. The order is Cantharellales is often known for containing fungi that are important plant pathogens with a large diversity of pertaining to the morphologies of the species within it. The family Clavulinaceae is identifies as being a group with “simple clubs, flattened or compressed forms, or intricately branched coralloid fruitbodies”. All of these classifications are what helped to accurately classify the species C. floridana accurately.

The name Clavulina comes from the Latin word clava, which means club. This structure is called the basidia and is related to the shape of the fungi structures, which appear to have a club-shaped morphology. The second half of the name, floridana, signifies that the species is belonging to Florida which traces back to its discovery in 1945 by Rolf Singer. This was described in detail in the scientific journal “Mycologia”, Volume 37, Issue 4 (1945). Where the article named “New and interesting species of Basidiomycetes”. The fungi species was described as, “Carpophores very cespitose (from afar sometimes like a gray turf) but the bases not connate through often fasciculate, simple or forked below or more often above, rarely almost crested as in Clavulina cristata, very rarely. 2- to 6-branched, very frequently compressed, or canaliculate, with acute tips, the larger upper fertile part cinereous when fresh, dark cinereous when dried, the lower part sterile, yellowish white or whitish yellow, yellowish when dried, the fertile and the sterile parts very abruptly and distinctly delimited, mostly about 2-3 micrometers. Broad in the fertile part, rarely up to 5 micrometers in diameter...” The exact quotation of the description done by Singer in 1945 is incredibly similar to what is seen and written about still.

The family name was recently changed in the newer data bases. It had been previously categorized as part of the Hydnaceae previously, but the NZOR fungal database and the Biotaof of New Zealand both classify C. floridana as part of Clavulinaceae. It was originally collected in Dade County, Florida in 1945 by the mycologist Rolf Singer and was first named Clavaria floridana. This name was then changed in 1950 to a better fitting name by E.J.H. Corner, who changed the name to Clavulina floridana. This usually occurs when scientist discover a change in the previously thought microscopic or structural characteristics of the fungus. This species has no common name that is used and the descriptions that are used when talking about the fungi is usually pertaining to the general shape.

Research pertaining to this fungus has been conducted by the UNAM, or the Universidad Nacional Autonoma de Mexico, who analyzed 3 DNA regions of the fungi which included the ITS region, 28S rDNA region, and the RPB2 region. They conducted a reevaluation of the information that was previously known about this fungus. The study contained samples from three provinces in Mexico and one tropical province in the United States. A lot of the species of this fungi could go unnoticed due to how small and rare it is to notice this species if not looking for it. The research led to the discovery of two new species of Clavulina: Clavulina arboreiparva and Clavulina tuxflasana. These could most likely be considered the closest relatives to C. floridana since they were found alongside this species. They also share similar features to C. floridana such as its environmental needs, structural, and genetic traits.

== Morphology ==
C. floridana is known for having a fruiting body that is coral-like in shape and grey-ish in color. The branches are thin and long with a free-flowing form. The branches are known for being longer than the body and it has been stated that some might even have a small resemblance to some kinds of jelly fungi. The fruiting bodies are coralloid and about 20-60 micrometers in length. The appearance is branched and forms open clusters. The tip or apex of the branches are rounded and are typically lighter in color from the rest of the body. The branches are also brittle enough to be easily broken with little force. The location where the species was found is also helpful when trying to correctly determine if it’s being correctly identified since it is usually found in tropical climates such as parts of Mexico and Florida among others. Another important distinction is the different phylogenetic markers that were recently researched and found to be of major significance when trying to determine between the different Clavulina species. This species is known for having basidiospores which are larger than the average length of 5-15 micrometers that is typically seen in this group. These reproduce sexually through meiosis which means that each spore is genetically unique. The basidiospores develop on cells that are called basidia. The dispersal of spores is due to the ballistospores which have a launching mechanism as soon as the tiniest water droplet makes contact with the surface. The term for this water droplet is Buller’s drop. When the spore lands on a desired surface it forms a web-like structure called hyphae which makes up the mycelium and will eventually grow to become the new fungi.

== Ecology ==
The Clavulina floridana has mutualistic symbiotic relationships with living trees. This means that it is ectomycorrhizal (ECM). The ‘ecto’ means outside and the ‘mycorrhizal’ means root fungus. This signals to the type of relationship that is produced by these types of fungi. It wraps around the outside of the living plant’s root tips instead of going within the actual cells. The fungi lack the ability to produce their own energy due to their lack of chlorophyll, so they have to join together with plants to “trade” resources with them. C. floridana is known for usually pairing up with pine and oak trees. They typically anchor themselves to either the Tropical Hardwoods or the Southern Pines. C. floridana is considered to be a symbiont which means that it cooperates with another living organism to receive energy. The plant gives the fungus carbon and the fungus gives the plant water. The fungus is typically found on the ground during the summer and near decaying twigs and leaves. This provides for the right amount of moisture needed for the fungus to survive and thrive. The mycelium remains attached to the tree while engulfing decaying plants. The geographical region of this fungus has been widespread to neotropical environments such as Florida, Mexico, and Brazil. There is also no clear data showing whether the species found in some of the far-away places are this species or if they’re just morphologically similar to it.

== Overall Biology and Relevance to Humans ==
The fungus is not considered to be economically important to humans at the moment. There has not been sufficient research conducted to determine if there could be a market for selling them, whether it be for potential medicinal qualities or just for consumption. The fungus aids with the exchange of nutrients with plants, specifically with oaks and pine trees, which can be incredibly important to regions where there is a large density of those plants in forests or heavily wooded areas. There is also not a lot of genetic data apart from the article done in a university in Mexico which conducted research on various species from Mexico and one from Florida. This fungus also does not seem to have any cultural relevance for human history since there has not been much mention of it since the article written and the descriptions in journals that contributed to the naming of the fungi. A part of the cellular biology that was discovered is that the genus Clavulina has stichic basidia, which means that they have stichic nuclear division where the first meiotic division happens in the middle of the basidium and the mitotic spindles line up parallel to the long axis of the cell. This is what differentiates the Clavulina. There was an experiment that was based on how to determine the identity of Clavulina using iron salts as indicators. The experiment used Clavulina and Ramaria, which is a coral fungus that looks alike, and when exposed to the iron salts the Ramaria turned a dark green while the Clavulina was indifferent.
