= Clavulina craterelloides =

Scientific classification
- Kingdom: Fungi
- Division: Basidiomycota
- Class: Agaricomycetes
- Order: Cantharellales
- Family: Hydnaceae
- Genus: Clavulina
- Species: C. craterelloides

Binomial name
- Clavulina craterelloides Thacker & T.W.Henkel (2004)

Species of fungus

Clavulina craterelloides is a species of coral fungus in the family Clavulinaceae. Known only from Guyana, it was described in 2004. The fruit bodies are large, orange-brown in color, and funnel-shaped, occurring in groves of Dicymbe trees.
