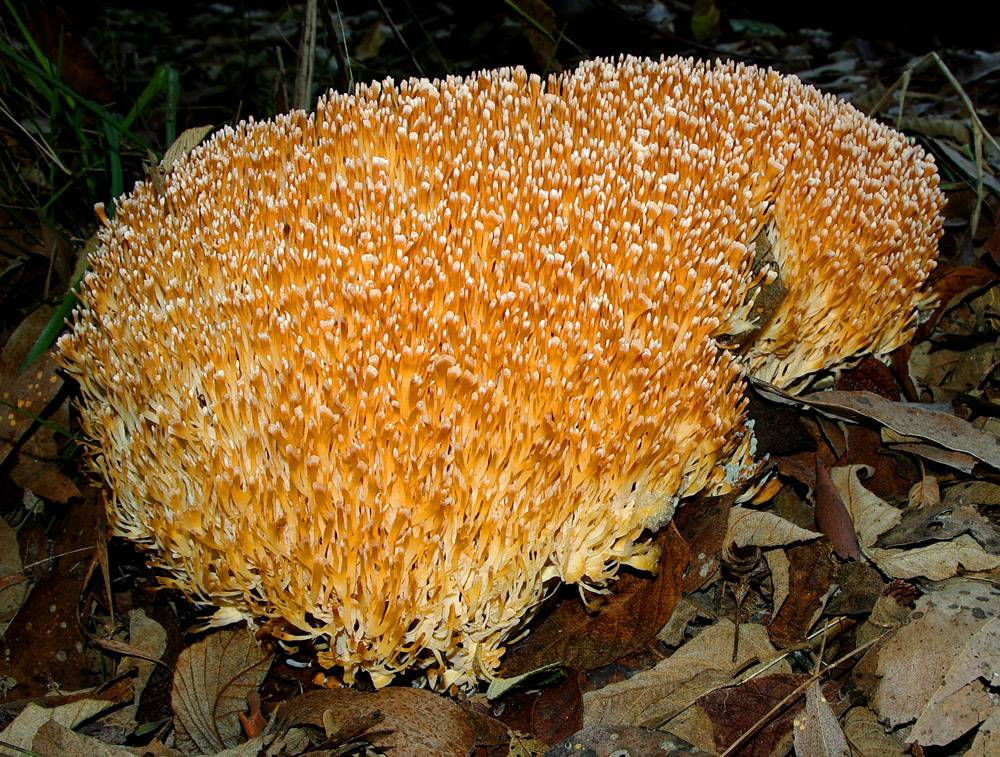
- Aphelaria species, possibly Aphelaria complanata

Scientific classification
- Kingdom: Fungi
- Division: Basidiomycota
- Class: Agaricomycetes
- Order: Cantharellales
- Family: Aphelariaceae; Corner (1970)

Type genus
- Aphelaria Corner (1950)

Genera
- Aphelaria; Phaeoaphelaria; Tumidapexus

= Aphelariaceae =

Family of fungi

The Aphelariaceae are a family of fungi in the order Cantharellales. The family contains a small group of tropical and subtropical clavarioid fungi, but is not well characterized and has not been the subject of published research.

== Taxonomy ==
The family was described in 1970 by British mycologist E.J.H. Corner to accommodate species of club and coral fungi that were similar to species in the Clavariaceae, but whose context hyphae were uninflated. As well as the genus Aphelaria, Corner included the small genera Corticirama, Phaeoaphelaria, and Tumidapexus within the Aphelariaceae. No research has been published on the family, though several standard reference works have recognized the Aphelariaceae, placed it within the order Cantharellales, and moved the genus Corticirama elsewhere, though the basis for these dispositions is unclear.

== Habitat and distribution ==
Members of the Aphelariaceae (excluding Corticirama) are terrestrial and typically found in woodland, but it is not known whether they are saprotrophic (litter-rotting) or ectomycorrhizal. Just over 20 species are currently placed within the family, most of them from the tropics and subtropics, extending southwards into temperate regions (New Zealand).

== See also ==
- List of Basidiomycota families
