= Clavulina amazonensis =

Scientific classification
- Domain: Eukaryota
- Kingdom: Fungi
- Division: Basidiomycota
- Class: Agaricomycetes
- Order: Cantharellales
- Family: Hydnaceae
- Genus: Clavulina
- Species: C. amazonensis

Binomial name
- Clavulina amazonensis Corner (1970)

Species of fungus

Clavulina amazonensis is a species of fungus in the family Clavulinaceae. Found in South America (Venezuela, Brazil, and Guyana), it was described by British mycologist E.J.H. Corner in 1970.
