= Clavulina arcuatus =

Scientific classification
- Kingdom: Fungi
- Division: Basidiomycota
- Class: Agaricomycetes
- Order: Cantharellales
- Family: Hydnaceae
- Genus: Clavulina
- Species: C. arcuatus

Binomial name
- Clavulina arcuatus Douanla-Meli (2007)

Species of fungus

Clavulina arcuatus is a species of coral fungus in the family Clavulinaceae. Found in Cameroon, it was described in 2007.
