= Clavulina amethystinoides =

Scientific classification
- Domain: Eukaryota
- Kingdom: Fungi
- Division: Basidiomycota
- Class: Agaricomycetes
- Order: Cantharellales
- Family: Hydnaceae
- Genus: Clavulina
- Species: C. amethystinoides

Binomial name
- Clavulina amethystinoides (Peck) Corner (1950)

Synonyms
- Clavaria amethystinoides Peck (1907)

Species of fungus

Clavulina amethystinoides is a species of fungus in the family Clavulinaceae. It was originally named Clavaria amethystinoides by American mycologist Charles Horton Peck in 1907; E.J.H. Corner transferred it to Clavulina in 1950.
