= Clavulina brunneocinerea =

Scientific classification
- Domain: Eukaryota
- Kingdom: Fungi
- Division: Basidiomycota
- Class: Agaricomycetes
- Order: Cantharellales
- Family: Hydnaceae
- Genus: Clavulina
- Species: C. brunneocinerea

Binomial name
- Clavulina brunneocinerea R.H.Petersen (1988)

Species of fungus

Clavulina brunneocinerea is a species of coral fungus in the family Clavulinaceae. It occurs in New Zealand.
