= Clavulina purpurea =

Scientific classification
- Domain: Eukaryota
- Kingdom: Fungi
- Division: Basidiomycota
- Class: Agaricomycetes
- Order: Cantharellales
- Family: Hydnaceae
- Genus: Clavulina
- Species: C. purpurea

Binomial name
- Clavulina purpurea R.H.Petersen (1988)

Species of fungus

Clavulina purpurea is a species of coral fungus in the family Clavulinaceae. The purple fruit bodies are up to 17 by 4.5 cm (6.7 by 1.8 in). It occurs in New Zealand.
