= Clavulina viridula =

Scientific classification
- Kingdom: Fungi
- Division: Basidiomycota
- Class: Agaricomycetes
- Order: Cantharellales
- Family: Hydnaceae
- Genus: Clavulina
- Species: C. viridula

Binomial name
- Clavulina viridula (Bres.) D.A.Reid (1962)

Synonyms
- Thelephora viridula Bres. (1907)

Species of fungus

Clavulina viridula is a species of coral fungus belonging to the family Clavulinaceae. Originally described from Java as Thelephora viridula by Italian mycologist Giacomo Bresadola in 1907, it was transferred to the genus Clavulina by Derek Reid in 1962.
