= Clavulina kunmudlutsa =

Scientific classification
- Kingdom: Fungi
- Division: Basidiomycota
- Class: Agaricomycetes
- Order: Cantharellales
- Family: Hydnaceae
- Genus: Clavulina
- Species: C. kunmudlutsa

Binomial name
- Clavulina kunmudlutsa T.W.Henkel & Aime 2011

Species of fungus

Clavulina kunmudlutsa is a species of coral fungus in the family Clavulinaceae. It is known only from Guyana. The specific epithet kunmudlutsa is the vernacular name applied to this fungus by the Patamona people, who collect it as an edible species.
