= Clavulina nigricans =

Scientific classification
- Kingdom: Fungi
- Division: Basidiomycota
- Class: Agaricomycetes
- Order: Cantharellales
- Family: Hydnaceae
- Genus: Clavulina
- Species: C. nigricans

Binomial name
- Clavulina nigricans Thacker & T.W.Henkel (2004)

Species of fungus

Clavulina nigricans is a species of coral fungus in the family Clavulinaceae. It produces large, highly branched black fruit bodies that measure 12–19 cm (4.7–7.5 in) tall by 9–13.5 cm (3.5–5.3 in) wide. It is found only in Guyana.
