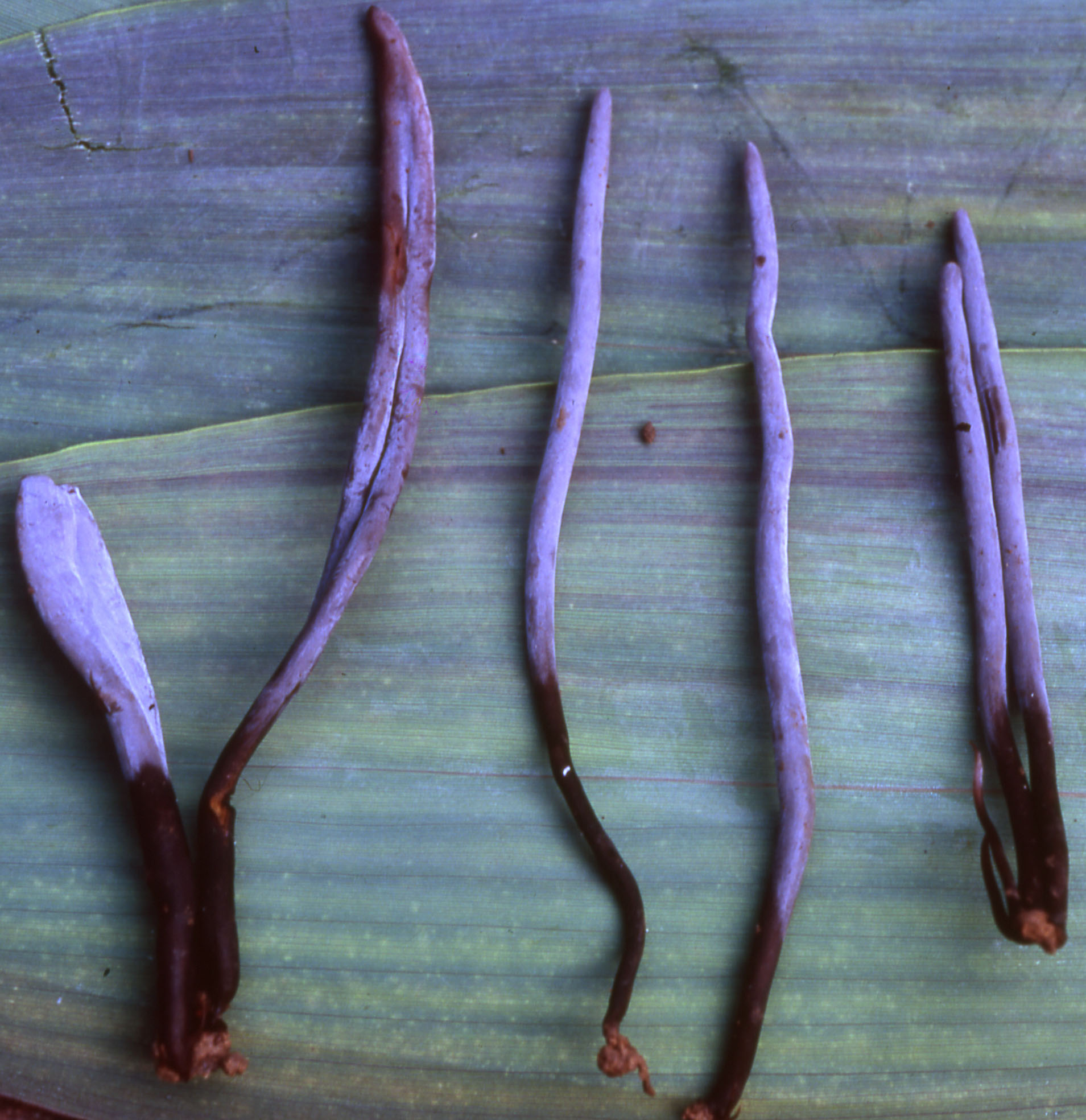

Scientific classification
- Kingdom: Fungi
- Division: Basidiomycota
- Class: Agaricomycetes
- Order: Cantharellales
- Family: Hydnaceae
- Genus: Clavulina
- Species: C. dicymbetorum

Binomial name
- Clavulina dicymbetorum T.W.Henkel, Meszaros & Aime (2005)

= Clavulina dicymbetorum =

Species of fungus

Clavulina dicymbetorum is a species of coral fungus in the family Clavulinaceae. Described as new to science in 2005, it occurs in Guyana.
