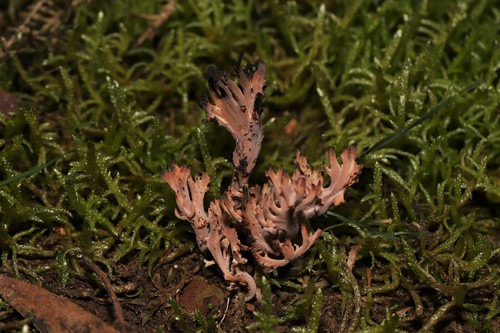

Scientific classification
- Domain: Eukaryota
- Kingdom: Fungi
- Division: Basidiomycota
- Class: Agaricomycetes
- Order: Cantharellales
- Family: Hydnaceae
- Genus: Clavulina
- Species: C. vinaceocervina

Binomial name
- Clavulina vinaceocervina (Cleland)Corner

Synonyms
- Clavaria vinaceocervina Cleland

= Clavulina vinaceocervina =

Species of fungus

Clavulina vinaceocervina, the dark-tipped coral, is a species of coral fungus belonging to the genus Clavulina.

== Taxonomy ==
The species name vinaceocervina is a combination of "vinaceo", from the Latin word which means wine-coloured and "cervina" from the Latin word which means of or pertaining to a deer. It was originally described and classified as Clavaria vinaceo-cervina by Australian mycologist John Burton Cleland in 1931 and was reclassified as a species of Clavulina in 1950 by E. J. H. Corner.

Clavulina vinaceocervina contains the following varieties:

- Clavulina vinaceocervina var. vinaceocervina
- Clavulina vinaceocervina var. avellanea

== Description ==
Clavulina vinaceocervina is around 5 centimetres (2.0 in) high, with a short trunk with irregular branches that have prong-like divisions divided into a number of small branchlets. The branchlets are short, prong-like, and blunt, sometimes acute, thornlike, or digitate. The branches can be irregularly flattened and rugose. They are often slender but can be stouter and knobby. The colour can be reddish-brown to fawn, with a reddish-pink colour at the tips. The spores are smooth and roundish (subglobose). They measure 7.5–10 × 6.5–8.8 μm.

Clavulina vinaceocervina can be mistaken for the species Ramariopsis ramarioides.

== Habitat ==
Clavulina vinaceocervina can be found on the ground under trees in Southern Australia.
