= Clavulina humicola =

Scientific classification
- Kingdom: Fungi
- Division: Basidiomycota
- Class: Agaricomycetes
- Order: Cantharellales
- Family: Hydnaceae
- Genus: Clavulina
- Species: C. humicola

Binomial name
- Clavulina humicola T.W.Henkel, Meszaros & Aime (2005)

Species of fungus

Clavulina humicola is a species of coral fungus in the family Clavulinaceae. It occurs in Guyana.
