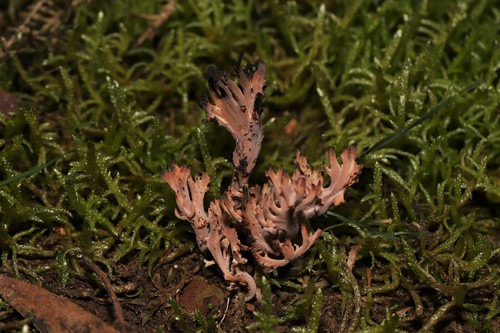

Scientific classification
- Kingdom: Fungi
- Division: Basidiomycota
- Class: Agaricomycetes
- Order: Cantharellales
- Family: Hydnaceae
- Genus: Clavulina
- Species: C. vinaceocervina Cleland
- Variety: C. v. var. vinaceocervina

Trinomial name
- Clavulina vinaceocervina var. vinaceocervina

= Clavulina vinaceocervina var. vinaceocervina =

Variety of fungus

Clavulina vinaceocervina var. vinaceocervina is a variety of the Clavulina vinaceocervina species. The knowledge regarding this variety is currently limited. The other variety of this species is Clavulina vinaceocervina var. avellanea.

== Etymology ==
Vinaceo, from the Latin word which means wine-coloured.

Cervina, from the Latin word which means of or pertaining to a deer.
