= Clavulina alutaceosiccescens =

Scientific classification
- Domain: Eukaryota
- Kingdom: Fungi
- Division: Basidiomycota
- Class: Agaricomycetes
- Order: Cantharellales
- Family: Hydnaceae
- Genus: Clavulina
- Species: C. alutaceosiccescens

Binomial name
- Clavulina alutaceosiccescens R.H.Petersen (1988)

Species of fungus

Clavulina alutaceosiccescens is a species of fungus in the family Clavulinaceae. It occurs in New Zealand. The fruit bodies resemble whitish clubs with one or two simple branches, and measure up to 28 mm tall by 2 mm wide. The roughly spherical to broadly egg-shaped spores are 8.3–9.4 by 6.8–8.3 μm.
