= Clavulina tepurumenga =

Scientific classification
- Kingdom: Fungi
- Division: Basidiomycota
- Class: Agaricomycetes
- Order: Cantharellales
- Family: Hydnaceae
- Genus: Clavulina
- Species: C. tepurumenga

Binomial name
- Clavulina tepurumenga T.W.Henkel & Aime (2011)

Species of fungus

Clavulina tepurumenga is a species of fungus in the family Clavulinaceae. Found in Guyana, it was described as new to science in 2010.
