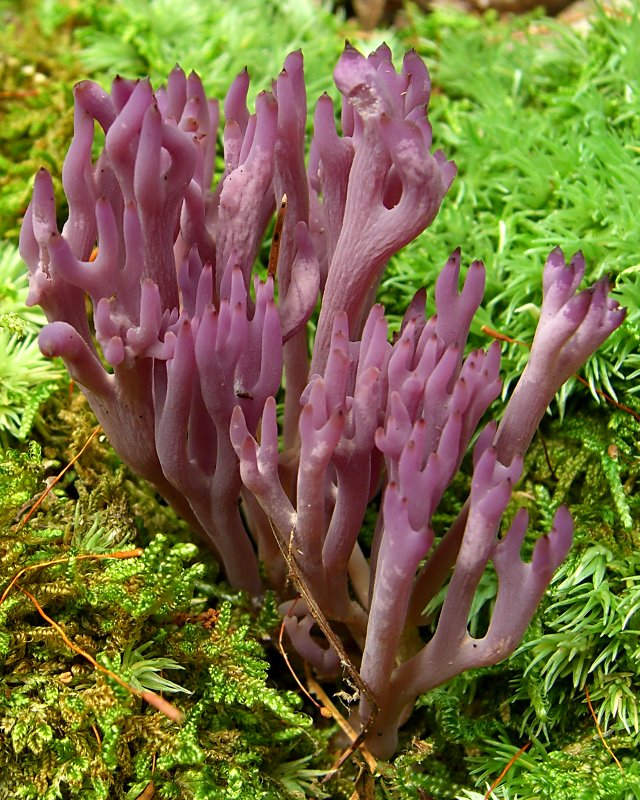

Scientific classification
- Domain: Eukaryota
- Kingdom: Fungi
- Division: Basidiomycota
- Class: Agaricomycetes
- Order: Cantharellales
- Family: Hydnaceae
- Genus: Clavulina
- Species: C. amethystina

Binomial name
- Clavulina amethystina (Bull.) Donk (1933)

Synonyms
- Clavaria purpurea Schaeff. (1774); Clavaria amethystina Bull. (1791); Clavaria amethystina Bull. (1791); Ramaria amethystina (Bull.) Gray (1821)

= Clavulina amethystina =

Species of fungus

Clavulina amethystina is a species of coral fungus in the family Clavulinaceae.
