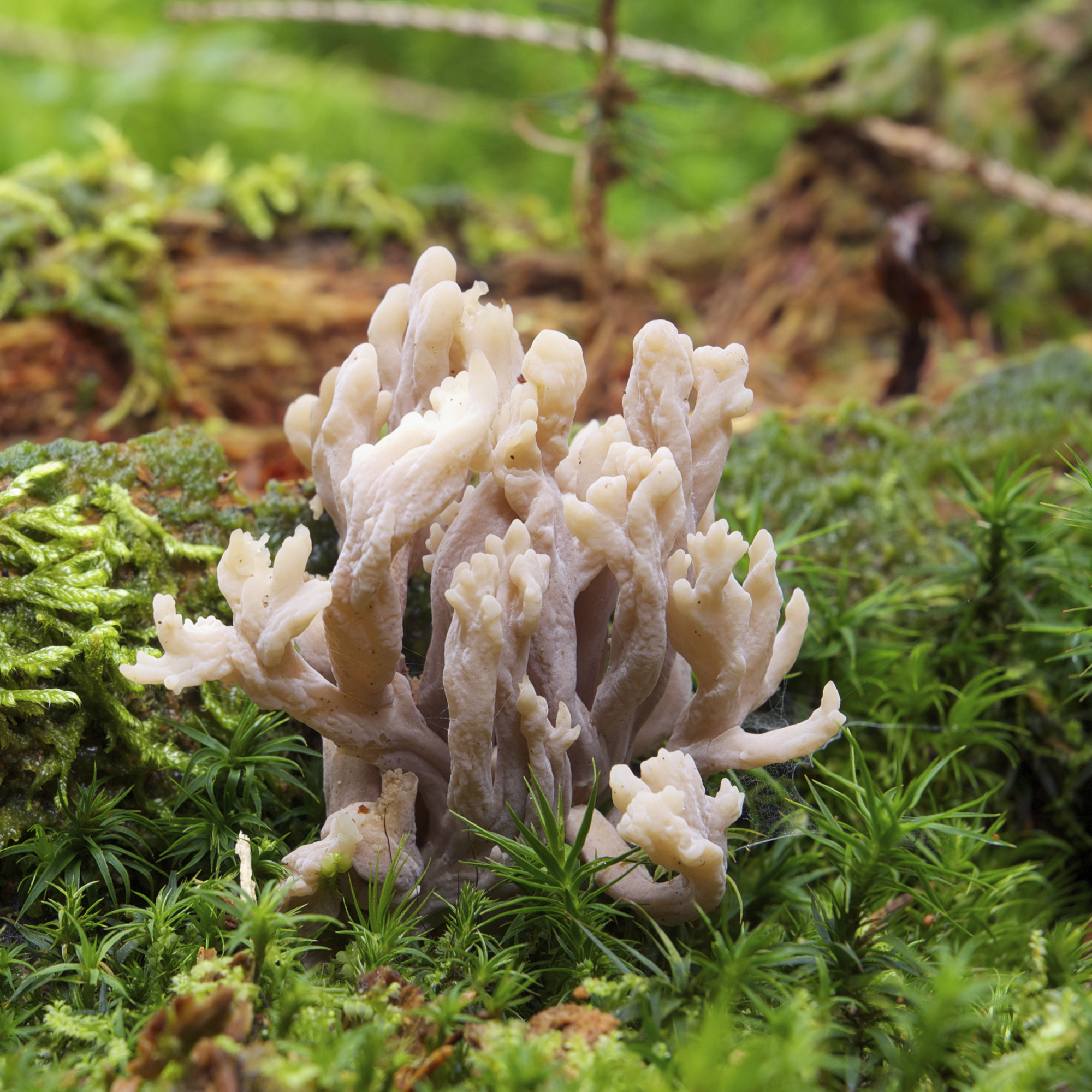

Scientific classification
- Domain: Eukaryota
- Kingdom: Fungi
- Division: Basidiomycota
- Class: Agaricomycetes
- Order: Cantharellales
- Family: Hydnaceae
- Genus: Clavulina
- Species: C. rugosa

Binomial name
- Clavulina rugosa (Bull.) J.Schröt. (1888)

Synonyms
- Clavaria rugosa Bull. (1790); Ramaria rugosa (Bull.) Gray (1821); Clavaria herveyi Peck (1893)

= Clavulina rugosa =

Species of fungus

Clavulina rugosa, commonly known as the wrinkled coral fungus, is a species of coral fungus in the family Clavulinaceae. It is edible.

== Taxonomy ==
The species was originally described as Clavaria rugosa by Jean Bulliard in 1790. It was transferred to Clavulina by Joseph Schröter in 1888.

== Description ==
It grows up to 12 centimetres (4 3/4 in) tall and varies in width.

== Distribution and habitat ==
It can be found in Europe, growing near wooded paths from August to November.

== Uses ==
One field guide lists it as edible when cooked.
