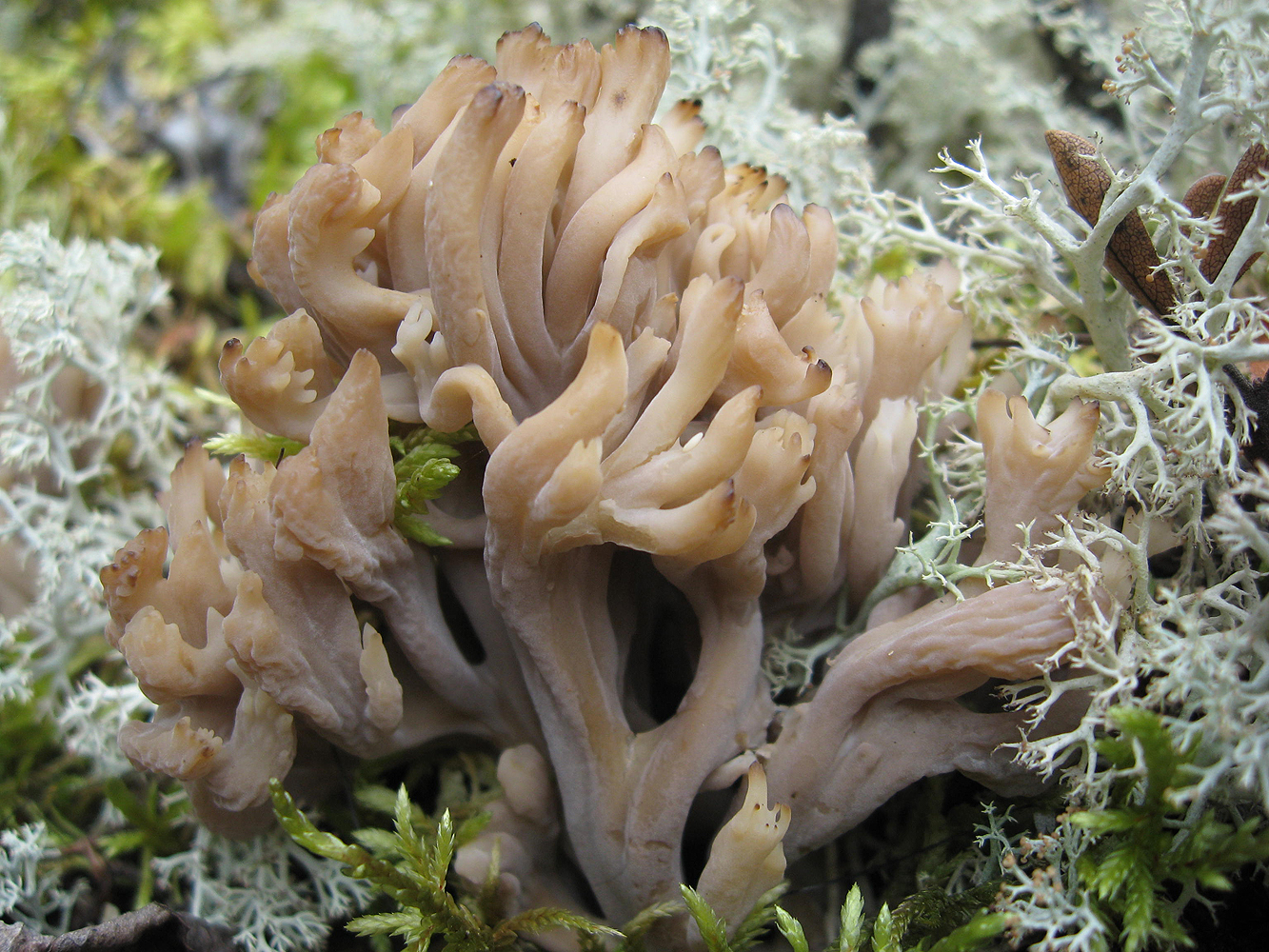

Scientific classification
- Kingdom: Fungi
- Division: Basidiomycota
- Class: Agaricomycetes
- Order: Cantharellales
- Family: Hydnaceae
- Genus: Clavulina
- Species: C. cristata

Binomial name
- Clavulina cristata (Holmsk.) J. Schröt.

Synonyms
- Clavulina coralloides (L.) J. Schröt.; Clavaria coralloides L., 1753; Clavaria elegans Bolton 1789

= Clavulina cristata =

Species of fungus

Clavulina cristata
- Mycological characteristics
- Smooth hymenium
- No distinct cap
- Stipe is bare
- Spore print is white
- Ecology is saprotrophic or mycorrhizal
- Edibility is edible

Clavulina cristata, commonly known as the wrinkled coral fungus, white coral fungus or the crested coral fungus, is a white- or light-colored edible coral mushroom present in temperate areas of the Americas and Europe. It is the type species of the genus Clavulina.

== Taxonomy ==
The commonly used species name cristata was coined in 1790 by Danish mycologist Theodor Holmskjold (as Ramaria cristata). However, Carl Linnaeus described apparently the same fungus as Clavaria coralloides in his Species Plantarum in 1753. Therefore, according to the International Code of Nomenclature for algae, fungi, and plants, the name Clavulina coralloides should be used in preference to Clavulina cristata, although the latter name is in more common use.

== Description ==
The fruit bodies, which are generally white- to cream-colored, can be up to 8 centimetres (3 1/8 in) tall, and 2.5–4 cm (1–1 5/8 in) broad. The coral "arms" are sparingly branched (3–4 times), 2–4 mm wide, smooth, and sometimes wrinkled longitudinally. The tips are cristate, having small pointed projections, and will often darken with age or in dry weather. The stems vary in form and can be 5–40 mm (1/4–1 1/2 in) long and 5–20 mm wide. The fruit bodies have no distinctive odor, and a mild taste.

The fruit bodies may have a darker color either due to natural variation (whereby the appearance of this species may approach and be confused with C. cinerea) or because of infection by a microscopic fungus, Helminthosphaeria clavariarum.

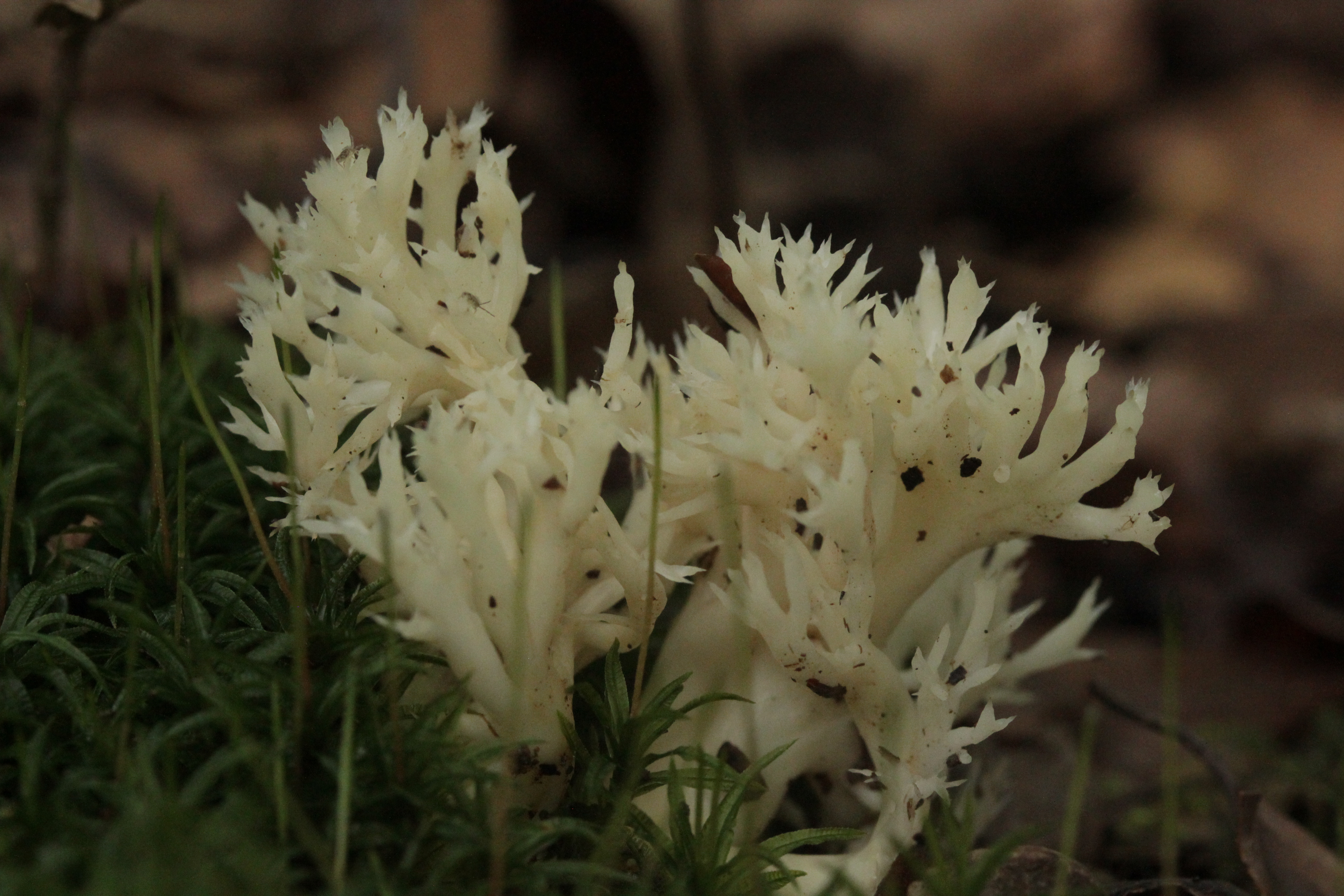

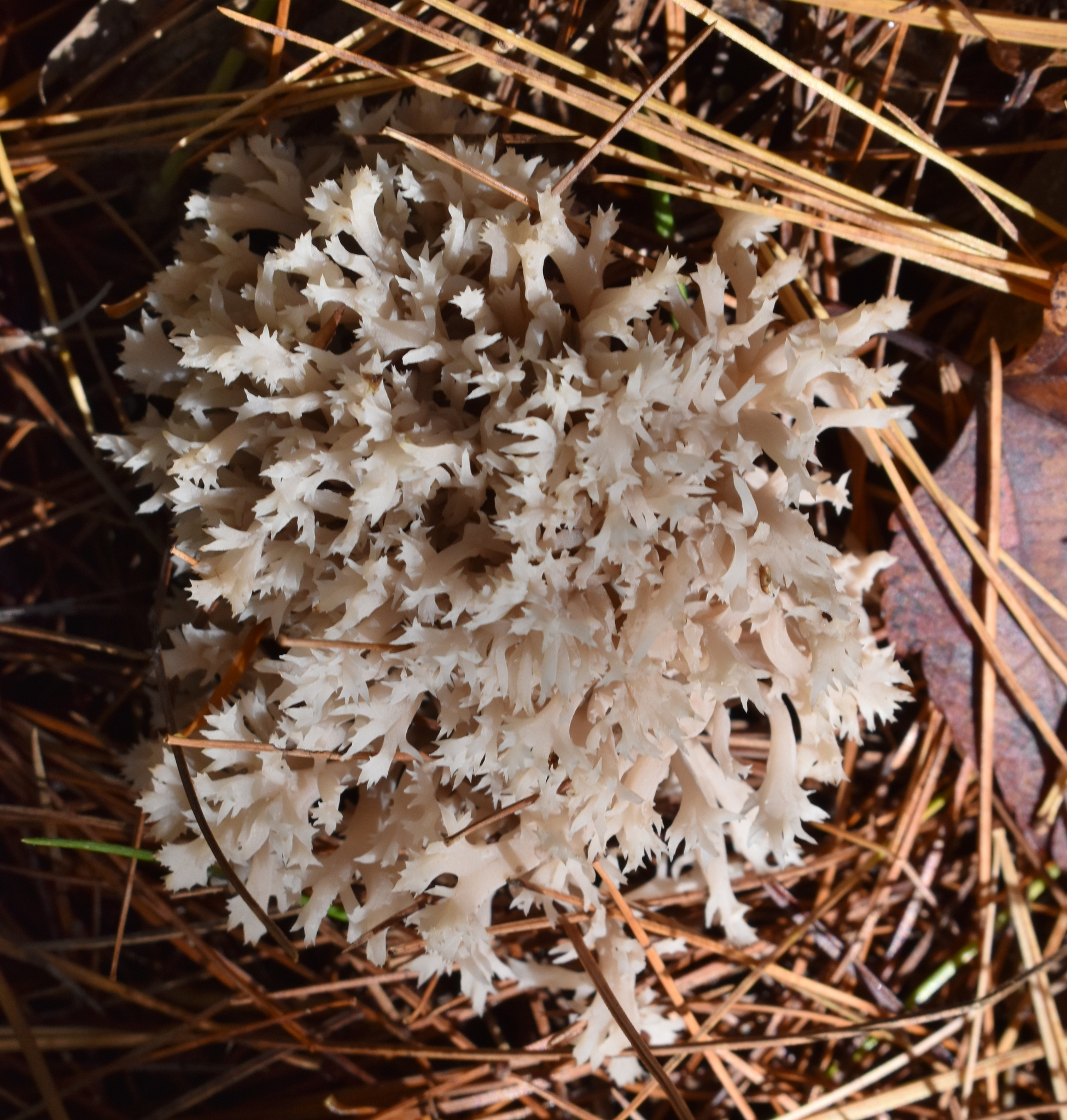

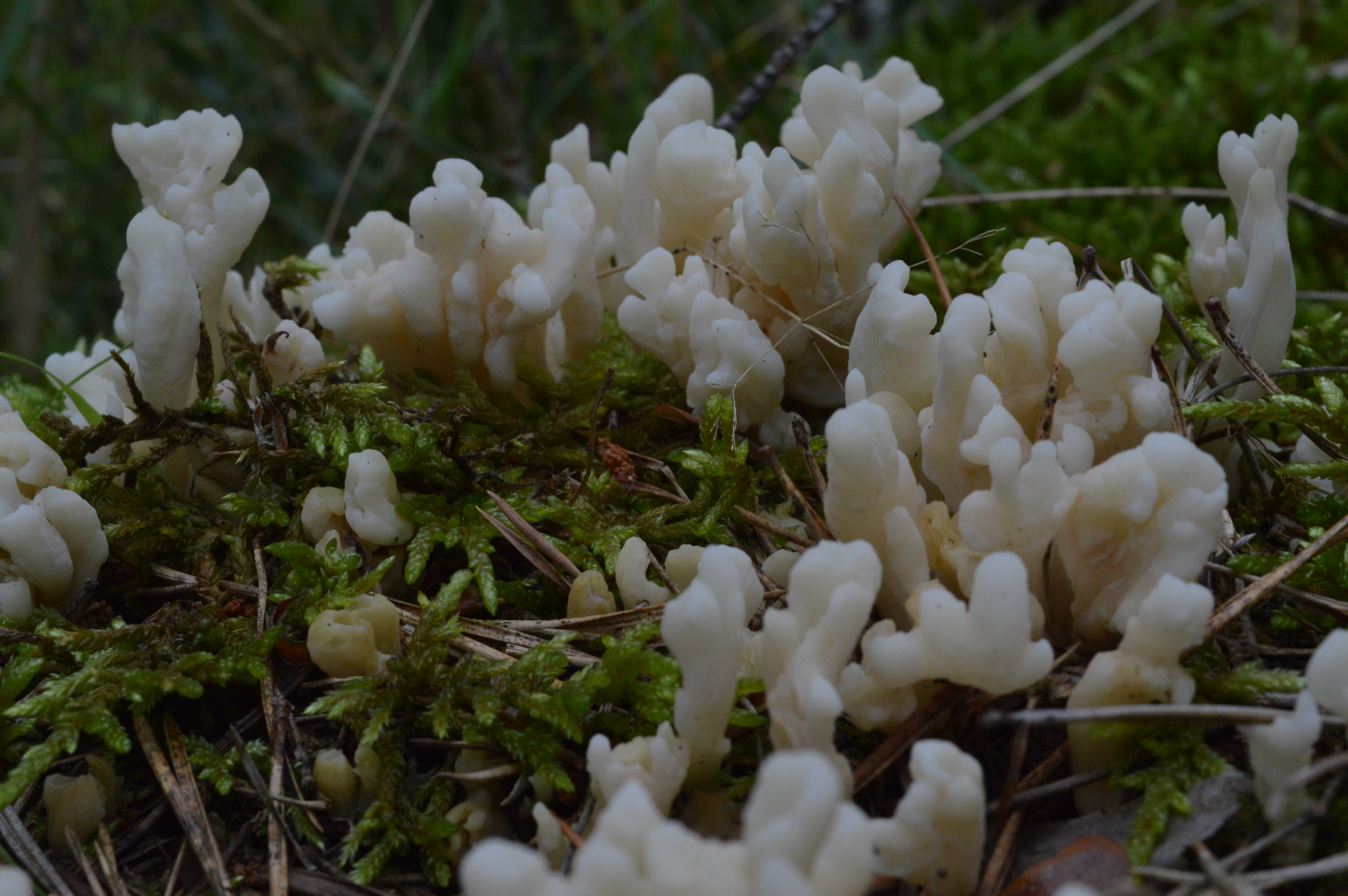

=== Microscopic features ===
Spores

The spores are white, roughly spherical, thick-walled, non-amyloid, smooth, and have dimensions of 7–11 by 6–10 μm. Basidia are club-shaped, 60–80 by 6–8 μm, and 2-spored. Cystidia are absent. Sterigmata, the slender projections of the basidium that bear the spores, may be straight or curved, and up to 7–8 μm long. Microscopic and molecular analysis indicate that the species is related to chanterelles.

=== Chemistry ===
In addition to the major fatty acid components, palmitic acid, oleic acid and linoleic acid, C. cristata contains two unusual fatty acids, cis-9, cis-14-octadecadien-12-ynoic acid, and the conjugated cis-9, trans-11, trans-13, cis-15-octadecatetraenoic acid (commonly known as α-parinaric acid). C. cristata is the only fungi known to contain α-parinaric acid.

=== Similar species ===
Some other coral fungi have macroscopic and microscopic features similar to C. cristata, making identification confusing. Clavulina rugosa is unbranched or sparingly branched. Clavulina cinerea is usually darker in color. Ramaria stricta has parallel branches and grows on wood. Lentaria byssiseda is light brown with white tips. Ramariopsis kunzei is often bright white and smooth, and Sebacina schweinitzii is very tough.

== Distribution and habitat ==
Clavulina cristata is found growing solitary or in clusters on the ground (sometimes on rotten wood) in both coniferous and hardwood forests in temperate areas of the Americas (October–March on the west coast of North America and July–October further inland) and Europe (June–November). It is a common mushroom, and typically fruits from late summer to winter.

== Uses ==
This fungus is edible, but the tough flesh and insubstantial fruit bodies make it unappetizing to some individuals. It is considered excellent by some.
