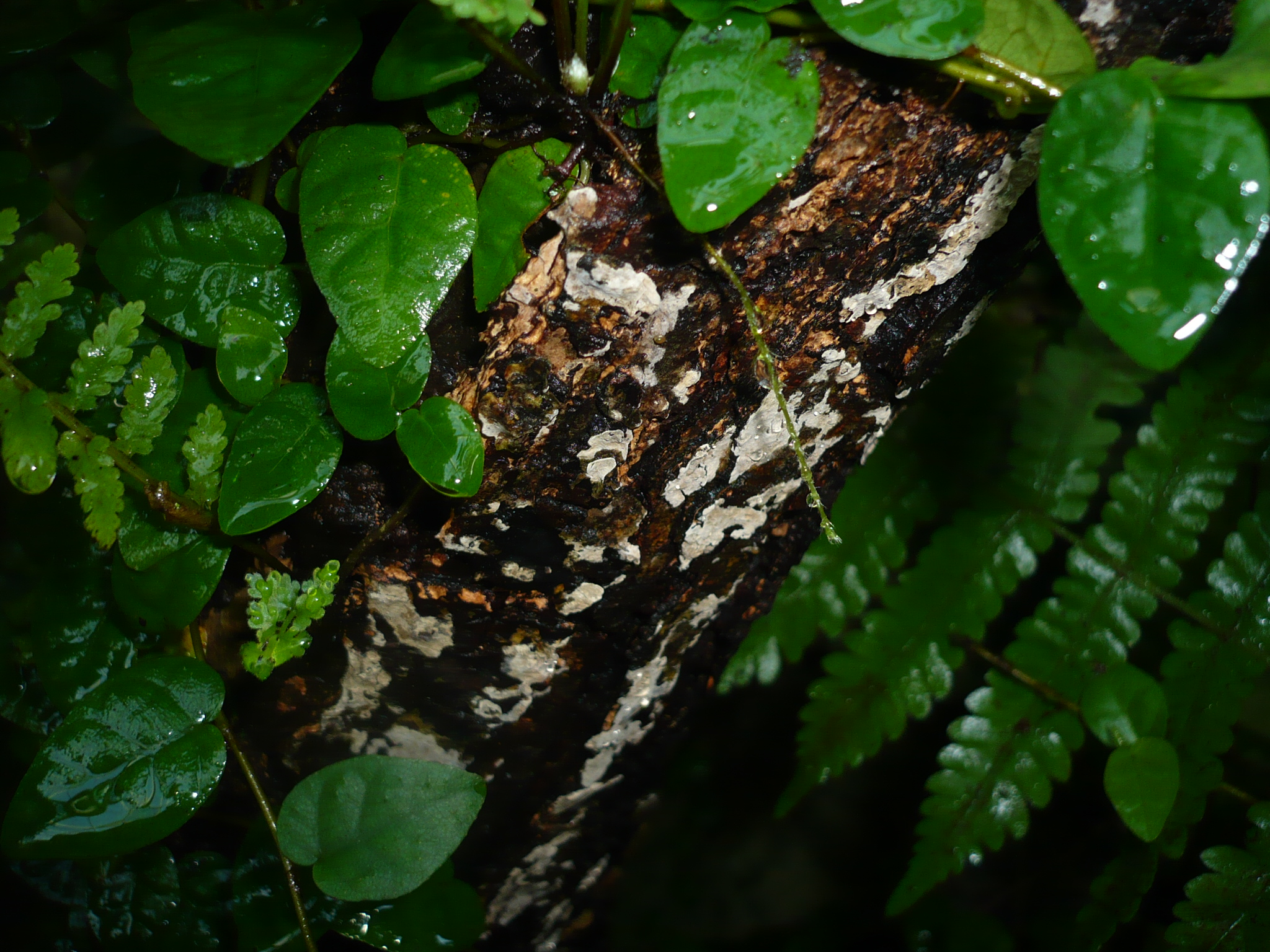
- Clavulicium macounii

Scientific classification
- Kingdom: Fungi
- Division: Basidiomycota
- Class: Agaricomycetes
- Order: Stereopsidales
- Family: Stereopsidaceae
- Genus: Clavulicium; Boidin (1957)

Type species
- Clavulicium pilatii (Boidin) Boidin (1957)

Species
- Clavulicium delectabile; Clavulicium extendens; Clavulicium hallenbergii; Clavulicium macounii; Clavulicium pilatii; Clavulicium venosum

= Clavulicium =

Genus of fungi

Clavulicium is a genus of corticioid fungi in the family Stereopsidaceae. It was formerly placed in the family Clavulinaceae in the order Cantharellales but was found to belong in a new order along with Stereopsis in 2014. The widespread genus was circumscribed by the French mycologist Jacques Boidin in 1957. The spores and the basidia of species in the genus are similar to those in Clavulina but also similar to those in Stereopsis. Clavulicium globosum is now a species of Stereopsis.
