= Clavulina griseohumicola =

Scientific classification
- Kingdom: Fungi
- Division: Basidiomycota
- Class: Agaricomycetes
- Order: Cantharellales
- Family: Hydnaceae
- Genus: Clavulina
- Species: C. griseohumicola

Binomial name
- Clavulina griseohumicola T.W.Henkel, Meszaros & Aime (2005)

Species of fungus

Clavulina griseohumicola is a species of fungus in the family Clavulinaceae. Described as new to science in 2005, it occurs in Guyana.
