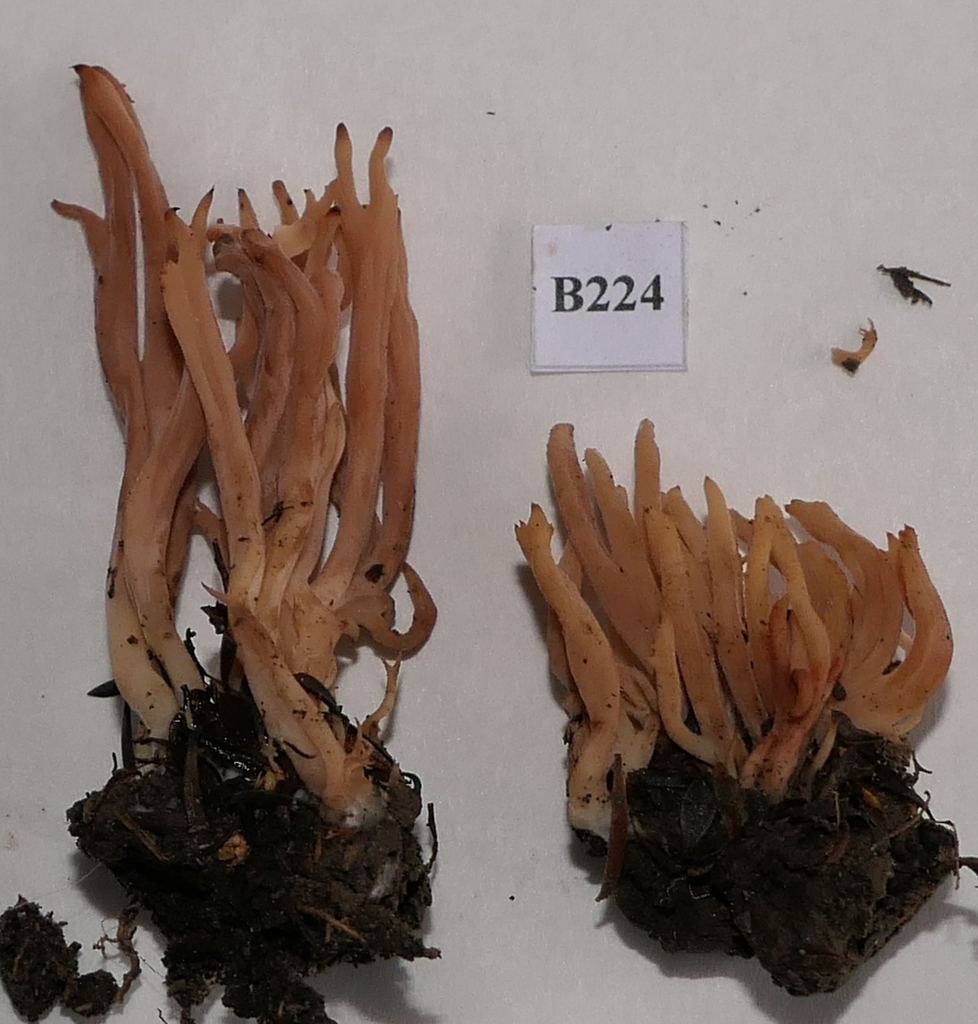
- Image of Clavulina vinaceocervina var. avellanea

Scientific classification
- Kingdom: Fungi
- Division: Basidiomycota
- Class: Agaricomycetes
- Order: Cantharellales
- Family: Hydnaceae
- Genus: Clavulina
- Species: C. vinaceocervina
- Variety: C. v. var. avellanea

Trinomial name
- Clavulina vinaceocervina var. avellanea Petersen

= Clavulina vinaceocervina var. avellanea =

Variety of the Clavulina vinaceocervina species

Clavulina vinaceocervina var. avellanea is a variety of the Clavulina vinaceocervina species. It has been previously described as characterised by its fleshy brown to violaceus tan colour, contrasting the typical variety of Clavulina vinaceocervina, Clavulina vinaceocervina var. vinaceocervina, which has a pinkish-rosy colour. Observations of Clavulina vinaceocervina var. avellanea since, however, have also shown a pinkish-rosy colour.

== Description ==
The fruit bodies of C. vinaceocervina var. avellanea can be up to 6.5 × 2 cm. These fruit bodies are arbuscular and branched, with branches on 2–4 ranks, or can be subsimple, with club branching once or twice near the apex. The stipe is short and can merge with the hymenium of white mycelium. The stipe may be clothed at the base with a hispid mycelium of a whitish colour. The stipe is flattened or lobed in cross section and has a pale to light yellow colour, thus it is concolorous with branches.

The branches are flattened and can be covered with white powder (spores) and hispid from cystidia. The colour is a pale to light yellow when young but can become fleshy brown to violaceous tan.

=== Microscopic features ===
The spores of C. vinaceocervina var. avellanea are globose, broadly ovate and hyaline (thin and translucent); 7.6–11.2 x 7.9–10.4 μm. Tramal hyphae of upper club or branches are hyaline and thin- to thick-walled (up to 0.2 μm thick); 2.5–7 μm in diameter. Hyphae are generally but loosely parallel. Cystidia are cylindrical, slightly thick-walled (up to 0.5 μm thick) and rounded at apex; 85–160 × 10–12 μm.

== Habitat ==
Clavulina vinaceocervina var. avellanea can be found under mixed podocarp and Nothofagus forest.

== Etymology ==
Vinaceo, from the Latin word which means 'wine-coloured'.

Cervina, from the Latin word which means 'of or pertaining to a deer'.

Avellanea from the Latin word which means 'hazel-coloured', 'nut-brown' (a light brown).

== Edibility ==
Clavulina vinaceocervina var. avellanea is not edible.
