= Burgella =

Scientific classification
- Kingdom: Fungi
- Division: Basidiomycota
- Class: Agaricomycetes
- Order: Cantharellales
- Family: Clavulinaceae
- Genus: Burgella; Diederich & Lawrey (2007)

Type species
- Burgella flavoparmeliae Diederich & Lawrey (2007)

Genus of fungi

Burgella is a genus of fungi in the family Clavulinaceae. The genus is monotypic, containing the single species Burgella flavoparmeliae, described in 2007.

The genus name of Burgella is in honour of Pietro Benedetto Luigi Burgo (1876-1964), an Italian electrical and industrial engineer.

The genus was circumscribed by Paul Diederich and James D. Lawrey in Biblioth. Lichenol. Vol.107 on page 22 in 2007.
