= Membranomyces =

Scientific classification
- Kingdom: Fungi
- Division: Basidiomycota
- Class: Agaricomycetes
- Order: Cantharellales
- Family: Clavulinaceae
- Genus: Membranomyces; Jülich (1975)

Type species
- Membranomyces spurius (Bourdot) Jülich (1975)

Species
- M. delectabilis M. spurius

Genus of fungi

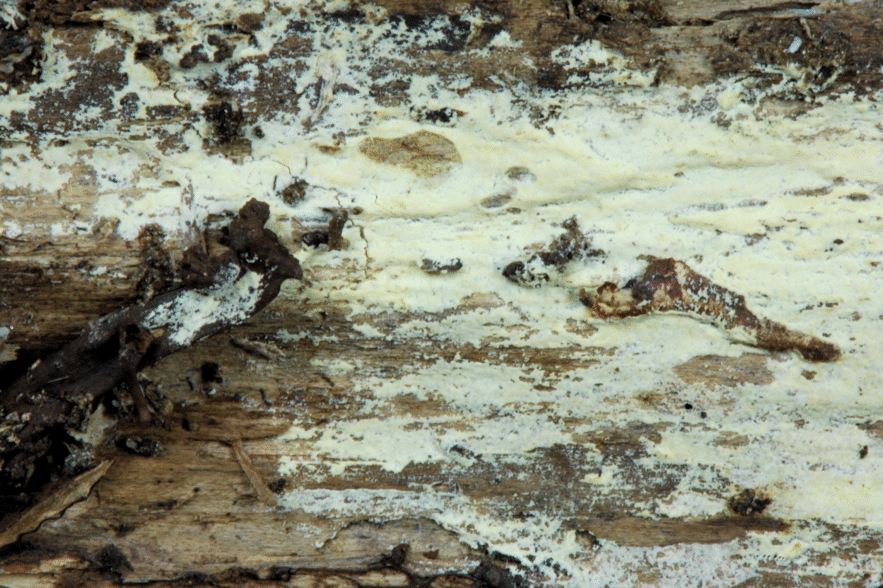
Dried basidiome of Membranomyces delectabilis.

Membranomyces is a genus of fungi in the family Clavulinaceae. The genus, circumscribed in 1975, contains two species found in Europe and Canada.
