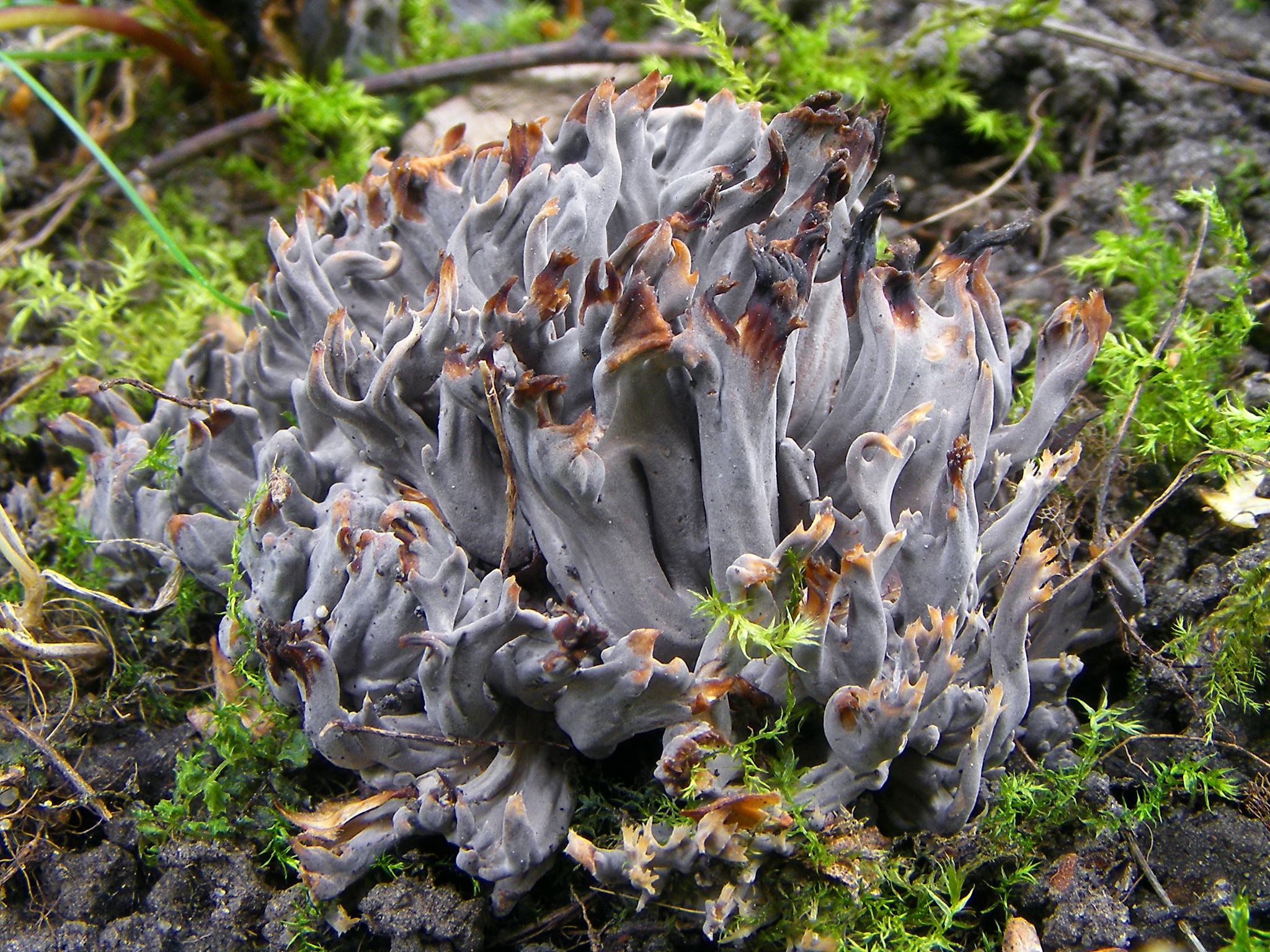

Scientific classification
- Kingdom: Fungi
- Division: Basidiomycota
- Class: Agaricomycetes
- Order: Cantharellales
- Family: Hydnaceae
- Genus: Clavulina
- Species: C. cinerea

Binomial name
- Clavulina cinerea (Bull.) J.Schröt. (1888)

Synonyms
- Clavaria coralloides-cinerea Bull. (1788); Clavaria cinerea Bull. (1791); Ramaria cinerea (Bull.) Gray (1821); Merisma cinereum (Bull.) Spreng. (1827); Corallium cinereum (Bull.) G.Hahn (1883)

= Clavulina cinerea =

Species of fungus

Clavulina cinerea, commonly known as the gray coral or ashy coral mushroom, is a species of coral fungus in the family Clavulinaceae. This grayish white edible fungus stands 2–11 centimetres (3/4–4 1/4 in) tall, and can be found on the ground from July to October in Northeastern North America and until November in Europe.

It can be eaten raw in small amounts or as a cooking ingredient. It can be preserved in oil.
