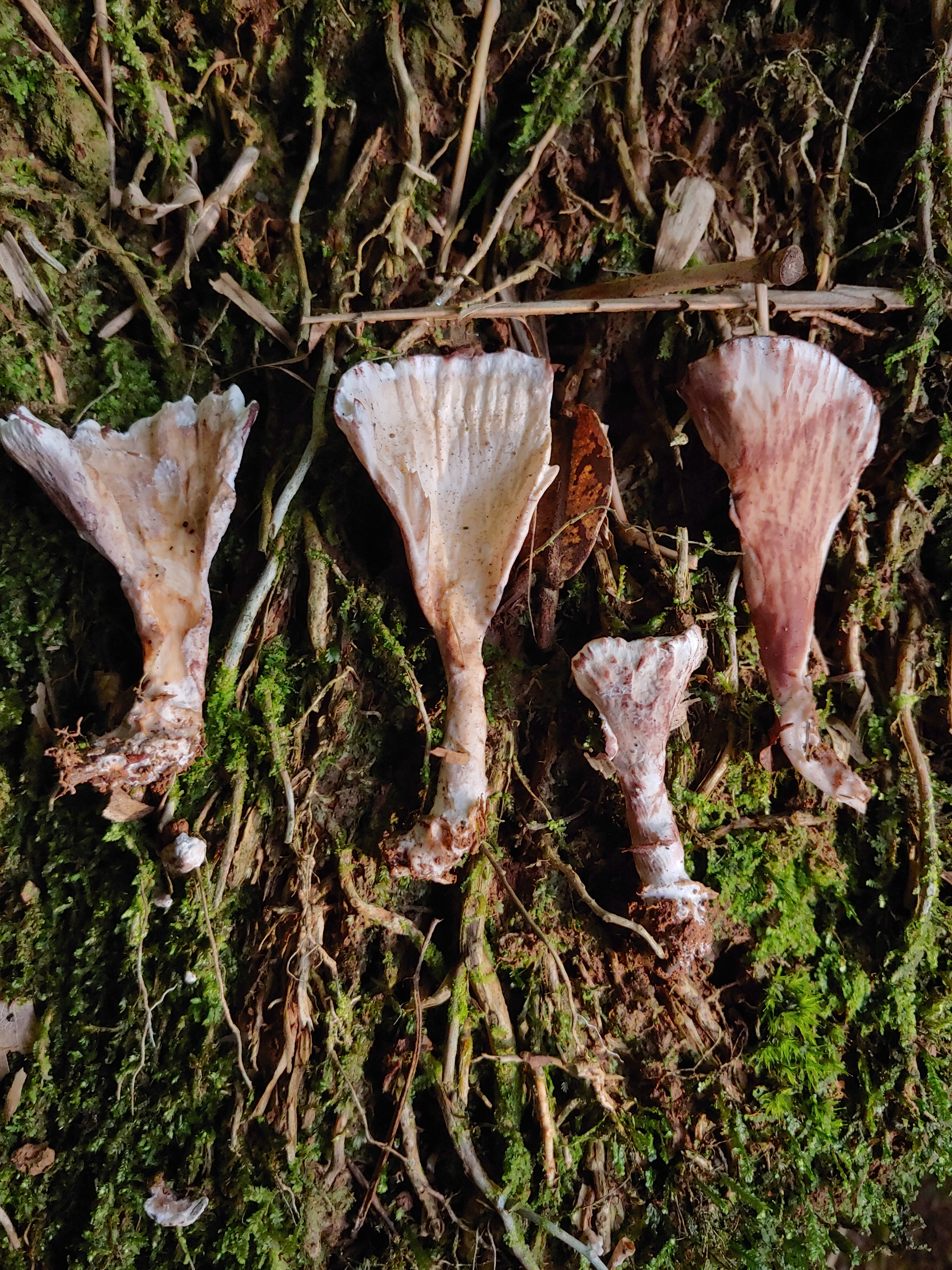
- Stereopsis radicans

Scientific classification
- Kingdom: Fungi
- Division: Basidiomycota
- Class: Agaricomycetes
- Order: Stereopsidales; Sjkvist, E. Larss., B.E. Pfeil & K. H. Larss. (2014)
- Family: Stereopsidaceae; Sjkvist, E. Larss., B.E. Pfeil & K. H. Larss. (2014)

Type genus
- Stereopsis D.A.Reid (1965)

Genera
- Clavulicium; Stereopsis

= Stereopsidaceae =

Order of fungi

The Stereopsidales are an order of fungi in the class Agaricomycetes. There is a single family, Stereopsidaceae. It was first described in 2014 to contain the genera Stereopsis, which was until then classified in the order Polyporales, and Clavulicium, which was until then classified in the order Cantharellales. Molecular phylogenetics analysis showed these two genera to belong together in their own order. This order might belong in the subclass Phallomycetidae, but this relationship was poorly supported. The Stereopsidales contain corticoid fungi (Clavulicium and Stereopsis) and stalked, funnel shaped fungi (Stereopsis). They are united by features of their spores, which have refractive contents, and become angular and amber-like as they dry. All known members also possess basidia with two sterigmata, although this is also a feature of fungi in many other orders.
