= Chaetotyphula =

Scientific classification
- Kingdom: Fungi
- Division: Basidiomycota
- Class: Agaricomycetes
- Order: Agaricales
- Family: Pterulaceae
- Genus: Chaetotyphula; Corner

Type species
- Chaetotyphula hyalina (Jungh.) Corner

Species
- C. actiniceps C. amylochaete C. columbiana C. gelatinosa C. hyalina C. montana C. tetraspora

Genus of fungi

Chaetotyphula is a genus of fungi in the Pterulaceae family. The genus is distributed largely in tropical areas, and contains seven species.

== Species ==
- Chaetotyphula actiniceps
- Chaetotyphula amylochaete
- Chaetotyphula columbiana
- Chaetotyphula gelatinosa
- Chaetotyphula hyalina
- Chaetotyphula montana
- Chaetotyphula tetraspora
