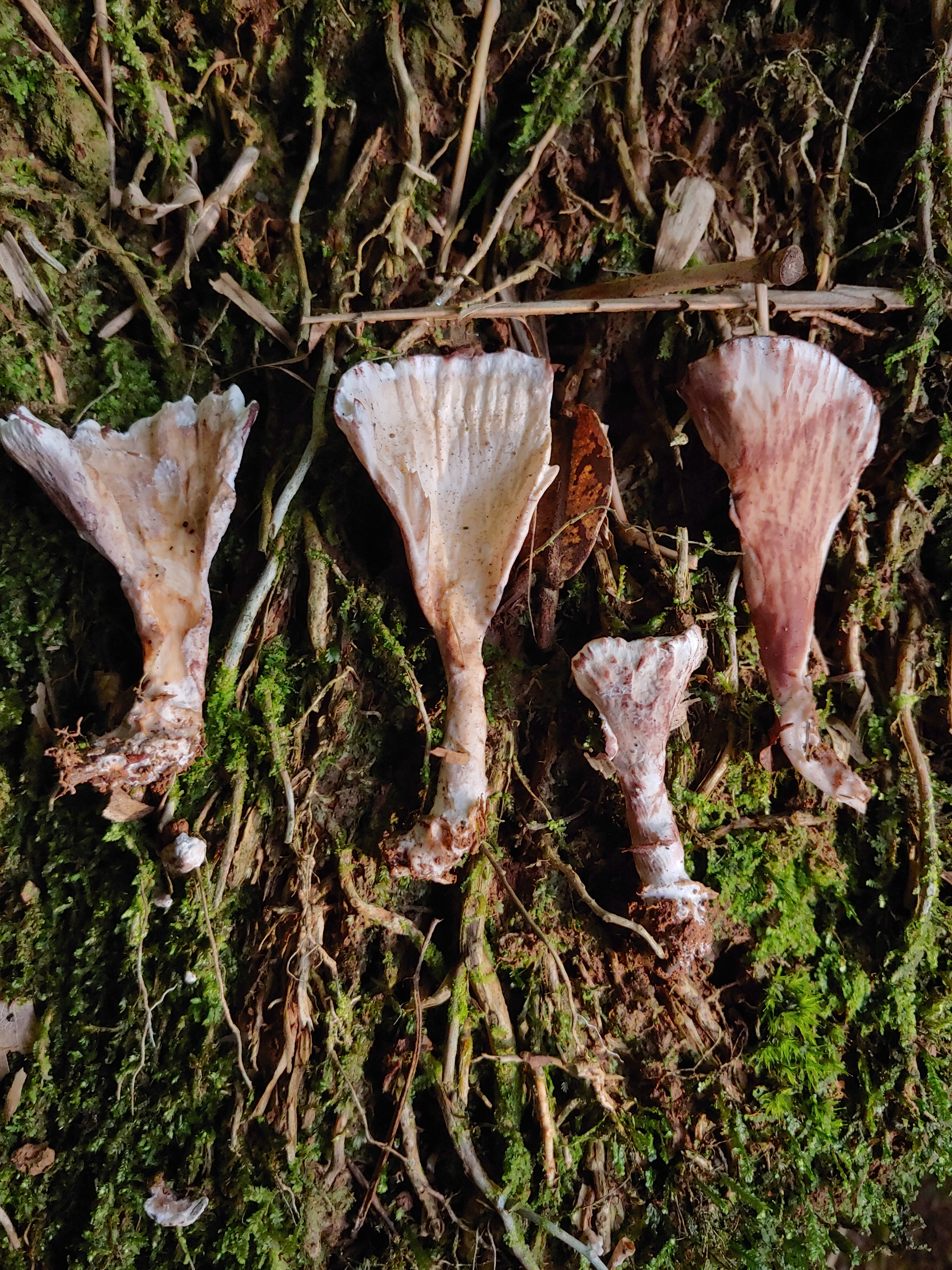
- Stereopsis radicans

Scientific classification
- Kingdom: Fungi
- Division: Basidiomycota
- Class: Agaricomycetes
- Order: Stereopsidales
- Family: Stereopsidaceae
- Genus: Stereopsis; D.A.Reid (1965)

Type species
- Stereopsis radicans (Berk.) D.A.Reid (1965)

= Stereopsis (fungus) =

Genus of fungi

Stereopsis is a genus of fungi in the family Stereopsidaceae. The genus was formerly placed in the family Meruliaceae in the order Polyporales but was found to belong in its own order along with the genus Clavulicium. The genus Stereopsis was circumscribed by English mycologist Derek Reid in 1965. It contains species that form funnel-shaped basidiocarps as well as the corticioid species Stereopsis globosa which was formerly considered a species of Clavulicium.

== Species ==
The following species are recognised in the genus Stereopsis:

- Stereopsis burtiana
- Stereopsis cartilaginea
- Stereopsis crassipileata
- Stereopsis gracilistipitata
- Stereopsis hiscens
- Stereopsis globosa
- Stereopsis malaiensis
- Stereopsis mussooriensis
- Stereopsis nigripes
- Stereopsis pseudocupulata
- Stereopsis radicans
- Stereopsis raphiae
- Stereopsis reidii
- Stereopsis sparassoides
- Stereopsis straminea
- Stereopsis vitellina - found in a molecular phylogenetics study to belong to the order Atheliales, but it has not yet been transferred to its own genus.

=== Former species ===
- Stereopsis humphreyi was reclassified to Baisuzhenia humphreyi
