= Corticirama =

Scientific classification
- Kingdom: Fungi
- Division: Basidiomycota
- Class: Agaricomycetes
- Order: Corticiales
- Family: Corticiaceae
- Genus: Corticirama; Pilát

Type species
- Corticirama petrakii Pilát

Species
- C. berchtesgadensis C. petrakii

Genus of fungi

Corticirama is a genus of fungi in the family Corticiaceae. The genus contains two species found in Europe.
