= Kartar Singh Thind =

Indian botanist (1917–1991)

Kartar Singh Thind (30 October 1917 – 3 December 1991) was a botanist. He was born in Saidpur, Sultanpur Lodhi tehsil, Kapurthala district, Punjab, India.

A scientist and educationist, Thind was M.Sc, Ph. D, F.N.A.Sc. He did his Doctorate in Plant Pathology from the University of Wisconsin, USA.

Thind was a professor and Head of the Department of Botany at Panjab University, Chandigarh. He authored or co-authored numerous research articles on phytopathology which were published from 1957 until his death in numerous national and international scientific journals. His fields of specialization were mycology and phytopathology (plant P pathology). He also wrote several books including Physiology of Fungi, a text that is recognised as authoritative in the field of phytopathology.

Thind was a Fellow of the Indian Academy of Sciences and a Member of the Indian Phytopathological Society. He was honoured with FNA on 17 December 1967. In 1979, he received the Panchanan Maheshwari medal, an award instituted to commemorate the memory of Professor P. Maheshwari.

He died on 3 December 1991.
