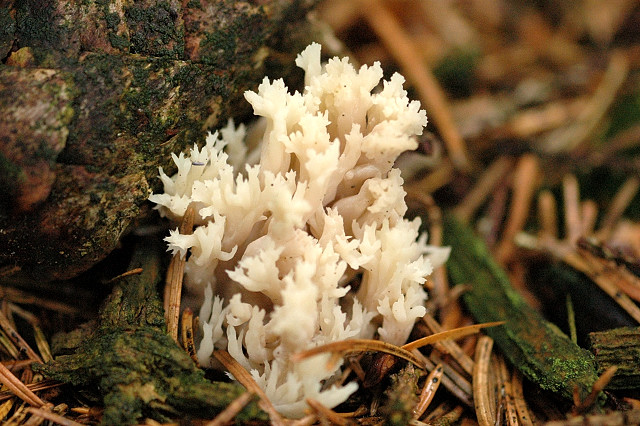
- Clavulina coralloides

Scientific classification
- Kingdom: Fungi
- Division: Basidiomycota
- Class: Agaricomycetes
- Order: Cantharellales
- Family: Hydnaceae
- Genus: Clavulina; J.Schröt. (1888)

Type species
- Clavulina cristata (Holmsk.) J.Schröt. (1888)

= Clavulina =

Genus of fungi

Clavulina is a genus of fungus in the family Clavulinaceae, in the Cantharelloid clade (order Cantharellales). Species are characterized by having extensively branched fruit bodies, white spore prints, and bisterigmate basidia (often with secondary septation). Branches are cylindrical or flattened, blunt, and pointed or crested at the apex, hyphae with or without clamps, basidia cylindrical to narrowly clavate, mostly with two sterigmata which are large and strongly incurved and spores subspherical or broadly ellipsoid, smooth, and thin-walled, each with one large oil drop or guttule. The genus contains approximately forty-five species with a worldwide distribution, primarily in tropical regions.

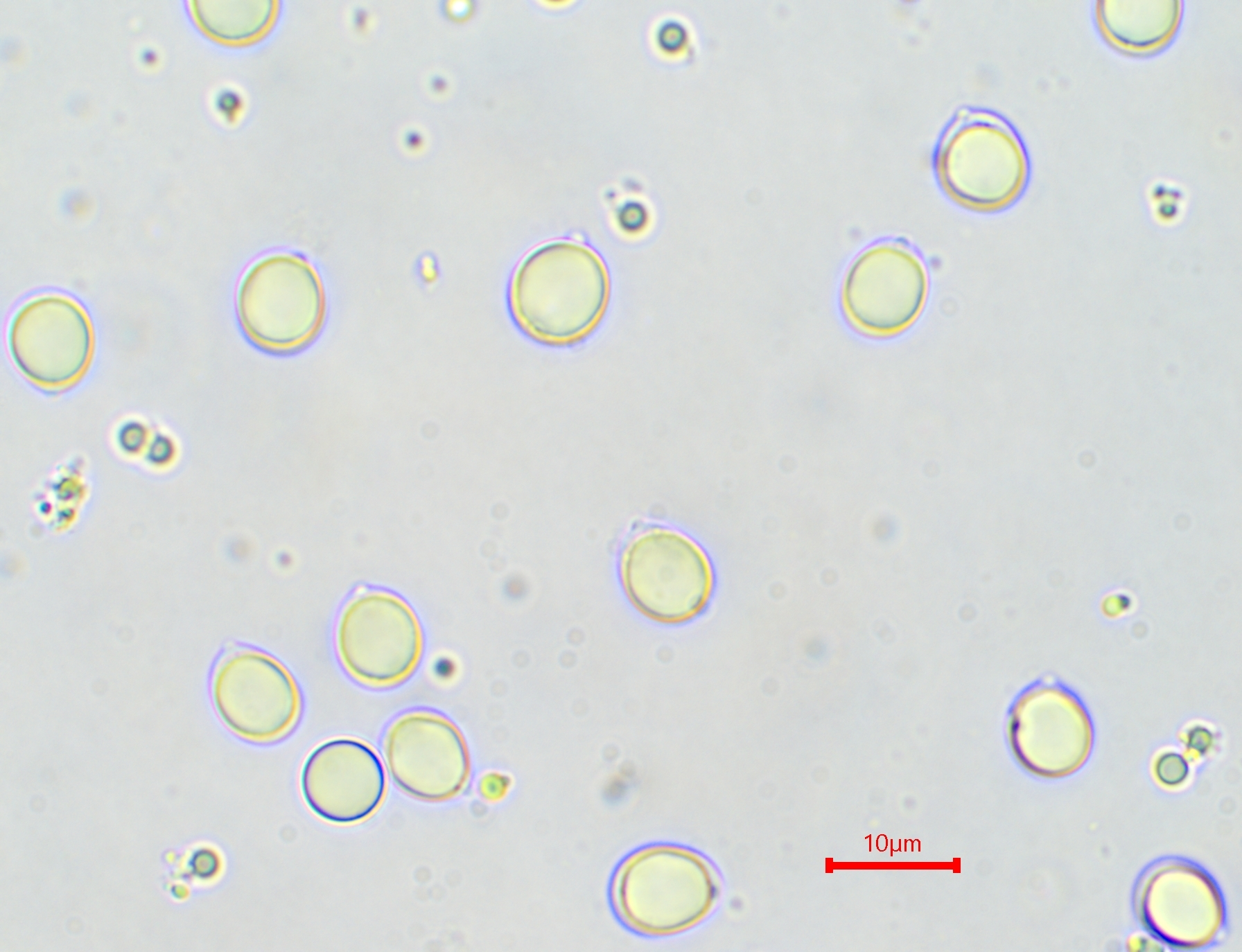
Clavulina spores

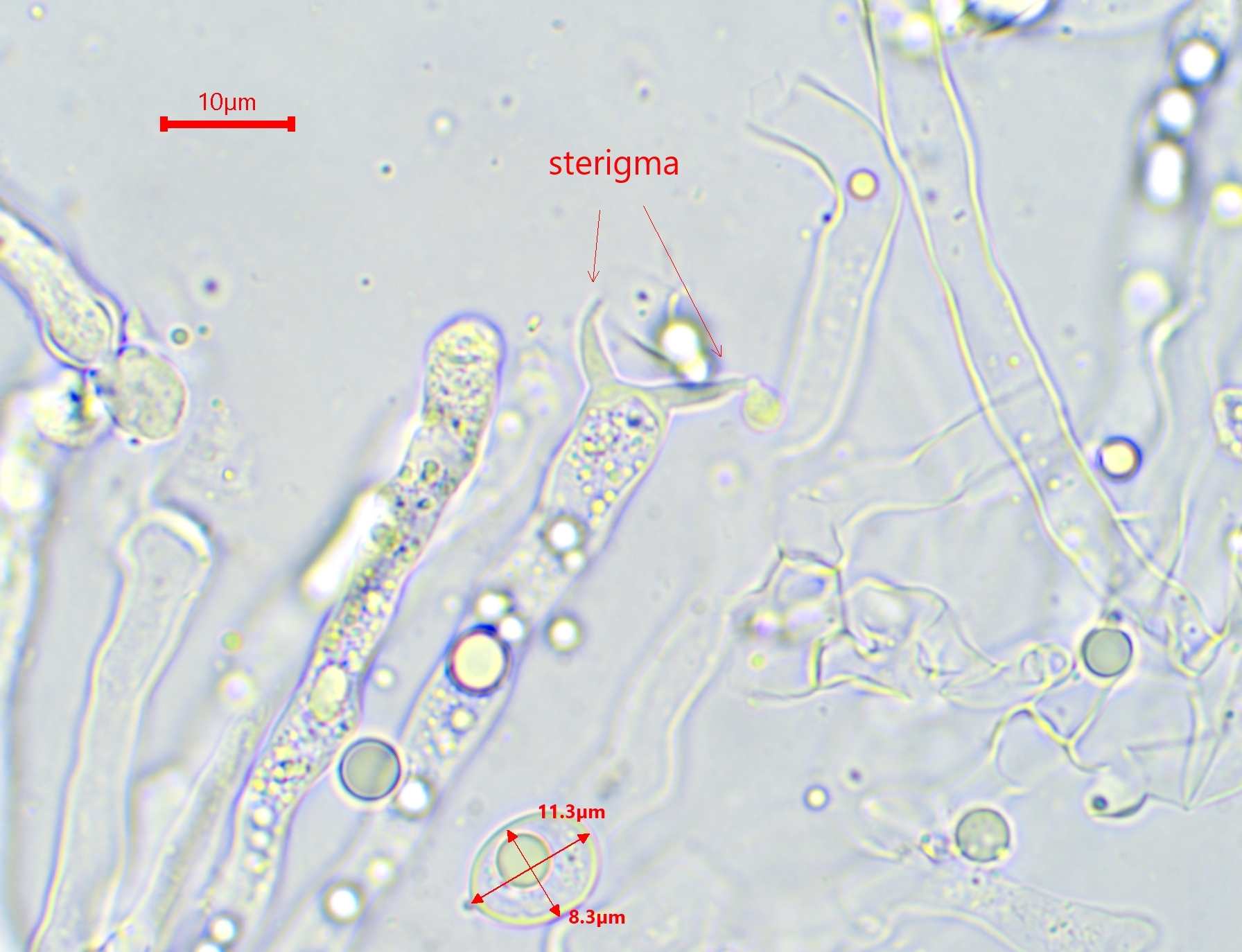
basidia with two sterigmata

== Species ==
- C. alutaceosiccescens
- C. amazoensis
- C. amethystina
- C. amethystinoides
- C. arcuatus
- C. brunneocinerea
- C. caespitosa
- C. cartilaginea
- C. cavipes
- C. cerebriformis
- C. chondroides
- C. cinerea
- C. cinereoglebosa
- C. cirrhata
- C. coffeoflava
- C. connata
- C. copiosocystidiata
- C. coralloides
- C. craterelloides
- C. cristata
- C. decipiens
- C. delicia
- C. dicymbetorum
- C. effusa
- C. floridana
- C. gallica
- C. geoglossoides
- C. gigartinoides
- C. gracilis
- C. griseohumicola
- C. hispidulosa
- C. humicola
- C. humilis
- C. incrustata
- C. ingrata
- C. iris
- C. kunmudlutsa
- C. leveillei
- C. limosa
- C. monodiminutiva
- C. mussooriensis
- C. nigricans
- C. ornatipes
- C. panurensis
- C. puiggarii
- C. purpurea
- C. ramosior
- C. rugosa
- C. samuelsii
- C. septocystidiata
- C. sprucei
- C. subrugosa
- C. tasmanica
- C. tepurumenga
- C. urnigerobasidiata
- C. vinaceocervina
- C. viridula
- C. wisoli

== Distribution ==
Clavulina species are important primary colonizers of forest litter, and occur immediately after the pre-monsoon showers. Two species of Clavulina – C. coralloides (known as white or crested coral fungus) and C. rugosa – have been recorded from the moist-deciduous to evergreen forests of the Western Ghats, Kerala, India.
