= E. J. H. Corner =

English botanist and mycologist (1906-1996)

- Born: 12 January 1906; London, England
- Died: 14 September 1996 (aged 90); Great Shelford, Cambridgeshire, England
- Citizenship: United Kingdom
- Education: Sidney Sussex College, Cambridge
- Spouse(s): Sheila Kavanagh Bailey, Helga Dinesen
- Children: John Kavanagh Corner (son), Stephanie Christine Corner (daughter), Dorothy Lindsay Helga Corner (daughter)
- Scientific career
- Fields: Mycology, Botany
- Workplaces: Singapore Botanic Gardens, UNESCO, University of Cambridge
- Notable students: David Mabberley, Peter Shaw Ashton
- Author abbrev. (botany): Corner

Edred John Henry Corner FRS (12 January 1906 – 14 September 1996) was an English mycologist and botanist who occupied the posts of assistant director at the Singapore Botanic Gardens (1929–1946) and Professor of Tropical Botany at the University of Cambridge (1965–1973). Corner was a Fellow of Sidney Sussex College from 1959.

== Early life ==
Corner was born in London in 1906. He was the son of Edred Moss Corner (1873–1950), a surgeon and surgical author, and Henrietta Corner. At the age of five he developed a stammer which persisted through elocution lessons. From the age of six to nine, he attended Arnold House, a day school in London, where he studied Greek and Latin. From ten to 13, he went to boarding school in Hertfordshire where he focused on the classics and maths. Here, his athletic prowess dominated, but a bout of polio temporarily crippled his abilities. He attended Rugby school during his high school years where he studied the classics, but soon grew bored and switched to science. He gave up playing sports to take botanical excursions where his fascination with mushrooms began. His father joined the British Mycological Society and took his 14-year-old son on one of the forays where Corner had the chance to rub shoulders with mycologists such as Carleton Rea and AHR Buller.

In 1923 he went to Sidney Sussex College, Cambridge. He continued studying science and realised how much there was yet to learn. This realisation was lifelong and drove him in the relentless pursuit of knowledge until the day when he could no longer see. At Sidney Sussex College, Corner met and became the disciple of Arthur Harry Church. He initially focused his research on microfungi and the association between fungi and bryophytes.

== Singapore ==
Because of his stammer, Corner believed he could never hold a teaching position; this led him to enroll in the Colonial Service and he took a position as a mycologist at the Botanical Gardens in Singapore. He was appointed Assistant Director in 1929 and remained in this position until 1946.

As the Malaysian forests were being logged for timber, he took several trips there to study the diversity of fungi and plants. It was in these forests that he was first exposed to fig trees. This was the beginning of his systematic reorganisation of the genus Ficus based on breeding systems.

From 1934 to 1938, he took several journeys to Malaysia where he discovered many new species of plants. During this period, the value of the Botanical Gardens was being called into question; to illustrate the value of the collection and the diversity of the region as a whole, Corner took it upon himself to write the Wayside Trees of Malaya—a two volume, 800-page book aimed at amateur naturalists as an aid to identifying trees in the region. The book was the culmination of many years of effort that drew upon his knowledge of flora, months of field activity, examination of herbarium collections and other scientific documentation—-an effort that encompassed the work of many scientists before him.

Corner found help with his collecting from an unusual source: to obtain specimens from the tops of trees that he could not safely reach, Corner trained coconut-collecting macaque monkeys to do the climbing and collect specimens for him while at the Botanic Gardens.

In 1942 Singapore surrendered to the invading Japanese forces during WWII. Japan would occupy the region until 1945. Corner went to enlist in the Singapore Volunteer Force, but an attack by one of his collecting monkeys left him unable to participate.

Corner was conscripted by the Japanese to protect and preserve the Botanical Gardens' herbarium collection and various library contents from looters during the time of occupation. The Japanese Emperor Hirohito was an orchid enthusiast and approved the decision to keep Corner at his post at the Gardens. While most British subjects were detained in overcrowded prisoner camps and suffered from severe food shortages, Corner was allowed to live outside the prison camps and to lead a somewhat ordinary life. The caveat was that the Japanese identified Corner as an enemy alien and required him to wear a red star. Because of these freedoms, Corner was accused by some of collaborating with the enemy, while in reality he cooperated just enough to keep the herbarium collection safe. Additionally, he smuggled food and other goods to the people detained in the prison camps. He later wrote about his experiences during wartime in his book, "The Marquis — A Tale of Syoyan-to".

== Post-Singapore ==
When the war ended, Corner returned to England, but two years later, he was off to South America working for UNESCO as Principal Field Scientific Officer for Latin America. He planned to set up a field institute; but this fell through due to conspiracies about breaches of natural security. Undoubtedly, the most important scientific contribution to come from this time was the formation of Corner's Durian Theory.

The Durian Theory was Corner's way of explaining how forests evolved to their present form. This theory was based on observations of a suite of morphological anomalies of tropical plants in Malaysia. The morphological features on which his theory was based were fruits with fleshy arils, fruits with distinct black and red coloration and seeds hanging away from the fruit. These features were relatively rare in forest plants as a whole, but they occurred across a broad range of plant families. He postulated that the peculiar characters he observed were ancestral, making them anomalies in present-day forests. For instance, it was his view that the pachycaul tree form, or stumpy little-branched tree with big leaves, was ancestral compared to the leptocaul form, or tall tree with many branches, slender twigs and small leaves. He thought that an increase in tree height was in response to feeding by ground-dwelling animals. An increase in tree height also resulted in an explosion of biodiversity in the canopy due to new niches to fill.

Corner returned to England in 1949 when he was appointed Lecturer in Taxonomy and Tropical Botany at the Botany School in Cambridge. Here he was able to work on the botanical and mycological groups he had collected in Singapore. For research on the phytogeography of Ficus he visited Bougainville in 1960, led Royal Society Expeditions to Mount Kinabalu in Borneo during 1961 and 1964, work which influenced the creation of Kinabalu Park, and took part in the Royal Society Expedition to Solomon Islands in 1965. In 1973 he retired as Emeritus Professor. During his retirement, he generated over 2200 printed pages of accepted publications—mostly in mycological research.

== Contributions to mycology ==
Corner started his career studying microfungi and published five papers on discomycetes. He then moved on to nectriaceous fungi and was likely the first person to demonstrate the intimate relationship between fungi and bryophytes. Further research regarding the fungal/bryophyte relationship has uncovered many more such associations, and researchers now estimate that more than 2000 exist.

One of the qualities that made Corner such a remarkable scientist was his analytical skills; his legacy in mycology resides in the conclusions he was able to draw on fungal morphology and development as well as systematics. During his internment in Singapore, he published on Malaysian wood-rotting polypores, especially economically important ones such as Phellinus noxius. He also worked through the hyphal structure of polypores with descriptions and illustrations of monomitic, dimitic and trimitic hyphal construction.

He also made major strides in the systematics of clavarioid fungi. As it stood in 1950, the genus Clavaria was a polyphyletic assemblage of coral-shaped fungi. Corner determined that many species of "Clavaria" were actually members of different genera, families and even orders. Using spore characteristics, he determined that a genus of clavarioid fungi—Ramaria—is closely related to a genus of cantharelloid fungi—Gomphus.

In his research, Corner stressed the importance of understanding the development and anatomy of fungi, which he realised could not be known just by observing one stage of the specimen. Arguably, his most important contribution on fungal development was determining the role of the basidium as a charged ampoule. He also observed basidiospore development in boletoid and tricholomatoid fungi.

In addition to working out systematic relationships of many groups of macrofungi, he also wrote monographs of large groups present in southeast Asia. His work on boletes led to the description of 123 new species and culminated in his classic monograph Boletus in Malaysia as well as a supplement which included species in the genus Phylloporus. Corner also wrote monographs on tricholomatoid, cantharelloid, clavarioid and polyporoid fungi, as well as the genus Thelephora. Corner's monographic work has not only aided those who work in tropical mycology but also those working on the groups in temperate ecosystems. Additionally, these monographs provide the framework for helping mycologists understand the extent of biodiversity in tropical ecosystems.

Most of his collections, annotated books and illustrations are housed at the Royal Botanic Garden Edinburgh. His other collections remain at Cambridge or at the United States National Fungus Collection in Beltsville, MD.

== Personal life ==
In February 1939, Corner married Sheila Kavanagh Bailey in Cambridgeshire. Their first child, John Kavanagh Corner, was born in Singapore in January 1941. The couple also had two daughters, Stephanie Christine Corner born in 1947 in Hanover, New Hampshire, and Dorothy Lindsay Helga Corner in 1948 in Essex. Corner and his wife ultimately divorced in 1952. He remarried in April 1953 to his daughters' nanny, Helga Dinesen Sondergaard, and they had a son. In 1975, he was diagnosed with glaucoma and then cataracts in both eyes, and by 1983 he was unable to do any more microscopy. Even though his physical capacities declined sharply due to muscular paralysis and he was near blindness, Corner's mental faculties remained sharp until his death in 1996.

Corner's son, John, left home at 19, never to see his father again. In 2013 he published a memoir of his father's life and their relationship, My father in his suitcase: In search of E.J.H. Corner, the relentless botanist (Landmark Books, Singapore, 2013, 413 pages, photographs, notes and bibliography, ISBN 978-981-4189-47-7), based on letters, pictures and other memorabilia his father had saved for him in a suitcase.

Although Corner reportedly detested the idea of naming new species after people, he currently has three fungal species and the fungal genera Corneroboletus and Corneroporus named after him, as well as 30 plant species including: Anisophyllea corneri, Calamus corneri, Bulbophyllum corneri, and Platyscapa corneri.

== Societies and honours ==
- Honorary Member of the British Mycological Society
- Honorary Member of the Mycological Society of America
- Elected Fellow of the Royal Society 1955
- Darwin Medal (1960)
- Founder's Medal of the Royal Geographical Society (1966)
- Linnean Medal (1970)
- Japanese International Prize for Biology (1985)
- Made CBE

== Books ==
- Corner EJH (1940). Wayside trees of Malaya (2 vols). Singapore: Government Printing Office.
- Corner EJH (1950). A Monograph of Clavaria and allied genera. London: Oxford University Press.
- Corner EJH (1952). Wayside trees of Malaya, 2nd ed. (2 vols). Singapore: Government Printing Office.
- Corner EJH (1964). The Life of Plants. University of Chicago Press.
- Corner EJH (1966). Natural History of Palms. Berkeley: University of California Press.
- Corner EJH (1966). A Monograph of Cantharelloid fungi. London: Oxford University Press.
- Corner EJH (1968). A Monograph of Thelephora (Basidiomycetes). Lehre: J. Cramer.
- Corner EJH (1972). Boletus in Malaysia. Singapore: Government Printing Office / Botanic Gardens.
- Corner EJH (1976). The Seeds of Dicotyledons (2 vols). Cambridge UK: Cambridge University Press.
- Corner EJH (1978). The Freshwater swamp-forest of South Johore and Singapore. Singapore: Botanic Gardens, Parks & Recreation Dept.
- Corner EJH (1981). The Agaric genera Lentinus, Panus, and Pleurotus: with particular reference to Malaysian species. Vaduz: J. Cramer.
- Corner EJH (1981). The Marquis: a tale of Syonan-to. Singapore: Heinemann Asia.
- Corner EJH (1988). Wayside trees of Malaya, 3rd ed. (2 vols). Kuala Lumpur: Malayan Nature Society.
- Corner EJH (1989). Ad Polyporaceas VI : the genus Trametes. Berlin: J. Cramer.
- Corner EJH (1991). Ad Polyporaceas VII : the Xanthochroic Polypores. Berlin: J. Cramer.
- Corner EJH (1991). Trogia (Basidiomycetes). Singapore: National Parks Board, Singapore Botanic Gardens.
- Corner EJH (1994). Agarics in Malesia. Berlin: J. Cramer.

== See also ==
- Category:Taxa named by E. J. H. Corner
