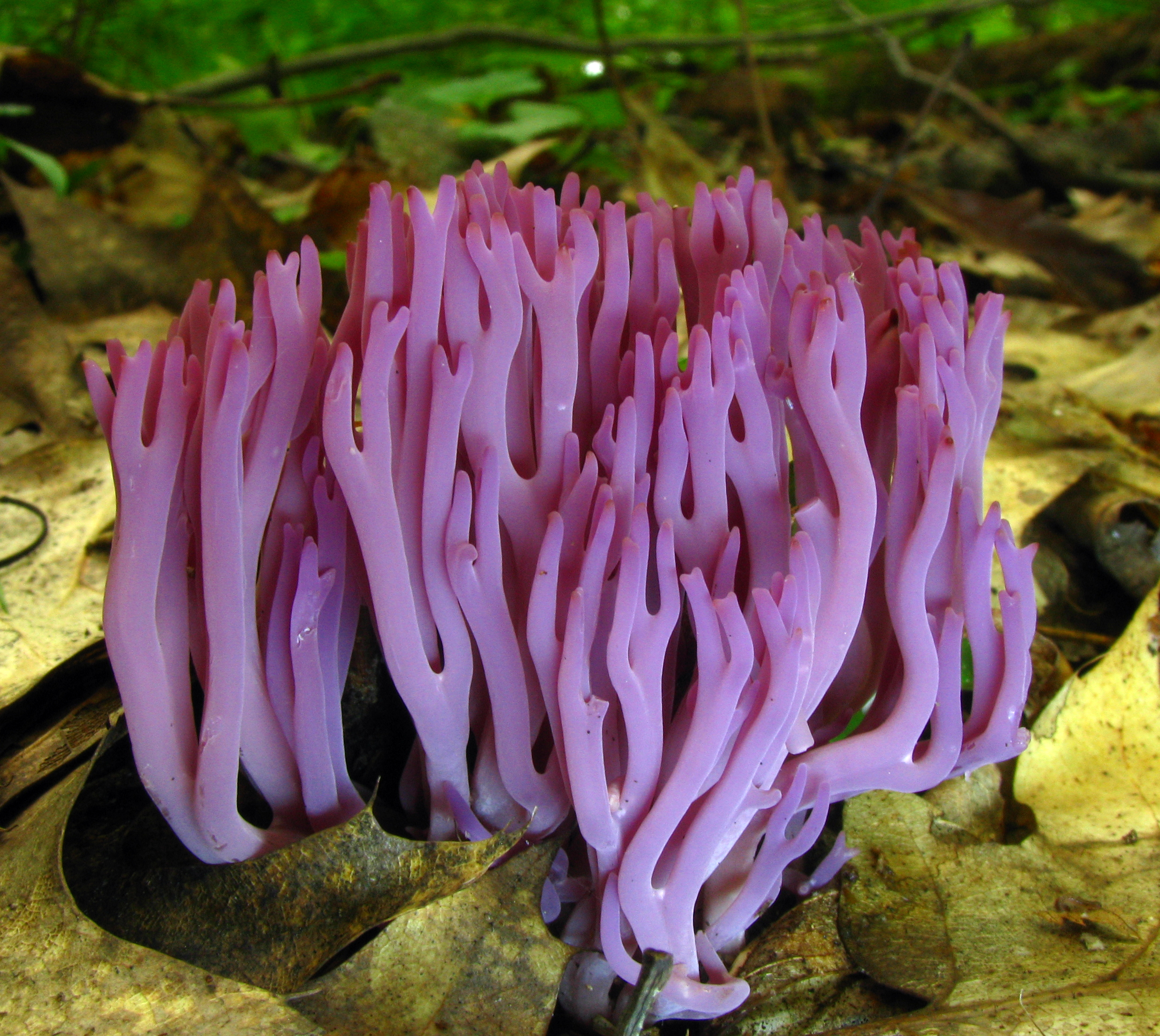
- Clavaria zollingeri

Scientific classification
- Kingdom: Fungi
- Subkingdom: Dikarya
- Division: Basidiomycota

Groups included
- See text

= Clavarioid fungi =

Group of fungi

The clavarioid fungi are a group of fungi in the Basidiomycota typically having erect, simple or branched basidiocarps (fruit bodies) that are formed on the ground, on decaying vegetation, or on dead wood. They are colloquially called club fungi and coral fungi.

Originally such fungi were referred to the genus Clavaria ("clavarioid" means Clavaria-like), but it is now known that clavarioid species are not all closely related. Since they are often studied as a group, it is convenient to retain the informal (non-taxonomic) name of "clavarioid fungi" and this term is frequently used in research papers.

== History ==
Clavaria was one of the original genera created by Linnaeus in his Species Plantarum of 1753. It contained all species of fungi with erect, club-shaped or branched (coral-like) fruit bodies, including many that are now referred to the Ascomycota. Subsequent authors described over 1200 species in the genus. With increasing use of the microscope in the late nineteenth century, most of the ascomycetous members of the genus were recognized as distinct and moved to other genera. Clavaria was still used for the majority of the basidiomycetous species until Donk reviewed Dutch species in 1933 (introducing the genera Clavariadelphus, Ramariopsis, and Ramaria in its modern sense) and Corner published his world monograph in 1950, introducing most of the remaining modern genera. DNA sequencing has since confirmed the diversity of the clavarioid fungi, not only placing species in different genera, but also in different families and orders.

== Description and genera ==
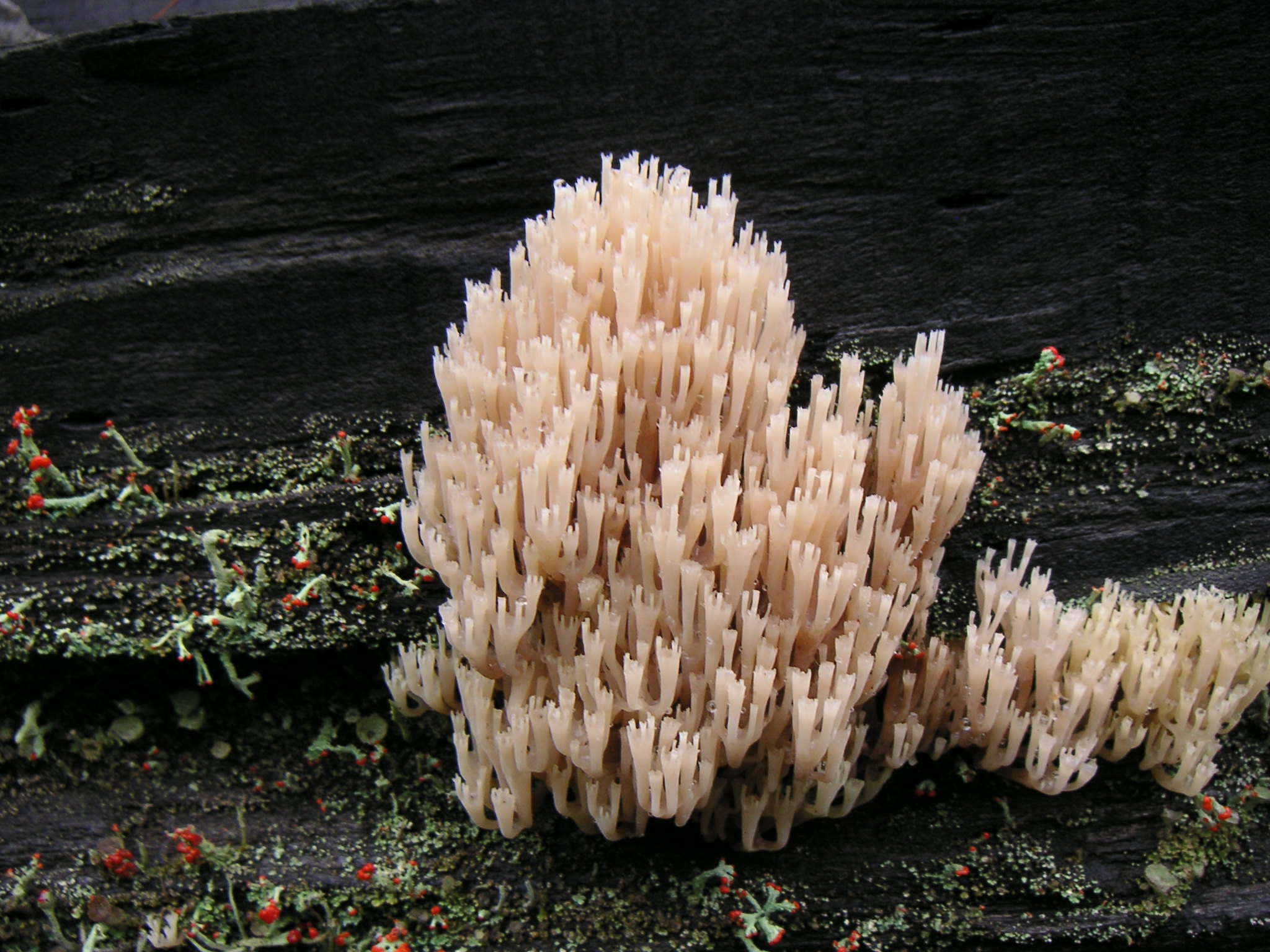
The clavarioid fungus Artomyces pyxidatus, USA

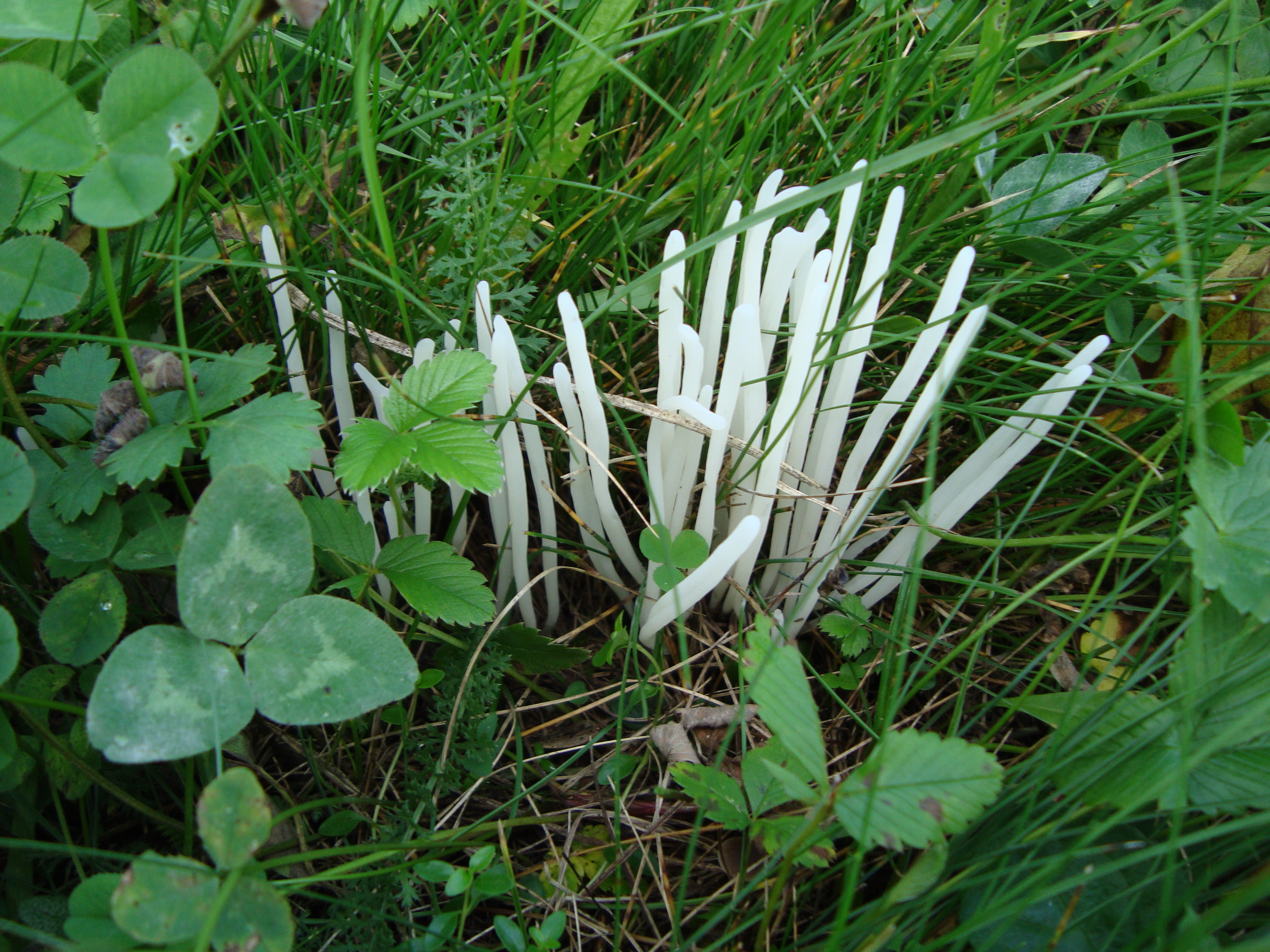
Clavaria fragilis, Austria

Most clavarioid fungi have simple or branched fruit bodies that are erect (or pendant from wood in the genus Deflexula). The spores are born on the sides of the clubs or branches and the spore-bearing surface is typically smooth or ridged, occasionally warted to weakly spiny.

The largest current genus is Ramaria, which has species with branched fruit bodies and ochre to brownish spores. Clavariadelphus, producing large, club-shaped fruit bodies, is closely related. Clavaria in its modern sense is restricted to white-spored species, many simple, some branched. It is not clearly distinguished from two related genera, Clavulinopsis and Ramariopsis. The genus Typhula contains a number of small, sometimes minute species with simple fruit bodies. Smaller genera of clavarioid fungi include Alloclavaria, Aphelaria, Artomyces, Chaetotyphula, Clavariachaete, Clavicorona, Clavulina, Ertzia, Lachnocladium, Lentaria, Lepidostroma, Multiclavula, Pterula, Scytinopogon, and Sulzbacheromyces.

== Habitat and distribution ==
Many clavarioid fungi are saprotrophic with a terrestrial habit, growing in woodland leaf litter or in mossy grassland. A few grow on wood or on decaying herbaceous stems and fallen leaves. Some species, particularly in the genera Clavulina and Ramaria, are known to be ectomycorrhizal (forming a beneficial association with the roots of living trees). Species in the genera Ertzia, Multiclavula, Lepidostroma, and Sulzbacheromyces are lichenized and grow in association with algae.

Clavarioid fungi have a worldwide distribution, though some genera—such as Aphelaria and Lachnocladium—are principally tropical.
