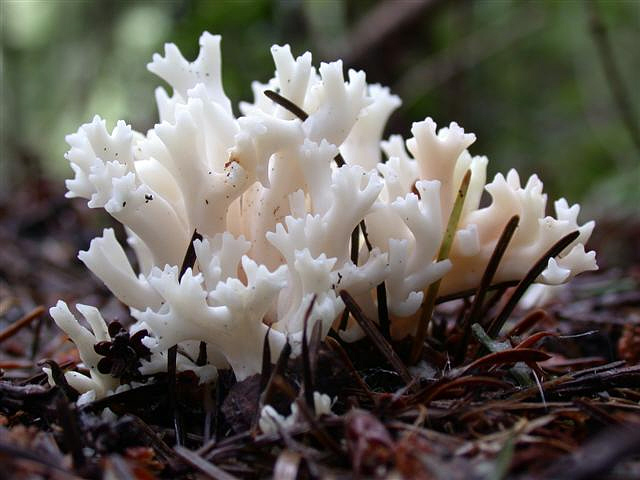
- Clavulina coralloides

Scientific classification
- Kingdom: Fungi
- Division: Basidiomycota
- Class: Agaricomycetes
- Order: Cantharellales
- Family: Clavulinaceae; Donk (1961)

Type genus
- Clavulina J.Schröt. (1888)

Genera
- Burgella; Clavulina; Membranomyces; Multiclavula

= Clavulinaceae =

Family of fungi

The Clavulinaceae are a family of fungi in the order Cantharellales. The family is not well defined, but currently comprises species of clavarioid (club and coral) fungi as well as some corticioid (crust- and patch-forming) fungi. These species are nutritionally diverse, some being ectomycorrhizal, others wood-rotting saprotrophs, others lichenized, and yet others lichenicolous (growing on or parasitizing lichens).

== Taxonomy ==
=== History ===
The Dutch mycologist Marinus Anton Donk first published the tribe Clavulinae in 1933 to accommodate species of clavarioid fungi in the genus Clavulina that had "stichic" basidia (basidia with nuclear spindles arranged longitudinally). He considered this feature placed the species concerned closer to the chanterelles (Cantharellales) than to other clavarioid fungi. In 1961, he raised the tribe to the rank of family, as the Clavulinaceae. In 1968, Estonian mycologist Erast Parmasto added the corticioid genus Clavulicium to the family, noting that it had very similar basidia to those found in Clavulina.

=== Current status ===
Molecular research, based on cladistic analysis of DNA sequences, has confirmed the placement of Clavulina within the Cantharellales, but has not yet addressed the circumscription of the family Clavulinaceae. The corticioid genus Membranomyces (formerly referred to Clavulicium) is closely related. The lichenized clavarioid genus Multiclavula is also closely related and has been included within the family. Several species formerly referred to the corticioid genus Sistotrema may be included, but have not been formally renamed. The genus Burgella, described for a probable anamorph of this latter group is, however, within the family. As such, the Clavulinaceae currently contain 4 genera and over 60 species. The genus Clavulicium which was formerly placed in the Clavulinaceae was found to belong in the new family Stereopsidaceae.

== Distribution and habitat ==
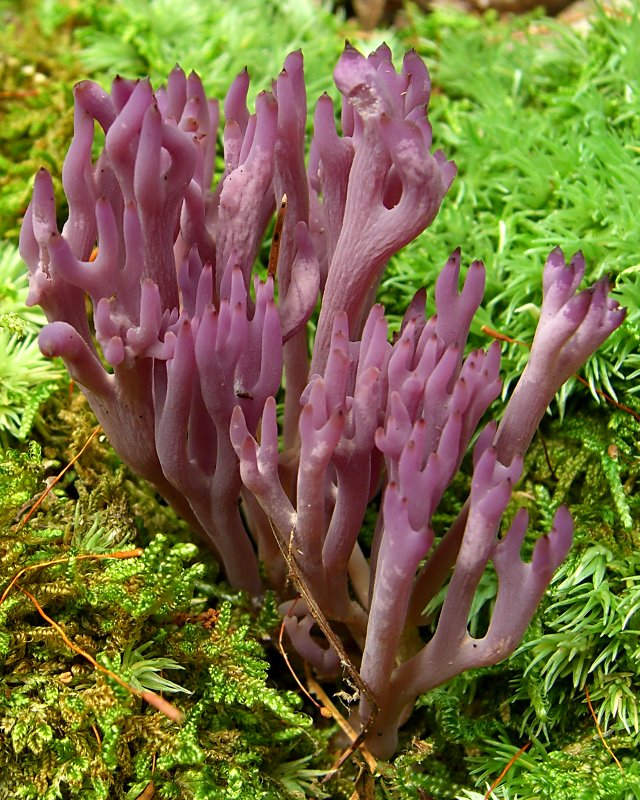
Clavulina amethystina

Species within the family are unusually diverse in habitat and ecology. Species of Clavulina are ectomycorrhizal, forming mutually beneficial associations with the roots of living trees and other plants. Species of Multiclavula are lichens, their basidiocarps typically found scattered on sheets of their associated algae. Species of Membranomyces and "Sistotrema" are presumed to be wood-rotting saprotrophs, typically forming corticioid basidiocarps on the undersides of dead, attached branches or fallen wood. Some of the latter group, however, (including the genus Burgella) often grow on and may parasitize lichens. Collectively, the Clavulinaceae have a cosmopolitan distribution.
