= Brunswick and Pensacola Railroad =

Railroad in Georgia, US

The Brunswick and Pensacola Railroad (BRPC) was constructed by the Suwanee Canal Company between 1895 and 1896. Owned by the Suwannee Canal Company, the railroad ran from Folkston, Georgia, to the Suwanee Canal on the East edge of the Okefenokee Swamp near Camp Cornelia, Georgia.

Despite the name, the railroad never reached Pensacola. When the Suwannee Canal Company went bankrupt in 1897, the railroad collapsed along with it.

Georgia State Route 40 was built along a portion of the former right-of-way for this railroad line.
