= Chesser Island =

Island in Charlton County, Georgia, United States

Coordinates: 30°42′24″N 82°09′44″W

Chesser Island (sometimes called Chessers Island) is an island in the Okefenokee Swamp which is a protected part of the Okefenokee National Wildlife Refuge.

== History ==
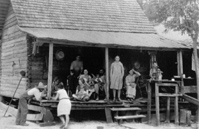
Chesser homestead

In the late 1850s, W.T. Chesser and his family settled a small island on the eastern edge of the Okefenokee Swamp. The Chesser's were a rugged family, carving out a life in the often harsh conditions of the area. Their history is typical of many area settlers; they ate what they could shoot, trap, catch and grow on the sandy soil. Cash crops were primarily sugar cane, tobacco, and turpentine. They lived simply, worked hard, and played hard, when possible.

W.T. Chesser came from the area of Tattnall and Liberty counties in Georgia to settle on the edge of the Okefenokee Swamp. He settled the area currently known as Chesser Island, a 592-acre (2.40 km^{2}) island filled with forests of longleaf pine, slash pine and pond pine in low areas, and an occasional oak hammock.

The original homestead was south of the current buildings. W.T. Chesser had six sons. Son Robert Allen Chesser married Lizzie Altman and had 13 children. Son Sam Chesser married Sara Altman and had nine children. Tom Chesser, the youngest son of Sam and Sara, built the current homestead in 1927, with his wife Iva.

The home is built of yellow pine and reportedly cost $200.00 to build. Originally, the building had four rooms and it featured an indoor kitchen. Bathroom facilities were outside, but a bathtub was located on the back porch. Two bedrooms were added as the family grew to seven children. Outbuildings include a smokehouse, syrup shed, chicken coop, corncrib, and hog pen. The yard retains its original character - it is free of all vegetation, as was the custom of the time to reduce fire danger and increase visibility of snakes.

For the little cash they needed, they grew corn, tobacco, or sugar cane; they also tapped pine trees for turpentine. Work and play often came together - hog butchering and syrup grinding were times when families got together to visit, work, and play.

Typical of families at the time, they told stories, attended church all day on Sunday, and played with toys made at home. The Chessers were fond of a distinctive type of music - four-note or Sacred Harp singing. Chesser descendants continue to sing these primitive, a cappella, harmonies today.

== Chesser Island today ==
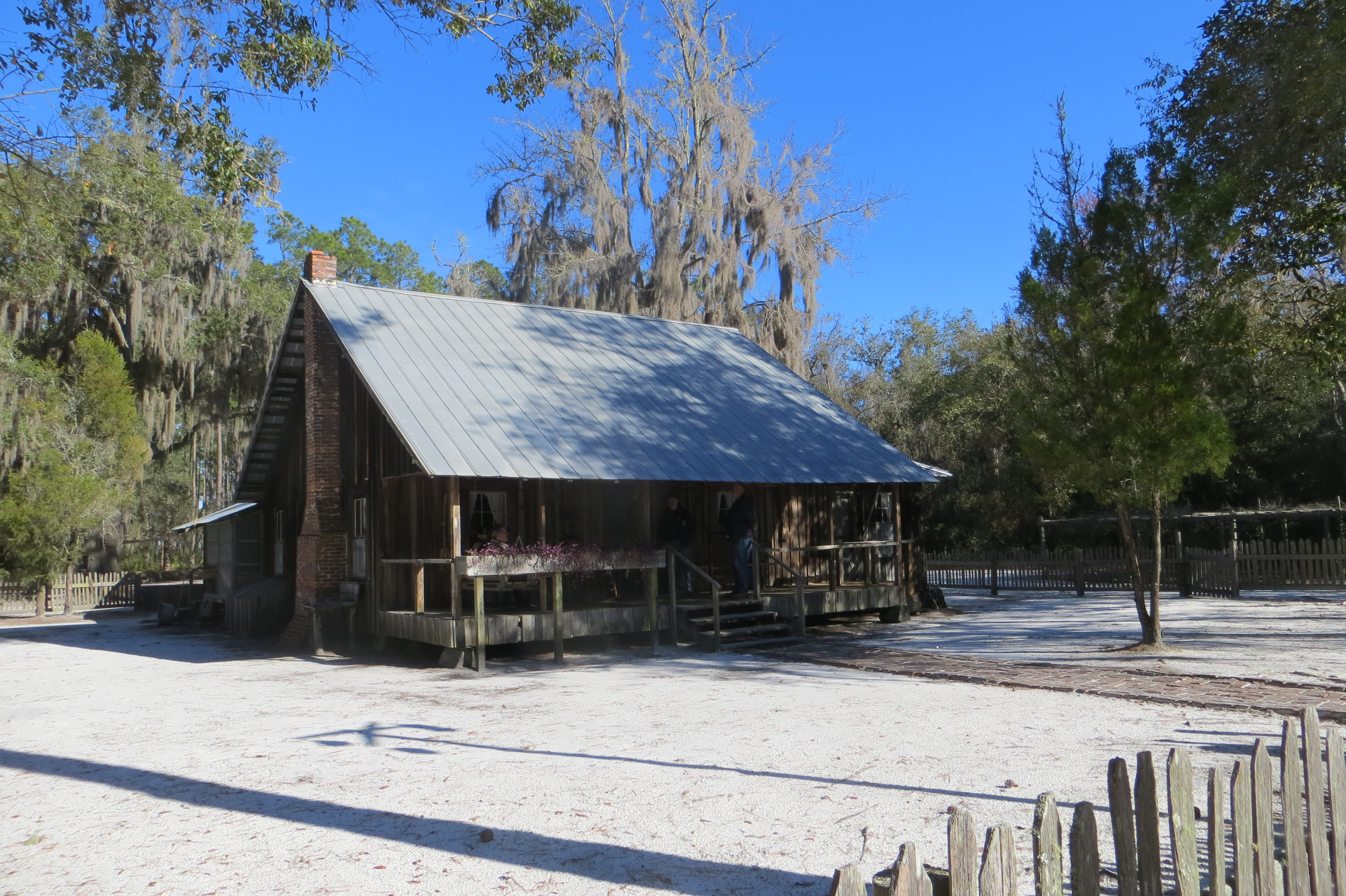
Chesser Island Homestead, 2015

Most of the Okefenokee Swamp became the Okefenokee National Wildlife Refuge in 1937. Slowly, the Chesser family located to other areas. Tom and Iva Chesser were the last family to leave the island, in 1958. Many members of the Chesser family remain nearby in Folkston, Georgia, Waycross, Georgia, and Hollister, Florida. They are involved in the ongoing maintenance and interpretation of the Chesser Island Homestead; some are employed by the U.S. Fish and Wildlife Service in various capacities.
