= Bugaboo Fire =

2007 wildfire in Georgia and Florida, U.S.

Coordinates: 31.191°N 82.510°W

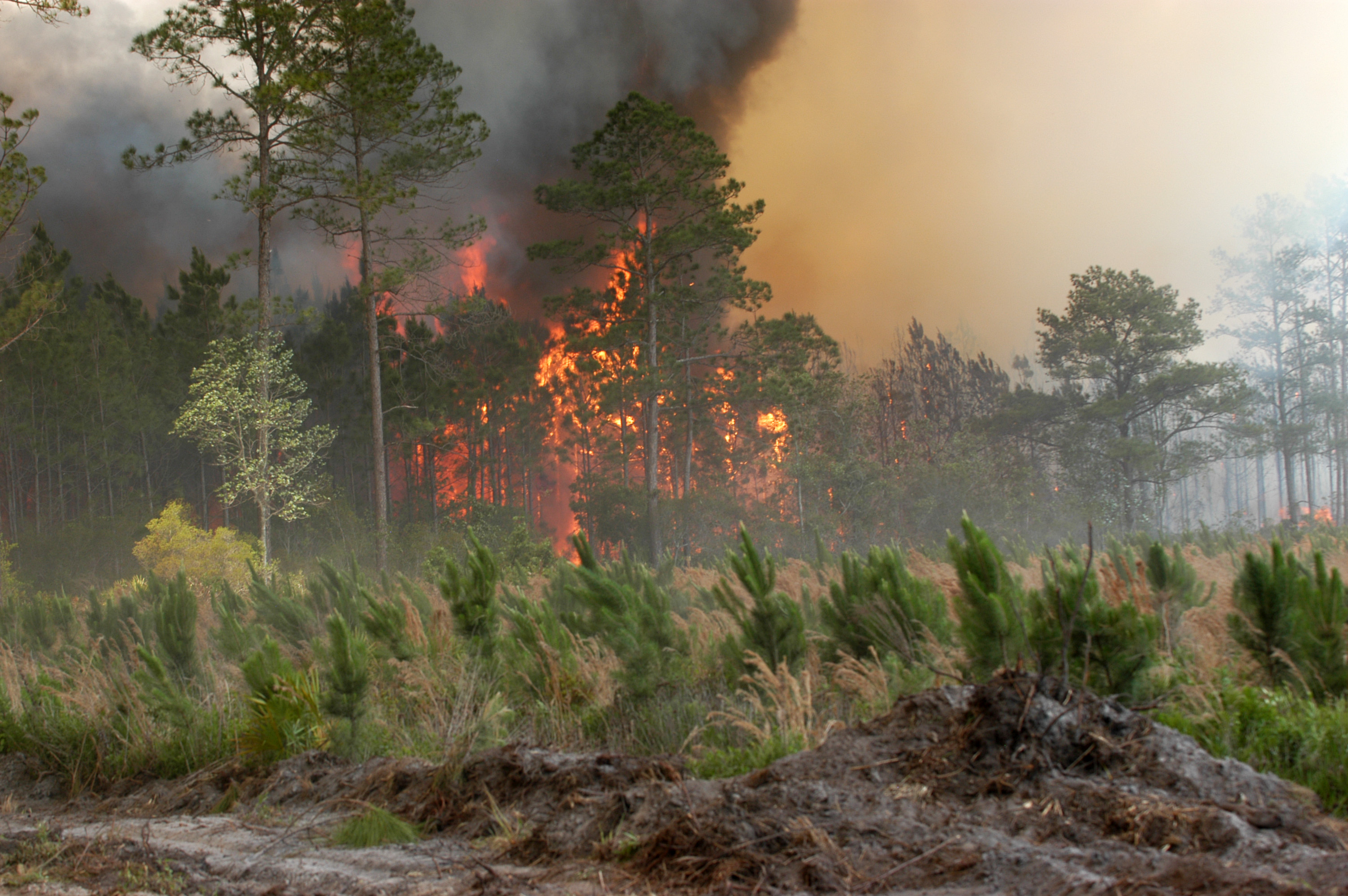
- The Bugaboo Fire rages out of control in Lake City, Florida
- Date: April 2007 – June 2007
- Location: Georgia and Florida

Statistics
- Burned area: 564,450 acres (228,425 ha; 2,284 km^{2}; 882 sq mi)

The Bugaboo Fire was a wildfire that raged from April to June 2007 in the southeastern United States. The Bugaboo, which was named after it had blazed for nearly a month, started in the Okefenokee Swamp and merged with the Sweat Farm Road Fire, ultimately becoming the largest fire in the history of Georgia and Florida and burning over 564,000 acres.

== Georgia ==
On April 16, a downed power line started the Sweat Farm Road Fire southwest of Waycross. When it entered the Okefenokee National Wildlife Refuge on April 21, it was renamed the Big Turnaround Fire. Close by, the Bugaboo Fire was ignited by lightning on May 5. By May 20, the fires converged and became the Georgia Bay Complex.

This fire started when a tree fell on a power line on April 16, during high winds (caused by the April 2007 nor'easter and a strong high-pressure system), and low humidity along with ongoing drought conditions. By April 30, it had burned about 80,000 acres (320 km^{2})—about 20% of which was in the refuge—and had also destroyed 22 homes, and forced the evacuations of over 1,000 people. A fire break 12 miles (19 km) long was bulldozed through the pine forest to protect the city of Waycross, but there were breaches of the line. Georgia Governor Sonny Perdue made a disaster declaration, making Ware and Brantley counties eligible for government aid.

Smoke closed several roads in the area, including U.S. 1.

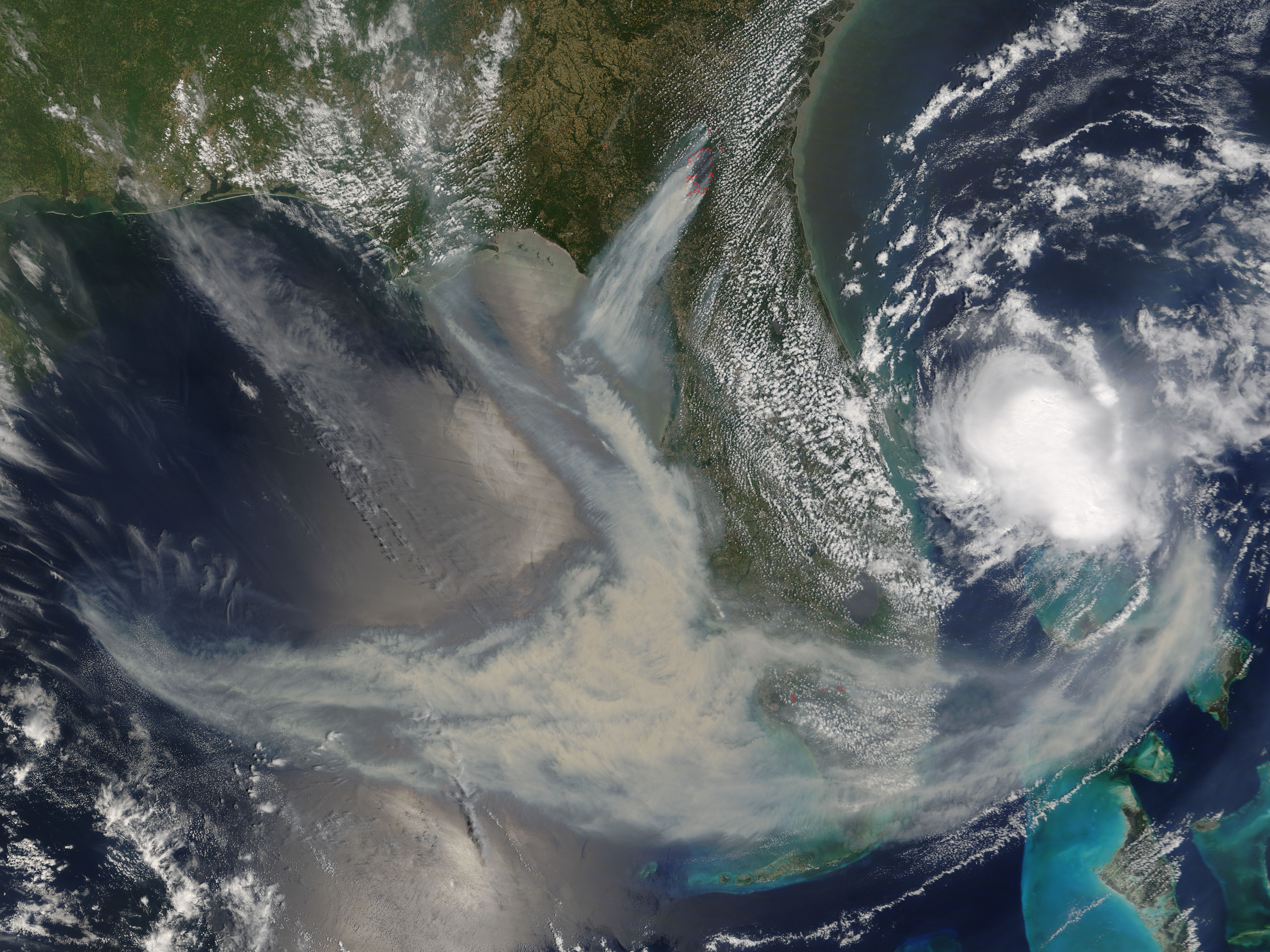
Smoke from the wildfires is swept up by Subtropical Storm Andrea, May 11, 2007 (satellite image from NASA MODIS)

By May 9, the main fire had consumed over 116,000 acres (470 km^{2}), mainly south of Waycross, east of Fargo, and west of Folkston in the Okefenokee National Wildlife Refuge. Many cities were threatened, but were never under siege. Subtropical Storm Andrea—which some had hoped might bring relief—apparently exacerbated the situation, as it drove strong winds into the fire but brought very little rain. These winds may have been the reason that the fire then blew across the border into northeast Florida.

== Florida ==
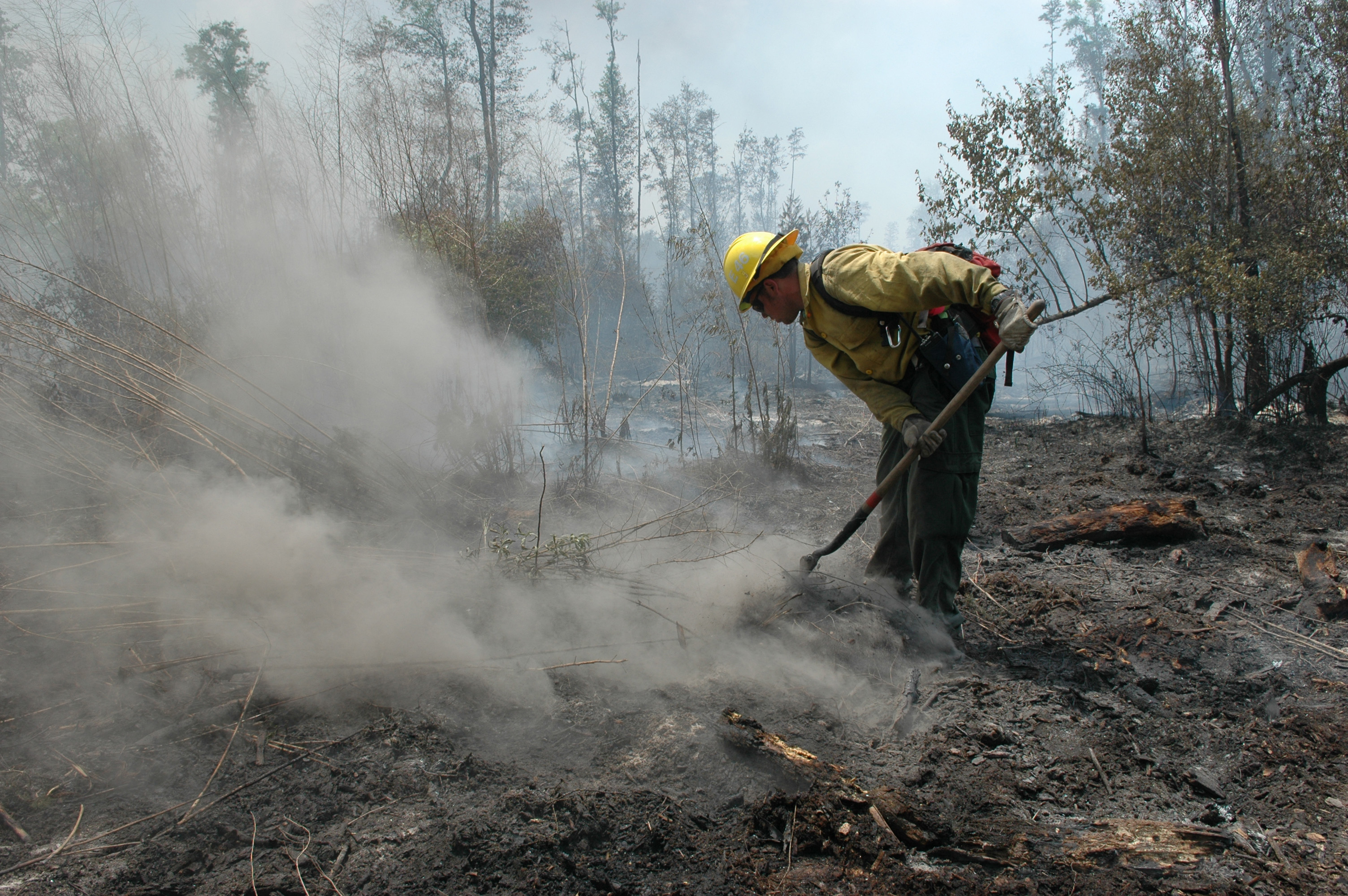
Firefighter in Lake City, Florida, snuffing out smoldering fires, May 15, 2007

On May 5, a lightning strike started the Bugaboo fire at Bugaboo Island in the Okefenokee National Wildlife Refuge, and it soon crept over the state line into Florida, and became the retronymed Bugaboo Scrub fire. It expanded extraordinarily quickly, combining with the other fires that were already blazing in Georgia, and by May 16 had grown to 120,000 acres (490 km^{2}). By May 22, it had burned 475,000 acres (1,920 km^{2}) in Georgia and Florida. By the end of May, 564,450 acres (2,300 km^{2}) had burned. The Florida Folk Festival, the nation's oldest continuous festival, was cancelled for the first time because of the fire, and was later rescheduled for November.

The fire caused closures of Interstate 75 from the state line, and at times as far north as Valdosta, to Interstate 10. Sections of I-10 as long as 40 miles (64 km) were also closed, and parts of U.S. 441 were closed for some time while the fire was just "a mile or two" away from the road. The Georgia State Patrol and Florida Highway Patrol set up a detour which doubled the travel distance between Valdosta and Gainesville from 90 to 180 miles (140 to 290 km) and tripled the time normally required to make the trip.

Hundreds were evacuated from homes in Columbia County, Florida late on May 10, and a state of emergency was declared.

== Smoke ==
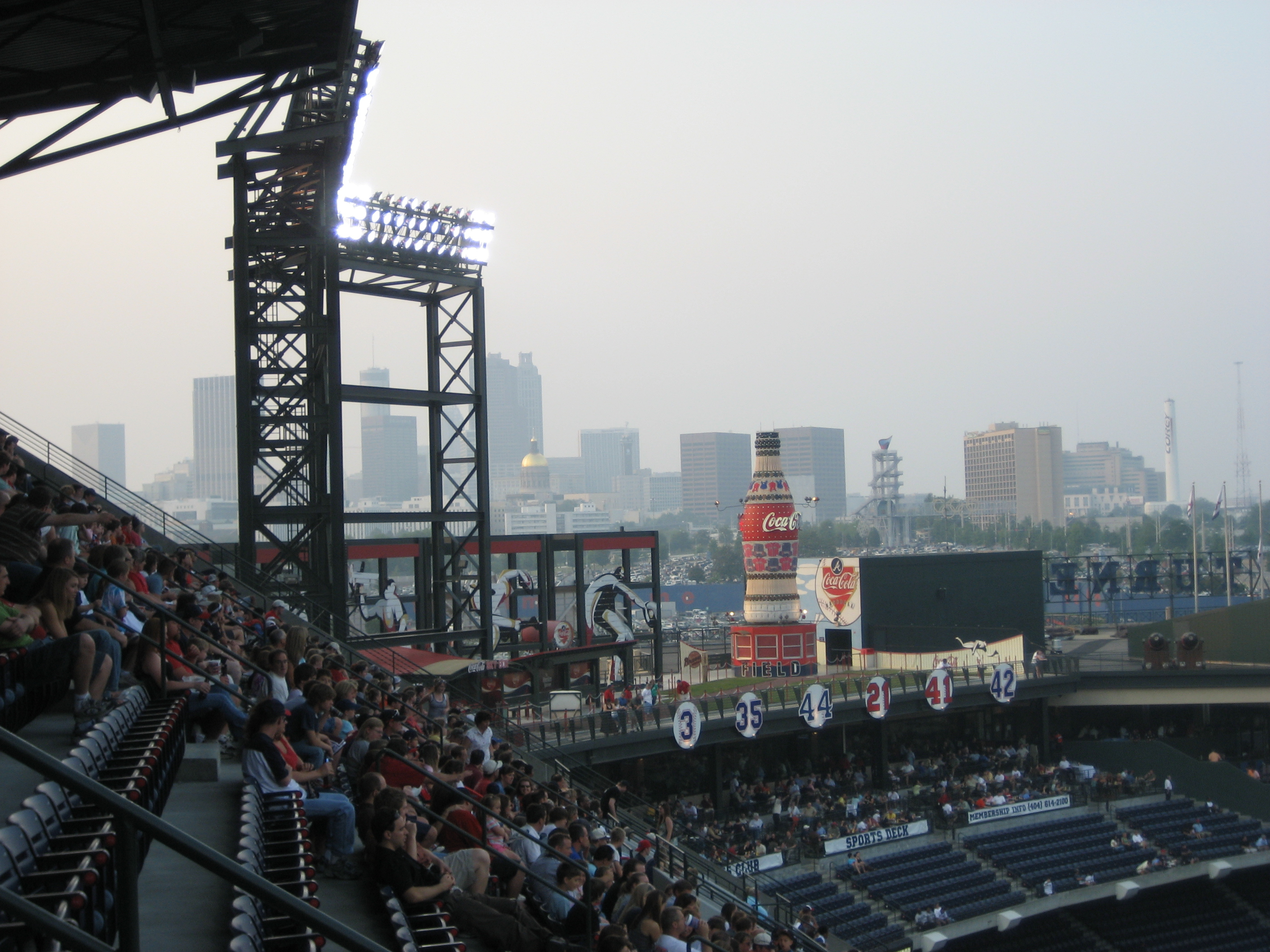
Smoke at an Atlanta Braves game on May 22, 2007

During the time these fires were burning, thick, sooty smoke blanketed the city of Jacksonville, Florida and the entire area of northeast Florida and southeast Georgia for many days. Miami was one of the affected cities. At times, the smoke reduced visibility to under 0.25 miles (0.40 km) and caused many health concerns. The smoke caused disorientation in birds, causing them to fly into buildings. Some highways were closed following vehicle accidents caused by the low visibility conditions.

On May 22, 2007, from southern Georgia to Metro Atlanta, residents awoke to a blanket of smoke across the horizon. Visibility was reduced to 3 to 5 miles (4.8 to 8.0 km). People reported a strong smoke smell and there were further reports of people with irritated eyes, noses, and lungs. People with respiratory issues were advised to stay inside, and some people with asthma were rushed to hospitals as a result of the smoke.

Smoke at times reduced visibility as far south as central Florida, and was blown to Fort Lauderdale, sending the local air quality index into the unhealthy range. Smoke later drifted across southern Alabama and further to Meridian, Mississippi.

== Containment ==
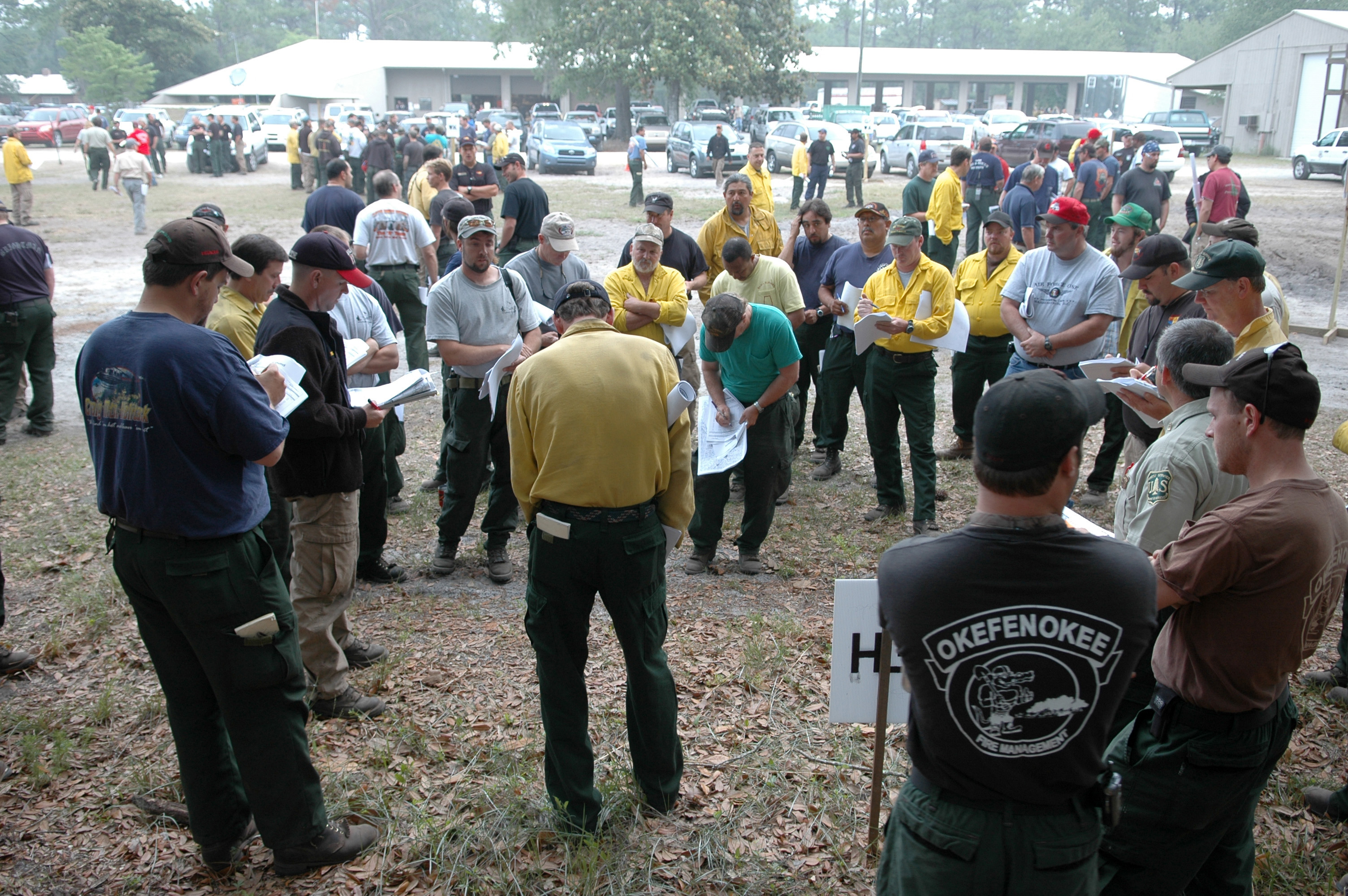
Morning briefing at a Fire Incident Command Post in Charlton County, Georgia

Firefighters came from across the country to help combat the fires. During the firefighting process, crews utilized bulldozers to create fire breaks. The firefighting efforts required "at least 11 helicopters, 62 fire trucks, 26 bulldozers, and more than 500 emergency workers".

By late June, the wildfires in Georgia were largely contained, in part because Tropical Storm Barry brought heavy rain that blanketed the region.

== See also ==
- 2007 North American heat wave
- Bootleg Fire
- Honey Prairie Fire
- List of wildfires
- Weather of 2007
