= Honey Prairie Fire =

2011 wildfire in Okefenokee Swamp, Georgia

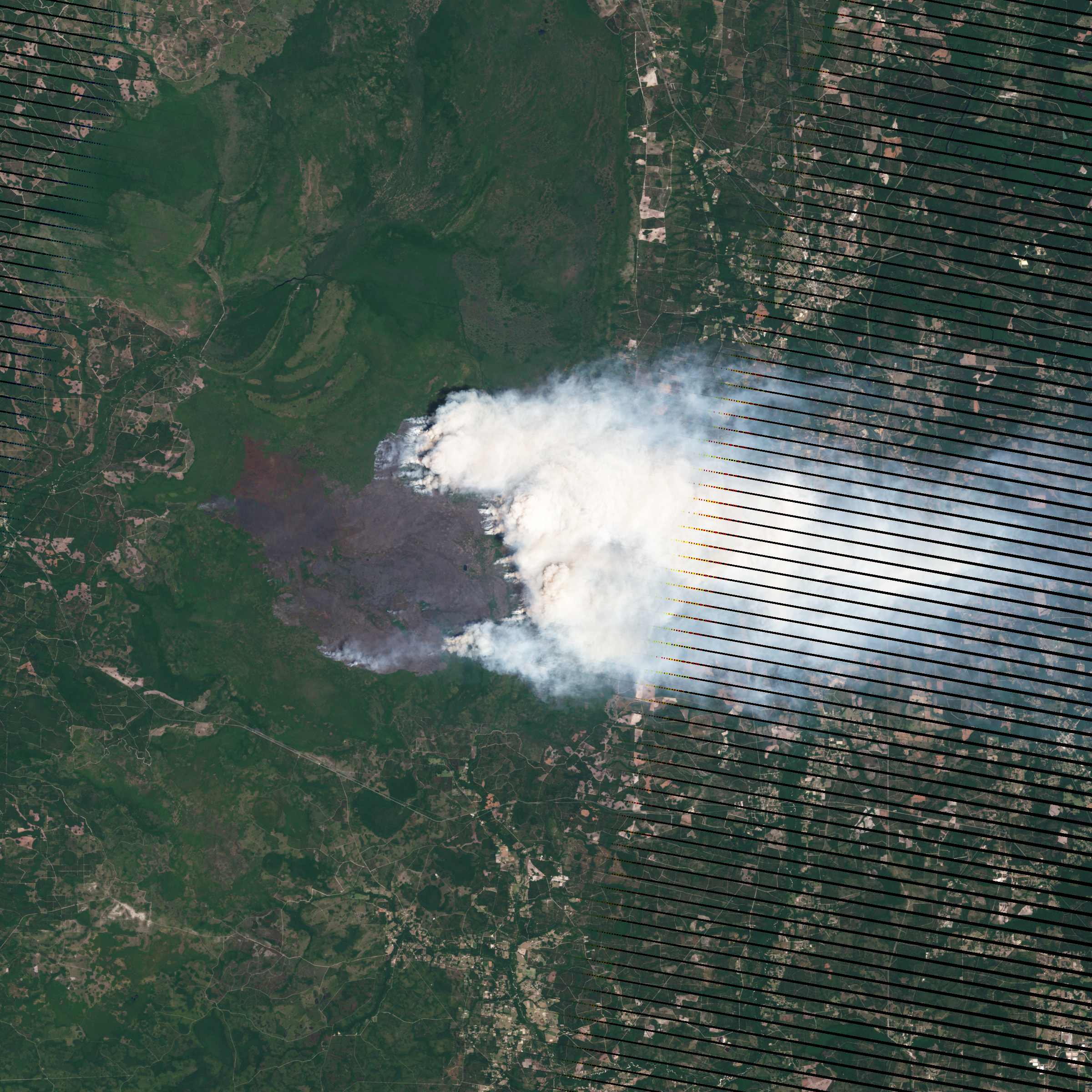
- Satellite image of the Honey Prairie Fire.
- Date: April 30, 2011 – April 16, 2012
- Location: Okefenokee Swamp, Georgia
- Coordinates: 30.73°N 82.369°W

Statistics
- Burned area: 309,200 acres (1,251 km^{2})

Ignition
- Cause: Lightning

Map
- Location within Georgia

The Honey Prairie Fire was a 2011 wildfire that burned 309,200 acres (1,251 km^{2}) of primarily scrub and brush in the Okefenokee Swamp of southern Georgia. Because fire restores the prairie ecosystem, fire managers in the Okefenokee National Wildlife Refuge allowed the fire to burn. Fire fighters worked to preserve structures and keep the fire within the refuge rather than contain the flames.

Lightning started the fire on April 28, and by 6 p.m. on May 8, about 61,822 acres (250.18 km^{2}) had burned. Most of the fire had burned by late July. By the time the fire was officially declared out on April 16, 2012, it had burned a total of 309,200 acres (1,251 km^{2}).
