= Suwannee Canal =

Attempt to drain large portions of the Okefenokee Swamp in Georgia via a canal

- Interactive map of Suwannee Canal
- Country: United States
- Coordinates: 30°44′15.4″N 82°08′29.8″W

Specifications
- Status: Abandoned; survives as waterway

History
- Principal engineer: Suwannee Canal Company
- Date of first use: 1891–1897

Geography
- Start point: Okefenokee Swamp
- End point: St. Marys River (intended)

The Suwannee Canal (also seen as the Suwanee Canel) was an attempt to drain large portions of the Okefenokee Swamp in Georgia via a canal. The spelling of the Suwannee River has changed over time. The single n variant was more common in the past, but the double n spelling is the standard today.

In 1889, the Georgia General Assembly authorized the Governor to sell the land containing the Okefenokee Swamp to the highest bidder. The highest bidder was a group of capitalists and former Confederate officers who offered 26.5 cents per acre for the property. The group was granted a charter as the Suwannee Canal Company in 1890. In January 1891, the new company paid $6,310,180 for 238,120 acres (963.6 km^{2}). The company intended to drain the swamp in order to facilitate logging and eventual crop cultivation.

Work on the drainage ditch from the swamp to the St. Marys River began on September 20, 1891. Captain Henry Jackson, the president of the company, and his crews spent three years digging the Suwannee Canal 11.5 miles (18.5 km) into the swamp. Work was slow due to various problems. The sides of the drainage ditch collapsed because of poor engineering design and bad weather. Leased convict labor, large steam shovels, and finally gold miners from north Georgia using large water hoses were unable to dig the ditch deep enough through an area known as Trail Ridge to drain the swamp.

In 1894, the company built a large sawmill at Camp Cornelia and constructed a railroad from Folkston, Georgia to the mill. The company was one of the first cypress companies in the nation to use industrial logging equipment. A steamboat was used to haul rafts of cypress logs along the canal to the sawmill at Camp Cornelia. Over 7,000,000 feet (2,100,000 m) of lumber were produced and almost 20 miles (32 km) of canals were dredged.

The company had hoped to raise enough money from the lumber to continue the drainage project, but found it impossible to produce the lumber profitably. The market was flooded with lumber, and they could not sell the lumber that was produced at a high enough price. The high cost of freight for lumber that could not be sold began to drain the company's assets. The company borrowed money, but eventually exhausted their funds. The drainage effort was abandoned in October 1894.

On December 13, 1895, Captain Jackson died following an operation for appendicitis. His father, General Henry R. Jackson, was elected president in December 1895. He loaned more money to the company. The company survived until 1897, when Jackson ceased lending money to the company.

The company was placed into receivership in June 1897. The receiver, Joel Hurt, also attempted to operate the company, but found the business to be as unprofitable as before.

Economic recessions led to the company's bankruptcy. In 1899, the property of The Suwannee Canal Company was sold to members of the Jackson family as part of the "Jackson Trust." In 1901, the property was sold by the Jackson Trust to Charles Hebard, a prominent lumberman of Philadelphia and the Hebard Lumber Company of Lowndes County, Georgia.

Logging operations, focusing on cypress, began in 1909 after a railroad was constructed into the west edge of the swamp. Over 431 million board feet (1,020,000 m^{3}) of timber, much of it old-growth cypress, had been removed from the Okefenokee by 1927 when logging operations ceased.

The Suwannee Canal survives as a principal waterway into the swamp, and is enjoyed by thousands of visitors each year.

== See also ==
- List of canals in the United States
- Okefenokee National Wildlife Refuge
- Okefenokee Swamp
