= Tropical Storm Barry (2007) =

Atlantic tropical cyclone

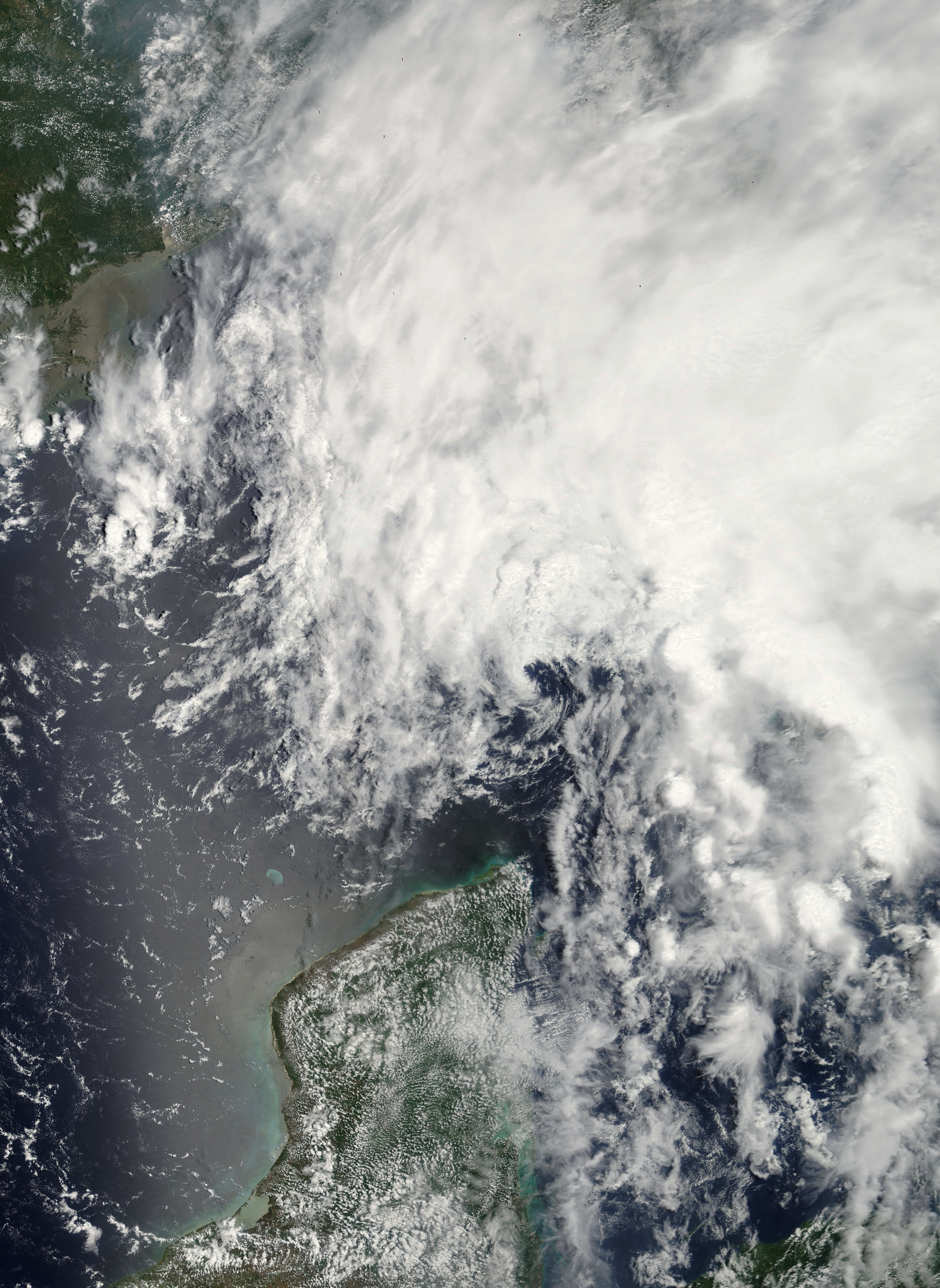
- Tropical Storm Barry shortly after being classified on June 1

Meteorological history
- Formed: June 1, 2007
- Extratropical: June 2, 2007
- Dissipated: June 5, 2007

Tropical storm
- 1-minute sustained (SSHWS/NWS)
- Highest winds: 60 mph (95 km/h)
- Lowest pressure: 997 mbar (hPa); 29.44 inHg

Overall effects
- Fatalities: 1 direct, 2 indirect
- Damage: $118,000 (2007 USD)
- Areas affected: El Salvador, western Cuba, Florida, East Coast of the United States, Atlantic Canada
- IBTrACS
- Part of the 2007 Atlantic hurricane season

Tropical Storm Barry was a rapidly forming tropical cyclone that made landfall on Florida, United States, in early June 2007. The second named storm of the 2007 Atlantic hurricane season, Barry developed from a trough of low pressure in the southeastern Gulf of Mexico on June 1. It tracked rapidly northeastward, reaching peak winds of 60 mph (97 km/h) before weakening and making landfall near Tampa Bay as a tropical depression. Barry quickly lost tropical characteristics after wind shear removed much of the convection, and early on June 3, it completed the transition into an extratropical cyclone. The extratropical remnants tracked up the East Coast of the United States, and were absorbed by a larger extratropical cyclone on June 5.

The precursor trough produced heavy rainfall across the western Caribbean Sea, which on Cuba unofficially reached over 7.8 inches (200 mm). Outer rainbands in Pinar del Río Province injured three people and damaged 55 houses. In Florida, Barry dropped a moderate amount of precipitation across the drought-ridden state; rainfall peaked at 6.99 inches (178 mm). The rain caused some flooding and wet roads, which led to two indirect traffic fatalities. Rough seas killed one Florida surfer in Pinellas County. In Florida and Georgia, the precipitation assisted firefighters in combating severe wildfires. Overall damage from the storm was minor.

== Meteorological history ==
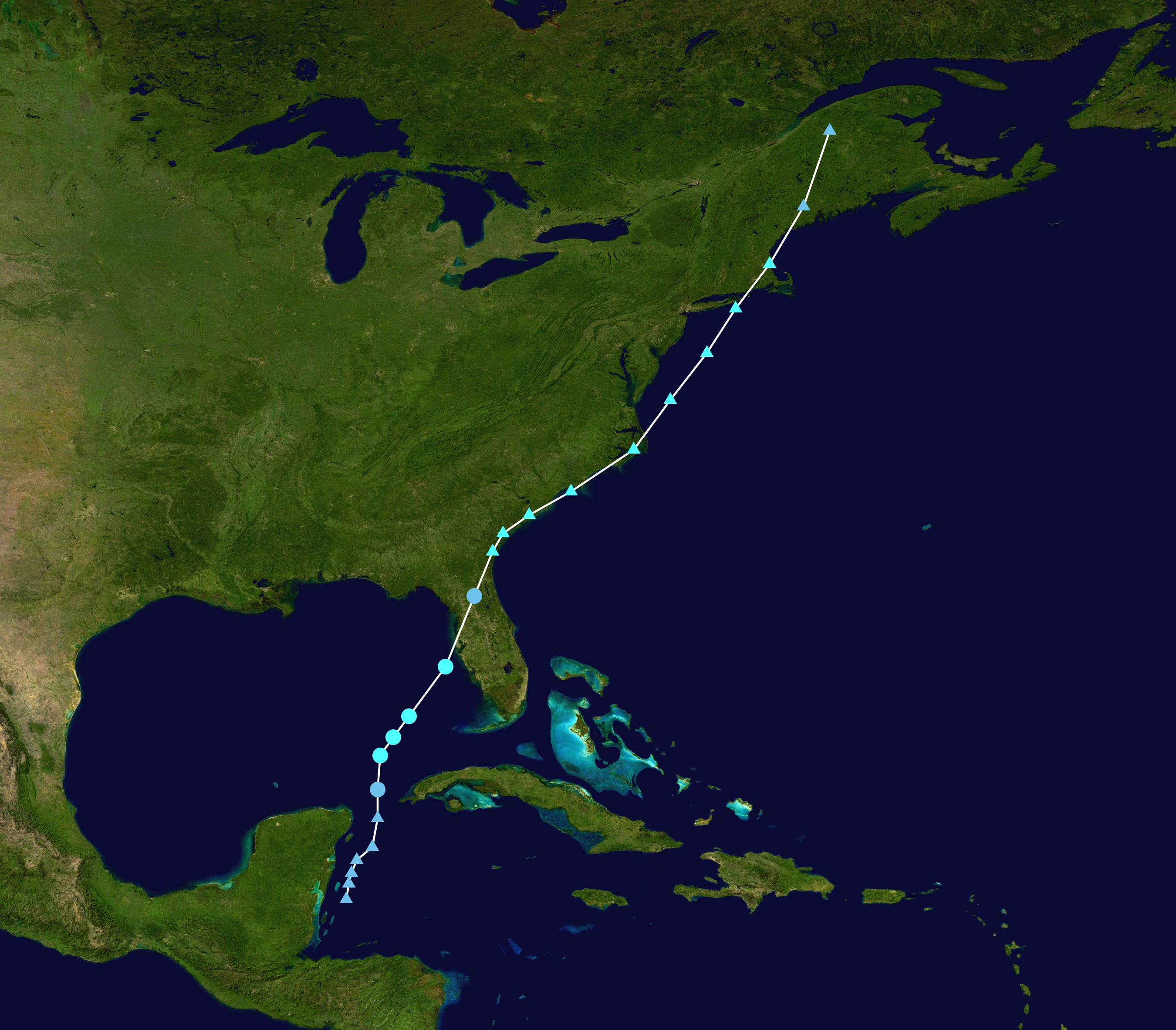
Map plotting the storm's track and intensity, according to the Saffir–Simpson scale Map key Saffir–Simpson scale Tropical depression (≤38 mph, ≤62 km/h) Tropical storm (39–73 mph, 63–118 km/h) Category 1 (74–95 mph, 119–153 km/h) Category 2 (96–110 mph, 154–177 km/h) Category 3 (111–129 mph, 178–208 km/h) Category 4 (130–156 mph, 209–251 km/h) Category 5 (≥157 mph, ≥252 km/h) Unknown Storm type Tropical cyclone Subtropical cyclone Extratropical cyclone, remnant low, tropical disturbance, or monsoon depression

By late on May 29, a weak trough over the Yucatán Peninsula produced a small area of convection over the Yucatán Channel. Convection increased in association with the trough, and the next day a broad envelope of cyclonic turning developed within the system. By May 30, the moisture from the trough extended from Nicaragua through the southeastern Gulf of Mexico, with the greatest area of convection near Cuba. A westward moving tropical wave spawned a broad area of low pressure on May 30, and by May 31, a circulation had developed within the system to the southeast of Cozumel, Mexico. The low moved north-northeastward, and gradually became better organized despite high amounts of vertical wind shear. The deep convection became more concentrated near the center, and it is estimated the system developed into a tropical depression at 12:00 UTC on June 1, just to the northwest of the western tip of Cuba. Operationally, the system was not classified until eleven hours later.

Animated radar image from Tampa of Tropical Storm Barry passing through Florida on June 2

The depression developed a large area of squalls, and organized enough to warrant a Hurricane Hunters flight into the area. The plane reported flight level winds of 60 mph (97 km/h) and a central pressure of 1000 mbar near the increasingly well-defined low-level circulation. Initially it maintained characteristics of both a tropical and subtropical cyclone, although deep convection continued to organize near the center; based on the observations, the National Hurricane Center initiated advisories on Tropical Storm Barry at 21:00 UTC on June 1, while the storm was centered about 235 miles (378 km) west of Key West, Florida. Embedded within the southwesterly flow ahead of an approaching mid-level trough, it tracked quickly northward, and early on June 2, Barry attained peak winds of 60 mph (97 km/h), with a minimum central pressure of 997 millibars (29.4 inHg).

Shortly after reaching peak intensity, strong wind shear removed most of the deep convection; the cloud pattern consisted of an exposed yet well-defined center surrounded by a curved convective band extending from Cuba along the eastern Gulf of Mexico. The center became elongated and weakened as it accelerated northeastward, and at 14:00 UTC on June 2, Barry made landfall near Tampa, Florida, as a weakening tropical depression. As the system continued inland, it rapidly lost tropical characteristics, and later that day the National Hurricane Center discontinued advisories on Barry, while it was located over northeastern Florida. The extratropical remnants strengthened, as the system continued northeastward, and on June 3, the storm moved ashore along the coast of South Carolina. Spiral bands developed to the north of the system as it moved up the coast, and a large plume of moisture extended well ahead of the low-level circulation. At 00:00 UTC on June 4, Barry's extratropical remnants reached an extratropical peak intensity of 990 millibars (29 inHg). Late on June 4, the extratropical remnant entered New England, and late on June 5, the remnants of Barry were absorbed by a larger extratropical cyclone near the border between the U.S. state of Maine and the Canadian province of Quebec.

== Preparations ==
Tropical Depression Barry shortly after landfall in Florida on June 2

Coinciding with its classification as a tropical storm, the National Hurricane Center issued a tropical storm warning for the west coast of Florida from Bonita Beach through Keaton Beach, with a tropical storm watch declared from Keaton Beach northward to Saint Marks. An inland tropical storm warning was also issued for non-coastal and non-tidal areas of Charlotte, Citrus, DeSoto, Hardee, Hernando, Highlands, Lee, Levy, Manatee, Pasco, Pinellas, Polk, Sarasota, and Sumter counties. The passage of the storm resulted in an increased threat for rip currents, with officials recommending that swimmers stay out of the water until the storm leaves the area. A tornado watch was also posted for the southern portion of the state, though was dropped after the storm weakened.

After becoming an extratropical cyclone, local National Weather Service offices issued flood watches for portions of South Carolina, much of eastern North Carolina, southeastern Virginia, and southeastern Maryland. Later, flood and flash flood watches were issued for southeast Pennsylvania, northern Delaware, northern New Jersey, east-central New York, and southern New England. Wind and lake wind advisories were posted in parts of Georgia.

== Impact ==
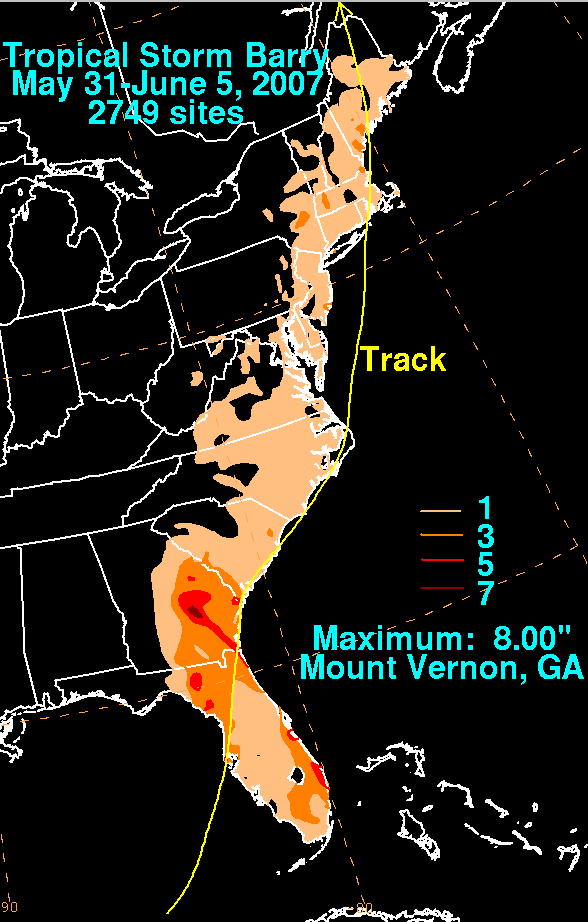
Rainfall Summary for Tropical Storm Barry

=== Caribbean ===
In El Salvador, the precursor trough produced about 2.76 inches (70 mm) of rainfall in about ten hours.

The precursor system dropped heavy rainfall across western Cuba, peaking at 12.0 inches (300 mm) in Sancti Spíritus Province. Several other locations recorded over 4 inches (100 mm) of precipitation, which caused flooding along rivers and low-lying areas. The city of Guane was isolated after flooding cut off communications. In total, more than 2,000 people were evacuated due to the threat for flooding. Additionally, the precursor disturbance spawned four tornadoes in Pinar del Río Province; the tornadoes injured three people and damaged fifty-five houses, of which four collapsed.

=== United States ===
==== Florida ====
Barry dropped moderate to heavy rainfall across Florida, peaking at 6.99 inches (178 mm) at Palm Beach International Airport; several other locations reported over 3 inches (76 mm). The rainfall alleviated persistent drought conditions and assisted in combating severe wildfires across the state. In Brevard County, the rainfall closed a portion of Eau Gallie Boulevard after a large sinkhole developed. Several other roads across the area were flooded, and on Interstate 95 near Lake Worth, a sinkhole closed two lanes of traffic. Wet roads caused several traffic accidents across the state; in both Brevard and Volusia counties, a motorist was killed from an accident. On Interstate 4, a tractor trailer led to disruptions near Orlando after it crashed into a guardrail.

Rainfall maxima by state
Location	Peak	
Location	inch	mm
West Palm Beach, Florida	6.99	178
Mount Vernon, Georgia	8.00	203
Near Hardeeville, South Carolina	6.12	156
Fuquay-Varina, North Carolina	3.73	94.7
Pennington Gap, Virginia	3.75	95.3
Frostburg, Maryland	1.70	43.2
Dover, Delaware	1.54	39.1
Philadelphia, Pennsylvania	1.66	42.2
Absecon, New Jersey	4.50	114
Central Park, New York	3.91	99.3
Berlin, Connecticut	2.90	73.7
Taunton, Massachusetts	3.19	81.0
Burrillville, Rhode Island	3.10	78.7
Newmarket, New Hampshire	2.75	69.9
Saco, Maine	2.64	67.1

The storm produced heavy surf along the western coastline, as well as a storm tide of 4.78 feet (1.46 m) at Clearwater Beach. The wave action caused minor beach erosion, with 50–60 feet (15–18 m) of sand washed away at Bradenton Beach. The increased ocean action caused minor flooding along several roads in the Tampa Bay area, which trapped some automobile travelers. At Indian Shores, a woman died after sustaining injuries from the rough surf.

High winds across the state included a report of 47 mph (76 km/h) near the state's southeastern coastline. The winds downed some trees and resulted in power outages, and one person in Carrolwood was injured after a tree fell onto a house. The storm spawned several tornadoes in the southern portion of the state, some of which damaged fences and power lines. One possible tornado in Goulds left about 2,000 people without power after it knocked down a power line. Another tornado near Miami damaged a few homes and trees.

==== Elsewhere ====
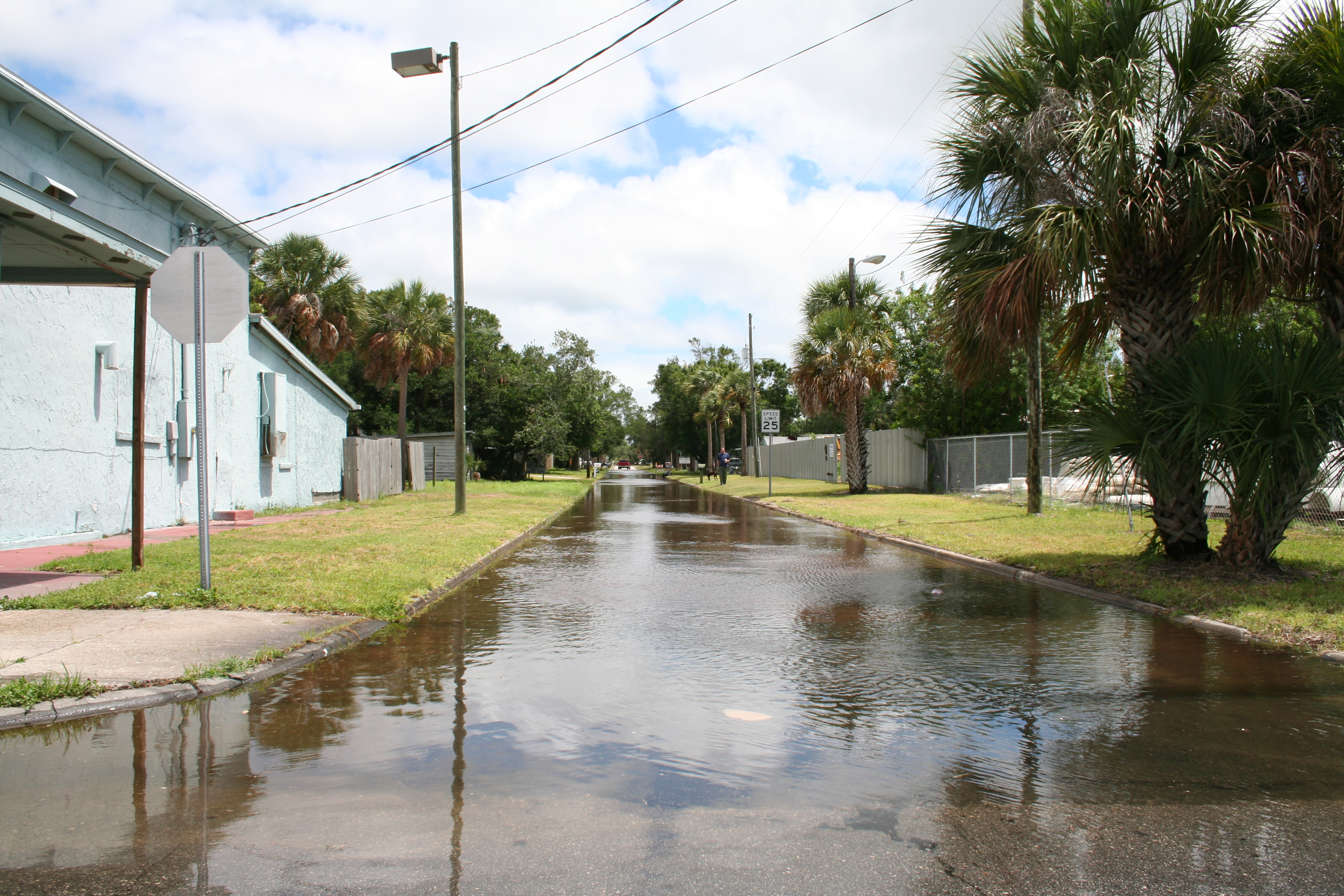
Minor street flooding from Barry in Florida

Rainfall in Georgia peaked at 8 inches (200 mm) in Mount Vernon. The precipitation assisted firefighters in combating wildfires in the southern portion of the state, which gave thousands of workers a brief respite after they had fought the fires daily for over a month. The rainfall caused some minor flooding, and in Savannah a few minor traffic accidents occurred. Gusty winds blew down trees and power lines, and along the coast, rough surf was reported. Heavy rainfall from the storm spread across much of the East Coast of the United States. State totals peaked at 6.12 inches (155 mm) near Hardeeville, South Carolina, 3.73 inches (95 mm) in Fuquay-Varina, North Carolina, and 3.75 inches (95 mm) near Pennington Gap, Virginia. High winds also occurred in South Carolina.

The extratropical remnants of Barry produced gusty winds along the Atlantic coastline which peaked at 60 mph (97 km/h) near Charleston, South Carolina. Around 200 houses in Craven County, North Carolina, were without power after winds downed a power line. In North Carolina, adverse conditions from the storm delayed an elimination baseball game between the East Carolina University and Western Carolina University teams. In southeastern Virginia, the remnants of Barry caused over 60 traffic accidents, which resulted in 10 injuries. Rough seas off of Cape Fear left a sailboat containing three people requiring rescue from the Coast Guard. Rainfall extended into the Mid-Atlantic states through New England, with 4.50 inches (114 mm) reported at Absecon, New Jersey, 3.91 inches (99 mm) recorded near Central Park, New York, and 3.19 inches (81 mm) at Taunton, Massachusetts. The remnants of Tropical Storm Barry contributed to heavy rainfall and flooding in the Finger Lakes region of New York State. Roads and several driveways were washed out. Flash flooding was also reported in southeast New York, and high wind gusts caused sporadic tree damage. In New Jersey, northeast onshore flow associated with the remnants of Barry produced high tides and minor coastal flooding.

== See also ==
- List of Florida hurricanes (2000–present)
- List of New England hurricanes
- List of New Jersey hurricanes
- List of New York hurricanes
- List of North Carolina hurricanes (2000–present)
- Timeline of the 2007 Atlantic hurricane season
- Other storms of the same name
- Tropical Storm Alberto (2006)
- Tropical Storm Andrea (2013)
- Tropical Storm Colin (2016)
