= Suwannee Canal Company =

1890 company chartered in Georgia, U.S.

Coordinates: 30.7399°N 82.1275°W

Chartered in 1890, the Suwannee Canal Company (also seen as the Suwanee Canal Company) had attempted to drain the Okefenokee Swamp. The company had hoped that they could sell the drained land for various agricultural plantations. The company also built a cypress lumber sawmill and the Brunswick and Pensacola Railroad to haul the lumber. The company went bankrupt in 1897.

== History ==
There was an early attempt to survey and sell land in the Okekenokee swamp through a Georgia state land in the early 1800s, though many of these lots were not claimed. Starting in the early 1850s, various land speculators attempted acquisition of swap land from Georgia, yet most of these contracts were never completed and the land reverted to the state. In 1889, the Georgia Legislature approved a plan to auction the swamp and requested bids for the state land on March 18, 1890. The winning bid of 26.5 cents per acre was tendered by syndics Henry Jackson, Frank Coxe, Marshall A. Phillips, H.S. Little, and PMB Young, who incorporated as the Suwannee Canal Company.

== Bibliography ==
- Trowell, C.T.; Izlar, R.L. (1984). "Jackson's Folly: The Suwanee Canal Company in the Okefenokee Swamp" (PDF). Journal of Forest History. 28 (4): 187–195.
