= Okefenokee National Wildlife Refuge =

Nature center in Folkston, Georgia, US

- IUCN category IV (habitat/species management area)
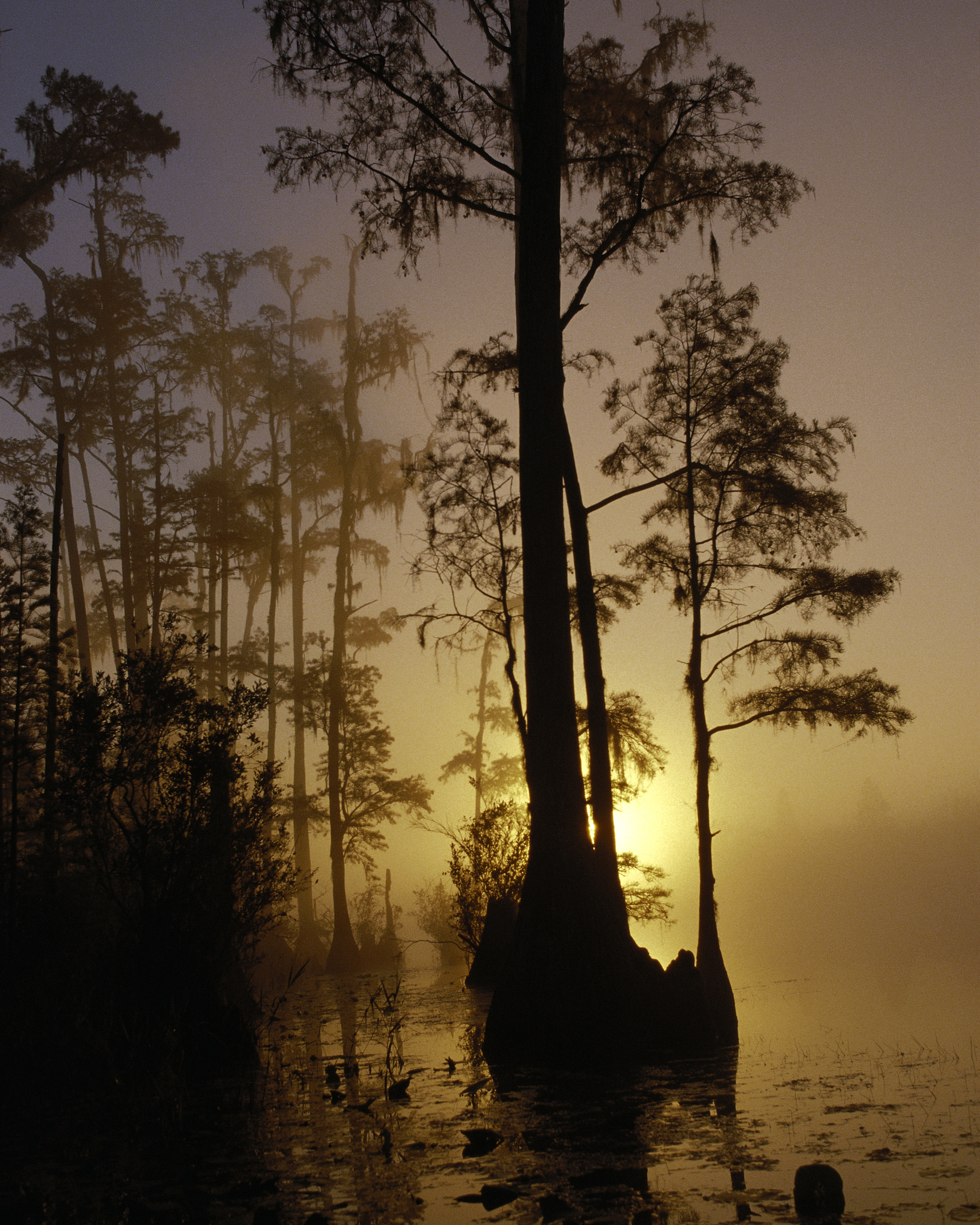
- Sunset in the swamplands of Okefenokee National Wildlife Refuge in Georgia

- Location within the United States
- Location: Georgia and Florida, United States
- Nearest city: Folkston, Georgia
- Coordinates: 30°44′11″N 82°07′19″W
- Area: 402,000 acres (1,630 km^{2})
- Established: 1937
- Visitors: 400,000 (in 2007)
- Governing body: U.S. Fish and Wildlife Service
- Website: Okefenokee National Wildlife Refuge

Ramsar Wetland
- Designated: 18 December 1986
- Reference no.: 350

UNESCO World Heritage Site
- Criteria: Natural: ix, x
- Reference: 1751
- Inscription: 2026 (48th Session)

The Okefenokee National Wildlife Refuge is a 402,000‑acre (1,627 km^{2}) National Wildlife Refuge located in Charlton, Ware, and Clinch Counties of Georgia, and Baker County in Florida, United States. The refuge is administered from offices in Folkston, Georgia. The refuge was established in 1937 to protect a majority of the 438,000 acres (1,770 km^{2}) in the Okefenokee Swamp. The name "Okefenokee", often translated as "land of trembling earth", is likely derived from Hitchiti oki fanôːki ("bubbling water").

Nearly 400,000 people visit the refuge each year, making it the 16th most visited refuge in the National Wildlife Refuge System. It is the largest of any that is not located in a western state. In 1999, the economic impact of tourism in Charlton, Ware, and Clinch Counties in Georgia exceeded $67 million. The refuge has a staff of 16 with a fiscal year 2005 budget of $1,451,000. The refuge also administers the Banks Lake National Wildlife Refuge.

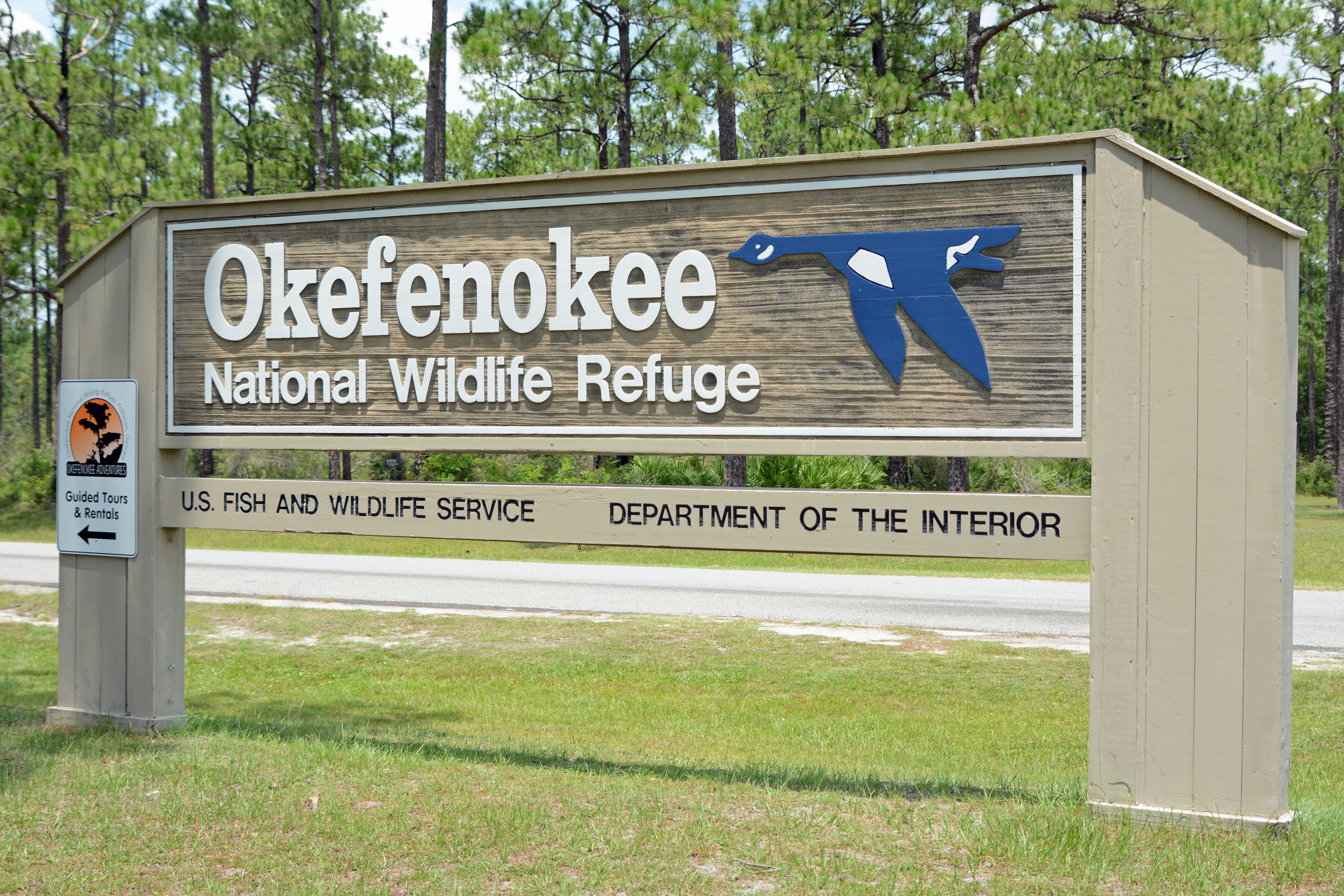
Sign at an entrance to the Okefenokee National Wildlife Refuge.

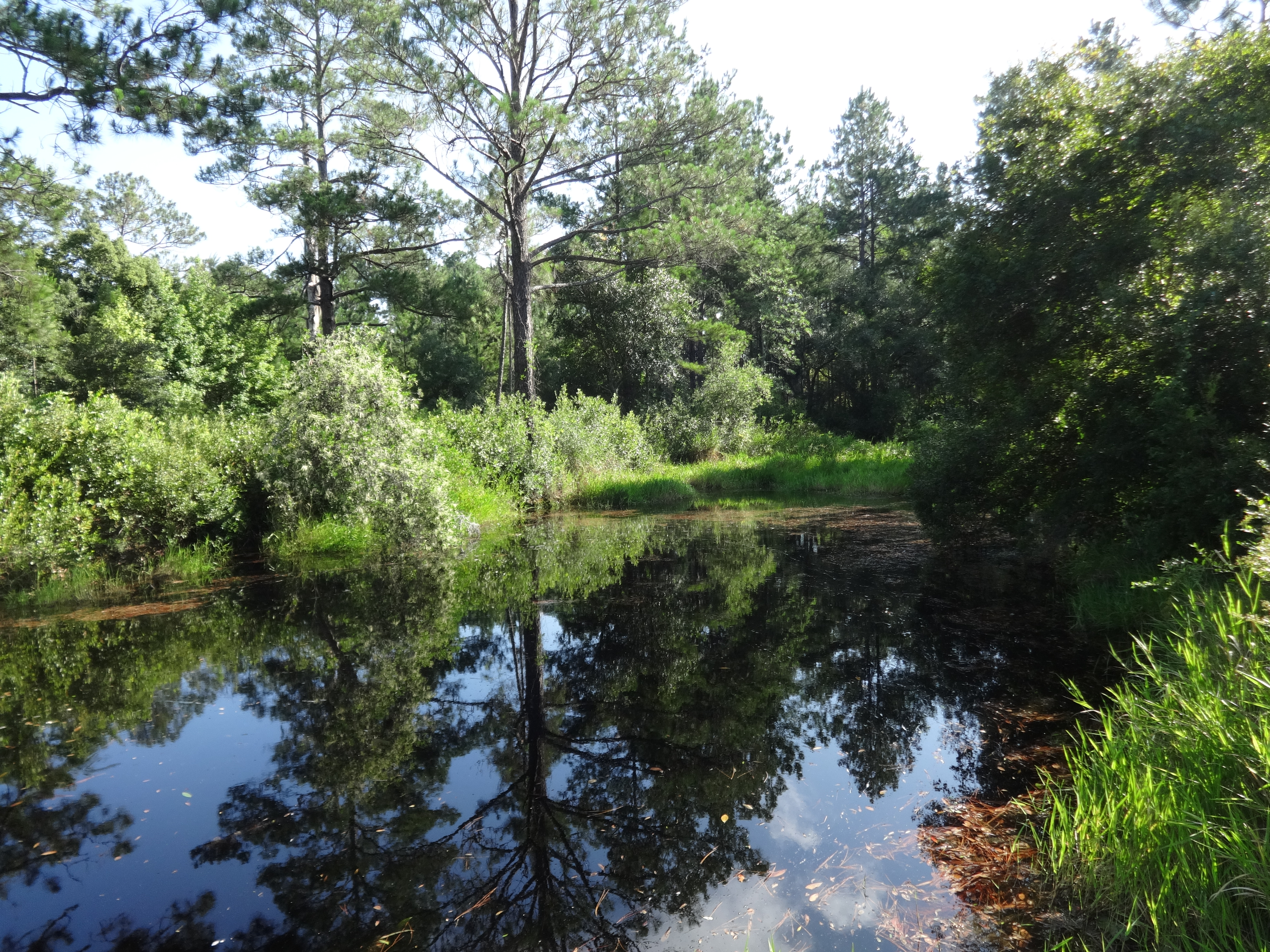
Kingfisher Landing

== History ==
The swamp has a rich human history including Native American settlement, explorations by Europeans, a massive drainage attempt, and intensive timber harvesting.

Native Americans inhabited Okefenokee Swamp as early as 2500 BC. Peoples of the Deptford Culture, the Swift Creek Culture and the Weeden Island Culture occupied sites within the Okefenokee. The last tribe to seek sanctuary in the swamp were the Seminoles. Troops led by General Charles Rinaldo Floyd during the Second Seminole War, 1838–1842, ended the age of the Native Americans in the Okefenokee.

The Suwannee Canal Company purchased 238,120 acres (963.6 km^{2}) of the Okefenokee Swamp from the State of Georgia in 1891 to drain the swamp for rice, sugar cane, and cotton plantations. When this failed, the company began industrial wetland logging as a source of income. Captain Henry Jackson and his crews spent three years digging the Suwannee Canal 11.5 miles (18.5 km) into the swamp.

Economic recessions led to the company's bankruptcy and eventual sale to Charles Hebard in 1901. Logging operations, focusing on the cypress, began in 1909 after a railroad was constructed on the northwest area of the swamp. More than 431 million board feet (1,020,000 m^{3}) of timber were removed from the Okefenokee by 1927, when logging operations ceased.

The Okefenokee Preservation Society, formed in 1918, promoted nationwide interest in the swamp. With the support of state and local interests and numerous conservation and scientific organizations, the Federal Government acquired most of the swamp for refuge purposes in 1936.

In 1937, with Executive Order 7593 (later amended by Executive Order 7994), President Franklin Delano Roosevelt established the refuge, designating it as "a refuge and breeding ground for migratory birds and other wildlife". The establishment of Okefenokee Refuge in 1937 marked the culmination of a movement that had been initiated at least 25 years earlier by a group of scientists from Cornell University who recognized the educational, scientific, and recreational values of this unique area.

In 1974, to further ensure the protection of this unique ecosystem, the interior sections of the refuge were designated a Wilderness Area.

In 1986, the Okefenokee Refuge was designated by the Wetlands Convention as a Wetland of International Importance.

A wildfire which began with a lightning strike near the center of the Refuge on May 5, 2007, merged with another wildfire that had begun near Waycross, Georgia on April 16 due to a tree falling on a power line. The combined wildfires were called the Bugaboo Fire. By May 28, more than 580,000 acres (2,300 km^{2}) had burned in the region, or more than 900 square miles (2,300 km^{2}).

In September 2023, the National Park Service announced that the Okefenokee National Wildlife Refuge would be nominated as Georgia's first World Heritage Site. In July 2026, UNESCO designated the refuge as a World Heritage Site during the 48th session of the World Heritage Committee in Busan, South Korea.

== Geography ==
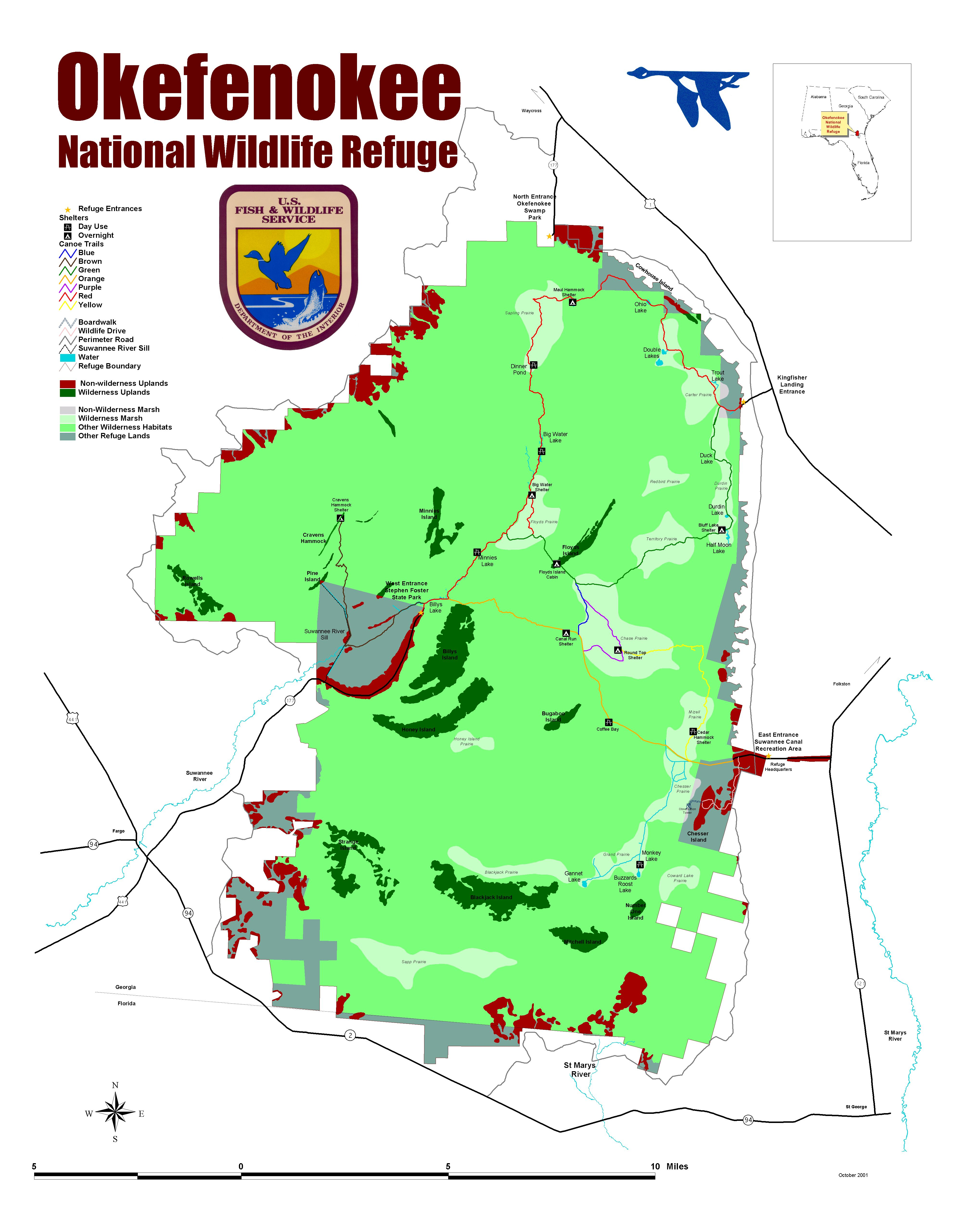
Map of Okefenokee NWR

Okefenokee NWR has an approved acquisition boundary of 519,480 acres (2,102.3 km^{2}), which is 123,480 acres (499.7 km^{2}) larger than its current area. Approximately 371,000 acres (1,500 km^{2}) of the Okefenokee Swamp wetlands are incorporated into the refuge. 353,981 acres (1,432.51 km^{2}) within the swamp were designated as the Okefenokee Wilderness, a part of the National Wilderness Preservation System when the Okefenokee Wilderness Act was passed in 1974, making it the third largest wilderness east of the Mississippi River.

The Okefenokee Swamp is a vast bog inside a huge, saucer-shaped depression that was once part of the ocean floor. The swamp now lies 103 to 128 feet (39 m) above mean sea level. Peat deposits, up to 15 feet (4.6 m) thick, cover much of the swamp floor. These deposits are so unstable in spots that trees and surrounding bushes tremble by stomping the surface. Native Americans named the area "Okefenokee" meaning "Land of the Trembling Earth". Swamp habitats include open wet "prairies", cypress forests, scrub-shrub vegetation, upland islands, and open lakes.

The Okefenokee Swamp is one of the world's largest intact freshwater ecosystems. It has been designated a Wetland of International Importance by the United Nations under the Ramsar Convention of 1971. The swamp is compared through research to wetlands worldwide. It is world-renowned for its amphibian populations that are bio-indicators of global health. Water from the Suwannee River Sill area is used as a standard reference by scientists throughout the world.

The slow-moving waters of the Okefenokee are tea-colored due to the tannic acid released from decaying vegetation. The principal outlet of the swamp, the Suwannee River, originates in the heart of the Okefenokee and drains southwest into the Gulf of Mexico. The swamp's southeastern drainage to the Atlantic Ocean is the St. Mary's River, which forms the boundary between Georgia and Florida.

The swamp contains numerous islands and lakes, along with vast areas of non-forested habitat. Prairies cover about 60,000 acres (240 km^{2}) of the swamp. Once forested, these expanses of marsh were created during periods of severe drought when fires burned out vegetation and the top layers of peat. The prairies harbor a variety of wading birds: herons, egrets, ibises, cranes, and bitterns.

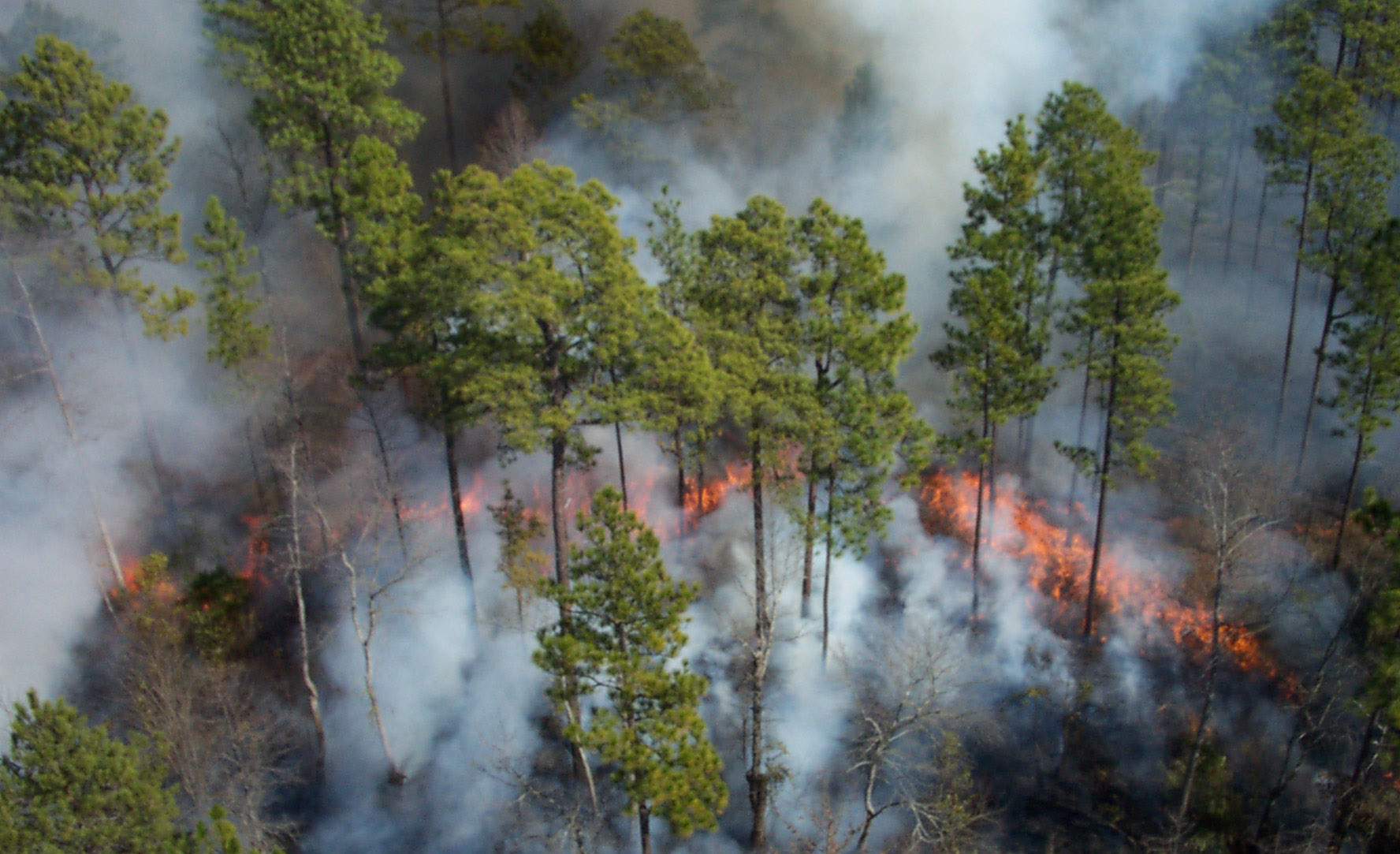
Controlled burn at Okefenokee NWR

Refuge staff manages 33,000 acres (130 km^{2}) of uplands which are being restored to once-abundant longleaf pine and wiregrass habitat.

Refuge staff and volunteers work to preserve the natural qualities of the swamp, provide habitat for a variety of wildlife, and provide recreational opportunities for visitors. They also conduct prescribed burns in upland areas, thin forests, create wildlife openings, plant longleaf pines, and monitor, manage, and improve wildlife populations and habitat.

The Okefenokee is a rainfall-dependent system, and when periods of drought occur, the area becomes susceptible to wildfire. A 20-to-30-year cycle of drought and fire has allowed the Okefenokee to exist as the unique wetland it is. These periods cause changes in the abundance of certain plants (more grasses growing in exposed areas) the nesting success of certain wading birds (failure in extreme drought), and the location of some species of wildlife (fish migrate into deeper lakes and channels and are followed by predators).

== Wildlife and protected species ==
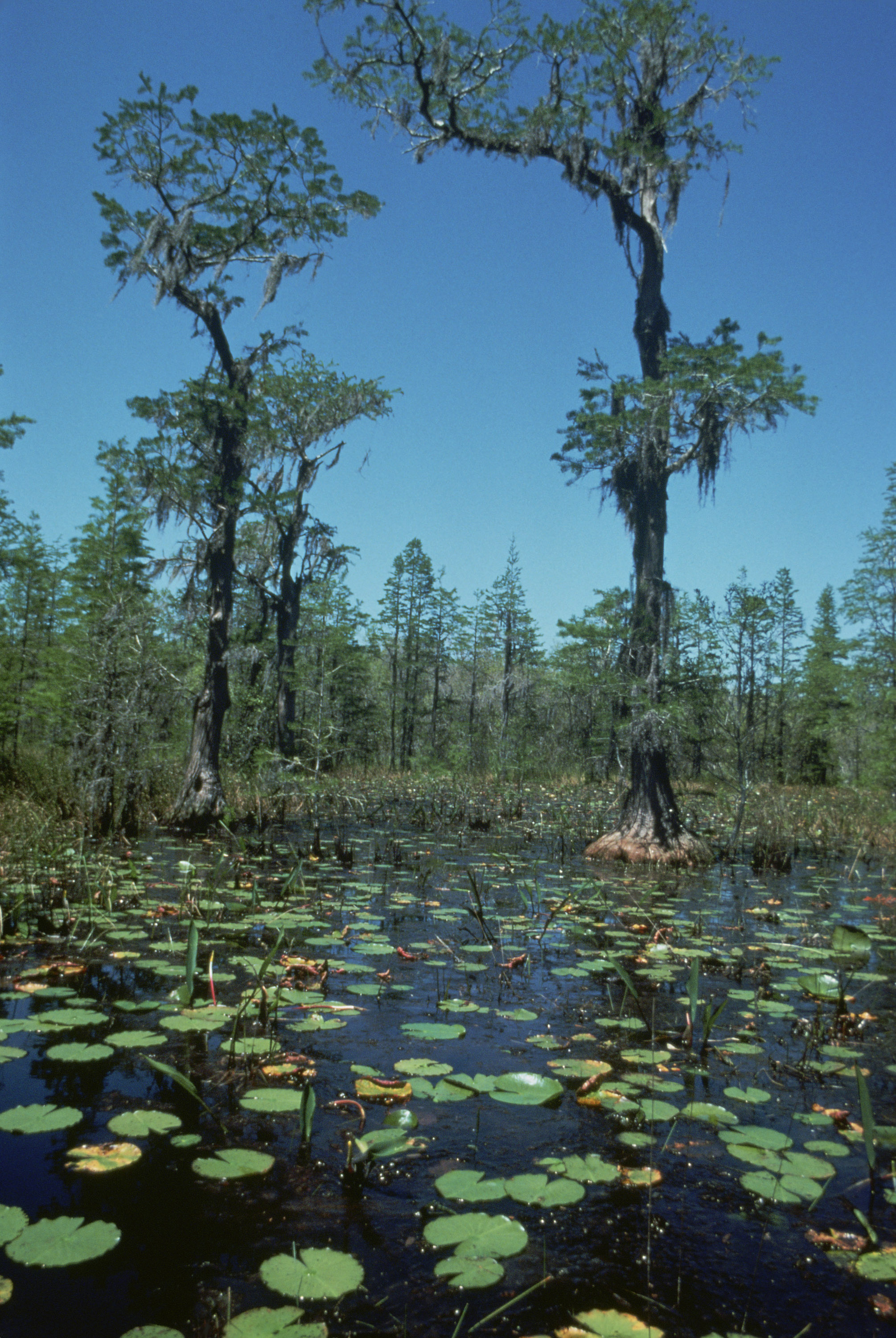
Okefenokee National Wildlife Refuge

With its varied habitats, the Okefenokee has become an area known for its abundance of plants and animals. There are 621 species of plants growing in the swamp, including the Longleaf Pine tree. Animals include 39 fish, 37 amphibian, 64 reptile, 234 bird, and 50 mammal species. The Okefenokee Swamp is world renowned for its amphibian populations that are bioindicators of global health.

Wildlife species include Florida raccoons, wading birds, ducks, American alligators and other reptiles, a variety of amphibians, North American river otters, Florida bobcats, raptors, Eastern American red foxes, wild boars, common minks, Virginia white-tailed deer, gray foxes, Florida skunks, Florida black bears, and songbirds.

The swamp habitat also provides for threatened and endangered species, such as red-cockaded woodpeckers, wood storks, indigo snakes, gopher tortoises and a wide variety of other wildlife species.

== Facilities ==
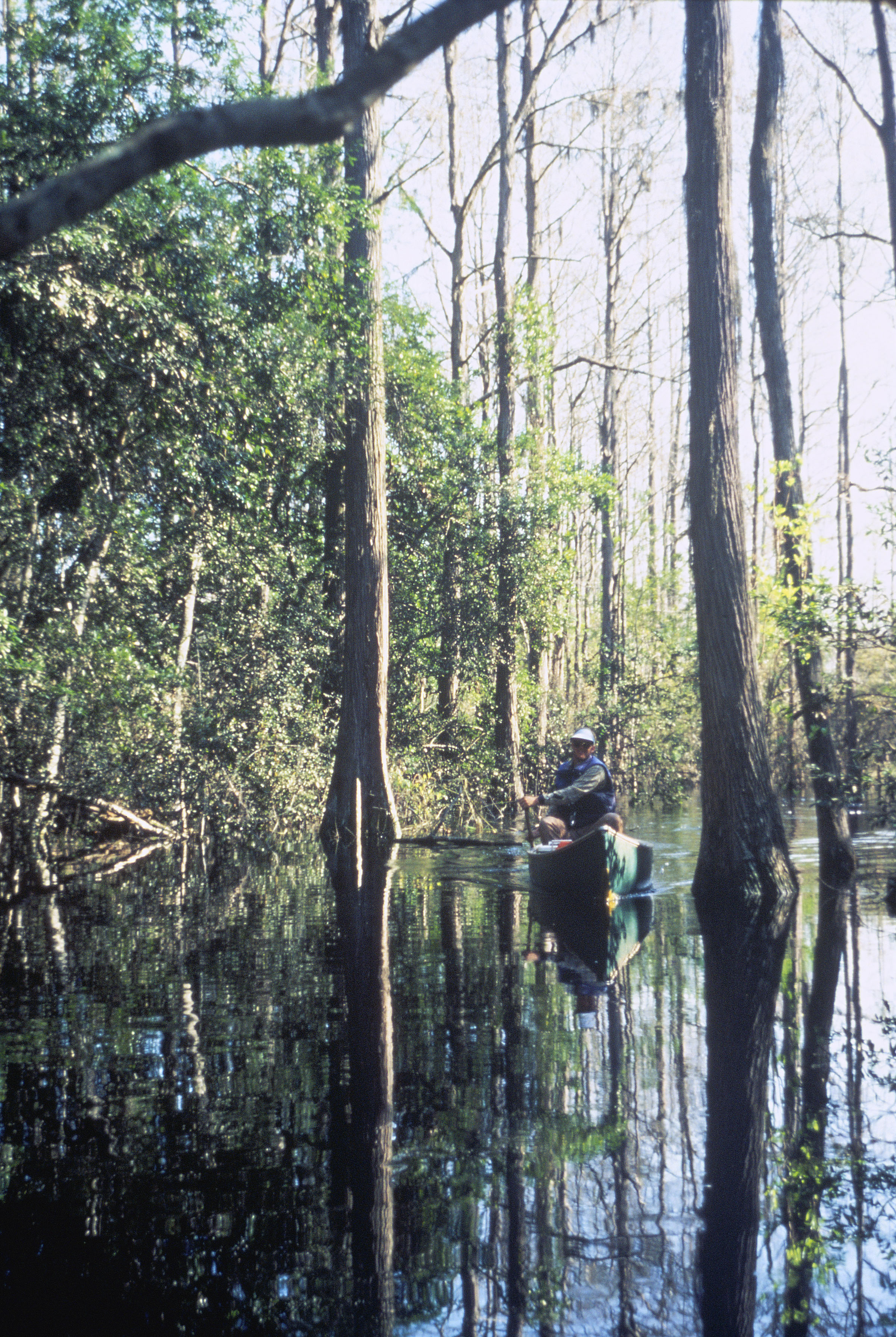
Canoeing in the Okefenokee NWR

There are opportunities for hiking, hunting, fishing, canoeing, boating, photography and wildlife observation.

=== Visitor center ===
The Richard S. Bolt Visitor Center at Okefenokee National Wildlife Refuge was built in 1967, with an auditorium addition in the early 1980s. The 5,000-square-foot (460 m^{2}) building is cedar-sided with open, vaulted ceilings and flagstone floors. It houses exhibits, Okefenokee Wildlife League bookstore sales area, office space for staff and volunteers, storage, and a 100-seat surround-sound auditorium.

=== Chesser Island ===
In the late 19th century, W.T. Chesser and his family settled a small island on the eastern edge of the Okefenokee Swamp. He settled on a 592-acre (2.40 km^{2}) island, now known as Chesser Island. The Chesser homestead still stands on the island. The last of the Chessers left the island in 1958, but many members of the Chesser family remain in the local area.

=== Fishing ===
Lakes and slow-flowing water trails, called "runs", cover much of the Okefenokee. More than 60 lakes dot the refuge, with depths ranging from a few feet to 15 feet (4.6 m). The largest, Billy's Lake, is 3.5 miles (5.6 km) long and 100 to 250 yards (230 m) wide. Fishing is permitted year round in accordance with Georgia State fishing laws. Using live bait fish or trot lines is prohibited.

=== Canoeing and boating ===
There are 121 miles (195 km) of trails in the swamp, of which 70 are open to day-use motorboat 10 horsepower (7.5 kW) and under. Seven overnight shelters are available in the swamp's interior. The refuge has six boating trails (Red, Green, Blue, Purple, Orange, and Brown) giving users a choice of twelve different overnight canoe trips.

=== Trails ===
- Swamp Island Drive – a 9-mile (14 km) driving, biking and walking loop. Scattered throughout the drive are walking trails, wildlife openings and hardwood plots. Additionally, the drive leads to the Chesser Homestead, Boardwalk and Observation tower.
- There are several canoe trails and camping shelters for visitors to enjoy. Some useful coordinates for canoeing and camping:

- Refuge's East Entrance coordinates (Visitor Center): N30.73803° W082.14135°
- Monkey Lake: N30.67493° W82.20594°
- Monkey Lake Shelter: N30.67439° W82.20601°
- Coffee Bay Shelter: N30.76133° W082.22659°
- Restroom on Suwannee Canal: N30.73811° W82.17332°
- Coordinates for junction points (see Okefenokee National Wildlife Refuge Map to locate them):

- Junction of Suwannee Canal and Prairie Lakes Run: N30.73708° W82.17473°
- Junction of Prairie Lakes Run and Tater Rake: N30.72608° W082.18269°
- Those canoeing North on Prairie Lakes Run towards Coffee Bay Shelter can take Tater Rake as a shortcut. Useful coordinates on that shortcut:

- Tater Rake and Suwannee Canal: N30.73704° W082.18188°
- North End of Tater Rake & Cutoff (from Suwannee Canal): N30.73641° W82.17790°

=== Access ===
There are three major entrances to Okefenokee National Wildlife Refuge, each with its own facilities and special character. From the open, wet "prairies" of the east side to the forested cypress swamps on the west, Okefenokee is a mosaic of habitats, plants, and wildlife. Entrance fees are required at each entrance.

- East Entrance – main U.S. Fish and Wildlife Service entrance, located 11 miles (18 km) southwest of Folkston, Georgia
- West Entrance – Stephen C. Foster State Park, located 17 miles (27 km) east of Fargo, Georgia
- North Entrance – Okefenokee Swamp Park, located eight miles (13 km) south of Waycross, Georgia

== See also ==
- Bugaboo scrub fire
- List of National Wildlife Refuges
- Okefenokee Swamp
