= Okefenokee Swamp =

Wetlands in Florida and Georgia, U.S.

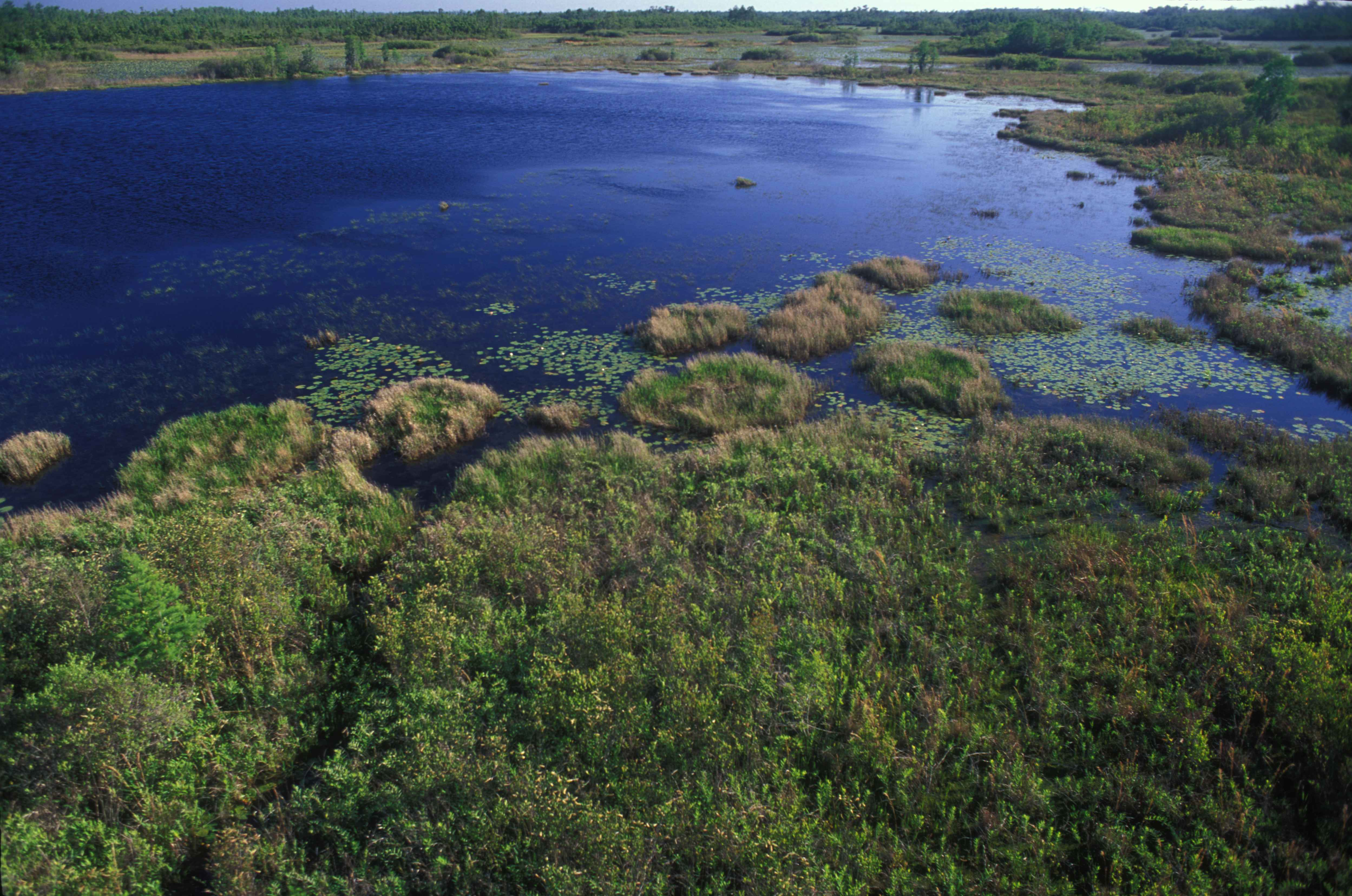
- Aerial view of wetlands in Okefenokee

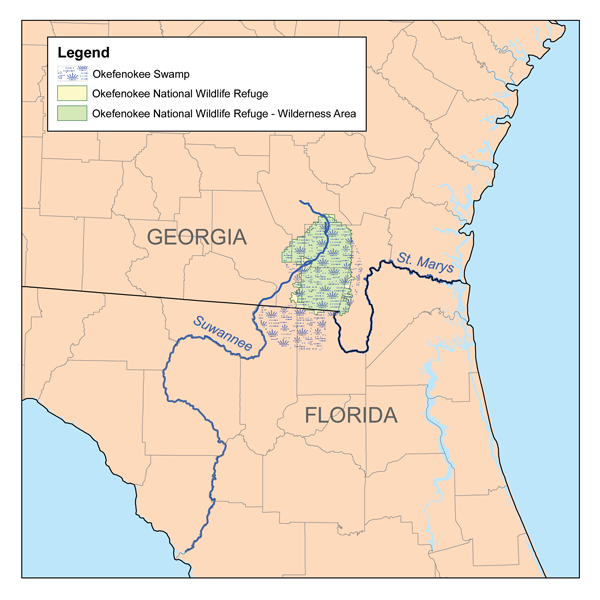
- Location: Southern Georgia; Northern Florida
- Coordinates: 30°37′N 82°19′W
- Area: 438,000 acres (1,770 km^{2})

U.S. National Natural Landmark
- Designated: 1974

The Okefenokee Swamp is a shallow, 438,000-acre (177,000 ha), peat-filled wetland straddling the Georgia–Florida state border in the United States. A majority of the swamp is protected by the Okefenokee National Wildlife Refuge and the Okefenokee Wilderness. It was designated a National Natural Landmark in 1974 and, in 2026, the refuge was inscribed as Georgia's first UNESCO World Heritage Site in recognition of its outstanding universal value as one of the world's largest intact freshwater wetland ecosystems. The wetland is considered one of the Seven Natural Wonders of Georgia and is the largest "blackwater" swamp in North America.

== Etymology ==
The name is attested with more than a dozen variant spellings of the word in historical literature. Though often translated as "land of trembling earth", the name is likely derived from Hitchiti oki fanôːki "bubbling water".

== Origin ==
The Okefenokee was formed over the past 6,500 years by the accumulation of peat in a shallow basin on the edge of an ancient Atlantic coastal terrace, the geological relic of a Pleistocene estuary. The swamp is bordered by the Trail Ridge, a strip of elevated land believed to have formed as coastal dunes or an offshore barrier island. The St. Marys River and the Suwannee River both originate in the swamp. The Suwannee River originates as stream channels in the heart of the swamp and drains at least 90 percent of the swamp's watershed southwest toward the Gulf of Mexico. The St. Marys River, which drains 5 to 10 percent of the swamp in its southeastern corner, flows south along the western side of Trail Ridge through the ridge at St. Marys River Shoals, and north again along the eastern side of Trail Ridge before turning east to the Atlantic.

== History ==
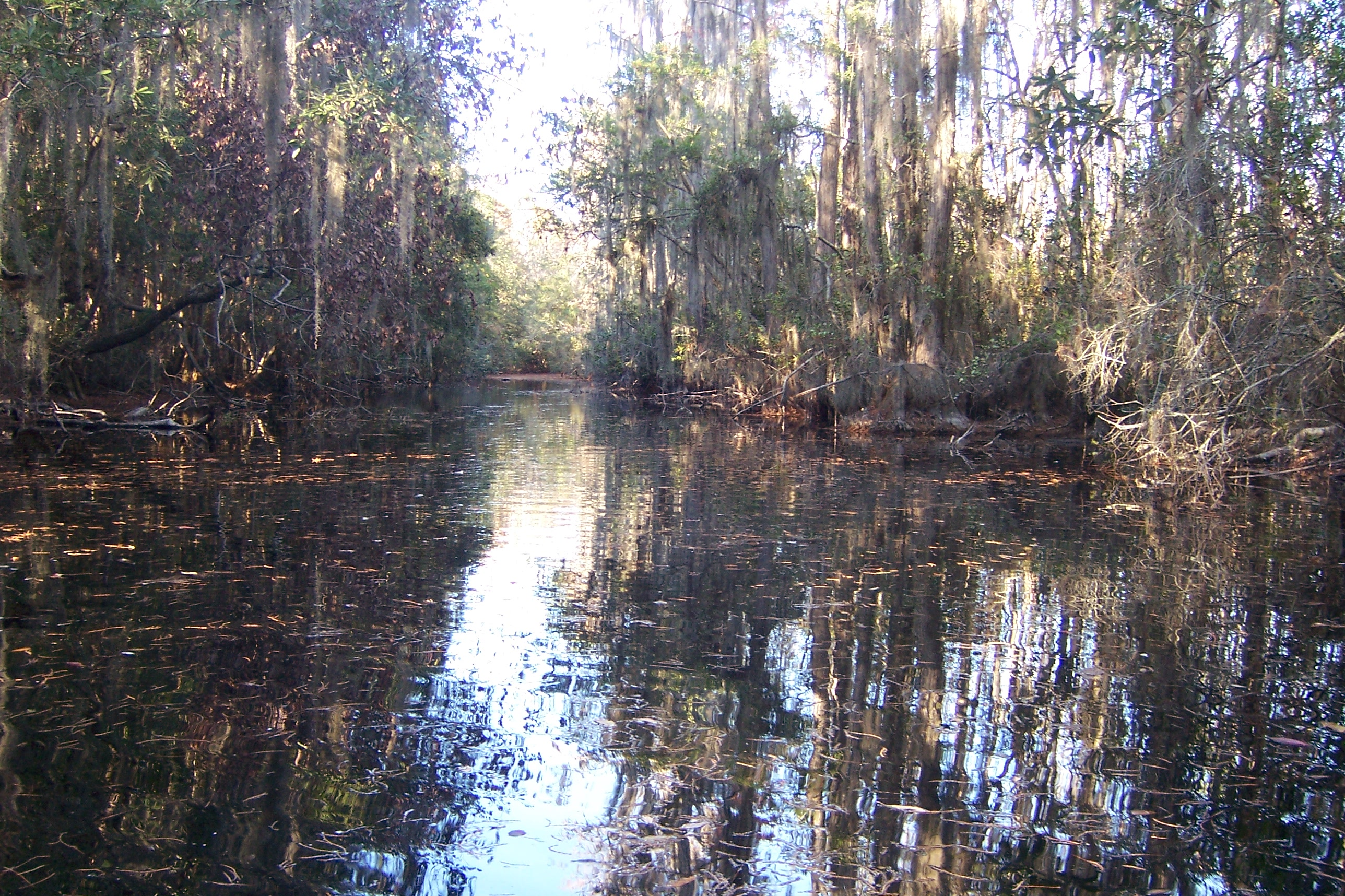
One of the canals in the Okefenokee Swamp

The earliest known inhabitants of the Okefenokee Swamp were the Timucua-speaking Oconi, who dwelt in or on the margin of the swamp. Spanish friars built the mission of Santiago de Oconi in order to convert them to Christianity. The Oconi's boating skills, developed in the hazardous swamps, likely contributed to their later employment by the Spanish as ferrymen across the St. Johns River, near the riverside terminus of northern Florida's camino real.

Modern-day longtime residents of the swamp, referred to as "Swampers", are of overwhelmingly English ancestry. Due to relative isolation, the inhabitants of the Okefenokee used Elizabethan phrases and syntax, preserved since the early colonial period when such speech was common in England, well into the 20th century. The Suwannee Canal was dug across the swamp in the late 19th century in a failed attempt to drain the Okefenokee. After the Suwannee Canal Company's bankruptcy, most of the swamp was purchased by the Hebard family of Philadelphia, who conducted extensive cypress logging operations from 1909 to 1927. Several other logging companies ran railroad lines into the swamp until 1942; some remnants remain visible crossing swamp waterways. On the west side of the swamp, at Billy's Island, logging equipment and other artifacts remain of a 1920s logging town of 600 residents. Most of the Okefenokee Swamp is included in the 403,000-acre (163,000 ha) Okefenokee National Wildlife Refuge.

The largest wildfire in the swamp's history began with a lightning strike near the center of the refuge in May 2007, eventually merging with another wildfire that had begun near Waycross, Georgia, in April when a tree fell on a power line. Named the Bugaboo Fire, the fire burned more than 600,000 acres (240,000 ha), or more than 935 square miles, and remains the largest wildfire in both Georgia and Florida history. In 2011, the Honey Prairie Fire consumed 309,200 acres (125,100 ha) of land in the swamp. In April 2017 a lightning strike started the West Mims Fire, which burned about 152,000 acres (62,000 ha).

=== Mining ===
A 50-year titanium mining operation by DuPont was set to begin in 1997, but protests and public–government opposition over possibly disastrous environmental effects from 1996 to 2000 forced the company to abandon the project in 2000 and retire their mineral rights permanently. In 2003, DuPont donated the 16,000 acres (6,500 ha) it had purchased for mining to The Conservation Fund, and in 2005, nearly 7,000 acres (2,800 ha) of the donated land was transferred to Okefenokee National Wildlife Refuge.

In 2018, Twin Pines Minerals LLC, a mining company based in Birmingham, Alabama, proposed a titanium mining operation near the swamp. Over 60,000 people sent comments opposing the operation. In 2020 a rule by the first Trump administration reduced what was protected under the Clean Water Act, removing about 400 acres (160 ha) in the proposed mining site from federal protections. The updated plan would include mining 577.4 acres (233.7 ha) for titanium and zirconium, 2.9 miles (4.7 km) southeast of the refuge. In 2022, U.S. Senator Jon Ossoff temporarily blocked the proposed titanium mine after the U.S. Fish and Wildlife Service warned of severe potential damage to the wildlife refuge. On June 20, 2025, The Conservation Fund purchased all 7,700 acres (3,100 ha) of land owned by Twin Pines Minerals LLC near Okefenokee. The deal, worth a reported US$60 million, formally ended plans by the company to mine titanium oxide and other minerals near the swamp.

=== World Heritage Site ===
In July 2026, the UNESCO World Heritage Committee inscribed the Okefenokee National Wildlife Refuge on the World Heritage List under natural criteria (ix) and (x), recognizing its outstanding universal value for its ongoing ecological processes and biodiversity. The inscription made the Okefenokee Georgia's first UNESCO World Heritage Site and the 27th World Heritage Site in the United States. The committee approved the nomination during its 47th session in Busan, South Korea. The refuge had first been identified as a potential World Heritage candidate in 1982, and its nomination followed more than four decades of efforts by federal, state, nonprofit, Tribal and local partners. The inscription came during a period of heightened public attention over proposed titanium mining near the refuge. The refuge continues to be owned and managed by the United States Fish and Wildlife Service.

== Tourism and access ==
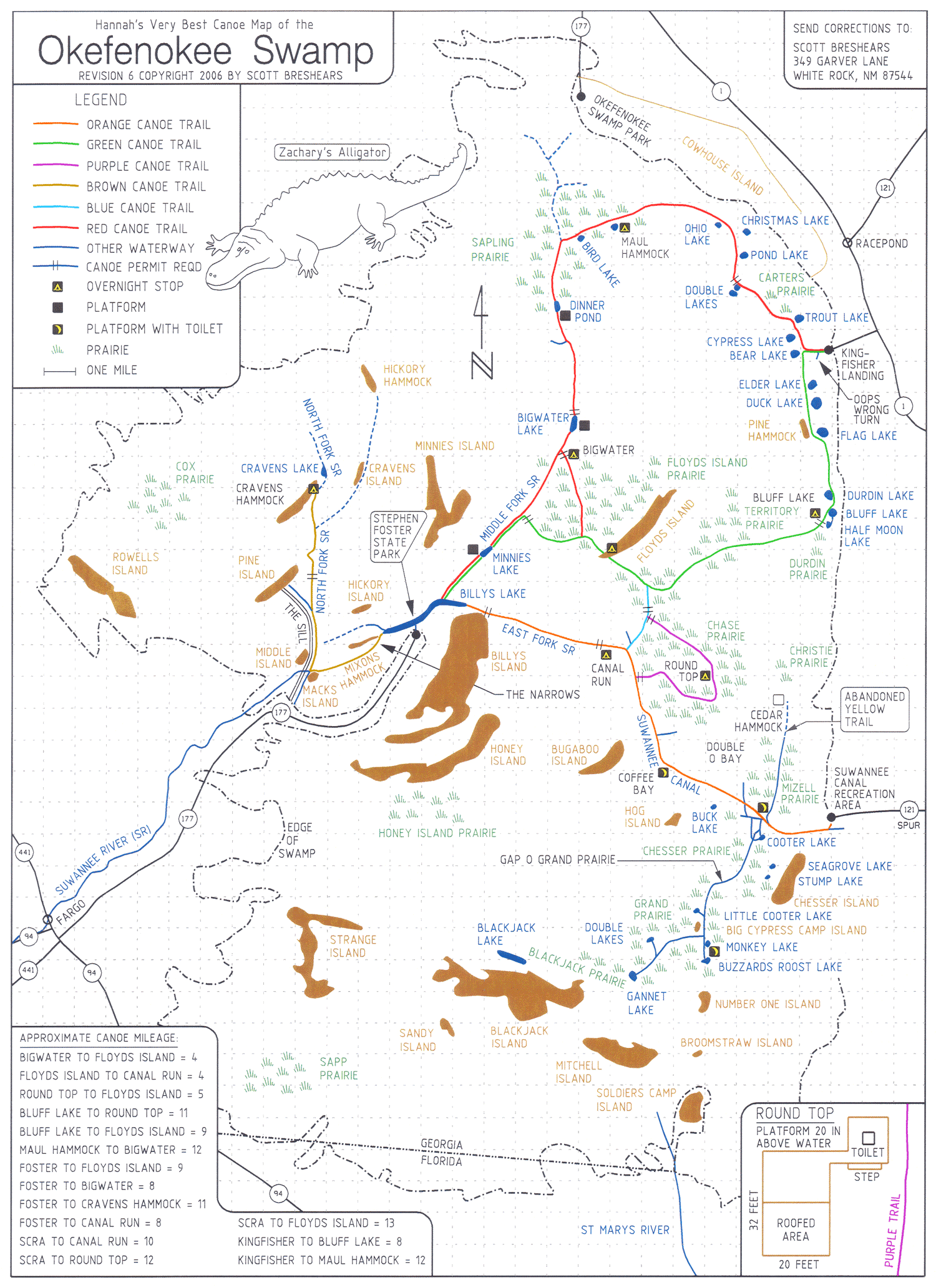
Map of Okefenokee Swamp

Many visitors enter the Okefenokee National Wildlife Refuge each year. The swamp provides an important economic resource to southeast Georgia and northeast Florida. The refuge receives more than 600,000 visitors annually. Public access to the swamp includes:

- Suwannee Canal Recreation Area at Folkston, Georgia
- Kingfisher Landing at Race Pond, Georgia
- Stephen C. Foster State Park at Fargo, Georgia
- Suwannee Sill Recreation Area at Fargo, Georgia
- Okefenokee Swamp Park provides the northernmost access near Waycross, Georgia.

State Road 2 passes through the Florida portion between the Georgia cities of Council and Moniac. The graded Swamp Perimeter Road encircles Okefenokee National Wildlife Refuge. Gated and closed to public use, it provides access for fire management of the interface between the federal refuge and the surrounding industrial tree farms.

== Environment ==
The Okefenokee Swamp had been listed as one of America's Most Endangered Rivers in 2020 and again in 2023 on account of the mining threats.

The Okefenokee Swamp is part of the Southeastern conifer forests ecoregion. Much of the Okefenokee is a southern coastal plain nonriverine basin swamp, forested by bald cypress (Taxodium distichum) and swamp tupelo (Nyssa biflora) trees. Upland areas support southern coastal plain oak domes and hammocks, with thick stands of sand live oaks. Drier and more frequently burned areas support Atlantic coastal plain upland longleaf pine woodlands of longleaf pine (Pinus palustris).

The swamp has many species of carnivorous plants, including Utricularia, Sarracenia psittacina, and the giant Sarracenia minor var. okefenokeensis. A species of mushroom-like fungus Rogersiomyces okefenokeensis J.L. Crane & Schokn. 1978 is found in the swamp. The swamp is home to many wading birds, including herons, egrets, ibises, cranes, and bitterns, though populations fluctuate with seasons and water levels. The swamp also hosts numerous woodpecker and songbird species. Okefenokee is famous for its amphibians and reptiles such as toads, frogs, turtles, lizards, snakes, and an abundance of American alligators. The oldest known alligator, named "Okefenokee Joe" after environmentalist Okefenokee Joe, died in September 2021, at almost 80 years of age. The Okefenokee Swamp is also a critical habitat for the Florida black bear.

Wildlife of Okefenokee Swamp

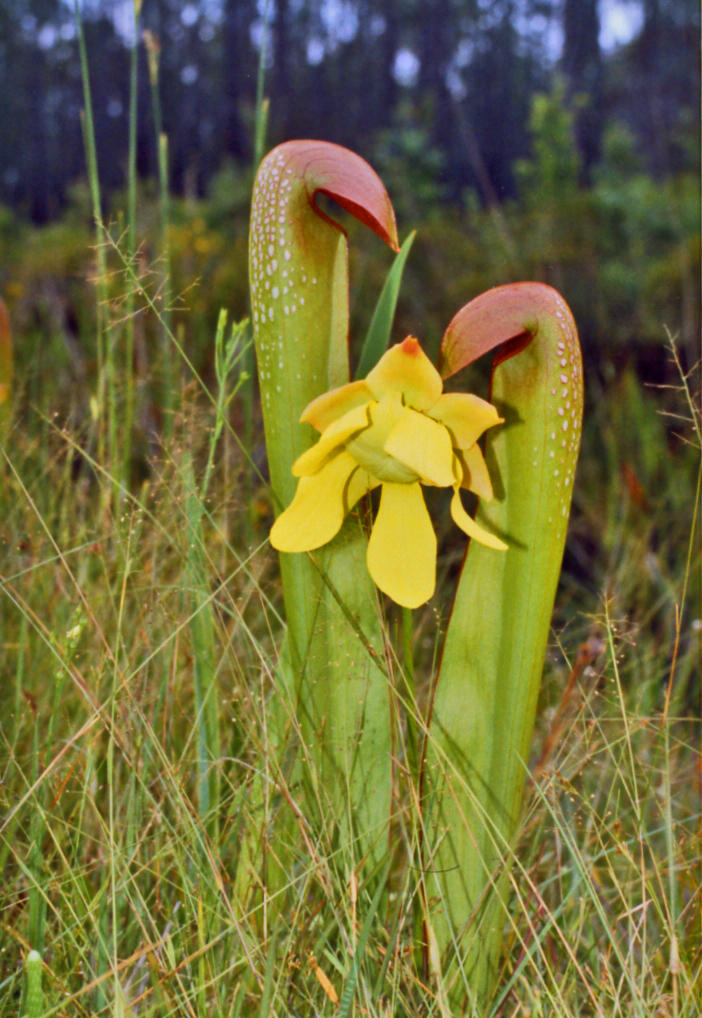
Okefenokee giant hooded pitcher plant

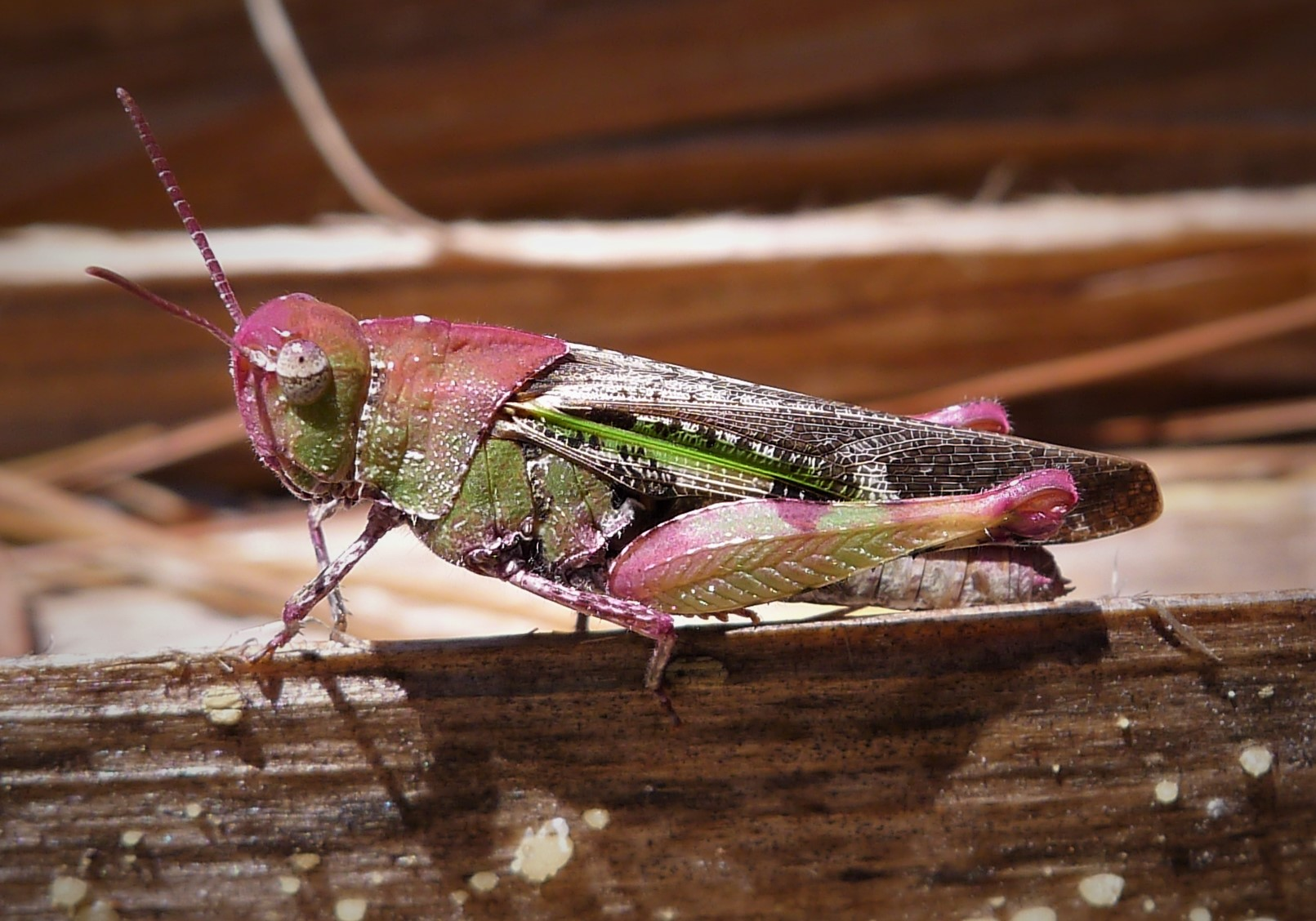
Green-striped grasshopper

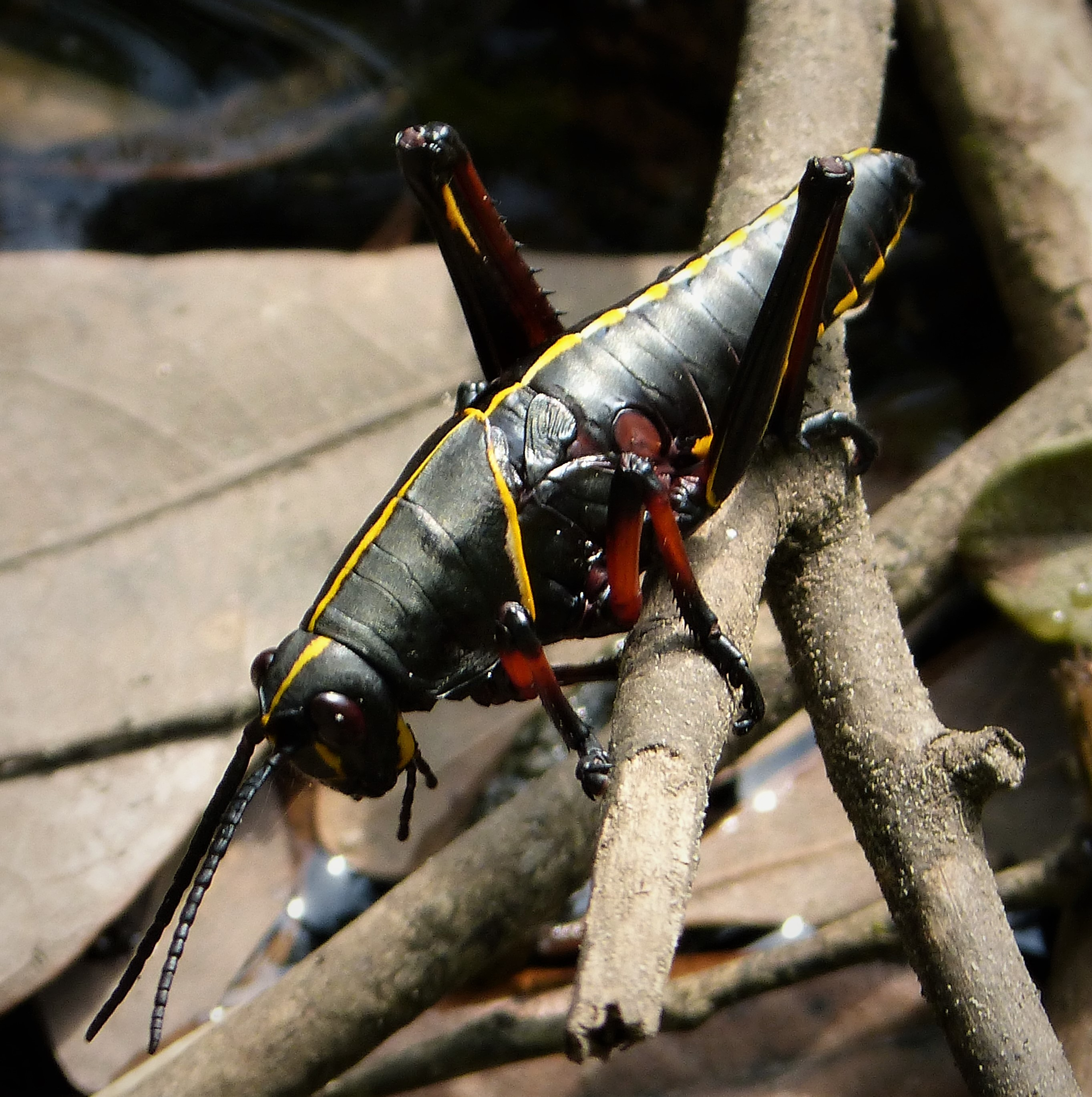
Eastern lubber grasshopper nymph

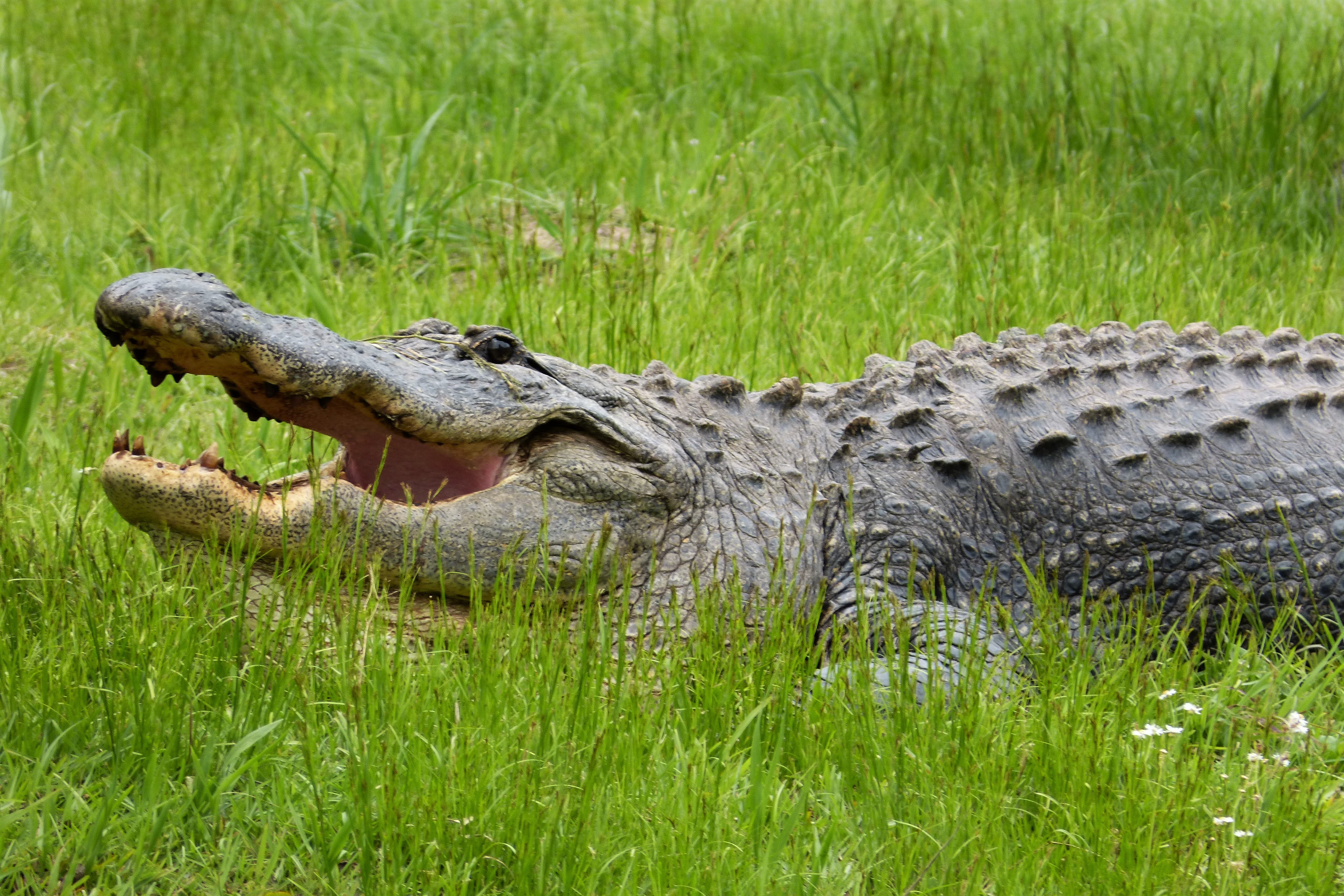
A large American alligator

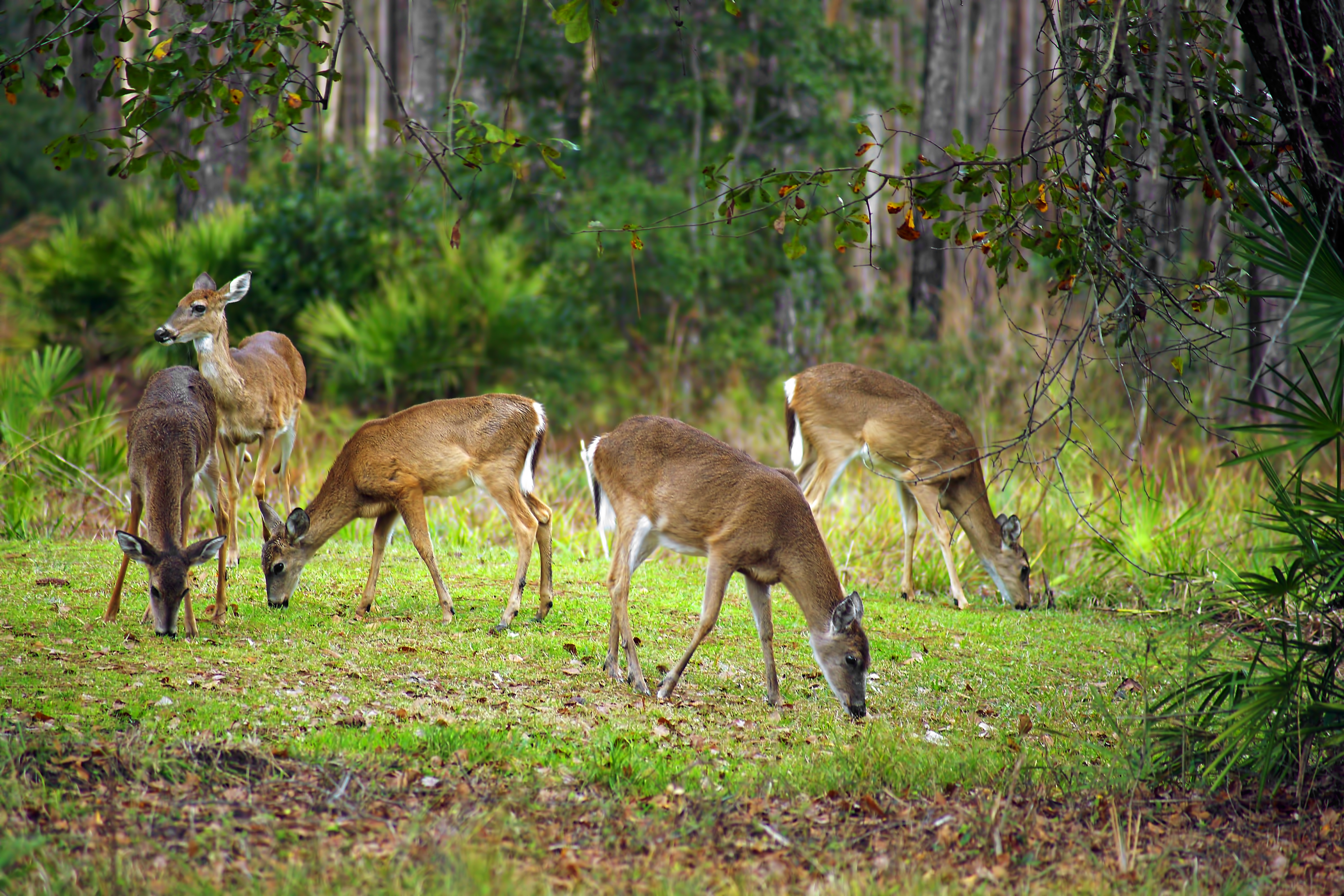
White-tailed deer

== See also ==
- Swamp Water – 1941 film by Jean Renoir
- Lure of the Wilderness – 1952 film by Jean Negulesco
- Gator – 1976 film by Burt Reynolds
- The Wahoo Bobcat – American children's book

== Bibliography ==
- Afable, Patricia O. & Beeler, Madison S. (1996). "Place Names". In Goddard, Ives & Sturtevant, William C. (eds.). Handbook of North American Indians. Vol. 17: Languages. Washington, D.C.: Smithsonian Institution.
- Worth, John E. (1998). Timucua Chiefdoms of Spanish Florida. Volume 2: Resistance and Destruction. University Press of Florida. ISBN 0-8130-1574-X.
- Nelson, Megan Kate (2005). Trembling Earth: A Cultural History of the Okefenokee Swamp. Athens: University of Georgia Press. This is a readable book from a professional historian that covers the history of the human interaction with the swamp from about 1700 to the 1940s, very good background for those planning a visit.
