= Mrakia frigida =

Scientific classification
- Kingdom: Fungi
- Division: Basidiomycota
- Class: Tremellomycetes
- Order: Cystofilobasidiales
- Family: Mrakiaceae
- Genus: Mrakia
- Species: M. frigida

Binomial name
- Mrakia frigida (Fell, Statzell, I.L. Hunter & Phaff) Y. Yamada & Komag. (1987)

Synonyms
- Candida frigida Leucosporidium frigidum Candida gelida Leucosporidium gelidum Mrakia gelida Candida nivalis Leucosporidium nivale Mrakia nivalis Leucosporidium stokesii Mrakia stokesii

Species of fungus

Mrakia frigida is a species of fungus in the order Cystofilobasidiales. The species occurs in both a yeast and hyphal state, the latter producing teliospores from which basidia emerge. It was originally isolated in its yeast state from Antarctic snow.

== Growth temperature ==
Mrakia frigida has been classified as an obligate psychrophile since it grows well at subzero temperatures and is unable to grow at temperatures above 18–20 °C (64–68 °F). Mrakia frigida grows at −2–20 °C (28–68 °F). Rapid growth of Mrakia frigida occurs at 17 °C (63 °F), and slight increase in temperature results in growth decrease. Its maximum growth temperature is 19–20 °C (66–68 °F) when glucose is used as carbon source and 17–18 °C (63–64 °F) when ethanol is used. The growth rate of Mrakia frigida on glucose as substrate for a given temperature is higher than that on ethanol. The cell yield of Mrakia frigida is maximum at subzero temperatures.

== Membrane lipid composition ==
There is a positive correlation between the growth temperature and the degree of fatty-acid unsaturation of the cell lipids of Mrakia frigida. The variation in the degree of fatty acid unsaturation of the yeast indicates its ability to alter the cellular component is fundamental to adaptation to environmental changes. The extent to such ability determines the growth temperature limits of Mrakia frigida. The lower limit is the point at which its membrane lipids solidify and the upper limit is the point at which its membrane lipids melt.

== Cytochrome concentration ==
Mrakia frigida shows absorption bands at room temperature characteristic of cytochromes aa3, b and c. The concentration to the cytochromes in Mrakia frigida is negatively related to its membrane-lipid unsaturation rate. At the maximum growth temperatures when the degree of lipid unsaturation of the cell membrane is high, the final cell yield is less than at lower temperatures when membrane-lipid unsaturation rate is low. This indicates glucose repression of cytochrome synthesis occurs at high degree of lipid unsaturation. However, a high concentration of cytochrome c is observed at the maximum growth temperatures of Mrakia frigida. This phenomenon may be an attempt by the cells to compensate for the decrease in cytochrome a+a3 by involving alternative pathways of electron transport.

== Functions of cellular membranes ==
The positive correlation relationship between the growth temperature of Mrakia frigida and the membrane-lipid unsaturation rate, and the negative relationship between the membrane-lipid unsaturation rate and cytochrome concentration in cells indicate the membrane structure and composition are significant to temperature adaptation in Mrakia frigida. Manipulation of the fatty-acid unsaturation index allows Mrakia frigida to alter its membrane fluidity, and function with changing temperatures.
