= Cystofilobasidium =

Scientific classification
- Kingdom: Fungi
- Division: Basidiomycota
- Class: Tremellomycetes
- Order: Cystofilobasidiales
- Family: Cystofilobasidiaceae
- Genus: Cystofilobasidium; Oberw. & Bandoni (1983)

Type species
- Cystofilobasidium bisporidii (Fell, I.L. Hunter & Tallman) Oberw. & Bandoni

Species
- Cystofilobasidium alribaticum (nom. inval.); Cystofilobasidium bisporidii Cystofilobasidium capitatum Cystofilobasidium ferigula Cystofilobasidium infirmominiatum Cystofilobasidium intermedium (nom. inval.); Cystofilobasidium josepaulonis Cystofilobasidium lacus-mascardii Cystofilobasidium lari-marini Cystofilobasidium macerans

Genus of fungi

Cystofilobasidium is a genus of fungi in the family Cystofilobasidiaceae. Species occur as yeasts, but produce filamentous sexual states that form dikaryote teliospores, from which the unicellular basidia (if present) are formed. The hyphae usually have dolipore septa without a parenthesome, and their cell walls contain xylose. The genus currently contains nine species worldwide.
