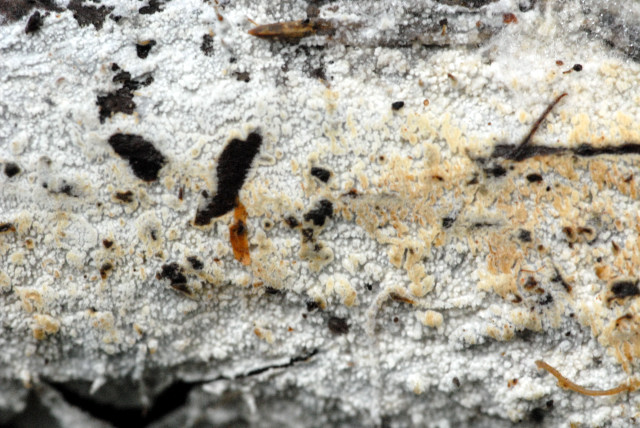

Scientific classification
- Kingdom: Fungi
- Division: Basidiomycota
- Class: Agaricomycetes
- Order: Cantharellales
- Family: Hydnaceae
- Genus: Sistotrema
- Species: S. brinkmannii

Binomial name
- Sistotrema brinkmannii (Bres.) J. Erikss. (1948)

Synonyms
- Odontia brinkmannii G. Bresadola (1903); Grandinia brinkmannii Bourdot & Galzin (1914); Trechispora brinkmannii D.P. Rogers & H.S. Jacks. (1943)

= Sistotrema brinkmannii =

Species of fungus

Sistotrema brinkmannii, a resupinate wood-rotting basidiomycete, is a fungus found in soil, moss, debris, rotten woods as well as woods including seedling roots of Pinus banksiana Lamb. and ectomycorrhizae. No health issues caused by this fungus in human and animals have been reported although it is causative of brown rot. This fungus grows rapidly on malt extract agar (MEA), forming white mats with a faint sweet odour. It is commonly called "chain chlamydospore fungus" because bulbils are formed by chains of its cells that resemble chlamydospores. The basidia of this fungus are urniform and usually possess 6-8 sterigmata, and the spores are smooth and slightly curved.

== History and taxonomy ==
Sistotrema brinkmannii possessed several synonyms in the early twentieth century including Corticium coronilla and Corticium octosporum, named by v. Höhnel & Litschauer and Schroeter ex v. Hohnel & Litschauer in 1906 respectively, and (Bres.) J. Erikss. named it Sistotrema brinkmannii in 1948. This fungus has been known as a cotton root rot pathogen, and it was thought to be an outdoor airborne fungus as there had been no reports suggesting its presence in indoor air. However, studies in Scotland found that 56% of indoor air samples from 51% of homes contained Sistotrema brinkmannii, indicating that wood rot observed in houses can be caused by this fungus.

The basidia of Sistotrema brinkmannii usually range 10-20 × 5-8 μm and spores are 4-5 × 2-2.5 μm in size. This fungus was believed to be one of the different life stages of Phymatotrichum omnivorum. However, they are distinguished from each other based on the feature of their hyphae; hyphae of Sistotrema brinkmannii have dolipore septum while Phymatotrichum omnivorum possesses the simple type. Phylogenetic analyses sequencing genes such as mtSSU and RPB2 can strongly support the monophyly of this fungus, sorting it into the same monophyletic group as Clavulina-Membranomyces.

== Growth and morphology ==
In 1994, Adan found that about 30% of the fungi floating in the air is Sistotrema brinkmannii in England, and the proportion increases to near 60% in winter. On the other hand, the presence of this fungus in the air significantly decreases in summer and autumn. His study indicates that Sistotrema brinkmannii is not a dominant fungus in the air throughout the year, compared to other airborne fungi such as Penicillium, Cladosporium, and mycelia sterilia.

The membrane of this fungus is white and has waxy and soft texture when it is fresh. When it gets dry, it becomes pale cream and its texture gets ashy and brittle. It is oxidase negative and the hyphae containing numerous clamps are oil-rich, contributing to its coarse granular appearance. The mycelium of this fungus can cultivate on trama of Trametes hirsuta fruit bodies, as well as on wood-inhabiting basidiomycetes, with the help of a technique called "moisture gradient technique".

== Physiology ==
Sistotrema brinkmannii produces β-1,3/1,4-glucanase which has a great catalytic efficiency towards a variety of specific substrates. For instance, it converts Avicel containing microcrystalline cellulose to glucose at pH 4.0 and 65 °C. It also forms white thin mycelial mats by microfiltration to protect itself from chemicals and microorganisms in soil and water. It decays window joinery in the house although it does not produce many spores, indicating that it is more widespread in indoor air compared to other fungi, such as Serpula lacrymans, which are associated with indoor wood decay.

== Habitat and reproduction ==
Both outdoor and indoor airs may contain Sistotrema brinkmannii. It was found that this fungus can contaminate washing machines in houses, but it is not a causative agent of human diseases or formation of malodour. The number of spores in dwellings increases as a result of surface disturbance such as vacuum cleaning of floors. This fungus may contaminate biofilms called endobronchial stents as well, which are used as an antibiotic treatment for airway complications such as lung transplantation. However, this contamination does not cause any serious issues in human health while some other fungi, including Scedosporium, which possibly contaminate the biofilms are known to be opportunistic pathogens in human.

This fungus can reproduce sexually by both breeding and self-breeding which systems are called heterothallism and homothallism, respectively. There are three different incompatibility groups identified based on the reproductive mechanisms: bipolar heterothallic forms, tetrapolar heterothallic forms, and homothallic forms. These reproductive forms are dependent on its genetics. It was believed that homothallic forms are intersterile while both bipolar and tetrapolar heterothallic forms are capable of mating. In 1969, Lemke recognized that bipolar heterothallic forms and tetrapolar heterothallic forms also have intersterility as well as homothallic forms. In the study, he defines intersterility as the inability to form a prototrophic heterokaryon through nutritional forcing. The study indicates that all groups are in fact intersterile with each other, meaning that the mating must be carried out within the same group for successful sexual reproduction. Among the three groups, homothallic and bipolar forms groups may occasionally be hybridized due to nutritional forces.
