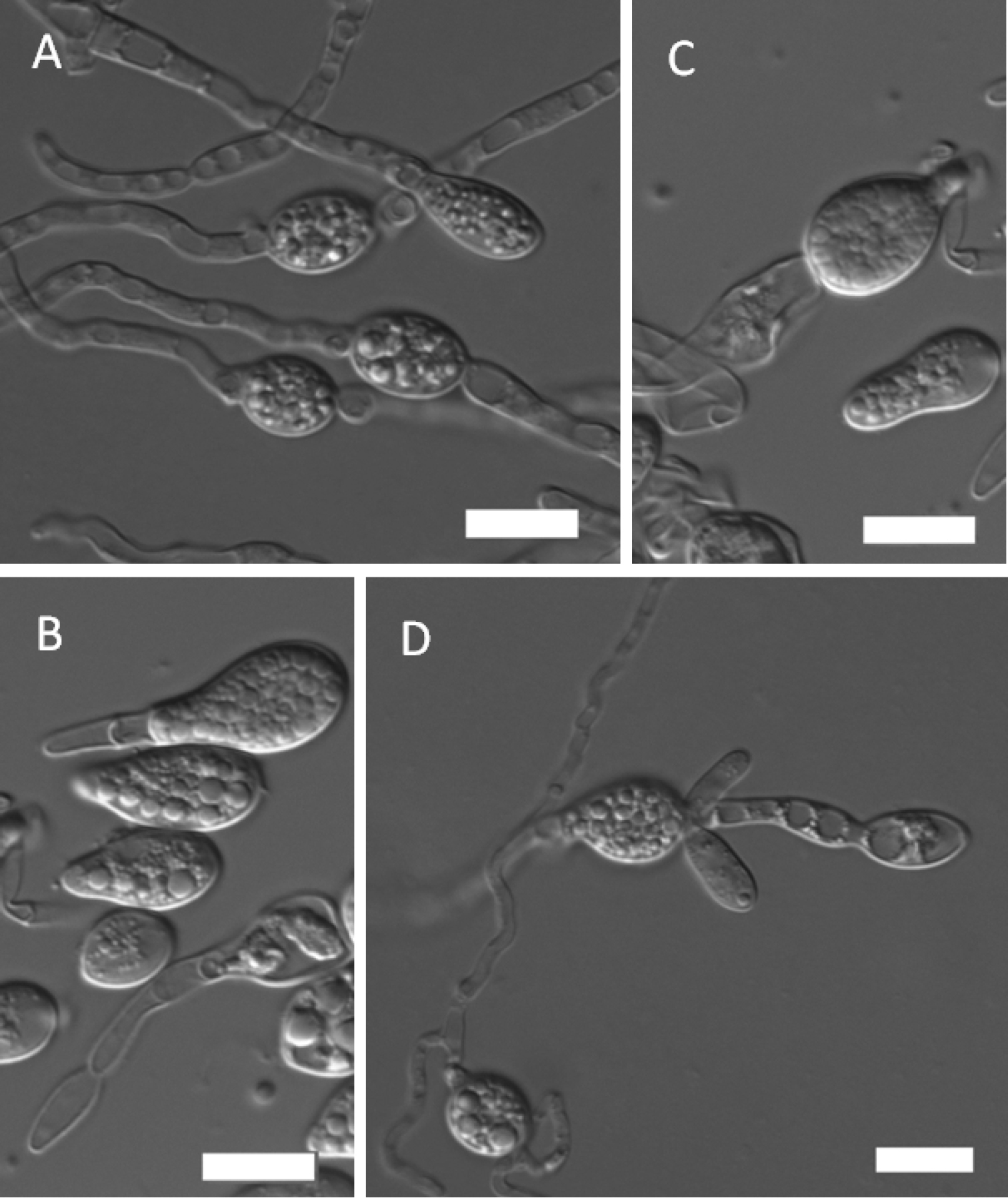
- Teliospores of Mrakia arctica under microscope

Scientific classification
- Kingdom: Fungi
- Division: Basidiomycota
- Class: Tremellomycetes
- Order: Cystofilobasidiales
- Family: Mrakiaceae
- Genus: Mrakia; Y. Yamada & Komag. (1987)

Type species
- Mrakia frigida (Fell, Statzell, I.L. Hunter & Phaff) Y. Yamada & Komag. (1987)

Species
- Mrakia aquatica Mrakia arctica Mrakia blollopis Mrakia cryoconiti Mrakia fibulata Mrakia frigida Mrakia hoshinonis Mrakia montana Mrakia niccombsii Mrakia panshiensis Mrakia psychrophila Mrakia robertii Mrakia soli Mrakia stelviica Mrakia terrae

Synonyms
- Mrakiella Margesin & Fell (2008)

= Mrakia =

Genus of fungi

Mrakia is a genus of fungi in the order Cystofilobasidiales. The genus comprises yeasts, some of which have a hyphal state forming teliospores from which basidia arise. Mrakia species are typically psychrophilic, many originally isolated from glaciers and frigid environments, and are capable of low-temperature fermentation, making them of potential interest in brewing and bioremediation.

The genus was named after the American microbiologist Emil M. Mrak.

The genus Mrakiella was proposed for the anamorphic (yeast) state of Mrakia. Following changes to the International Code of Nomenclature for algae, fungi, and plants, however, the practice of giving different names to teleomorph and anamorph forms of the same fungus was discontinued, meaning that Mrakiella became a synonym of the earlier name Mrakia.
