= Bryoclavula =

Scientific classification
- Kingdom: Fungi
- Division: Basidiomycota
- Class: Agaricomycetes
- Order: Cantharellales
- Genus: Bryoclavula; H.Masumoto & Y.Degawa (2020)

Type species
- Bryoclavula phycophila H.Masumoto & Y.Degawa (2020)

Species
- B. dryalisepiplutea B. phycophila

Genus of lichens

Bryoclavula is a small genus of basidiolichens of uncertain familial placement in the order Cantharellales. It comprises two species of bryophilous lichens (lichens that grows on bryophytes). The genus was circumscribed by Hiroshi Masumoto and Yousuke Degawa in 2020, with B. phycophila assigned as the type, and at the time, only species. An additional species, discovered in east Texas, USA, was added to the genus in 2024.

== Taxonomy ==
Bryoclavula was established in 2020 by Hiroshi Masumoto and Yousuke Degawa, with B. phycophila designated as the type, and at the time, only species. The generic name combines "bryo" (Greek, referring to bryophytes, the substrate on which it grows) and "clavula" (Latin, referring to the small clavarioid or club-shaped fruiting bodies).

Phylogenetic analyses of nuclear ribosomal RNA gene (nrLSU) sequences place Bryoclavula in a distinct lineage within the Cantharellales, in what has been referred to as the "CHS assemblage" (comprising members of Clavulinaceae, Hydnaceae, and Sistotremataceae). The genus forms a moderately supported monophyletic group with Minimedusa and certain Sistotrema species, though exact relationships among these lineages remain unresolved.

Bryoclavula is distinguished from the morphologically similar genus Multiclavula (also in Cantharellales) by both molecular phylogeny and the structure of its lichenized thallus, which in Bryoclavula is undifferentiated and does not form the globular or bulbil-like structures characteristic of Multiclavula.

== Description ==
Bryoclavula comprises small lichenized fungi that form delicate, club-shaped fruiting bodies. These basidiomata are typically white to pale cream in colour, measuring 1.6–3.8 mm in height and 0.2–0.6 mm in width. They usually have a simple, unbranched form, though rare branched specimens may occur. The apex of each fruiting body is broadly to narrowly rounded, with a basal stipe that is somewhat translucent and generally less than half the total length of the structure.

The fungus forms an undifferentiated thallus on aging bryophytes growing on moist rock surfaces. This thallus appears as a bright green, gelatinous, amorphous layer, where fungal hyphae loosely surround spherical photobiont (algal) cells. Unlike the related genus Multiclavula, Bryoclavula does not develop globular or bulbil-like thallus structures.

Microscopically, Bryoclavula is characterized by:

- Trama hyphae that are parallel-aligned, hyaline, clamped, and thin to slightly thick-walled (up to 0.6 μm), measuring 2–6 μm in diameter
- A hymenium layer 55–90 μm thick
- Clavate (club-shaped) to somewhat urniform (urn-shaped) basidia measuring 25–50 by 5–8 μm, bearing (2)4–6(7) sterigmata
- Narrowly ellipsoid to elongated basidiospores measuring about 5.6–6.6 by 2.7–3.2 μm

The photobiont (photosynthetic partner) consists of green algal cells that are more or less spherical (8.2–13.8 μm in diameter) containing a pyrenoid and several oil droplets. Transmission electron microscopy confirms the presence of the pyrenoid structure within the algal cells, which is an important diagnostic feature of the genus.

When cultured on potato dextrose agar, Bryoclavula grows slowly, forming velvety colonies that are cream to pale brown in the centre and whitish in the outer parts, with an undulate (wavy) margin.

== Species ==
- Bryoclavula dryalisepiplutea Quedensley & Widhelm (2024) – Texas
- Bryoclavula phycophila H.Masumoto & Y.Degawa (2020) – Japan
