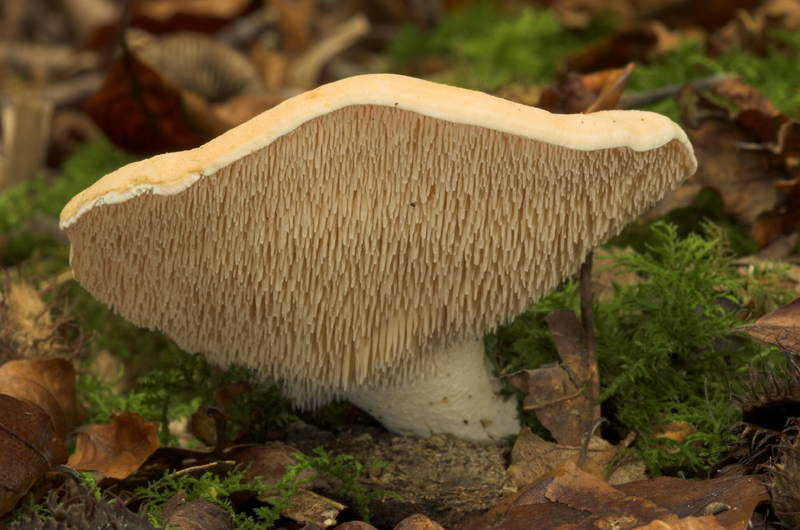
- Hydnum repandum

Scientific classification
- Kingdom: Fungi
- Division: Basidiomycota
- Class: Agaricomycetes
- Order: Cantharellales
- Family: Hydnaceae; Chevall., 1826

Type genus
- Hydnum L.

Genera
- Burgoa (anamorph); Corallofungus; Gloeomucro; Hydnum; Ingoldiella (anamorph); Osteomorpha (anamorph); Paullicorticium; Repetobasidiellum; Sistotrema

Synonyms
- Repetobasidiaceae Jülich; Sistotremataceae Jülich

= Hydnaceae =

Family of fungi

The Hydnaceae are a family of fungi in the order Cantharellales. Originally the family encompassed all species of fungi that produced basidiocarps (fruit bodies) having a hymenium (spore-bearing surface) consisting of slender, downward-hanging tapering extensions referred to as "spines" or "teeth", whether they were related or not. This artificial but often useful grouping is now more generally called the hydnoid or tooth fungi. In the strict, modern sense, the Hydnaceae are limited to the genus Hydnum and related genera, with basidiocarps having a toothed or poroid hymenium. Species in the family are ectomycorrhizal, forming a mutually beneficial relationship with the roots of trees and other plants. Hydnum repandum (the hedgehog fungus) is an edible species, commercially collected in some countries and often marketed under the French name pied de mouton.

== Taxonomy ==
=== History ===
The family was originally described in 1826 by French botanist François Fulgis Chevallier to accommodate all the larger fungi with a toothed or spiny hymenium. As such, the family was entirely artificial, bringing together a diverse assemblage of species that have subsequently been reassigned to various families. In 1933, Dutch mycologist Marinus Anton Donk radically limited the Hydnaceae (which he referred to the tribe Hydneae) to Hydnum repandum and related species that produced "stichic" basidia (basidia with nuclear spindles arranged longitudinally). He considered this feature placed these species closer to the chanterelles (Cantharellaceae) than to other hydnoid fungi. Donk's disposition of the family was widely accepted and a standard 1995 text placed Hydnum and the Hydnaceae within the Cantharellales, though still retaining some additional genera (Amylodontia, Climacodon, Corallofungus, Dentinum, Gloeomucro, Nigrohydnum, Phaeoradulum, and Stegiacantha) within the family. Most of these have now been placed elsewhere.

=== Current status ===
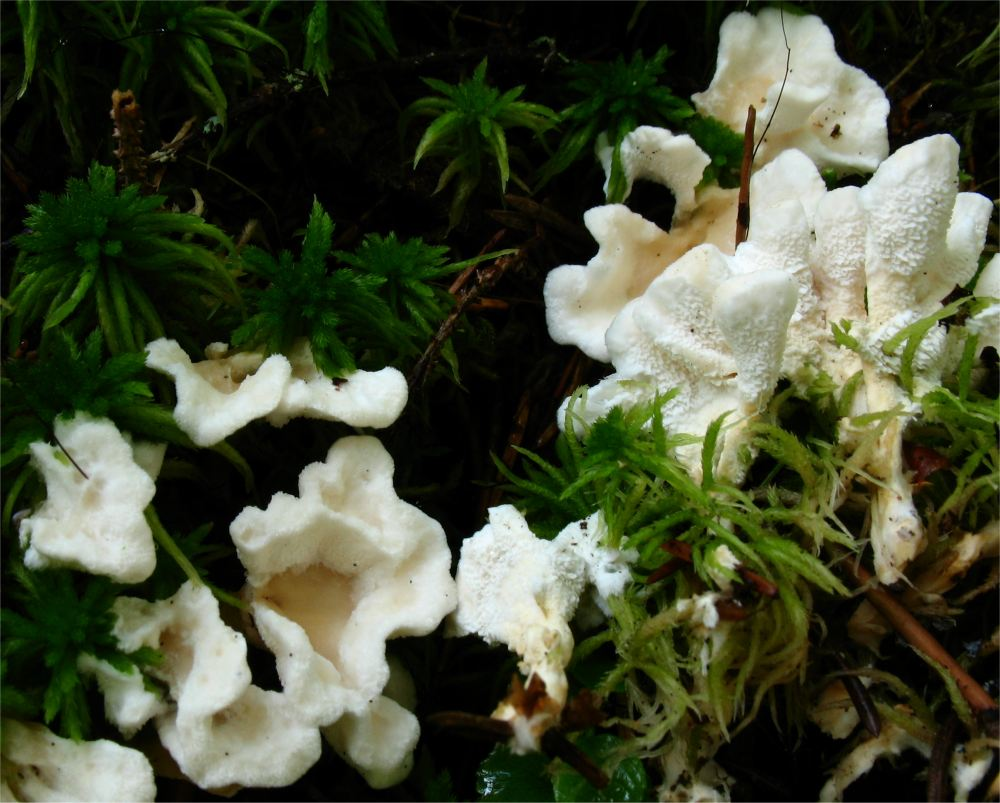
Sistotrema confluens

Molecular research, based on cladistic analysis of DNA sequences, has confirmed Donk's placement of the Hydnaceae as a family within the Cantharellales. The precise boundaries of the family have not been investigated, but it appears that the type and related species of the genus Sistotrema belong within the Hydnaceae, as well as most species of Hydnum itself. These Sistotrema species have poroid basidiocarps and are not closely related to the majority of "Sistotrema" species which may belong within the Clavulinaceae. The status of Corallofungus has not been investigated. According to the Dictionary of the Fungi (10th edition, 2008), the family contains 9 genera and 190 species.

The placement of the Hydnaceae as a family within the Cantharellales:

- Cantharellales
  - Ceratobasidiaceae
  - - Botryobasidiaceae
    - - Tulasnellaceae
      - Hydnaceae

Phylogenetic tree presenting the current opinion on relationships among genera:

- Hydnaceae
  - Burgoa + Sistotrema III
  - - - Bergerella + Bryoclavula
      - Minimedusa
    - - - Neoburgoa
        - - Sistotremella
          - - Multiclavula
            - - - Bulbilla
                - Clavulina + Membranomyces
              - - Rogersiomyces
                - Burgella + Sistotrema II
      - - - Sistotrema sensu stricto
          - Hydnum
        - - Craterellus
          - Cantharellus

== Description ==
The fruit bodies of species in the family have caps and stems that are usually centrally attached. Colors typically range from white to yellow to orange, and the teeth are typically lighter than the cap surface. The flesh is fleshy and brittle, and monomitic (consisting of generative hyphae only). The generative hyphae are thin-walled, branched, contain septa, and have clamp connections. Spores range in shape from roughly spherical to egg-shaped, have a smooth surface, and are colorless. A distinctive characteristic of many species in the family is the structure of the hymenium (spore-bearing surface), which consists of pendant, toothlike spines.

== Habitat and distribution ==
All species within the Hydnaceae are believed to be ectomycorrhizal, forming a mutually beneficial relationships with the roots of living trees and other plants. Basidiocarps typically occur on the ground or in leaf litter in woodland. The family has a cosmopolitan distribution.

== Economic importance ==
Several species of Hydnum are edible and Hydnum repandum is commercially collected and marketed in Europe, often under the French name pied de mouton. In North America, the related Hydnum umbilicatum is also commercially collected, sometimes under the name "sweet tooth".
