= Bryoclavula phycophila =

Scientific classification
- Kingdom: Fungi
- Division: Basidiomycota
- Class: Agaricomycetes
- Order: Cantharellales
- Genus: Bryoclavula
- Species: B. phycophila

Binomial name
- Bryoclavula phycophila H.Masumoto & Y.Degawa (2020)
- Holotype: Kikuchi, Japan

Species of lichen

Bryoclavula phycophila is a species of fungus of uncertain familial placement in the order Cantharellales. The fungus forms a tiny, club‑shaped basidiolichen—a lichen in which the fungal partner belongs to the Basidiomycota—described in 2020 from a humid gorge in Kumamoto Prefecture, Japan. The fungus makes its living in partnership with single‑celled green algae and produces minute white fruiting bodies only a few millimetres tall that stand above fading moss cushions on shaded rock faces during late autumn and early winter. The species represents an entirely new genus, Bryoclavula, and adds another lichen‑forming lineage to the otherwise mushroom‑dominated order Cantharellales.

== Taxonomy ==
When Hiroshi Masumoto and Yousuke Degawa first collected the fungus in 2018, its combination of lichenised lifestyle and club‑shaped ("clavarioid") fruiting bodies suggested affinity with the genus Multiclavula, the main basidiolichen group known at the time. Molecular comparisons of large‑subunit ribosomal DNA instead placed it in a separate, well‑supported branch of the Cantharellales, sister to the saprotrophic genus Minimedusa and a subset of Sistotrema species, but clearly outside Multiclavula. Because no existing genus accommodated this lineage, the authors erected Bryoclavula to contain the single new species, B. phycophila. The generic name combines the Greek bryo‑ (moss) with the Latin diminutive clavula, referring to the small club‑shaped ("clavate") fruiting bodies produced among bryophytes, while the species epithet phycophila ("alga‑loving") alludes to its algal partner.

Phylogenetically, Bryoclavula falls within a diverse "CHS assemblage" of the Cantharellales that also includes ectomycorrhizal tooth fungi such as Hydnum and several bulbil‑forming lichenicolous fungi, showing that mutualisms with plants and algae have evolved repeatedly in this order. Single-cell isolation and 18S-rDNA sequencing of the Nagano specimen's photobiont place it in a previously undescribed lineage of the Trebouxiophyceae, indicating that Bryoclavula phycophila harbours an as-yet-unnamed algal partner.

== Description ==
The lichen lacks a differentiated thallus; instead, the fungal hyphae (microscopic, thread‑like filaments) loosely wrap individual spherical algal cells, creating an amorphous, bright‑green, gelatinous film on the moss surface. Transmission‑electron (TEM) micrographs show each algal cell contains a pyrenoid, a protein body involved in carbon fixation, surrounded by starch grains, indicating affiliation with a chlorococcoid alga rather than the filamentous cyanobacteria sometimes found in lichens. TEM of the same material shows electron-dense granules accumulating inside the fungal hyphae, a feature otherwise reported only from some Multiclavula lichens.

Above this algal layer rise the fruiting bodies (technically basidiomata), single or rarely forked clubs 1.6–3.8 mm tall and 0.2–0.6 mm wide, coloured whitish to pale cream. A translucent stipe up to half the total height anchors each club. Internally, the club is filled with parallel hyphae (the trama). The outer fertile layer (the hymenium) bears basidia—flask‑shaped cells 25–50 micrometres (μm) long that each produce four to six slender sterigmata, the projections that generate basidiospores. The spores themselves are narrowly ellipsoid, averaging 6.1 × 2.9 μm, thin‑walled, smooth and colourless. Cultured on potato dextrose agar the fungus grows slowly, forming velvety cream‑to‑pale‑brown colonies barely 1.3 cm in diameter after two months at 20 °C.

== Habitat and distribution ==
As of its original publication, Bryoclavula phycophila had been recorded only from its type locality in the temperate Kikuchi Valley of central Kyūshū. It fruits on old patches of moss clinging to perpetually damp and shaded volcanic rock at around 564 m elevation. The fungus does not penetrate the moss tissues; instead, it exploits the film of free‑living green algae that coats the bryophyte surface, forming a lichen consortium while leaving the moss largely unaffected. Fruiting occurs from November to December, coinciding with cool, moist conditions. Other lichens, such as Dibaeis absoluta, share the same rock face, but no direct interactions have been observed. The rediscovery of fruit bodies on roadside pebbles at Sugadaira, Nagano Prefecture, extends the species' range roughly 900 km north-east of the type locality and demonstrates that it can colonise bare mineral substrates as well as moss-covered rock surfaces.
