= Mrakia aquatica =

Scientific classification
- Kingdom: Fungi
- Division: Basidiomycota
- Class: Tremellomycetes
- Order: Cystofilobasidiales
- Family: Mrakiaceae
- Genus: Mrakia
- Species: M. aquatica

Binomial name
- Mrakia aquatica (E.B.G. Jones & Slooff) Xin Zhan Liu, F.Y. Bai, M. Groenew. & Boekhout (2015)

Synonyms
- Candida aquatica Cryptococcus aquaticus

Species of fungus

Mrakia aquatica is a species of fungus in the family Mrakiaceae. It is only known from its yeast state, originally isolated from lake water in England.

== Description ==
The species has an optimal growth temperature of 9 °C, but can grow at temperatures as low as 2 °C. When plated on agar it produces smooth, butyrous colonies that are cream. When grown in liquid media it takes approximately 76 hours to reach stationary phase and is very sensitive to decreases in pH. Cells are typically oval or cylindrical, but can be dumb-bell shaped. Mrakia aquatica reproduces through bipolar mypodial budding. It can weakly ferment D-glucose, D-galactose, maltose and melezitose. This species is DBB+. Mrakia aquatica has been studied because of its ability to produce pectinase. It produces polycalacturonase, but not isoenzymes of polygalacturonase, and it has increased activity in the presence of glucose. The species has an interesting trait in that it produces mycocins, which are proteinaceous toxins that either kill or inhibit the ability of fungi that are in the same taxonomic rank or in a related taxonomic rank. The mycocin that M. aquatica produces is only able to kill species in the Cystofilobasidiales.
