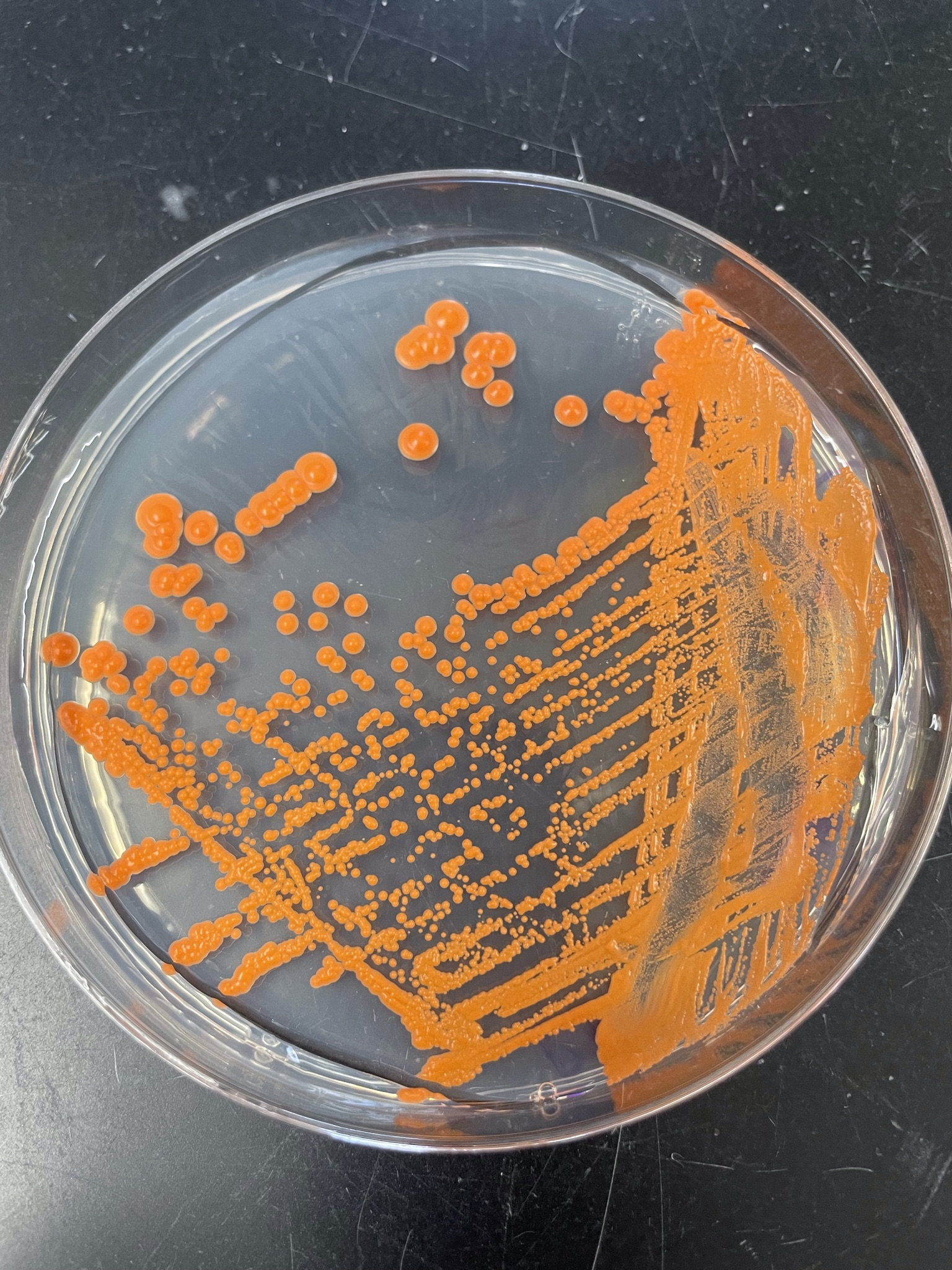
- Culture of Phaffia rhodozyma on PDA plate

Scientific classification
- Kingdom: Fungi
- Division: Basidiomycota
- Class: Tremellomycetes
- Order: Cystofilobasidiales
- Family: Mrakiaceae
- Genus: Phaffia; M.W. Mill., Yoney. & Soneda (1976)

Type species
- Phaffia rhodozyma M.W. Mill., Yoney. & Soneda (1976)

Species
- Phaffia aurantiaca Phaffia australis Phaffia brasiliana Phaffia rhodozyma Phaffia tasmanica

Synonyms
- Xanthophyllomyces Golubev (1995)

= Phaffia =

Genus of fungi

Phaffia is a genus of fungi in the order Cystofilobasidiales. The genus comprises orange-red yeasts that form basidia directly from yeast cells, lack hyphae throughout their life cycle, and produce astaxanthin, a carotenoid used as an additive in animal feed to enhance colour in shrimp, salmon, and poultry eggs and also as an antioxidant in dietary supplements.

The genus was named after the Dutch specialist Herman Phaff who first isolated the type species from slime fluxes of Japanese and North American trees in the 1960s.

The genus Xanthophyllomyces was proposed for the teleomorphic (basidia-bearing) state of Phaffia. Following changes to the International Code of Nomenclature for algae, fungi, and plants, however, the practice of giving different names to teleomorph and anamorph forms of the same fungus was discontinued, meaning that Xanthophyllomyces became a synonym of the earlier name Phaffia.
