= Itersonilia =

Scientific classification
- Domain: Eukaryota
- Kingdom: Fungi
- Division: Basidiomycota
- Class: Tremellomycetes
- Order: Cystofilobasidiales
- Family: Mrakiaceae
- Genus: Itersonilia; Derx (1948)

Type species
- Itersonilia perplexans Derx (1948)

Species
- Itersonilia diksonensis Itersonilia pannonica Itersonilia perplexans

Genus of fungi

Itersonilia is a genus of fungi in the order Cystofilobasidiales. The genus comprises yeasts that have a hyphal state, forming cells that give rise to ballistospores. The type species, Itersonilia perplexans, is a commercially significant plant pathogen causing root canker of parsnip and petal blight on chrysanthemums and other cut flowers.
