= Tillman Gerngross =

Austro-American scientist

- Born: November 15, 1963 (age 62)
- Known for: Founder of multiple biotech companies

Academic background
- Education: Technical University of Vienna
- Academic advisors: Arnold Demain, Anthony Sinskey, JoAnne Stubbe

Academic work
- Discipline: Bioprocess Engineering
- Institutions: Dartmouth College

Tillman Gerngross (born November 15, 1963) is an Austro-American scientist.

He is a professor of bioengineering at the Thayer School of Engineering at Dartmouth College, and an adjunct professor in the departments of biology and chemistry at Dartmouth. Gerngross has been an active inventor and to date his work has resulted in the founding of multiple companies (GlycoFi, Inc., Adimab LLC, Arsanis, Inc., Alector [Nasdaq:ALEC], Avitide, Inc., Amagma, Inc., Ankyra, and Adagio [Nasdaq:ADGI]) and over a dozen U.S. and international patents.

Gerngross was elected a member of the National Academy of Engineering in 2017.

== Academic background ==
Gerngross received a M.S. (Dipl. Ing.) in chemical engineering (1989) and later a Ph.D. in molecular biology from the Technical University of Vienna, Austria. Following his studies in Austria he became a visiting scientist at the Massachusetts Institute of Technology in the laboratory of the late Arnold Demain (1989–91) and later joined the laboratory of Anthony Sinskey and JoAnne Stubbe at MIT as a postdoctoral associate from 1991 to 1993. From 1993 till 1998 he headed the fermentation and process development group at Metabolix Inc., a small startup company in Cambridge, Massachusetts.

In 1998 he left industry to join the faculty at Dartmouth where he focused his research on protein engineering, glycoprotein engineering in yeast, and life cycle analysis of competing manufacturing technologies. In addition to this work, Gerngross’ lab also developed a novel protein expression system based on the industrial fermentation organisms Ralstonia eutropha, formerly Alcaligenes eutrophus. With certain model proteins, this expression system has shown to outperform E. coli, the well proven workhorse of prokaryotic protein expression. The work on Ralstonia eutropha was later expanded in collaboration with Prof. Wood at Princeton University to combine recombinant expression of proteins with the ability to purify them in vivo.

In the late 1990s Gerngross became one of the first vocal critics of biobased processes. By using life cycle assessment tools he demonstrated the shortcomings of bioplastics and similar biomass based technologies intended as a substitute for the petrochemical processes used today. His main findings showed that changing from petrochemical to biomass-based processes often worsens their environmental impact and increases the emissions of carbon dioxide when compared to conventional processes based on fossil fuel stocks. With the recent mandate to increase biofuel content in the United States this area of research has become increasingly important, but to date has failed to guide public policy in the United States.

Arguably, Gerngross' most important biotechnological contribution consisted of humanizing the glycosylation machinery in yeast to produce human therapeutic proteins, including antibodies, with fully human carbohydrate structures. Much of this work was conducted at Glycofi, Inc., a Lebanon, New Hampshire biotechnology startup company that was acquired in 2006 by Merck in a record-setting $400 million transaction.

His work has been frequently cited in the popular press including The Times (London), CNN, Scientific American, BBC, The Guardian, The Economist, New Scientist, Nature Biotechnology and the Los Angeles Times. He has most recently been covered by the Boston Globe, CNBC, First Rounders, Evaluate Pharma, STAT and numerous others.

== Entrepreneurial Activities ==
In 2000 Gerngross co-founded Glycofi, Inc. and served as the company's Chief Scientific Officer until its acquisition by Merck & Co. in the spring of 2006. In the fall of 2006 Dr. Gerngross joined SV Life Sciences as a venture partner where he advises on investments in the bio-therapeutics area. SV Life Sciences manages five investment funds with an aggregate capital of about $1.6 billion. In 2007 Dr. Gerngross co-founded Adimab LLC. with Prof. Dane Wittrup at MIT and Errik Anderson to develop a novel platform for the discovery of human antibodies in yeast. Gerngross stepped down from heading Adimab in February 2023, and was replaced by lawyer Philip Chase. To date the company has raised five rounds of venture financing from Polaris Ventures, SV Life Sciences, Google Ventures, OrbiMed Advisors, and Borealis Ventures and employs about 70 people in Lebanon, New Hampshire.

In 2020, Gerngross cofounded Adagio as a spinout of Adimab which was developing a treatment for COVID-19. In Feb. 2022, Tillman Gerngross resigned as head of the company amid concerns about the efficacy of the drug. The company changed its name to Invivyd and broadened its focus in September 2022. There is currently a pending case of fraud against Tillman related to Adagio in Massachusetts, filed January 2023. In January 2022, Gerngross introduced a new company, Amagma, which also focused on developing antibodies. Amagma was folded in 2023, and the status of its assets are unknown.

== Awards and recognition ==
2004: GlycoFi is awarded Scientific American’s Top 50 Award for the most innovative manufacturing technology.

2006: The readers of Nature Biotechnology select Gerngross amongst the most remarkable and influential biotechnology personalities of the decade.

2007: Gerngross and Glycofi co-founder Charles Hutchinson are named New Hampshire Entrepreneurs of the Year to honor their success with GlycoFi.

2017: Gerngross received the Contrarian Award from Xconomy in 2017.
