= Silvia Restrepo Restrepo =

Colombian biologist

- Born: August 3, 1970 (age 56); Bogota, Colombia
- Education: Universidad de Los Andes, Bogota, Colombia. – Université Pierre et Marie Curie, Paris VI, Paris, France.
- Awards: 2009 – TWAS Award ¨young Scientist in the field of Biology. 2010 – Young Promising Scientist Award Louis Malassis. 2018 – Ordre du Mérite, French Government. 2023 – Jakob Eriksson Prize, The Royal Swedish Academy of Sciences.
- Scientific career
- Fields: Phytopathology, Biology, Microbiology
- Workplaces: President at The Boyce Thompson Institute
- Thesis: ETUDE DE LA STRUCTURE DES POPULATIONS DE XANTHOMONAS AXONOPODIS PV. MANIHOTIS EN COLOMBIE (1999)
- Website: https://orcid.org/0000-0001-9016-1040

Silvia Restrepo Restrepo (August 3, 1970, Bogota, Colombia) is a Colombian biologist, molecular biologist, and phytopathologist recognised for her investigations into different plant diseases, particularly in the Solanaceae Family. She also leads research about food safety and sustainable agriculture. In 2023, she was appointed as the first woman president of the Boyce Thompson Institute associated with Cornell University in Ithaca, New York. She is the former vice president of research and creation at Universidad de Los Andes.

She received the Ordre national du Mérite from the French Government in 2018, and the Jakob Eriksson Prize 2023 for her work in mycology and plant pathology in cassava and potato.

== Early life and education ==
Restrepo was born in Bogota on August 3, 1970. She pursued a biology bachelor's degree at Universidad de Los Andes, and graduated in 1992. She moved to Paris, France to start her master's degree in molecular and cellular biology at Université Pierre et Marie Curie. While she was Initially interested in human genetics, she moved to molecular biology in plants, motivated by her master's professor. She obtained her master's degree in 1993. During her Ph.D. she studied the science of life biology, diversity and adaptation of plants at Université Pierre et Marie Curie, and she graduated in 1999.

== Career ==
She moved to William Earl Fry's laboratory at Cornell University to conduct postdoctoral research in Ithaca, New York between 2000 and 2004. Since 2005, she worked as an assistant and then as an associate professor at Universidad de Los Andes. From 2010 until 2023, she was promoted to full professor at the same institution where she designed a minor in bioinformatics and a graduate program in computational biology. In 2023, she became the first woman president of the Boyce Thompson Institute.

== Research ==
Restropo's research has been relevant in developing cassava varieties resistant to harmful pathogens. During her Ph.D. she studied a bacterial disease caused by Xanthomonas axonopodis pv. manihotis in cassava. Her postdoctoral research was focused on Phytophthora infestans, an oomycete that is responsible for the late blight or potato blight in tomatoes and potatoes.

== Awards ==
In 2009 she received an award from The World Academy of Sciences. In 2010 Restrepo was the first recipient of the Louis Malassis Prize in the category of distinguished scientist. The French government bestowed her with the Ordre du Mérite in 2018, and she received the 2023 Jakob Eriksson Prize from the Royal Swedish Academy of Sciences. She is also a member of the Colombian Academy of Sciences.

== Selected publications ==
- Restrepo, S; Verdier, V (1997). "Geographical Differentiation of the Population of Xanthomonas axonopodis pv. manihotis in Colombia". Applied and Environmental Microbiology. 63 (11): 4427–4434. Bibcode:1997ApEnM..63.4427R. doi:10.1128/aem.63.11.4427-4434.1997. ISSN 0099-2240. PMC 1389287. PMID 16535731.
- Haas, Brian J.; Kamoun, Sophien; Zody, Michael C.; Jiang, Rays H. Y.; Handsaker, Robert E.; Cano, Liliana M.; Grabherr, Manfred; Kodira, Chinnappa D.; Raffaele, Sylvain; Torto-Alalibo, Trudy; Bozkurt, Tolga O.; Ah-Fong, Audrey M. V.; Alvarado, Lucia; Anderson, Vicky L.; Armstrong, Miles R. (2009). "Genome sequence and analysis of the Irish potato famine pathogen Phytophthora infestans". Nature. 461 (7262): 393–398. doi:10.1038/nature08358. ISSN 0028-0836. PMID 19741609.
- Restrepo, Silvia; Tabima, Javier F.; Mideros, Maria F.; Grünwald, Niklaus J.; Matute, Daniel R. (2014-08-04). "Speciation in Fungal and Oomycete Plant Pathogens". Annual Review of Phytopathology. 52 (1): 289–316. doi:10.1146/annurev-phyto-102313-050056. ISSN 0066-4286. PMID 24906125.
- Vargas, Natalia; Cárdenas, Martha; Jiménez, Pedro; Noyd, Robert K.; Restrepo, Silvia (2015). Mycology guide: key terms and concepts. St. Paul, Minnesota, U.S.A: The American Phytopathological Society. ISBN 978-0-89054-468-6.
- Vargas, Natalia; Restrepo, Silvia (2020). "A Checklist of Ectomycorrhizal Mushrooms Associated with Quercus humboldtii in Colombia". In Pérez-Moreno, Jesús; Guerin-Laguette, Alexis; Flores Arzú, Roberto; Yu, Fu-Qiang (eds.). Mushrooms, Humans and Nature in a Changing World. Cham: Springer International Publishing. pp. 425–450. doi:10.1007/978-3-030-37378-8_16. ISBN 978-3-030-37377-1.
- Alejandro, Gaviria Uribe; Esteban, Manrique Reol; Frederica, Di Palma; Germán, Poveda; Sandra, Baena Garzón; Carmenza, Duque Beltrán; Silvia, Restrepo Restrepo; Markus, Eisenhauer; Noriega Escobar, María del Pilar (2021). Ciencia y tecnología : fundamento de la bioeconomía – Propuestas del foco de biotecnología, bioeconomía y medio ambiente. Volumen 3. agritrop.cirad.fr (Report) (in Spanish). Archived from the original on 2021-05-11.
