= Repetobasidiellum =

Scientific classification
- Kingdom: Fungi
- Division: Basidiomycota
- Class: Agaricomycetes
- Order: Cantharellales
- Family: Hydnaceae
- Genus: Repetobasidiellum; J.Erikss. & Hjortstam (1981)

Type species
- Repetobasidiellum fusisporum J.Erikss. & Hjortstam (1981)

Genus of fungi

Repetobasidiellum is a genus of fungi in the Hydnaceae family. It is a monotypic genus, containing the single species Repetobasidiellum fusisporum, which is widespread in northern Europe.
