= Soft rot =

Soft rot may refer to:

- Pichia heedii, the soft rot of the cacti Lophocereus schottii and Drosophila pachea
- Sclerotium cepivorum (soft rot of onions)
- Erwinia sp. (bacterial soft rot)
- Soft rot (wood decay), a type of wood decay.
