= Cystofilobasidiaceae =

Scientific classification
- Kingdom: Fungi
- Division: Basidiomycota
- Class: Tremellomycetes
- Order: Cystofilobasidiales
- Family: Cystofilobasidiaceae; Wells & Bandoni (2001)

Genera
- Cystofilobasidium

Genus of fungi

The Cystofilobasidiaceae are a family of fungi in the order Cystofilobasidiales. Phylogenetic analyses shows that this family is clearly distinct from other yeast-like families of the Tremellomycetes. The family currently contains the single genus Cystofilobasidium. Additional genera previously referred to the Cystofilobasidiaceae are now placed in the Mrakiaceae.
