= Corallofungus =

Scientific classification
- Kingdom: Fungi
- Division: Basidiomycota
- Class: Agaricomycetes
- Order: Cantharellales
- Family: Hydnaceae
- Genus: Corallofungus; Kobayasi (1983)

Type species
- Corallofungus hatakeyamanus Kobayasi (1983)

Genus of fungi

Corallofungus is a genus of fungi in the Hydnaceae family. The genus is monotypic, containing the single species Corallofungus hatakeyamanus, found in Japan.
