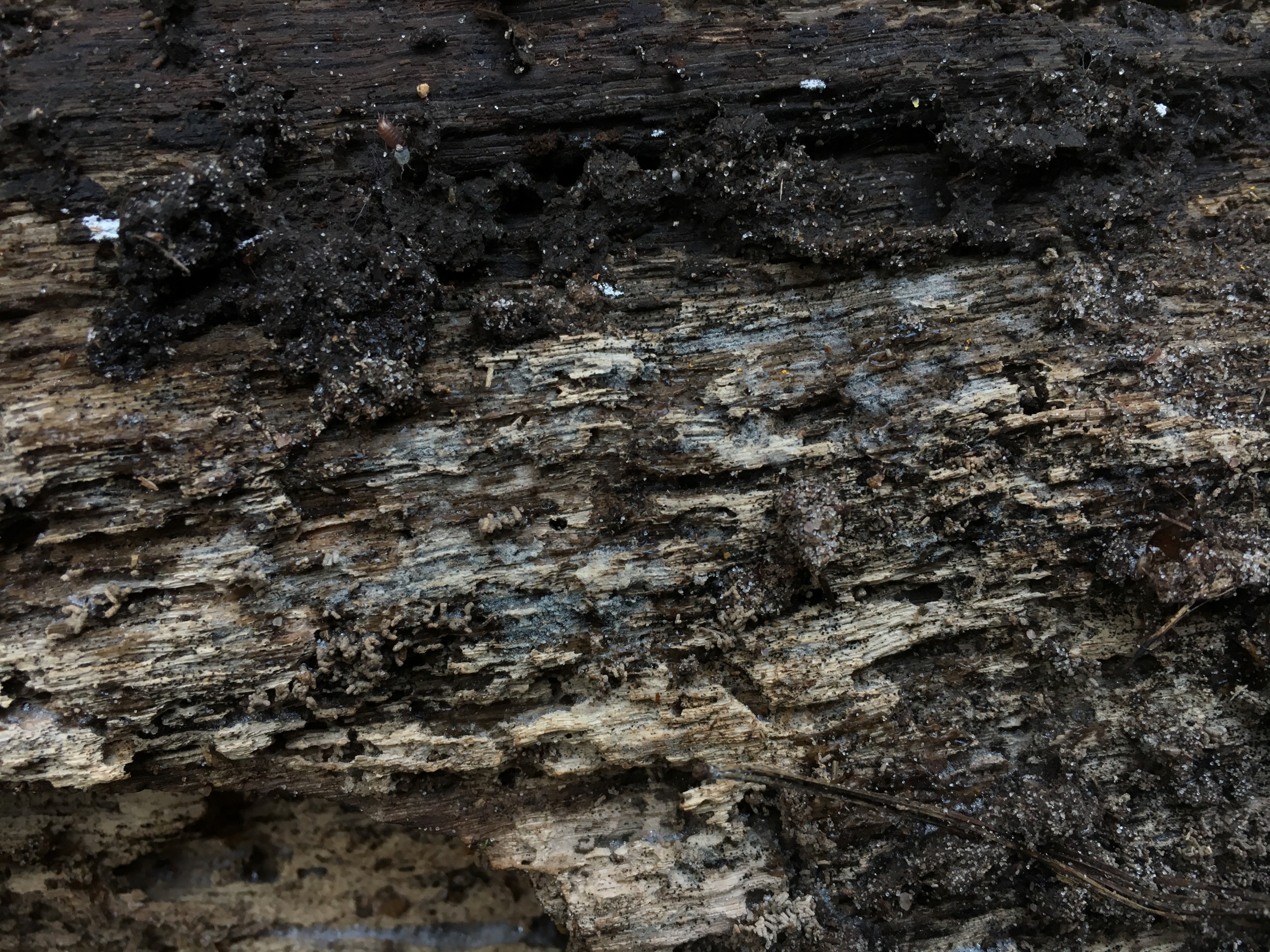
- Paullicorticium pearsonii

Scientific classification
- Kingdom: Fungi
- Division: Basidiomycota
- Class: Agaricomycetes
- Order: Cantharellales
- Family: Hydnaceae
- Genus: Paullicorticium; J.Erikss. (1958)

Type species
- Paullicorticium pearsonii (Bourdot) J.Erikss. (1958)

Species
- P. crassiusculum P. delicatissimum P. pearsonii

= Paullicorticium =

Genus of fungi

Paullicorticium is a genus of resupinate fungi in the Hydnaceae family. The genus contains five species found in North America and Europe.
