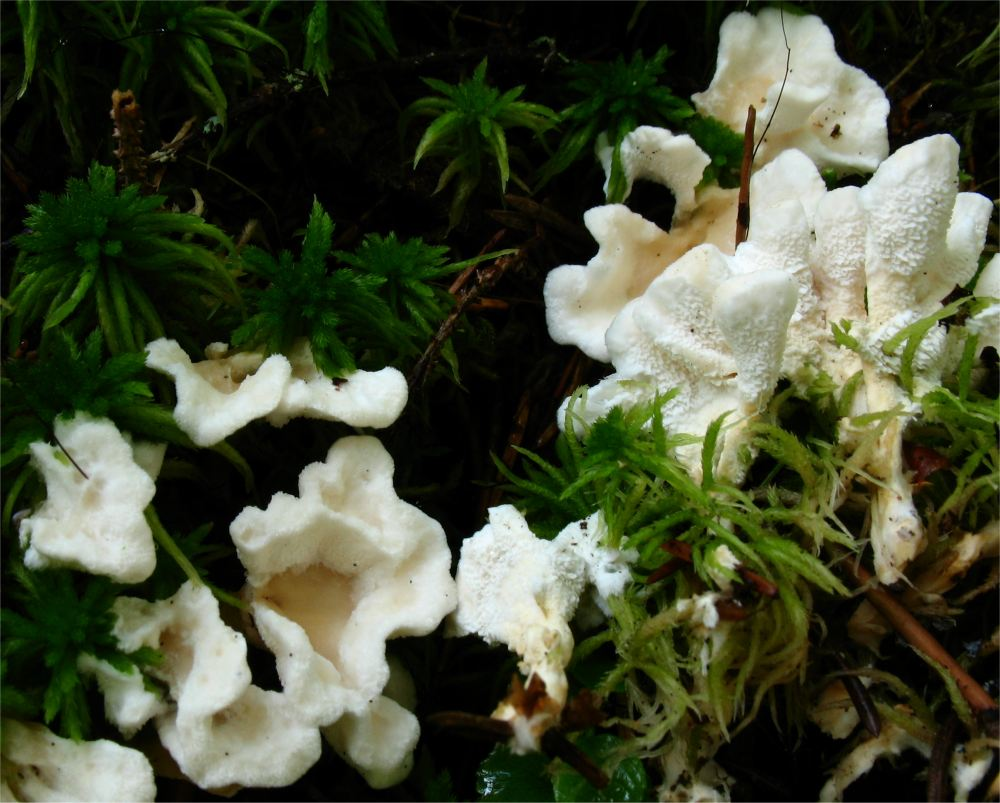
- Sistotrema confluens
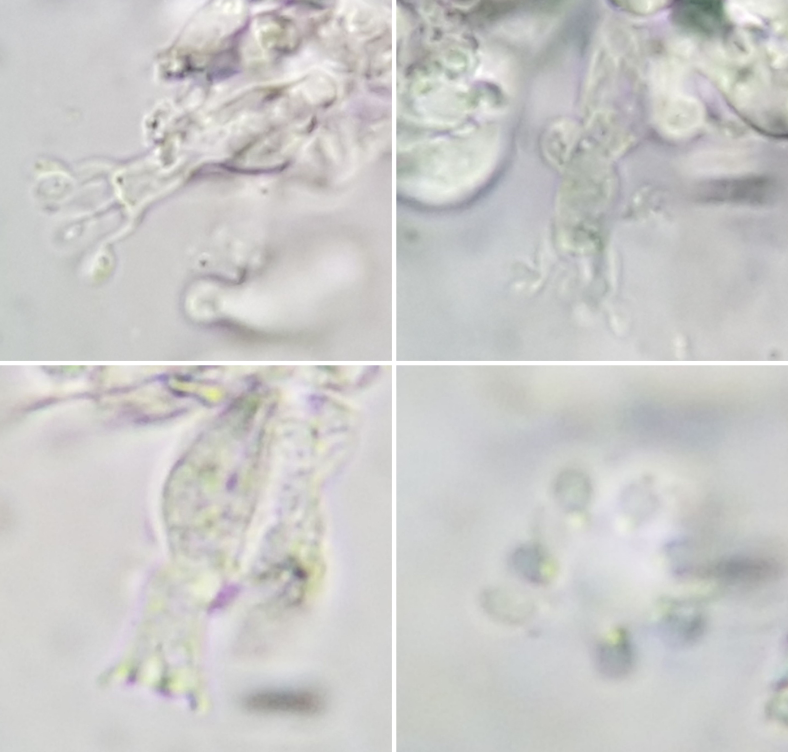
- Sistotrema schultheisii: Urniform basidia with basidiospores.

Scientific classification
- Kingdom: Fungi
- Division: Basidiomycota
- Class: Agaricomycetes
- Order: Cantharellales
- Family: Hydnaceae
- Genus: Sistotrema; Fr. (1821)

Type species
- Sistotrema confluens Pers. (1794)

Synonyms
- Galziniella Parmasto (1968); Heptasporium Bref. (1908); Hydnotrema Link (1833); Ingoldiella D.E.Shaw (1972); Sistotrema Raf. (1820); Urnobasidium Parmasto (1968)

= Sistotrema =

Genus of fungi

Sistotrema is a genus of fungi in the family Hydnaceae. The genus contains at least 55 species and has a worldwide distribution. The type species is Sistotrema confluens Pers. (1794).

== Ecology ==
The genus includes both terricolous and lignicolous species. Most species of Sistotrema are white rotting saprotrophs which often occur on highly decayed wood and on bark of attached, dead branches, but endophytic and ectomycorrhizal nutritional modes also exist in some species. Sistotrema confluens is ectomycorrhizal and S. alboluteum, S. muscicola and S. albopallescens are suspected of being so. In the genus only S. confluens and S. subconfluens are known to grow on soil.

Basidiocarps of Sistotrema generally start spore production very early.

== Morphology ==
Only the type species S. confluens, and S. subconfluens, form stipitate basidiocarps while all other species in the genus form resupinate, corticioid basidiocarps. There is large variation in the configuration of the hymenophore, which can range from strictly hydnoid to poroid, but the dominating type of hymenophore is smooth. Basidiocarps are soft and membranaceous or ceraceous, and can be pelliculose or waxy.

The hyphal system is monomitic and consist of generative hyphae with clamps, which are often ampullate. The subicular hyphae have characteristically oily contents and the septa have perforate parenthesomes.

Basidia are urniform and usually have 6-8 sterigmata, but some species are known to mainly have 2-4 sterigmata. Basidiospores are small, smooth, hyaline and ranging between globose, ellipsoid, oblong or allantoid in shape. They are thin-walled and non-cyanophilous, non-amyloid and non-dextrinoid.

Cystidia are mostly absent but some species have enclosed gloeocystidia or projecting leptocystidia.

== Phylogenetics ==
Sistotrema has been considered a well delimited genus by the urniform basidia, the number of sterigmata and the oily contents of the hyphae. Phylogenetic analyses during the 21st century have, however, shown that Sistotrema is a polyphyletic genus. It is closely related to the genera Hydnum, Clavulina, and Membranomyces. The mycorrhizal species of Sistotrema form a monophyletic group with the mycorrhizal genus Hydnum, while the remaining saprophytic species in the genus have been suggested by Larsson (2007) to be distributed over several other genera.

Species of Sistotrema have stichic basidia which means that the spindle has a longitudinal orientation during meiosis. This character is unique to the Cantharellales, while all other Agaricomycetes have chiastic basidia with a transversely oriented spindle.

Eriksson et al. (1984) mentions that S. heteronemum differs the most from other species in the genus and that its placement in Sistotrema is not certain. It differs from other species in having cyanophilous hyphal walls and basal hyphae which are partly pigmented brown, which according to the authors shows affinity with Botryobasidium.

== Taxonomy ==
The genus was originally designated to a single species by Fries, but microscopical studies has since added many more species to Sistotrema.

== Species ==
- Sistotrema adnatum
- Sistotrema alboluteum
- Sistotrema albopallescens
- Sistotrema athelioides
- Sistotrema autumnale
- Sistotrema biggsiae
- Sistotrema binucleosporum
- Sistotrema botryobasidioides
- Sistotrema brinkmannii
- Sistotrema citriforme
- Sistotrema confluens
- Sistotrema coroniferum
- Sistotrema coronilla
- Sistotrema dennisii
- Sistotrema diademiferum
- Sistotrema efibulatum
- Sistotrema eximum
- Sistotrema farinaceum
- Sistotrema globosa
- Sistotrema hamatum
- Sistotrema heteronemum
- Sistotrema hirschii
- Sistotrema hispanicum
- Sistotrema hypogaeum
- Sistotrema intermedium
- Sistotrema luteoviride
- Sistotrema muscicola
- Sistotrema oblongisporum
- Sistotrema octosporum
- Sistotrema otagense
- Sistotrema pistilliferum
- Sistotrema populicola
- Sistotrema porulosum
- Sistotrema pteriphilum
- Sistotrema pyrisporum
- Sistotrema pyrosporum
- Sistotrema raduloides
- Sistotrema resinicystidium
- Sistotrema schultheisii
- Sistotrema sernanderi
- Sistotrema suballantosporum
- Sistotrema subconfluens
- Sistotrema subtrigonospermum
