= Rogersiomyces =

Scientific classification
- Kingdom: Fungi
- Division: Basidiomycota
- Class: Agaricomycetes
- Order: Cantharellales
- Family: Hydnaceae
- Genus: Rogersiomyces; J.L. Crane & Schokn. 1978

Genus of fungi

Rogersiomyces is a genus of Basidiomycota found in the family Hydnaceae.

The genus was circumscribed by J. Leland Crane and Jean Donze Schoknecht in Amer. J. Bot. vol.65 on page 903 in 1978.

The genus name of Rogersiomyces is in honour of Donald Philip Rogers (1908–2001), who was an American botanist and mycologist, and Professor of Botany and curator of the mycologic collection at the University of Illinois between 1957 - 1976.

== Species ==
As accepted by Species Fungorum;

- Rogersiomyces malaysianus (K. Matsush. & Matsush.) Zmitr. (2016)
- Rogersiomyces okefenokeensis J.L. Crane & Schokn. 1978

Note, the epithet of okefenokeensis refers to Okefenokee Swamp on the Georgia–Florida line.
