= International Society for Plant Pathology =

Global nonprofit and nongovernmental organisation

- Formation: 1968; 58 years ago
- Type: Learned society; Nonprofit
- Purpose: Advancement of global plant health and food security
- Region served: Global
- Official language: English
- President: Jan Leach
- Main organ: International Congress of Plant Pathology
- Website: ISPP

The International Society for Plant Pathology is a global nonprofit institution dedicated to “promoting world-wide plant health and food security.” It was founded in 1968 and the first President of the society was the pioneer British plant pathologist, Ronald Karslake Starr Wood. The International Society for Plant Pathology is a member of the International Union of Biological Sciences (IUBS), the International Union of Microbiological Societies (IUMS), in liaison with the UN Food and Agriculture Organization (FAO).

== History ==
The aim of its founders in 1968 was to disseminate knowledge about plant development and plant diseases and their management. The ISPP also organises the International Congress of Plant Pathology every half-decade which is sponsored by its executive committee. The constituent bodies of the ISPP include a general assembly that convenes every five years during the congress, a council, an executive committee, a secretariat and subject matter committees. At a meeting in Lancaster, UK, in 1994, it was decided to establish the "Glenn Anderson Lecture" at the congress to cover global topics like agriculture and sustainability in the developing world. The society also maintains the World Directory of Plant Pathologists, an initiative of Fran Fisher (University of Florida). Directories were published in 1973 and 1980.

== Publications ==
Since November 1970, the Society has published the International Newsletter on Plant Pathology. In March 2009 established a quarterly journal, Food Security: The Science, Sociology and Economics of Food Production and Access to Food, to address global food security in low-income regions.

== Congress ==
International Congress of Plant Pathology has been held in different cities around the world.

== Presidents ==
The following individuals have served as President of the ISPP:

President	Country of origin	Tenure of office
Ronald Karslake Starr Wood	UK	1968–73
Arthur Kelman	USA	1973–78
Friedrich Grossmann	Germany	1978–83
Johan Dekker	The Netherlands	1983–88
R. James Cook	USA	1988–93
Richard Hamilton	Canada	1993–98
Peter R. Scott	UK	1998–03
Richard Falloon	New Zealand	2003–08
Maria Lodovica Gullino	Italy	2008–13
Greg Johnson	Australia	2013–18
Jan Leach	USA	2018–2023
Yong-Hwan Lee	South Korea	2023-present

== Awards and prizes ==
=== Jakob Eriksson Prize ===
Established in 1923, the Jakob Eriksson Prize for Plant Pathology is awarded at every Congress to a plant scientist who has demonstrated the “creative study of plant pathogens and the processes of disease development in plants.”

=== Fran E. Fisher Award ===
Established in 2018 by the ISPP, this award recognises "individuals who have made an outstanding contribution to both the science of plant pathology and society through dedicating their lives to connecting plant pathologists around the globe so as to improve plant health."
