= Herman Phaff =

Dutch-born American yeast researcher (1913–2001)

Herman Jan Phaff
- Born: May 30, 1913; Winschoten, Netherlands
- Died: August 24, 2001 (aged 88)

Academic background
- Education: Technical University Delft
- Doctoral advisor: Maynard Joslyn

Academic work
- Discipline: Microbiology
- Institutions: UC Davis
- Doctoral students: Arnold Demain

Herman Jan Phaff (May 30, 1913 – August 24, 2001) was a scientist who specialised in yeast ecology. He was born in the Netherlands before moving to California at age of 26. He was active in Californian universities until his death. During his career he accumulated thousands of strains of yeast from the wild, and described 60 new taxa of yeast.

== Biography ==
=== Early life and education ===
Phaff was born in Winschoten, Netherlands. His family owned a winery where he became interested in the microorganisms involved in brewing beer and fermenting wine. He studied chemical engineering at Technical University Delft, writing a dissertation on the pectinases of Penicillium chrysogenum. On the advice of Albert Kluyver, when he was 26 years old he moved to California to study as a post-graduate at UC Berkeley.

=== Career ===
While at Berkeley, Phaff worked in Emil Mrak's laboratory, who is said to have had a major influence on him. When he first arrived, he was most interested in studying fruit juices, but Mrak asked him to work on yeasts, knowing he had worked in Kluyver's laboratory. His PhD was supervised by Maynard Joslyn and focussed on yeast taxonomy, ecology and physiology. After completing his PhD in 1943, he accepted a faculty position at Berkeley, before moving to the food science department of UC Davis in 1954. During the 1950s, he wrote several classic scientific papers, published in Nature on yeast pectinases with Arnold Demain. Whilst at UC Davis, he worked with the Chinese born food scientist, Bor S. Luh. In 1969 he was named University of California at Davis Faculty Research Lecturer. In 1985 he co-authored a definitive book on viticulture with Maynard Amerine. Despite officially retiring in 1983, he maintained a busy laboratory and continued to conduct research daily. His contributions to the study of yeast ecology are unparalleled. At various times in his career he was an editor of several scientific journals including the Yeast Newsletter, the Journal of Bacteriology, the Canadian Journal of Microbiology and the International Journal of Systematic Bacteriology.

=== Species classification ===
Phaff was a pioneer of using molecular techniques to classify yeasts, along with his colleagues and students, Phaff described over 60 yeast taxa through his career. In 1976, the yeast genus Phaffia (in the Cystofilobasidiaceae family) was isolated from tree exudates and was named after Phaff, by Martin Miller and two Japanese colleagues, in recognition of his contributions to yeast taxonomy and ecology. The species, Phaffia rhodozyma is economically important today because it synthesises the carotenoid pigment, astaxanthin.

In 1997, Yuzo Yamada published Phaffomyces, which is a genus of fungi within the Saccharomycetales order, also named in his honour.

== Yeast collection ==
Through his 60-year career he collected 6400 yeast strains from animals, soil and plants (including over 1000 from cacti), from countries all around the world. There are few collections of microbial cultures so large that have been accumulated by institutions and likely none so large that have been accumulated by any other single researcher. The collection, known as the Phaff Yeast Culture Collection contains 400 of the 700 identified species of yeast and has been described as priceless, with a large number of wild type isolates making it unique amongst yeast collections. According to the current curator, 80% of the yeasts in the collection are not available from other sources. A 2003 yeast symposium organized by FEMS (Federation of European Microbiological Societies) was named in his memory and the talks were summarised in a special edition of International Microbiology.

== Described taxa ==
- Cryptococcus cereanus (1974) from decaying Cereus cacti
- Pichia amethionina (1978) from decaying Cereoid cacti and Drosophila flies feeding on them.
- Pichia cactophila (1978) from decaying cacti and Drosophila flies feeding on them.
- Pichia heedii (1978) from the soft rot of the cacti Lophocereus schottii and Drosophila pachea.
- Sporobolomyces singulari (1962) from the frass of Scolytus tsugae feeding on Western Hemlock (Tsuga heterophylla)
- Bullera tsugae (1962) from the frass of Scolytus tsugae feeding on Western Hemlock (Tsuga heterophylla)
- Cryptococcus skinneri (1962) from the frass of Scolytus tsugae feeding on Western Hemlock (Tsuga heterophylla)
- Candida oregonensis (1962) from the frass of Scolytus tsugae feeding on Western Hemlock (Tsuga heterophylla)
- Torulopsis sonorensis (1976) from decaying parts of cacti, most commonly the Organ Pipe Cactus (Stenocereus thurberi), and from Drosophila mojavensis.
- Pichia opuntiae (1979) from the cladodes of Opuntia inermis in Australia and from the decaying parts of Cereoid cacti in North America.
