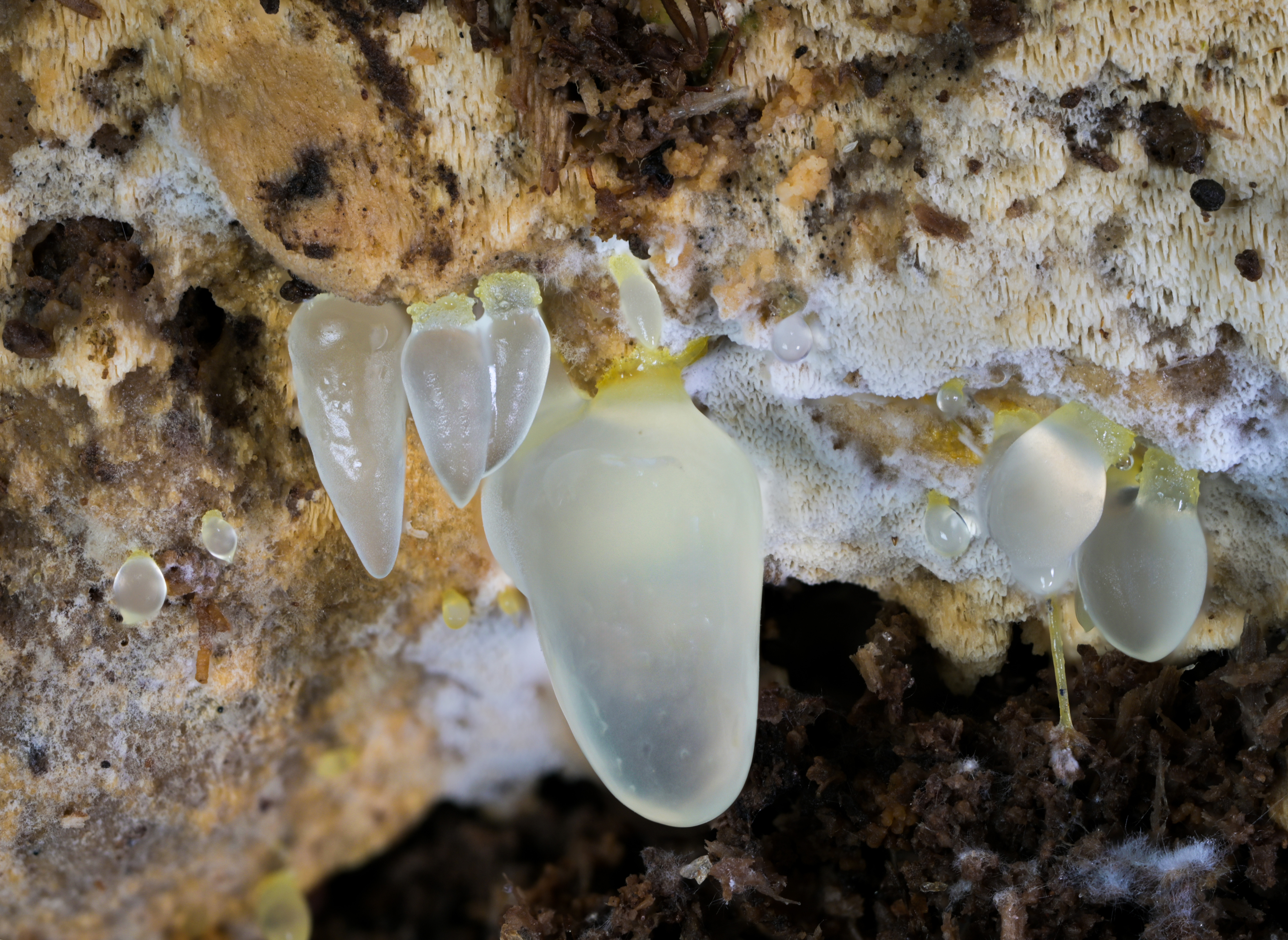

Scientific classification
- Kingdom: Fungi
- Division: Basidiomycota
- Class: Agaricomycetes
- Order: Cantharellales
- Family: Hydnaceae
- Genus: Gloeomucro; R.H.Petersen (1980)

Type species
- Gloeomucro nodosus (Linder) R.H. Petersen (1980)

Species
- G. asahimontanus G. chlorinus G. flavus G. guianensis G. limpidus G. luteodiscus G. nodosus G. ventricosus G. yakusimensis

= Gloeomucro =

Genus of fungi

Gloeomucro is a genus of fungi in the Hydnaceae family. The widespread genus contains nine species.
