= Arnold Demain =

American microbiologist (1927–2020)

Arnold L. Demain
- Born: April 26, 1927; Brooklyn, New York, US
- Died: April 3, 2020 (aged 92)

Academic background
- Education: Michigan State, University of California, Davis
- Doctoral advisor: Herman Phaff

Academic work
- Discipline: Industrial Microbiology
- Institutions: Merck Sharp & Dohme, MIT, Drew University

Arnold L. Demain (April 26, 1927 – April 3, 2020) was an American microbiologist. During his 60-year career, he gained a reputation in the field of industrial microbiology. He was the Professor of Industrial Microbiology in the Biology Department at MIT and Founder and Head of Department of Fermentation Microbiology at Merck & Co. Demain was described as "one of the world's leading industrial microbiologists" and as "a scientist constantly in the forefront of industrial microbiology and biotechnology." He was "a pioneer in research on the elucidation and regulation of the biosynthetic pathways leading to the penicillins and cephalosporins" and "instrumental in the development of the beta-lactam industry". One feature of Demain's work, according to Microbiology Australia, was his "ability to undertake fundamental research on systems with clear industrial applications, recognising that biodiscovery is the start of the road that includes strain improvement to achieve levels of product synthesis that warrant further investment to take products into the marketplace." Demain published over 500 papers, co-edited or co-authored fourteen books, and took out 21 U.S. patents.

== Early life and education ==
Demain was born in Brooklyn, New York, on April 26, 1927. His grandparents were all immigrants from the Austrian-Hungarian Empire. As a boy he worked delivering groceries and was also a stock boy at Lord & Taylor's department store in Manhattan. Demain's father, Henry, was in the pickle manufacturing business, managing a canning and pickling plant for Vita Foods Corp. in Chestertown, Maryland. Demain's uncles Ben and Seymour operated another pickling factory, Demain Foods Co., in Ayden, North Carolina. According to one source, "Henry was a leader in the pickle business, working for Fields and then Bloch and Guggenheimer in New York before setting up the pickle plant in Chestertown." Demain himself said that his grandfather, Joseph Demain, "had sold pickles for years in one of New York's major market areas." Demain attended five different public elementary schools and three different public high schools in Brooklyn and the Bronx, and graduated high school at age 16.

Demain attended Michigan State College briefly, then joined the U.S. Navy in 1945 and spent two years in Philadelphia caring for amputees who were members of the armed forces who had been injured in the war. Demain returned to Michigan State in 1947, earning B.S. and M.S. degrees in bacteriology from the Department of Microbiology and Public Health in 1949 and 1950 respectively. His master's research topic was the spoilage and softening of pickles during fermentation, a phenomenon that, he concluded, was probably caused by pectic enzymes. At Michigan State, Demain met and married a fellow student, Joanna ("Jody") Kaye from Youngstown, Ohio.

Demain went to the University of California's Department of Food Science, which was first at the Berkeley campus and then at Davis working with Herman Phaff. He began work on his Ph.D. project on polygalacturonase of Saccharomyces fragilis. The project resulted in four papers on pectic enzymes, one of which published in Nature. At Berkeley, he was in charge of the cultures in UC's yeast collection. With Phaff, Demain performed one of the first examples of affinity chromatography, using a pectic acid. Demain received his Ph.D. in 1954.

== Career ==
In early 1954, Demain moved to Danville, Pennsylvania, where he worked as a research microbiologist for Merck Sharp & Dohme, studying the synthesis of penicillin. His work helped identify the amino acids that form the nucleus of penicillin, established the mechanisms that enable primary metabolites and carbon sources to regulate secondary metabolite synthesis, and demonstrated that penicillin was the product of synthesis and inactivation during fermentation. In late 1955, Demain moved on to Merck's penicillin research laboratories in Rahway, New Jersey, where he worked on fermentation microbiology, beta-lactam antibiotics, flavor nucleotides, and microbial nutrition.

In 1964 when he was asked to form a new department at Merck that would involve the improvement of product biosynthesis in microbial strains. Demain named it the Department of Fermentation Microbiology Demain "directed research and development on processes for monosodium glutamate, vitamin B12, streptomycin, riboflavin, cephamycin, fosfomycin, and interferon inducers," and "elucidated the mechanism by which the biosynthesis of cephalosporin in Cephalsporium acremonium was stimulated by the presence of methionine – a new mechanism which had not been reported before." The team managed to boost production yields of vitamin B12. The work done under Demain's direction in Rahway has been described in Microbiology Australia as "remarkable" in its "level of innovation," in that it identified "novel biochemical pathways" that improved "natural levels of production" several thousandfold.

In 1968, Demain was invited by Nevin Scrimshaw to become a full professor at Massachusetts Institute of Technology. The next year Demain became Professor of Industrial Microbiology in Scrimshaw's department at MIT and set up a fermentation microbiology laboratory there. Demain stayed at MIT for the next 32 years. In 1970, Demain went to Prague to present the closing Plenary Session address at the first Genetics of Industrial Microorganisms Symposium. He spoke on the "marriage of genetics and industrial microbiology."

At MIT, Demain and his team pioneered research on the elucidation and regulation of the biosynthetic pathways leading to penicillins and cephalosporins. Demain's MIT research led to "a breakthrough discovery of a key enzyme in cephalosporin biosynthesis –deacetoxycephalosporin C synthetase ('expandase'). The discovery of this enzyme established the role of penicillin as an intermediate in cephalosporin C biosynthesis and disproved the previous hypothesis that these two separate end products of C. acremonium were formed by a branched secondary metabolic pathway."

In the mid-1990s, Demain and his team "started a series of NASA-sponsored experiments to determine the effect of simulated microgravity (SMG) on secondary metabolism" and "found that regulation of microbial processes under SMG was quite different from that at normal gravity." In his last MIT projects he studied Clostridium tetani and C. difficile with the aim of facilitating the production of improved tetanus and antibiotic-associated diarrhea vaccines. The effort was successful. Summing up his years at MIT, Demain later said that he "was very lucky...to have had a fantastic group of bright and hardworking visiting scientists, postdoctoral associates, graduate students, undergraduate students and high school students. I owe all my success to them and my two amazing lab supervisors, Nadine A. Solomon and Aiqi Fang....Success at MIT would not have been possible without them."

In 2001, Demain joined the Research Institute for Scientists Emeriti (RISE), at Drew University. In this capacity he trained undergraduate students in conducting research in microbial chemistry until his retirement in 2019.

== Other professional activities ==
Demain was elected president of the Society for Industrial Microbiology in 1990, and became a member of the National Academy of Sciences (U.S.) in 1994, the Mexican Academy of Sciences in 1997, and the Hungarian Academy of Science in 2002. He was on the Board of Governors of the American Academy of Microbiology, has served as a member of the U.S. National Committee for the International Union of Microbiological Sciences (IUMS), and was a delegate to the 2002 General Assembly in Paris. He has been honorary consultant for the Fujian Institute of Microbiology and the Shanghai Institute of Pharmaceutical Industry in The People's Republic of China. In addition, he was a member of the scientific advisory boards of Tetravitae Bioscience and of Dyadic International, and was also on the advisory board of Codexis, Inc. In 1971, he was involved with the Cetus Corporation and served as an advisor.

== Honors and awards ==
Demain has received honorary doctorates from the University of Leon (Spain), Ghent University (Belgium), Technion (Israel), Michigan State, and University of Münster (Germany). The August 2010 special issue of The Journal of Antibiotics celebrated Demain's career, noting that he had "established and maintained a renowned reputation within the field of industrial microbiology."

== Personal life ==
Arny Demain was married to Joanna (Kaye) Demain for 68 years; they had two children, Pamela and Jeffrey. He died from complications of COVID-19.
