= Pichia heedii =

Scientific classification
- Kingdom: Fungi
- Division: Ascomycota
- Class: Pichiomycetes
- Order: Pichiales
- Family: Pichiaceae
- Genus: Pichia
- Species: P. heedii

Binomial name
- Pichia heedii Phaff, Starmer, M. Miranda & M.W. Mill.

Species of fungus

Pichia heedii is a species of yeast in the family Saccharomycetaceae. Described in 1978, it was found growing on a dead senita cactus plant (Lophocereus schottii) in the Sonoran Desert of Baja California, Mexico. The species was named to honor William B. Heed and his contributions to the study of desert-adapted yeasts.
