= International Microbiology =

- Discipline: Microbiology
- Language: English
- Edited by: José Berenguer

Publication details
- Former names: Microbiología Española, Microbiología SEM
- History: 1947–present
- Publisher: Springer Science+Business Media on behalf of the Spanish Society of Microbiology
- Frequency: Quarterly
- Open access: Hybrid
- Impact factor: 2.3 (2023)

Standard abbreviations
- ISO 4: Int. Microbiol.

Indexing
- CODEN: INMIFW
- ISSN: 1139-6709 (print); 1618-1905 (web)
- LCCN: 00206485
- OCLC no.: 1026611551

Links
- Journal homepage; Online archive

International Microbiology is a quarterly peer-reviewed scientific journal published by Springer Science+Business Media and the official journal of the Spanish Society of Microbiology. It covers all aspects of microbiology. The journal was established in 1947 as Microbiología Española and renamed Microbiología SEM in 1985 before obtaining its current title in 1998.

== Abstracting and indexing ==
The journal is abstracted and indexed in Science Citation Index Expanded, Scopus, Biological Abstracts, MEDLINE, and Excerpta Medica. According to the Journal Citation Reports, the journal has a 2023 impact factor of 2.3.
