= Burgoa =

Scientific classification
- Domain: Eukaryota
- Kingdom: Fungi
- Division: Basidiomycota
- Class: Agaricomycetes
- Order: Cantharellales
- Family: Cantharellaceae
- Genus: Burgoa; Goid.

Genus of fungi

Burgoa is a genus of fungi belonging to the family Cantharellaceae.

The species of this genus are found in Europe and Northern America.

Species:

- Burgoa alutacea Goid.
- Burgoa angulosa Diederich, Lawrey & Etayo
- Burgoa anomala (Hotson) Goid.
- Burgoa hutsonii Goid.
- Burgoa moriformis Diederich, Ertz & Coppins
- Burgoa nigra (Hotson) Goid.
- Burgoa pisi S.Q.He & D.Z.Tang
- Burgoa splendens Diederich & Coppins
- Burgoa verzuoliana Goid.
