= Nigrohydnum =

Scientific classification
- Kingdom: Fungi
- Division: Basidiomycota
- Class: Agaricomycetes
- Order: Polyporales
- (unranked): incertae sedis
- Genus: Nigrohydnum; Ryvarden (1987)

Type species
- Nigrohydnum nigrum Ryvarden (1987)

Genus of fungi

Nigrohydnum is a fungal genus in the order Polyporales. It contain a single species, Nigrohydnum nigrum, a rare toothed polypore known from only a few collections in Brazil.

== Description ==
The fruit body of the fungus is characterized by its purplish-black, semicircular caps with spines on the cap underside. The caps, which measure up to 3 cm (1.2 in) wide by 5 cm (2 in) broad and 1 cm (0.4 in) thick at the base, become tough and woody when dried. The spines on the cap underside are up to 3 mm long, and are densely packed, numbering about 1–3 per millimetre. Nigrohydnum has a dimitic hyphal system, containing both generative hyphae with clamp connections and skeletal hyphae. The spores of Nigrohydnum nigrum are cylindrical, thin-walled, hyaline, and measure 4.5–2 μm. They are inamyloid.

== Distribution ==
The type of the fungus was collected in Serra do Aracá State Park, in the state of Amazonas, Brazil. It was later reported from Paraná. After an old voucher specimen was discovered in a herbarium and identified to be N. nigrum, the geographic distribution was extended to the Atlantic rainforest of Porto Alegre, Rio Grande do Sul state, in Southern Brazil.
