= Parenthesome =

Cell structure in fungi

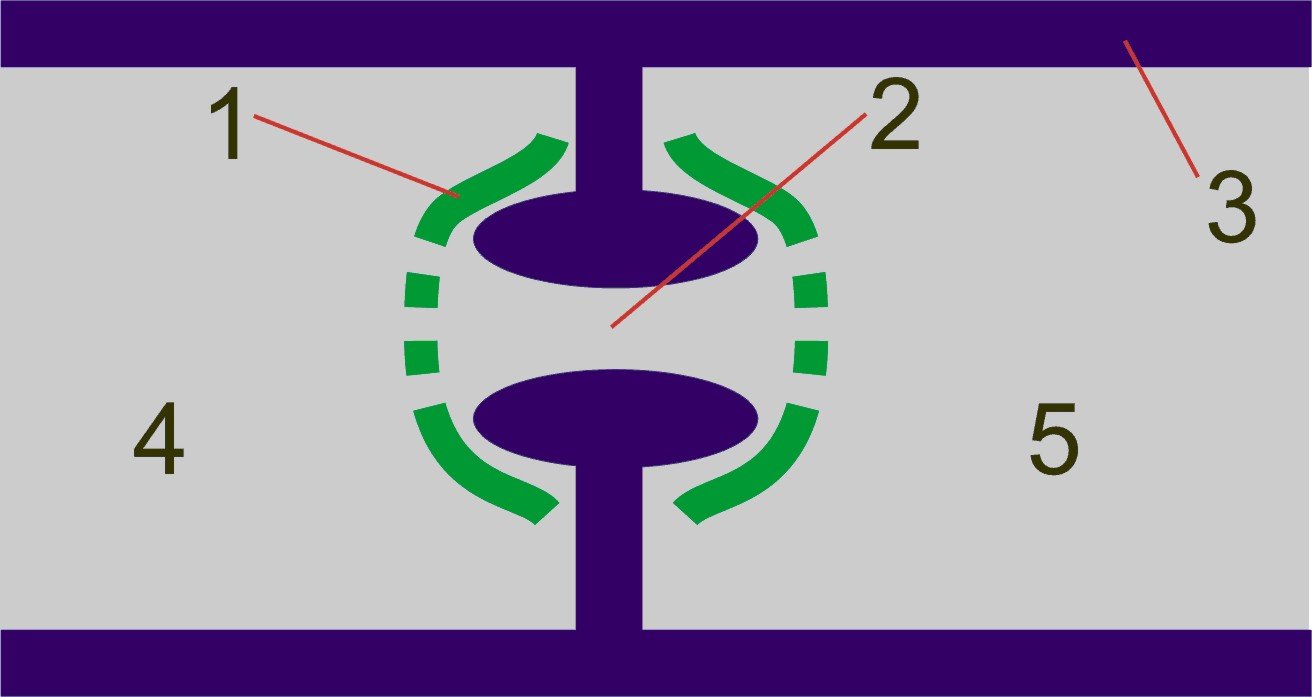
Diagram of situation of the fungal organelle parenthesome in the cell

Within the cells of some members of basidiomycetes fungi are found microscopic structures called parenthesomes or septal pore caps. They are shaped like parentheses and found on either side of pores in the dolipore septum which separates cells within a hypha. Their function has not been established, and their composition has not been fully elucidated. The variations in their appearance are useful in distinguishing individual species. Generally, they are barrel shaped, with an endoplasmic reticulum covering.

== See also ==
- Pit connection
