= Dolipore septum =

Dividing walls between cells of some fungi

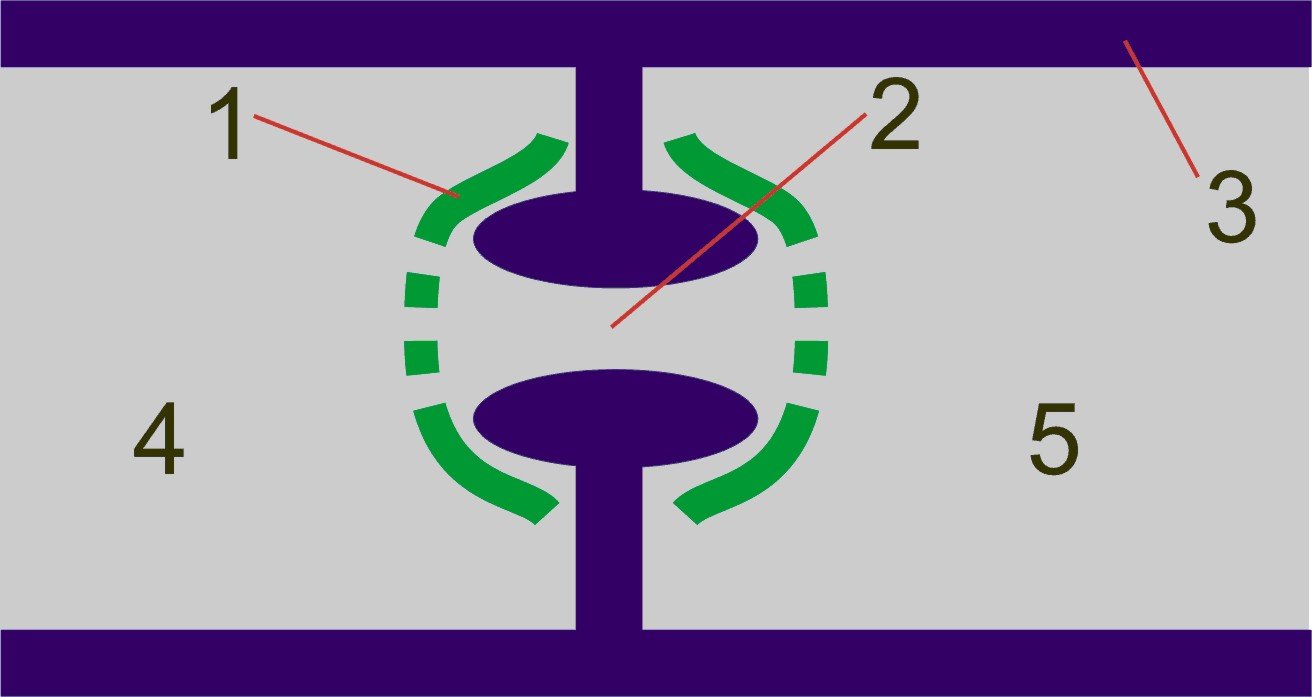
In hyphae of basidiomycete fungi, parenthesomes (1) "cap" a dolipore septum (2). The cell wall (3) swells around the septal pore to form a barrel-shaped ring. Perforations in the parenthesome allow cytoplasm to flow between (4) and (5).

Dolipore septa are specialized dividing walls between cells (septa) found in almost all species of fungi in the phylum Basidiomycota. Unlike most fungal septa, they have a barrel-shaped swelling around their central pore, which is about 0.1–0.2 μm wide. This structure is typically capped at either end by specialized membranes, called "parenthesomes" (after their parenthesis-like appearance under a microscope) or simply "pore caps".

Dolipore septa vary significantly between monokaryotic and dikaryotic hyphae, which form at different points in basidiomycete life cycles. In monokaryotic but not dikaryotic hyphae, the parenthesomes are continuous with the endoplasmic reticulum, and the septal walls are constructed from different material than the cell walls. All dolipore septa can allow cytoplasm, and sometimes mitochondria, to flow through their pores; those in monokaryotic hyphae have perforated parenthesomes, which allow cell nuclei to flow through as well.

The structure was first described by Royall Moore and James McAlear in 1962.
