= Mrakiaceae =

Scientific classification
- Kingdom: Fungi
- Division: Basidiomycota
- Class: Tremellomycetes
- Order: Cystofilobasidiales
- Family: Mrakiaceae; X.Z. Liu, F.Y. Bai, M. Groenew. & Boekhout (2015)

Genus of fungi

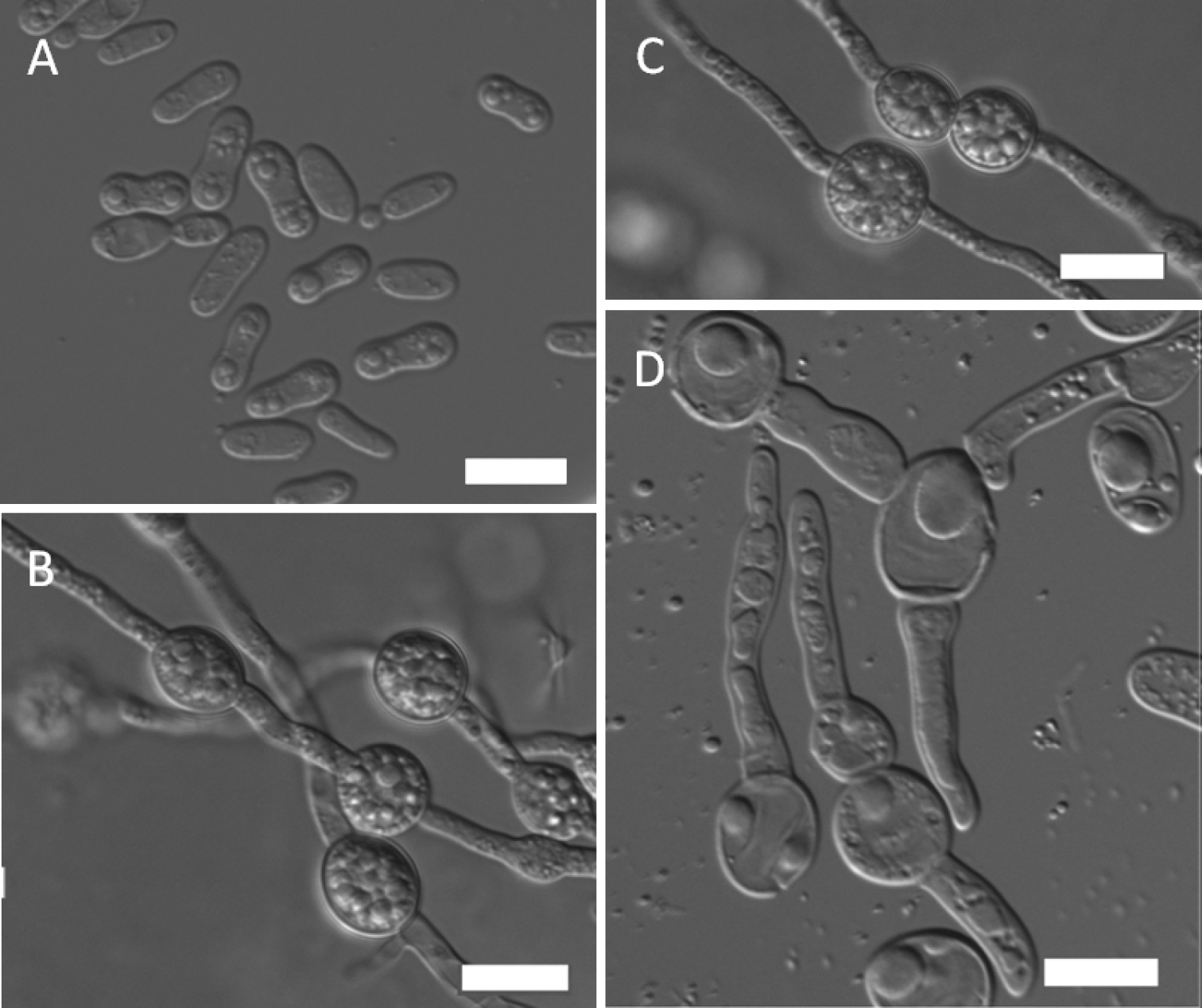
Morphology of Mrakia panshiensis: A budding cells; B true hyphae with clamp connections and teliospores; C teliospores in pairs; D teliospores produced with a bud-like projection

The Mrakiaceae are a family of fungi in the order Cystofilobasidiales. Phylogenetic analyses shows that this family is clearly distinct from other yeast-like families of the Tremellomycetes. The family had six genera in 2015.

== Genera ==
As accepted by GBIF and Species Fungorum;

- Itersonilia Derx (4)
- Krasilnikovozyma X.Z.Liu, F.Y.Bai, M.Groenew. & Boekhout, 2015 (11)
- Mrakia Y.Yamada & Komag., 1987 (22)
- Phaffia M.W.Mill., Yoney. & Soneda 1976 (1)
- Tausonia Babeva, 1998 (5)
- Udeniomyces T.Nakase & A.Takematsu, 1992 (15)
- Vustinia A.V. Kachalkin, Turchetti & Yurkov (2019)

Figures in brackets are approx. how many species per family.
