= Jakob Eriksson =

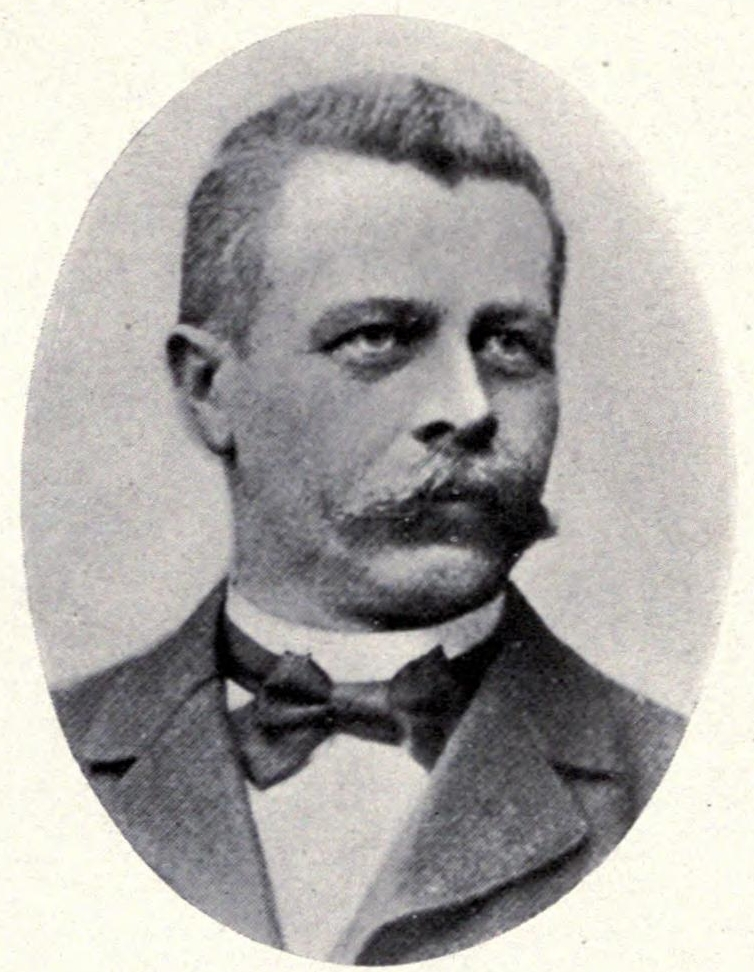

Jakob Eriksson (30 September 1848 – 26 April 1931) was a Swedish plant pathologist, mycologist and a taxonomist. Eriksson was the first to describe the special forms within morphologically similar species of rust fungi. He has over 400 publications on studies primarily focusing on fungal pathogens at the cellular level and understanding the process of infection.

== Early life and education ==
Eriksson was born in Hyllie, near Malmö, Sweden. His father Anders Eriksson was a farmer by profession. Eriksson got interested in botany when he was pursuing his high school degree in Malmö. He started collecting plants for his class project. Eriksson received his PhD from University of Lund (Sweden) in 1874 entitled “Studies over leguminosernas tubers”. Italian physician and anatomist Marcello Malpighi considered the tubers in legumes as galls. It was Eriksson who described that a fungus is responsible for the galls and therefore could be pathogenic in nature. Although now it's clear that a nitrogen fixing bacteria live in symbiosis with legumes but the work of Eriksson was valued at that time and his dissertation was published in Lund university year book and he was awarded with Zetterstedtska award.

== Positions held ==
Immediately after his PhD, he was appointed as a lecturer (docent) in botany at the university. Eriksson had a 22-year-long teaching experiences in university of Lund, university of Uppsala and New elementary school in Stockholm. In 1876 he accepted the botanist position in Academy of Agriculture. In 1885, he was appointed as a professor and director of a newly established plant physiology division. With time the division kept expanding and it was reorganized and expanded to Central Institution for experimental system in agriculture. Eriksson was the director of the center from 1907 to 1913 before his retirement.

== Research ==
Eriksson primary research interest was in diseases of crops with primary focus on mildew and parasitic fungus. The most significant finding of his research work was to describe the special forms within morphologically similar species of rust fungi. His conclusion was rust fungi are specialized and they are biologically different although they exhibit similarity in morphology. Studies of fungal plant pathogen at cellular level by Eriksson provided the better understanding of the infection process and also contributed to the plant breeding programs. Besides working on rust, Eriksson also studied a lot of other pathogens including clover rot, potato disease and fungus, fruit scab and mold, felt sick on carrot, floral and branch disease in fruit trees, spinach mildew and gooseberry mildew. Eriksson is considered to be first in writing the growers manual on fungal diseases. Eriksson published several books and monographs during his academic career and edited three exsiccatae, among them the well-known series Fungi parasitici Scandinavici exsiccati. He also travelled to different countries in Europe. He participated in several international conferences as a representative of the Swedish government. The credit for establishment of plant physiological laboratory in Erescati near Stockholm goes to him.

== Honors and awards ==
• Honorary professor (1885) • Token of gold (1897) by Academy of Agriculture • Prix DESMAZIÈRES (prize for 1897 awarded in January 1898) by Académie des Sciences in Paris • Honorary membership of landscape in Swedish and foreign academies

== Death ==
On 26 April 1931, Eriksson died in Stockholm county. He was 83.

== Jakob Eriksson Award ==
To honor Eriksson for his contribution in the field of plant pathology and mycology, the Jakob Eriksson award was established in 1923 at an International Conference of Phytopathology and Economic Entomology at Wageningen. The award was established to encourage the study on plant pathogens and understanding the processes of disease development. The award is administered by the Royal Swedish Academy of Sciences in conjunction with the International Society for Plant Pathology and consists of gold medal. The two faces of medal is embossed with Eriksson’s portrait on one side and winter and summer spores of Puccinia graminis surrounded by ears of wheat, rye and barley on the other side. As of 2018, 13 scientists have been recognized with this award.

== Selected publications ==
- Eriksson, J. 1894. "Ueber die Specialisierung des Parasitismus bei den Getreiderostpilzen" (On the specialized parasitism of the rusts of grain) in Berichte der Deutschen Botanischen Gesellschaft (Reports of the German Botanical Association) 12:9 pp. 292 – 331
- Eriksson, J. 1897. Vie latente et plasmatique de certaines Urédinées. Compt. Rend. Acad. Sci. Paris 124:475-477. (transl. Latent and plasma life of some Uredinales.)
- Eriksson, J. 1898. A general review of the principal results of Swedish research into grain rust. Bot. Gaz. 25:26-38.
- Eriksson, J. 1902. "Ueber die Specialisierung des Getreidschwarzrostes in Schweden und in anderen Ländern"(On the specialization of the black Rusts of grain in Sweden and other countries) in Centralblatt für Bakteriologie, Parasitenkunde und Infektionskrankheiten (Central paper for bacteriology, parasitology, and infectious diseases) 2:9 pp. 590 – 658
- Eriksson, J. 1910. Ueber die Mykoplasmatheorie, ihre Geschichte und ihren Tagesstand. Biol. Centr. 30:618-623. (transl. About the mycoplasm theory, its history and discussion.)
- Eriksson, J. 1912. Fungoid diseases of agricultural plants. Translated from the Swedish by Anna Molander. London: Baillière, Tindall & Cox. 208 p.
- Eriksson, J. 1913. Die Pilzkrankheiten der landwirtschaftlichen Kulturpflanzen (The fungal diseases of agriculturally cultivated plants)
- Eriksson, J. 1914. The control of plant diseases in Sweden, (International Institute. Agriculture [Rome], Monthly Bulletin Agricultural Intelligence and Plant Diseases, 5 (1914), No. 12, pp. 1546–1553).
- Eriksson, J. 1919. "Zur Entwickelungsgeschichte des Spinatschimmels (Peronospora Spinaciae (Grew.) Laub.)"(On the developmental history of the Spinach Mold (Peronospora Spinaciae (Grew.) Laub.)) in Arkiv för Botanik(Archive for Botany) 15:15 pp. 1 – 25
