= Cystofilobasidiales =

Scientific classification
- Kingdom: Fungi
- Division: Basidiomycota
- Class: Tremellomycetes
- Order: Cystofilobasidiales; Boekhout & Fell, 1999

Families
- Cystofilobasidiaceae; Mrakiaceae

Order of fungi

The Cystofilobasidiales are an order of fungi in the class Tremellomycetes of the Basidiomycota. They usually exhibit a life phase of free-living yeasts. The order contains two families with seven genera and some 25 species.
