= Basidium =

Fungal structure

Diagram showing a basidiomycete mushroom, gill structure, and spore-bearing basidia on the gill margins.

A basidium (pl.: basidia) is a microscopic spore-producing structure found on the hymenophore of reproductive bodies of basidiomycete fungi. The presence of basidia is one of the main characteristic features of the group. These bodies are also called tertiary mycelia, which are highly coiled versions of secondary mycelia. A basidium usually bears four sexual spores called basidiospores. Occasionally the number may be two or even eight. Each reproductive spore is produced at the tip of a narrow prong or horn called a sterigma (pl. sterigmata), and is forcefully expelled at full growth.

The word basidium literally means "little pedestal". This is the way the basidium supports the spores. However, some biologists suggest that the structure looks more like a club. A partially grown basidium is known as a basidiole.

== Structure ==
Most basidiomycota have single celled basidia (holobasidia), but some have ones with many cells (a phragmobasidia). For instance, rust fungi in the order Puccinales have phragmobasidia with four cells that are separated by walls along their cross section. Some jelly fungi in the order Tremellales also have phragmobasidia with four cells that are separated by walls and are shaped like a cross. Sometimes the basidium develops from a probasidium, which is not elongated like a typical hypha. The basidium may be stalked or attached directly to the hyphae.

The basidium is normally club-shaped: narrow at the stem and wide near its outer end. It is widest in the middle hemispherical dome at its apex, and its base is about half the size of the widest diameter at the highest point. Basidia with a short and narrow base are shaped like an inverted egg, and occur in genera such as Paullicorticium, Oliveonia, and Tulasnella. Basidia with a wide base are often shaped like a barrel.

== How basidiospores are expelled ==
In most basidiomycota, the basidiospores are forcibly expelled. The propulsive force is derived from a sudden change in the center of gravity of the discharged spore. Important factors in forcible discharge include Buller's drop, a drop of fluid that builds up at the nearer tip (hilar appendage) of each basidiospore; the offset attachment of the spore to the extending narrow prong, and the presence of hygroscopic regions on the basidiospore surface. Basidiospore discharge can only succeed after sufficient water vapor has condensed on the spore.

When a basidiospore matures, sugars present in the cell wall begin to serve as condensation loci for water vapour in the air. Two separate regions of condensation are critical. At the pointed tip of the spore (the hilum) closest to the supporting basidium, Buller's drop builds up as a large, almost spherical water droplet.

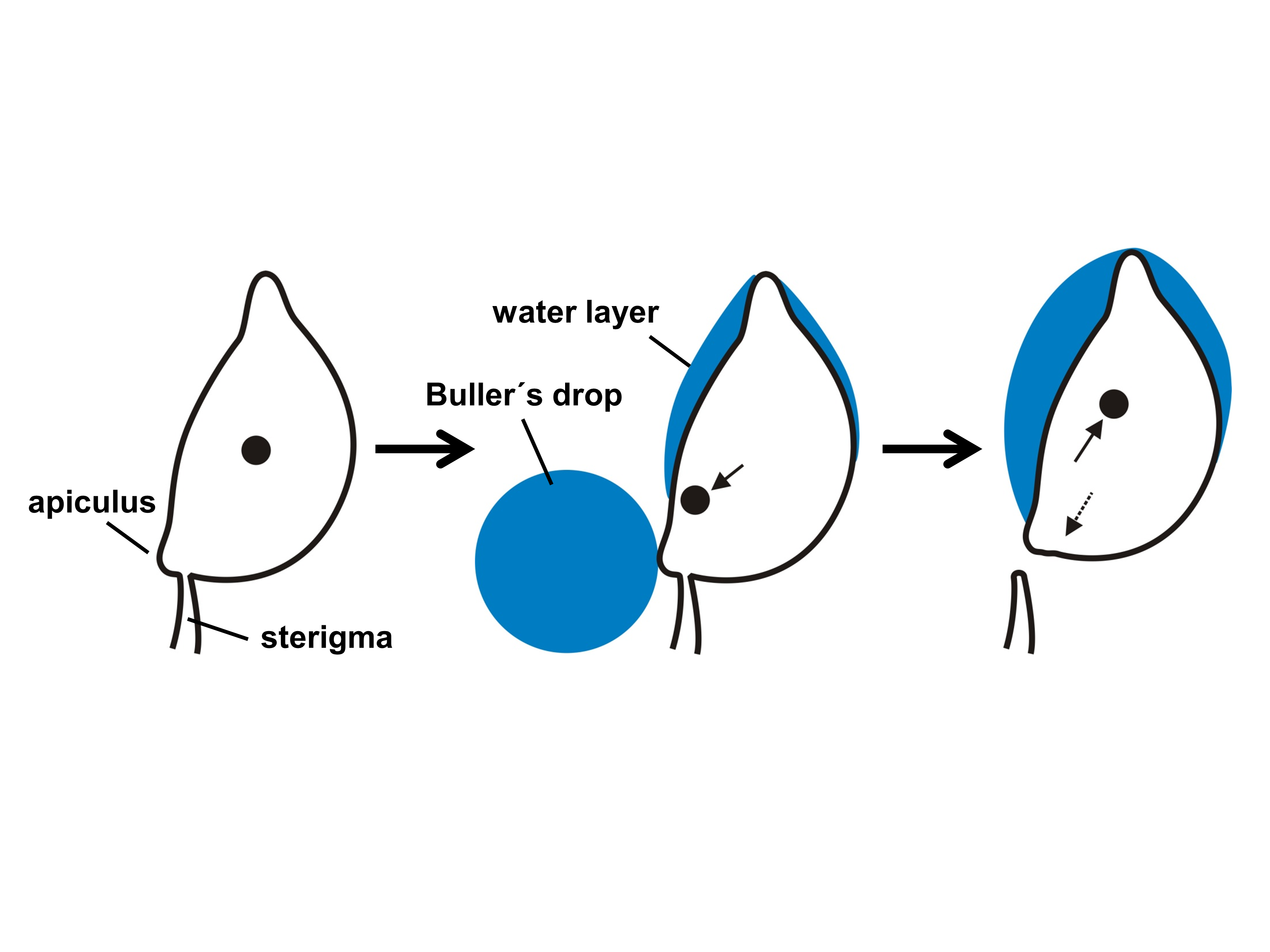

At the same time, condensation occurs in a thin film on the stalk-facing part of the spore. When these two bodies of water combine, the release of surface tension and the sudden change in the center of gravity suddenly expels the basidiospore. Remarkably, the initial acceleration of the spore is estimated to be about 10,000 g.

=== Evolutionary loss of expulsion by force ===
Some basidiomycetes do not have a means to forcibly expel their basidiospores, although they still form them. In each of these groups, spore dispersal occurs through other means of expulsion.

For example:

- Members of the order Phallales (stinkhorns) rely on insect vectors for dispersal.
- The dry spores of the Lycoperdales (puffballs) and Sclerodermataceae (earth balls and kin) are dispersed when the basidiocarps are disturbed.
- Species of the Nidulariales (bird's nest fungi) use a splash cup mechanism.

In these cases the basidiospore typically lacks a hilar appendage, and expulsion by force does not occur. Each example is thought to represent an independent evolutionary loss of the forcible discharge that comes before all basidiomycetes.
