= Sulzbacheromyces chocoensis =

Scientific classification
- Kingdom: Fungi
- Division: Basidiomycota
- Class: Agaricomycetes
- Order: Lepidostromatales
- Family: Lepidostromataceae
- Genus: Sulzbacheromyces
- Species: S. chocoensis

Binomial name
- Sulzbacheromyces chocoensis Coca, Lücking & B.Moncada (2018)

Species of lichen

Sulzbacheromyces chocoensis is a species of soil-dwelling basidiolichen in the family Lepidostromataceae. It forms a thin, olive-green crust on clay soil and produces distinctive unbranched, reddish-orange to yellowish reproductive structures. The species was described in 2018 from specimens collected in Colombia's Chocó Biogeographic Region, where it grows in tropical rainforest environments.

== Taxonomy ==
Sulzbacheromyces chocoensis was formally described as a new species in 2018 by the lichenologists Luis Fernando Coca, Robert Lücking, and Bibiana Moncada. The holotype specimen (Coca et al. 5821) was collected on 3 May 2014 and is housed in the Herbario Universidad de Caldas (FAUC), with an isotype deposited at the Berlin Botanical Garden and Botanical Museum (B). The specific epithet chocoensis refers to the Chocó Biogeographic Region where the species was discovered.

Molecular phylogenetics analysis based on the nuclear ribosomal internal transcribed spacer (ITS) region shows that S. chocoensis belongs to a well-supported Neotropical clade within the genus Sulzbacheromyces, alongside S. tutunendo and S. caatingae. These three species form a distinct lineage from their Asian and African relatives, such as S. sinensis and S. miomboensis.

== Description ==
The lichen forms a crust-like (crustose) thallus that grows on soil. The thallus is olive green in colour and relatively thin, measuring between 19 and 58 micrometres (μm) in thickness. It has a compact, uniform structure throughout. The photobiont (the algal partner in the symbiotic relationship) consists of chlorococcoid cells that are either continuous or grouped together, with individual cells measuring 3–6 by 6–11 μm.

Its most distinctive features are the reproductive structures (basidiomata), which appear as reddish-orange to yellowish projections that remain unbranched. These structures measure 4–10 mm in height and 1–2 mm in diameter. A distinctive characteristic is their white base or 'stipe', which measures 0.4–0.6 mm in height. The basidiomata have a spindle-shaped (fusiform) to club-like (clavate) shape and taper to a point at their tips.

== Habitat and distribution ==
Sulzbacheromyces chocoensis has only been found in its type locality within the Chocó Biogeographic Region of Colombia, specifically near the village of Tutunendo. Unlike its close relative S. tutunendo, which can grow on various substrates, S. chocoensis is strictly terricolous, meaning it grows exclusively on clay soil. The species is found in tropical rainforest environments, where it forms colonies on the forest floor. It is considered sympatric with S. tutunendo, meaning both species occur in the same geographical area, though they occupy slightly different ecological niches due to their substrate preferences.
