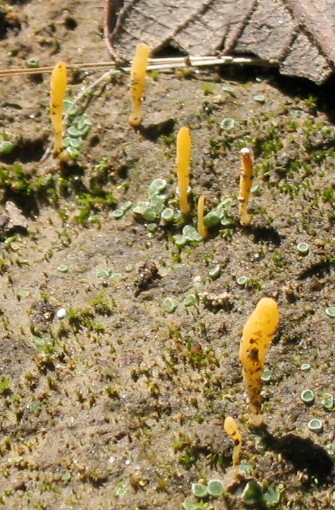
- The type collection, photographed in the field in 2007

Scientific classification
- Kingdom: Fungi
- Division: Basidiomycota
- Class: Agaricomycetes
- Order: Lepidostromatales
- Family: Lepidostromataceae
- Genus: Lepidostroma
- Species: L. vilgalysii

Binomial name
- Lepidostroma vilgalysii B.P.Hodk. (2012)
- Holotype: San José Teacalco, Tlaxcala, Mexico

= Lepidostroma vilgalysii =

Species of lichen

Lepidostroma vilgalysii is a species of basidiolichen in the family Lepidostromataceae. Discovered in 2012 in Mexico's Trans-Mexican Volcanic Belt, it grows in small green patches on clay banks in high-altitude pine forests. The species is distinctive because of its unusual "window lichen" structure, where its algal partner is concentrated in a layer at the base rather than near the surface as in most lichens. Its most distinctive features are its club-shaped reproductive structures, which are pale yellow to orange-brown with cream-colored tips, and its scale-like body parts that have white, raised edges. It is known only from a single location near San José Teacalco, Tlaxcala, at an elevation of about 3,000 m (9,800 ft) above sea level.

== Taxonomy ==
Lepidostroma vilgalysii was first named and described in 2012 by Brendan Hodkinson, Jessie Uehling, and Matthew Smith. The species was discovered in Mexico's Trans-Mexican Volcanic Belt and represents only the second member of the family Lepidostromataceae documented from the New World. The holotype specimen (RV-MX16) was collected by the mycologist Rytas Vilgalys, after whom the species is named. The species was first effectively published on January 4, 2012, in the "Online-First" edition of Mycological Progress, making it among the earlier species descriptions to be published electronically under the then-new provisions for electronic publication in taxonomy.

Since the species' discovery, significant taxonomic changes have occurred in the group. In 2014, the order Lepidostromatales was established to contain the family Lepidostromataceae, reflecting the distinct evolutionary lineage of these fungi. The traditionally broad genus Lepidostroma was split into three genera – Lepidostroma in the strict sense (which includes L. vilgalysii), Ertzia, and Sulzbacheromyces – based on both morphological features and phylogenetic evidence. Analysis of the nuclear ribosomal LSU region confirms the species' placement within Lepidostroma while demonstrating its genetic distinctness from other members of the genus, with L. calocerum and L. rugaramae as its closest known relatives

== Description ==
Lepidostroma vilgalysii is a basidiolichen, a rare type of lichen formed by a fungal partner (mycobiont) from the division Basidiomycota rather than the more common Ascomycota. It grows in distinctive patches that are dark to light green in color, never joining but remaining as separate rounded areas measuring 1.5–2.5 mm (occasionally up to 3.0 mm) in diameter. These patches thicken to 0.2–0.5 mm and become more expanded when wet, hardening when dry.

The lichen's body (thallus) forms small scale-like structures called squamules that are concave in shape. When young, these squamules have a distinctive white, raised, and somewhat swollen edge, though this becomes less noticeable as they mature. The upper surface shows a pattern of lighter-colored spots (maculae) against the green background. Below the surface, thread-like fungal structures called rhizohyphae extend 1–4 mm beneath the squamules, helping to anchor the lichen.

The reproductive structures (basidiocarps) are club-shaped and delicate, measuring 0.5–1.2 cm in length and 0.3–0.6 mm in thickness (occasionally up to 1.0 mm). They display a distinctive color pattern: pale yellow to rusty orange-brown, with the bottom half typically lighter, the top half darker, and a characteristic pale cream-colored tip when mature. When dry, these structures show several distinct irregular lengthwise grooves.

One of the most characteristic features of L. vilgalysii is its inverted structure, where the algal partner (photobiont) forms a dense layer at the base of the thallus rather than near the top as in most lichens. The photobiont consists of green algal cells that are mostly ellipsoid in shape, measuring 8–13 by 5–8 micrometers (μm), each containing a central or near-central pyrenoid (a protein-containing body involved in carbon fixation). These algal cells form columns that project upward through the fungal tissue, creating the spotted pattern visible on the surface.

The fungal tissue itself comprises multiple layers: an upper cortex made of 1–3 layers of polygonal cells, a loose middle layer (medulla) 0.15–0.40 mm thick containing sparsely branched fungal threads, and a lower cortex with multiple cell layers from which the anchoring rhizohyphae extend. The reproductive spores (basidiospores) produced by the basidiocarps are elongated-oval in shape, thin-walled, clear, and measure 11–14 by 4–6.5 μm.

=== Similar species ===
Lepidostroma vilgalysii is morphologically most similar to the central African species Lepidostroma rugaramae, sharing features such as white-rimmed squamules with conspicuous maculae. However, L. vilgalysii can be distinguished by several characteristics:

- Yellow to orange-brown basidiocarps (fruiting bodies) lacking the reddish tinge found in L. rugaramae
- Distinctive cream-colored apices on the basidiocarps, particularly visible when dry
- More elongate spores
- Polygonal upper cortex cells that often occur in multiple layers (versus the jigsaw-like, single-layered cells in L. rugaramae)

== Habitat, distribution, and ecology ==
Lepidostroma vilgalysii is known only from a single location in the Trans-Mexican Volcanic Belt, in the Mexican state of Tlaxcala. There, it grows on a clay embankment at an elevation of 3,015 m (9,892 ft) above sea level. The species' habitat consists of forested areas dominated by Pinus montezumae (Montezuma pine) with the presence of Alnus acuminata (Andean alder). This high-altitude environment is characteristic of the Trans-Mexican Volcanic Belt's montane ecosystems.

The species exhibits an unusual "window lichen" morphology shared with other members of the genus Lepidostroma. While this inverted structure is typically interpreted as an adaptation to dry conditions in other lichen species, researchers note that this explanation may not fully account for its presence in L. vilgalysii and its close relative L. calocerum, suggesting other ecological factors may be involved. The species is believed to share its geographic range with L. calocerum, the only other Lepidostroma species known from the New World, though additional specimens and locations have yet to be documented.

Within the broader context of Lepidostromatales diversity, L. vilgalysii represents one of several species documented from the Americas. Other New World species include congeners from Colombia and Costa Rica, as well as Brazilian representatives from different genera within the order. The species' restriction to a single locality contrasts with the broader distribution patterns seen in the order Lepidostromatales, which has centers of diversity in Africa (particularly Central Africa) and Asia, where multiple species often occur in sympatry. The species appears to share habitat preferences with some of its relatives, favoring clay soils in exposed, seasonally moist environments. The presence of abundant rhizohyphae extending into the substrate suggests an adaptation for secure attachment to its clay bank habitat.
