= Sulzbacheromyces leucodontius =

Scientific classification
- Kingdom: Fungi
- Division: Basidiomycota
- Class: Agaricomycetes
- Order: Lepidostromatales
- Family: Lepidostromataceae
- Genus: Sulzbacheromyces
- Species: S. leucodontius

Binomial name
- Sulzbacheromyces leucodontius Coca, Gómez-Gómez, Guzmán-Guillermo & Dal Forno (2023)

Species of lichen

Sulzbacheromyces leucodontius is a species of basidiolichen in the family Lepidostromataceae. First described in 2023, it is characterised by its distinctive white, unbranched fruiting bodies that resemble elephant tusks, growing 6–25 millimetres tall. The species forms a thin, crusty growth on clay soils in tropical rainforests, where it lives in symbiosis with microscopic green algae. It has the broadest geographical distribution of any American Sulzbacheromyces species, occurring across the Neotropics from Mexico to western Brazil, particularly in lowland areas. Although initially published as S. leucodontium, the species name was later corrected to S. leucodontius.

== Taxonomy ==
Sulzbacheromyces leucodontius was described as a new species in 2023 by Luis Coca, Salomé Gómez-Gómez, Jorge Guzmán-Guillermo, and Manuela Dal Forno. The species name leucodontius refers to its white fruiting bodies that resemble elephant tusks in shape. Although the name was originally published as leucodontium, it was later corrected to leucodontius. It is distinctive within its genus for having pure white fruiting bodies that do not branch, and for lacking specialised fungal connections (clamp connections in its cellular structure. While it superficially resembles Multiclavula mucida, another white basidiolichen species found in the same regions, S. leucodontius can be distinguished by its preference for growing on soil rather than rotting wood. The unbranched basidia help to distinguish it from other members of its genus.

== Description ==
The organism consists of a thin, crusty layer (called a thallus) that grows on clay soil. This layer contains its algal partners—microscopic green algae of the Trebouxioid type, which live surrounded by fungal threads (hyphae). The most noticeable features are its white to ivory-coloured fruiting bodies that grow upright from the surface. These structures are typically 10–20 millimetres tall (though can range from 6–25 mm) and are shaped like small clubs or spindles, being wider at the base and tapering towards the tip. Under the microscope, these fruiting bodies contain reproductive cells called basidia, which produce spores that are elliptical in shape and transparent.

== Habitat and distribution ==
Sulzbacheromyces leucodontius has the widest geographical range of any American Sulzbacheromyces species, being found across tropical regions from Mexico to western Brazil. It specifically grows on orange clay soil in tropical rainforests, particularly in lowland and sub-lowland areas. Specific locations include the Andean-Amazon Piedmont region of Colombia (in the departments of Caquetá and Putumayo), areas near Pico de Orizaba in Mexico, and sustainable forest reserves in Brazil's Amazon rainforest. Unlike some related species which are known only from single locations, S. leucodontius has adapted to grow across a broad geographical area while maintaining specific habitat preferences for soil type and forest conditions.
