= Sulzbacheromyces yunnanensis =

Scientific classification
- Domain: Eukaryota
- Kingdom: Fungi
- Division: Basidiomycota
- Class: Agaricomycetes
- Order: Lepidostromatales
- Family: Lepidostromataceae
- Genus: Sulzbacheromyces
- Species: S. yunnanensis

Binomial name
- Sulzbacheromyces yunnanensis D.Liu, Li S.Wang & Goffinet (2017)

Species of lichen

Sulzbacheromyces yunnanensis is a species of basidiolichen in the family Lepidostromataceae. It is found in Yunnan, China.

== Taxonomy ==
The lichen was described as a new species in 2017 by Dong Liu, Lisong Wang, and Bernard Goffinet. It is most closely related to S. bicolor and S. fossicolus, but can be distinguished from these relatives by its yellow to orange colouration rather than whitish fruiting bodies. While similar to S. sinensis, it lacks the silvery coating (prothallus) characteristic of that species and has distinctive grooves along its fruiting bodies.

== Description ==
The organism forms a thin, crusty layer covering areas between 5 cm and 3 m in diameter. This crust appears dark green in shaded areas but becomes yellow-green or light yellow and difficult to distinguish from soil in exposed locations. It contains clusters of single-celled green algae surrounded by transparent fungal threads (hyphae). The most noticeable features are its upright fruiting bodies, which reach 0.3–6.5 cm in height. These structures are unique among its relatives for having two distinct lengthwise grooves. They vary considerably in shape, sometimes appearing club-like, cylindrical, spiral, or even T-shaped. The fruiting bodies are yellow or light orange when exposed to rain and direct sunlight, becoming orange in shade, with a darker ochre base. While tasteless, they produce a strong mushroom-like odour.

== Habitat and distribution ==
Sulzbacheromyces yunnanensis appears to be endemic to China's Yunnan Province, where it grows on exposed, moist red and yellow clay or sandy soil. It is particularly common in Pu'er tea gardens and along bare roadsides. The species has been observed being eaten by a beetle, Mylabris cichorii, known for producing compounds with potential anti-cancer properties. Spores and fungal fragments have been found in the beetle's droppings, suggesting the insect might play a role in dispersing the lichen, though this relationship requires further study.
