= Sulzbacheromyces tutunendo =

Scientific classification
- Domain: Eukaryota
- Kingdom: Fungi
- Division: Basidiomycota
- Class: Agaricomycetes
- Order: Lepidostromatales
- Family: Lepidostromataceae
- Genus: Sulzbacheromyces
- Species: S. tutunendo

Binomial name
- Sulzbacheromyces tutunendo Coca, Lücking & B.Moncada (2018)

Species of lichen

Sulzbacheromyces tutunendo is a species of basidiolichen in the family Lepidostromataceae. It is found in Colombia.

== Taxonomy ==
Sulzbacheromyces tutunendo was formally described as new to science in 2018 by Luis Coca, Robert Lücking, and Bibiana Moncada. The species name tutunendo refers to its type locality, the village of Tutunendo near Quibdó, Colombia. The name derives from an Embera word meaning "river of aromas". It is closely related to but genetically distinct from S. chocoensis, which occurs in the same region.

== Description ==
The lichen forms a crustose (crust-like) thallus that grows on soil and rotting wood. The thallus is olive green in colour and measures 20–60 μm thick. It has a distinctive thick outer layer of fungal threads (hyphae) that forms a "cortex", with air pockets inside the structure. The photobiont (the algal partner) consists of rounded to ellipsoid chlorococcoid cells grouped together, measuring 5–9 by 9–11 μm.

The most distinctive features are its reproductive structures called basidiomata, which are orange to yellowish-orange, cylindrical to slightly spindle-shaped projections that often branch above their middle section. These structures measure 6–15 mm in height and 1–2 mm in diameter, typically ending in curled tips.

== Habitat and distribution ==
Sulzbacheromyces tutunendo has thus far only been found in the Chocó Biogeographic Region of Colombia, specifically near the village of Tutunendo. It grows in tropical rainforest environments, where it can be found on both soil and rotting wood substrates, sometimes occurring on mixed substrates. Unlike its close relative S. chocoensis, which is found exclusively on soil, S. tutunendo shows more flexibility in its habitat preferences. The species is considered sympatric with S. chocoensis, meaning both species occur in the same geographical area.
