= Sulzbacheromyces miomboensis =

Scientific classification
- Domain: Eukaryota
- Kingdom: Fungi
- Division: Basidiomycota
- Class: Agaricomycetes
- Order: Lepidostromatales
- Family: Lepidostromataceae
- Genus: Sulzbacheromyces
- Species: S. miomboensis

Binomial name
- Sulzbacheromyces miomboensis De Kesel & Ertz (2017)

Species of lichen

Sulzbacheromyces miomboensis is a species of basidiolichen in the family Lepidostromataceae. Found in the Democratic Republic of the Congo, as was described as new to science in 2017.

== Taxonomy ==
The lichen was described as a new species in 2017 by André De Kesel and Damien Ertz, from specimens collected in the Democratic Republic of the Congo (DRC). The specific epithet miomboensis refers to the miombo forests where the species was discovered. This species represents the first record of the genus Sulzbacheromyces from Africa. It is most closely related to S. caatingae from South America, though they differ in several microscopic features. While S. caatingae occasionally has specialised fungal connections called clamp connections, these are consistently absent in S. miomboensis. Additionally, S. miomboensis produces larger spores. Unlike other African basidiolichens such as Ertzia akagerae and Lepidostroma rugaramae, which have scale-like growths, S. miomboensis forms a simple crust.

== Description ==
The organism forms a thin, barely noticeable crust containing single-celled green algae that have multiple chloroplasts and a large oil-containing body. Its most distinctive features are the upright fruiting bodies, which are club-shaped—narrow at the base and widening towards the tip. These structures reach 2–4.2 cm in height and are deep orange to reddish-orange in colour, except for their whitish-orange base. When dried, they become pale orange or orange-white, often with a pinkish tinge. The fruiting bodies have shallow lengthwise grooves and are hollow when mature. Under the microscope, they show a complex internal structure of fungal threads (hyphae) arranged in distinct layers, producing transparent, elongated spores.

== Habitat and distribution ==
Sulzbacheromyces miomboensis is currently known only from the Haut-Katanga Province of the DRC, where it is common in its preferred habitat. The species appears in areas with a strongly seasonal climate, characterised by a dry season from May to September/October and a rainy season from November to April, during which rainfall averages 1,240 mm per year. The fruiting bodies emerge halfway through the rainy season, growing on compacted, iron-rich soil, often along dirt roads. These sites are typically very exposed to sun, hot, and have little other vegetation. When conditions are suitable, hundreds of fruiting bodies can appear together, covering several square metres.
