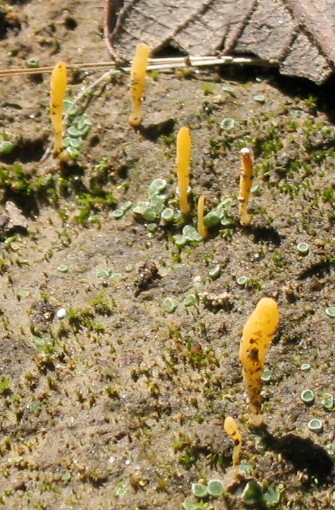
- Lepidostroma vilgalysii

Scientific classification
- Kingdom: Fungi
- Division: Basidiomycota
- Class: Agaricomycetes
- Order: Lepidostromatales
- Family: Lepidostromataceae
- Genus: Lepidostroma; Magd. & S.Winkl. (1967)

Species
- L. calocerum L. rugaramae L. vilgalysii L. winklerianum

= Lepidostroma =

Genus of fungi

Lepidostroma is a genus in the family Lepidostromataceae (the only family within the fungal order Lepidostromatales). The genus is distinguished from all other lichenized clavarioid fungi (Multiclavula (Cantharellales), Ertzia (Lepidostromatales), and Sulzbacheromyces (Lepidostromatales)) by having a distinctly squamulose thallus (similar to a 'Coriscium-type' thallus) with scattered to dense rounded to reniform squamules. Four species are known from the tropics of Africa and the Americas.

== Species ==
- Lepidostroma calocerum (G.W.Martin) Oberw. (1984)
- Lepidostroma rugaramae (Eb.Fisch., Ertz, Killmann & Sérus.) Ertz, Eb.Fisch., Killmann, Sérus. & Lawrey (2008)
- Lepidostroma vilgalysii B.P.Hodk. (2012)
- Lepidostroma winklerianum B.P.Hodk. & Lücking (2013)

The taxon Lepidostroma asianum Yanaga & N.Maek. (2014), described from Japan, is considered synonymous with the Asian species Sulzbacheromyces sinensis. Other species once classified in this genus have since been transferred to other genera, including:

- Lepidostroma akagerae (Eb.Fisch., Ertz, Killmann & Sérus.) Ertz, Eb.Fisch., Killmann, Sérus. & Lawrey (2008) is now Ertzia akagerae
- Lepidostroma caatingae Sulzbacher & Lücking (2012) is now Sulzbacheromyces caatingae.
