= Sulzbacheromyces bicolor =

Scientific classification
- Domain: Eukaryota
- Kingdom: Fungi
- Division: Basidiomycota
- Class: Agaricomycetes
- Order: Lepidostromatales
- Family: Lepidostromataceae
- Genus: Sulzbacheromyces
- Species: S. bicolor

Binomial name
- Sulzbacheromyces bicolor D.Liu, Li S.Wang & Goffinet (2017)

Species of lichen

Sulzbacheromyces bicolor is a species of basidiolichen in the family Lepidostromataceae. It occurs in Yunnan, China.

== Taxonomy ==
Sulzbacheromyces bicolor was formally described as a new species in 2017 by Dong Liu, Li-Song Wang, and Bernard Goffinet. It is most closely related to S. fossicolus, from which it can be distinguished by its two-toned colouration and the presence of a silvery-white coating (called a prothallus) on its crust-like body. The species also has specialised fungal connections called clamp connections in its cellular structure, which S. fossicolus lacks.

Molecular phylogenetics analysis has shown that Sulzbacheromyces bicolor forms a clade with other Asian species of Sulzbacheromyces, including S. fossicolus, and S. sinensis, and S. yunnanensis.

== Description ==
The organism consists of a thin, crusty layer (thallus) that grows on soil and rocks, covering areas of 5–40 cm in diameter. This layer appears green to dark green and contains clusters of single-celled green algae that live in partnership with the fungus. A distinctive silvery-white or grey coating (prothallus) covers parts of the crust. The most noticeable features are its upright fruiting bodies, which are club-shaped or cylindrical and occasionally branched. These structures are 3–23 mm tall and 0.3–1 mm wide, with a pale yellow colouration at the tip that transitions to white at the base. Under the microscope, the fungal threads (hyphae) show distinctive swellings and contain oil droplets, and the reproductive cells produce elliptical, transparent spores.

== Habitat and distribution ==
Sulzbacheromyces bicolor is known to occur only in two locations in southwestern Yunnan Province, China, where it grows on exposed red soil and rocks. It appears to prefer areas that receive some seasonal moisture but are generally exposed to light.
