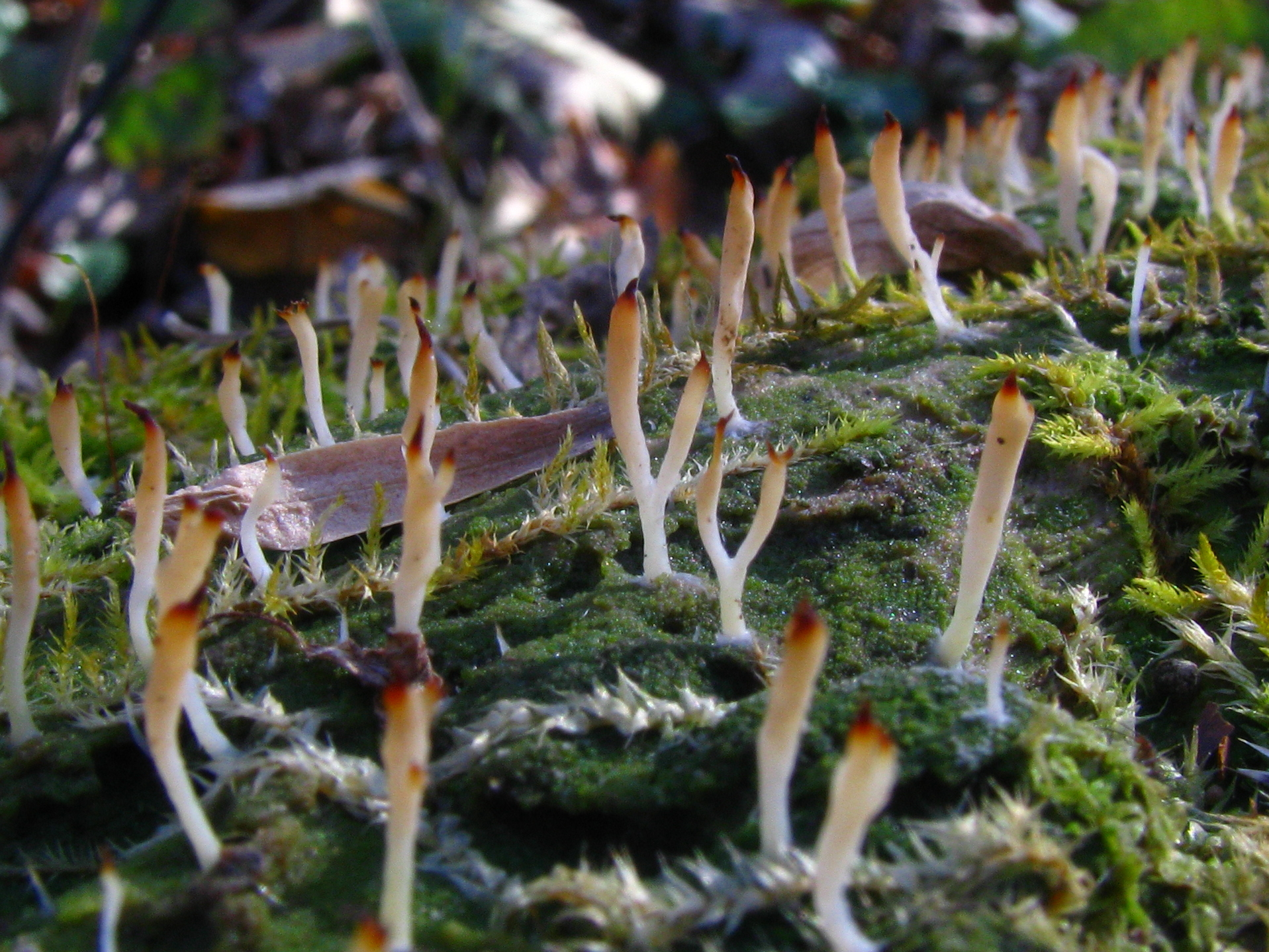

Scientific classification
- Kingdom: Fungi
- Division: Basidiomycota
- Class: Agaricomycetes
- Order: Cantharellales
- Family: Hydnaceae
- Genus: Multiclavula
- Species: M. mucida

Binomial name
- Multiclavula mucida (Pers.) R.H.Petersen (1967)

Synonyms
- List: Clavaria mucida Pers. (1797); Typhula mucida (Pers.) Fr. (1827); Calocera mucida (Pers.) Wettst. (1886); Pistillaria mucida (Pers.) Costantin & L.M.Dufour (1891); Lentaria mucida (Pers.) Corner (1950); Stichoclavaria mucida (Pers.) Paechn. (1987); Clavaria mucida var. rosea Bres. (1916); Lentaria mucida var. hexaspora Geitler (1965)

= Multiclavula mucida =

Species of lichen

Multiclavula mucida is a globally distributed species of basidiolichen belonging to the family Hydnaceae. Since its initial classification by Christiaan Hendrik Persoon in 1797, the species has been described under various synonyms and associated with multiple genera. Persoon described its fruiting bodies as gregarious (i.e. growing in groups but separate at the base), varying from simple to branching structures, predominantly whitish in colour with yellow to brownish tips. He also noted its frequent appearance in autumn on decaying, moist wood, often covered with a greenish crust necessary for its growth.

The cosmopolitan distribution of Multiclavula mucida and its variability in appearance have led to a complex nomenclature and historical confusion with other species and genera. Though widespread, it is considered rare in Europe and faces threats in many countries. It can be distinguished from similar species such as Multiclavula petricola, M. vernalis, M. coronilla, and the genus Clavicorona by differences in basidiospore size, growth substrate, fruiting body structure, and microscopic features, despite similarities in colour and general form.

== Systematics ==
=== Historical taxonomy ===
The fungus was first formally described by Christiaan Hendrik Persoon in 1797, as Clavaria mucida. Persoon characterised the fungus as gregarious, small, and either simple or branching. He noted its autumnal appearance on decaying, moist tree trunks covered with a crust or green powder, sometimes extending over a wide area. He described each specimen of the species as small and slender, occurring in both simple and more frequently in branched forms. The initial growth stage is marked by a thickened, wrinkled, and slightly curved apex. In branched specimens, the structure divides into thin, diverging, sharp branches originating from the middle or base. Persoon described the flesh as fleshy but not very tenacious, primarily whitish with the tip of the fungus being more intensely ochre in simpler forms, growing on a thin, whitish substrate or tomentum. He questioned the unique nature of the greenish crust common to this species, noting that it seemed necessary for its growth but disappeared when dried. Additionally, Persoon considered whether what he considered related species, Ramaria ornithopodoides and Clavaria albida, due to their significant size and branching nature, should be classified together with Clavaria mucida or recognised as distinct species.

The fungus has acquired several synonyms as a result of having been transferred to different genera in its taxonomic history. After its initial placement in Clavaria, it has been proposed for transfer to Typhula (by Elias Fries in 1827), Calocera (Richard Wettstein, 1886), Pistillaria (Julien Noël Costantin and Léon Marie Dufour, 1891), Lentaria (E. J. H. Corner, 1950), and Stichoclavaria (Eckehard Paechnatz, 1987). American mycologist Ron Petersen, in a 1967 publication transferred the taxon to the newly circumscribed genus Multiclavula in 1967. Before Corner's 1950 monograph on clavarioid fungi, little attention was given to hyphal structure and morphology in their taxonomy. Despite Corner's extensive literature compilation, he couldn't inspect many type specimens, leading to reliance on past reports for species reclassification. During Petersen's study of Clavulinopsis and comparing it to species in Lentaria's subgenus Lentariopsis as defined by Corner, it became clear that several species across both genera could be congeneric. Corner himself was uncertain about the internal relationships within Lentaria, particularly about the evolutionary connections between its species and those in the Ramaria stricta series. This ambiguity led Petersen to reevaluate the genera housing these fungi.

=== Current classification ===
The reclassification of Multiclavula mucida was influenced by comparative analyses with other genera of lichen-forming fungi. While Clavulinopsis species are mostly terrestrial, characterised by white, thin- to slightly thick-walled spores and monomitic hyphae (a type of fungal tissue composed of uniformly structured hyphae), M. mucida has distinctive traits. Similarly, Lentaria, particularly exemplified by L. surculus, contrasts with M. mucida due to its predominantly lignicolous nature and thicker-walled hyphae. Despite these differences, the species within Lentaria have been subdivided into two distinct groups, neither of which aligns with Corner's subgenera, which indicated the necessity for a new genus classification.

This reevaluation, spurred by inconsistencies and the unique characteristics of the C. mucida group, led to significant taxonomic revisions. Historical classifications that placed C. mucida within various genera were reexamined. Petersen's review of relevant type specimens, particularly those related to Lentariopsis, concluded that the subgenus should be amalgamated with Lentaria. This consolidation and the unique aspects of C. mucida facilitated the establishment of Multiclavula as a distinct genus, addressing both phylogenetic and morphological disparities.

=== Etymology and vernacular names ===
The species epithet mucida is from the Latin word mucidum, meaning "mouldy" or "slimy"; the genus name Multiclavula means "many clubs". In North American literature, this fungus is known by several vernacular names, including "scum lover", "common club mushroom lichen", "frail bones", and "club lichen", the last of which is also used to refer to the entire genus.

== Description ==
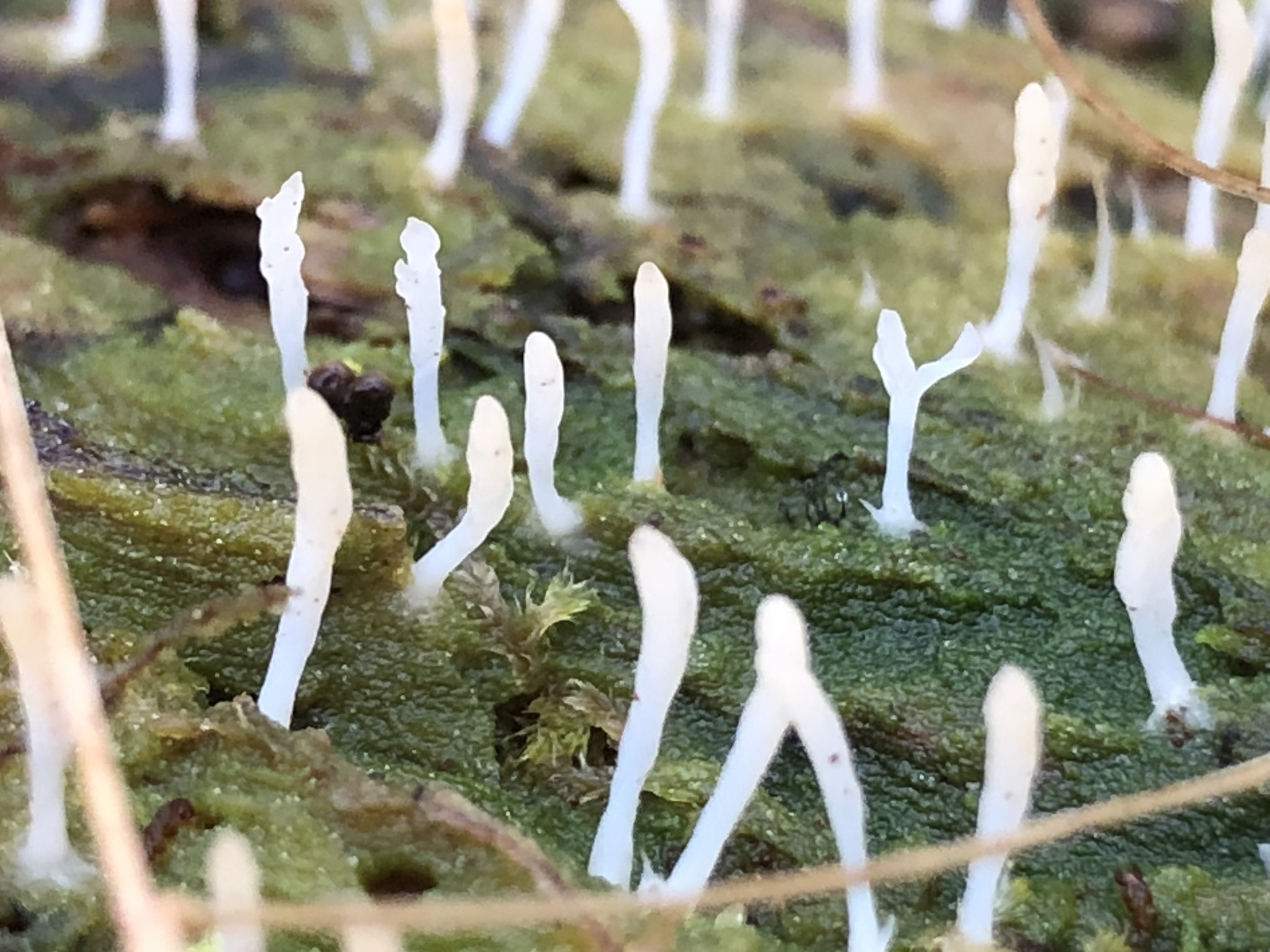
The thallus appears as a green, gelatinous film with rounded to flattened structures that contain coccomyxoid algae.

In the thallus of M. mucida, the algae are not merely scattered. Instead, they are organised into small, closely situated globules embedded in a gelatinous matrix on moist, rotting wood. This Botrydina-type thallus structure, common in basidiolichens, serves multiple functions. It protects the algae from UV light and desiccation, while ensuring close contact through a hyphal network that provides a continuous water and minerals supply. The fruiting bodies (basidiocarps) are typically simple to lobed and can reach up to 2 cm (0.8 in) in height. They are waxy-tough but can become slimy, transitioning from white or creamy colour to grey or pale tan as they mature. These structures often dry to show a pure white tip. The fruiting bodies' stickiness often causes debris to adhere to their surfaces. The algal partners are encapsulated in tiny pockets of fungal tissue, yet they retain a loose, unstructured form, manifesting as a green granular crust where the fungus produces its fruiting bodies. Despite their mutualistic relationship, both the algae and the fungus maintain their individual morphology. The relationship between coccomyxoid green algae and M. mucida was documented by Geitler in 1955, noting that the algae are larger within the lichen than when free-living. He suggested in 1956 that this size difference could be due to a decrease in algal division frequency induced by the fungal partner, the mycobiont. Using electron microscopy, Hiroshi Masumoto identified the photobiont partner of M. mucida as Elliptochloris subsphaerica.

The fungus's internal structure features thin to slightly thick-walled hyphae. These threads are generally parallel, interlocking, and often merged, showing many branching and connecting points (anastomoses). These hyphae also feature clamp connections, which are small bridge-like structures connecting the cells, and can be up to 200 μm long.

Below the surface layer, thinner, more twisted hyphae form the basidia as side branches. Basidia are typically short and narrow, with four to six outgrowths (sterigmata) from which spores are released. They measure 15–25 by 4–6 μm. The spores themselves are ovoid to ellipsoid, smooth, and can contain one or two oil droplets (guttulate), appearing white in spore prints and measuring 4.5–7.7 by 1.8–3.2 μm. M. mucida does not react with any of the standard chemical spot tests and is not known to contain any secondary metabolites (lichen products).

David Arora describes the edibility of these tiny and temporary fruit bodies as "utterly inconsequential".

=== Similar species ===
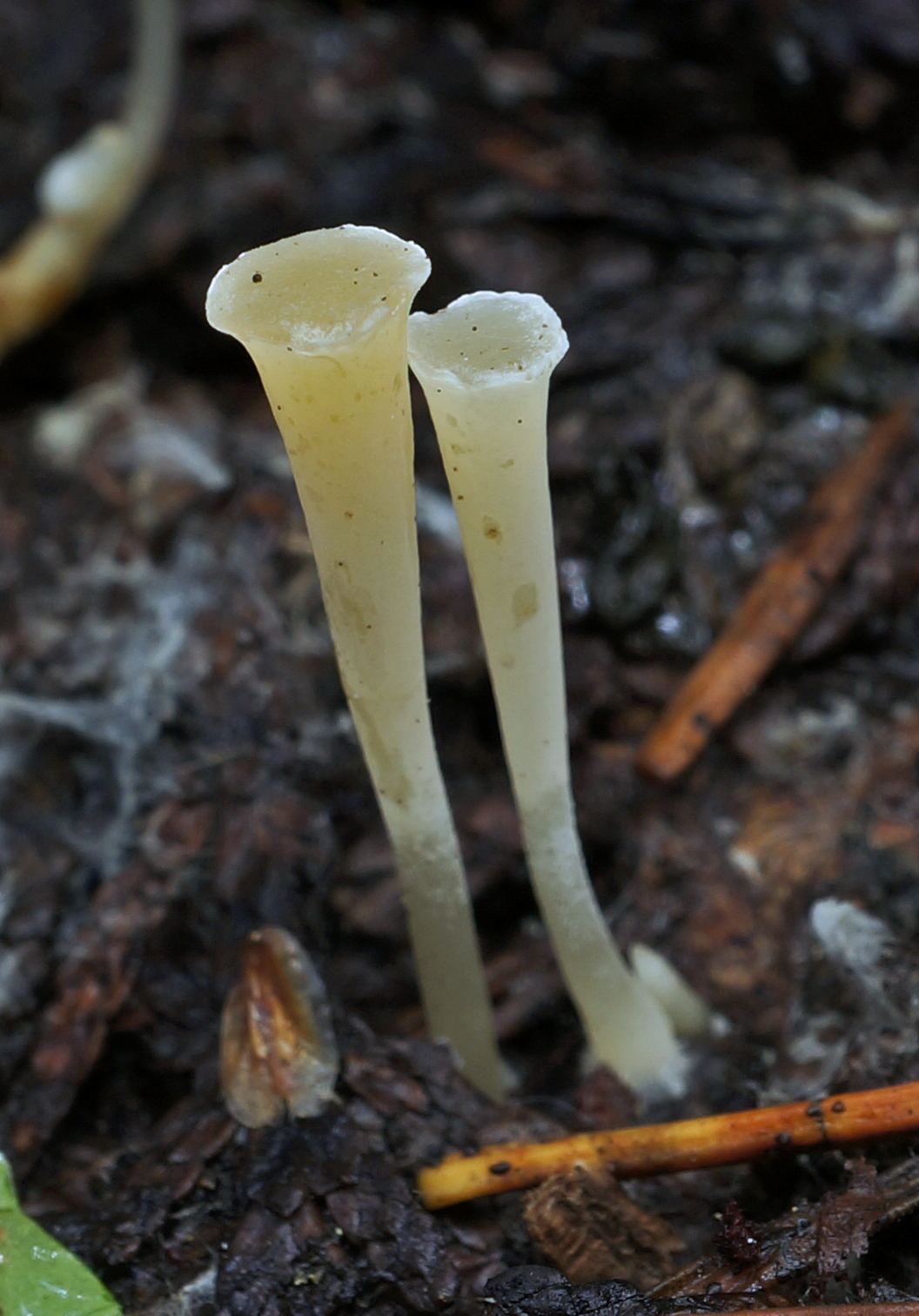
Clavicorona taxophila

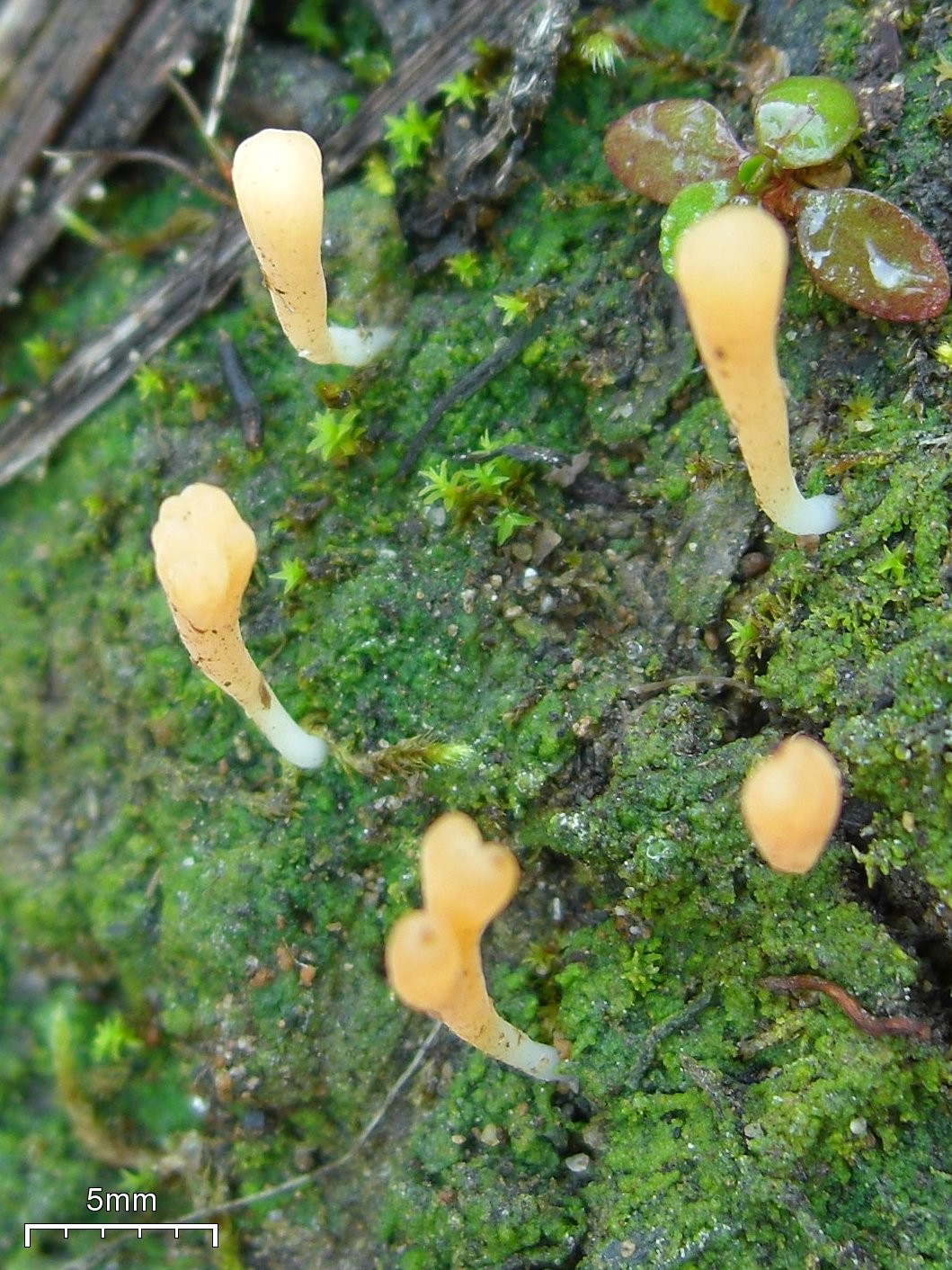
Multiclavula vernalis

Multiclavula mucida shares similarities with the Japanese species Multiclavula petricola. They resemble each other in the colour and general structure of their fruiting bodies, which are typically white and primarily unbranched. However, the two species differ significantly in the size of their basidiospores: those of M. mucida measure 4.5–7.7 μm in length, which are shorter than the 7.3–9.5 μm-basidiospores of M. petricola. Additionally, while M. mucida typically grows on decaying wood, M. petricola prefers rocky substrates. Multiclavula vernalis, while somewhat similar in appearance to M. mucida, is distinguished by its orange colour, its preference for growing on soil, and the presence of cystidia. Multiclavula coronilla, which grows on similar substrates, bears resemblance but can be differentiated by its shorter and simpler (unbranched) fruiting bodies, which are up to 1 cm tall, and its by its basidia, which have 6 to 8 sterigmata. Differentiating these two species typically requires microscopic examination.

Another species resembling M. mucida is Clavicorona taxophila. This small, whitish species, characterised by a broadened, flattened tip, typically grows on twigs, needles, and other types of debris, rather than amidst scum on rotting wood. In the Neotropics, M. mucida closely resembles Sulzbacheromyces leucodontium in appearance. However, their ecological preferences differ; M. mucida mainly grows on decaying logs, while S. leucodontium typically inhabits terrestrial environments in lowland and sub-lowland forests. Additionally, Multiclavula species are more commonly found in mountainous regions.

== Habitat and distribution ==
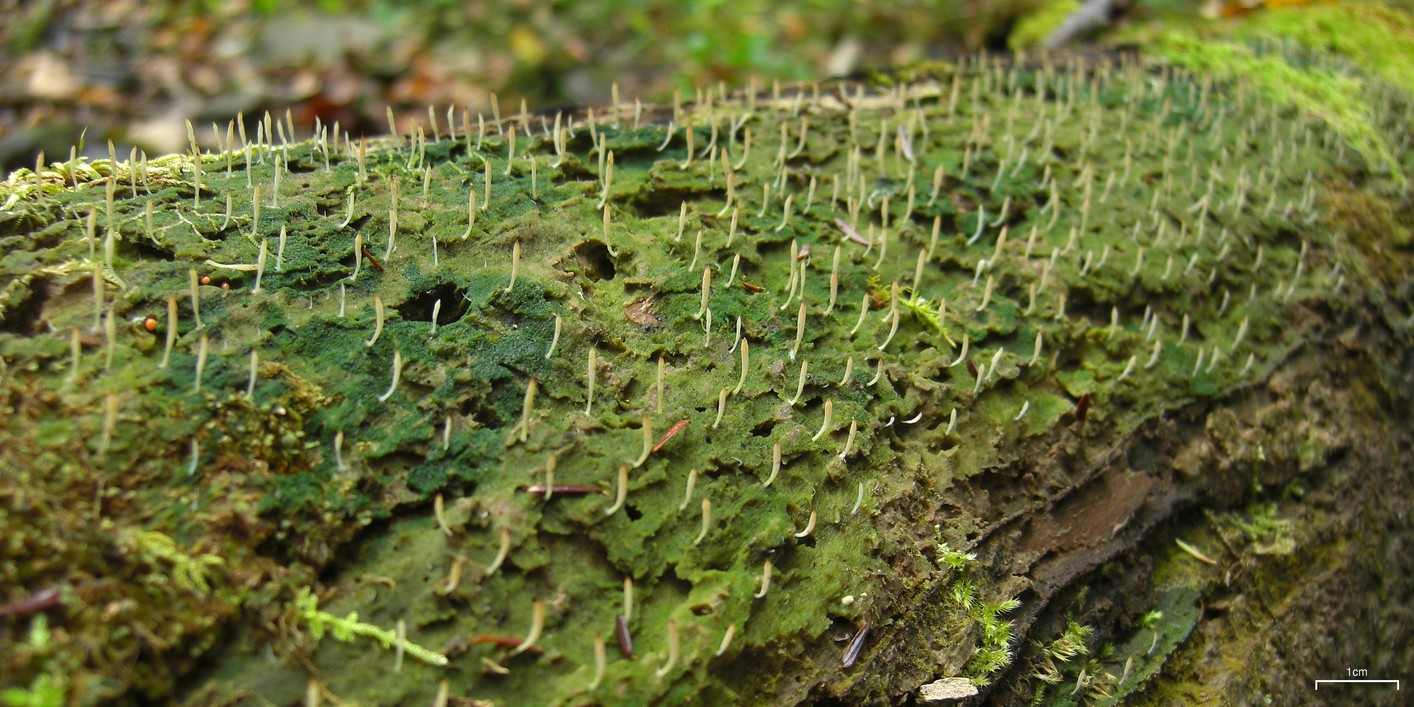
The fungus fruiting gregariously on a rotting log in Big Run State Park, Maryland, US

This species is commonly found on decomposing wood, often in the presence of algae. It thrives on a wide variety of substrates, including bamboo, beech, cedar, poplar, and oak. In Central Europe, coniferous wood is a particularly favoured substrate. M. mucida is widely distributed, found in Asia, Europe, North and South America, and possibly Australia, with its North American range extending as far north as Alaska. The discovery of M. mucida at unusually low elevations, specifically around 130 to 135 m (427 to 443 ft) above sea level in the Bienwald area of Rhineland-Palatinate, has prompted a reevaluation of its distribution and naming inconsistencies across different scientific literatures. Unlike other members of its genus, which prefer sandy soils, this species predominantly relies on rotting wood in moist environments. Lothar Geitler first identified this species as an extratropical lichen in 1955, challenging the then-prevailing view that basidiolichens were exclusively tropical.

Previously considered native to Northern Europe and the mountains of Central Europe, M. mucida has been increasingly observed across most European countries and globally. This expansion in its geographical range could be attributed to the establishment and maintenance of natural forest reserves, environments that foster the decay of thick logs and provide suitable habitats for the fungus. In addition to its growing presence in traditional locales, the species has been documented in regions as far-reaching as Australia, including Tasmania, and New Zealand.

Historically, however, the species has faced declines due to intensive forestry and environmental pollution, such as soil acidification from sulfur dioxide emissions, which damage its natural habitats.

== Conservation ==
Multiclavula mucida has been categorised differently in mycological and lichenological circles, leading to its varying status in conservation lists. In Germany, for example, it has been listed under different categories in the Red List of endangered plants and macrofungi, reflecting a disparity in its assessment between being recognised as a fungus and as a lichen. In Finland's Regional Red List, it is classified as endangered, with a population size of less than 2,500 individuals and a continual decline. In Lithuania, it is considered very rare, being limited to only 1–3 known localities, and in Estonia, it is categorised as vulnerable. In the latter country, it is considered an indicator of old-growth forest. These primeval forests, where the lichen is found, are increasingly rare in Europe and are mainly preserved in nature reserves. Because of its small size and seasonal appearance, M. mucida has been described as inconspicuous and easy to overlook.
