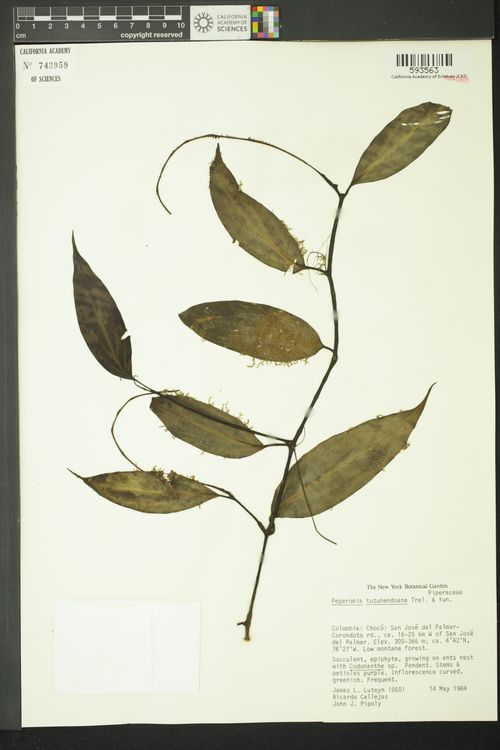

Scientific classification
- Kingdom: Plantae
- Clade: Tracheophytes
- Clade: Angiosperms
- Clade: Magnoliids
- Order: Piperales
- Family: Piperaceae
- Genus: Peperomia
- Species: P. tutunendoana

Binomial name
- Peperomia tutunendoana Trel. & Yunck.

= Peperomia tutunendoana =

Species of epiphyte

Peperomia tutunendoana is a species of epiphyte in the genus Peperomia. It was first described by William Trelease & Truman G. Yuncker and published in the book "The Piperaceae of northern South America 2: 660, f. 577. 1950". It primarily grows on wet tropical biomes. The species name came from Tutunendo, where first specimens of this species were collected. It is used as medication and has environmental uses.

== Distribution ==
It is endemic to Colombia and Peru. First specimens where found at an altitude of 80 meters in Tutunendo.

- Colombia
  - Antioquia
    - Rionegro
    - Dabeiba
    - Jardín
    - Tarazá
  - Chocó
    - San José del Palmar
    - Quibdó
    - Acandí
    - Nóvita
  - Cundinamarca
- Peru
  - San Martín
