= Sulzbacheromyces caatingae =

Scientific classification
- Kingdom: Fungi
- Division: Basidiomycota
- Class: Agaricomycetes
- Order: Lepidostromatales
- Family: Lepidostromataceae
- Genus: Sulzbacheromyces
- Species: S. caatingae

Binomial name
- Sulzbacheromyces caatingae (Sulzbacher & Lücking) B.P.Hodk. & Lücking (2013)

Synonyms
- Lepidostroma caatingae Sulzbacher & Lücking (2012)

Species of lichen

Sulzbacheromyces caatingae is a species of basidiolichen in the family Lepidostromataceae. Discovered in 2012 in northeastern Brazil, it is characterised by its thin green crustose thallus and distinctive orange-pink, club-shaped reproductive structures. The species has a broad ecological amplitude, occurring across different vegetation types from the semi-arid Caatinga to humid Atlantic Forest fragments, where it grows on soil banks and termite nests near forest edges. As the type species of the genus Sulzbacheromyces, it represents a unique evolutionary lineage within the order Lepidostromatales and can be distinguished from similar-looking species by its undifferentiated thallus structure and association with green algae.

== Taxonomy ==
Sulzbacheromyces caatingae was originally described in 2012 as Lepidostroma caatingae, based on specimens collected by Marcelo Sulzbacher in March 2011 from Parque Nacional Serra das Confusões, Caracol, in the state of Piauí, Brazil. The holotype is preserved at the UFRN herbarium (UFRN-Fungos 1478) with an isotype deposited at the Field Museum (F).

The specific epithet caatingae refers to the Caatinga biome of northeastern Brazil where the species was first discovered. In 2014, the species was transferred to the newly established genus Sulzbacheromyces, becoming its type species. The generic name honours Marcelo Sulzbacher, the Brazilian mycologist who discovered the type species.

The species represents a unique lineage within the order Lepidostromatales, a group of lichenised fungi in the Basidiomycota. It differs from the related genus Lepidostroma in having an entirely crustose, undifferentiated thallus that lacks both cortex and medullary structures. While superficially similar to species of Multiclavula in the order Cantharellales, molecular phylogenetics analyses confirm its placement within Lepidostromatales.

Molecular studies using internal transcribed spacer (ITS) sequences have shown that specimens from various localities across northeastern Brazil represent a single, genetically uniform species, despite occurring in different vegetation types. The species forms a weakly supported sister relationship to Lepidostroma akagerae in phylogenetic analyses. Along with its distinctive morphology, this phylogenetic position supports its recognition as a separate genus within Lepidostromatales.

== Description ==
The species forms two distinct structures: a vegetative body (the thallus) that exists year-round, and reproductive structures (the basidiomata) that appear seasonally. The thallus appears as a thin green crust growing on the substrate, lacking any internal differentiation into distinct layers. This simple structure distinguishes it from related species which have more complex, scale-like thalli. The thallus contains single-celled green algae (the photobiont) that form a symbiotic relationship with the fungus. The reproductive structures (basidiomata) are club-shaped and unbranched, reaching 20–30 mm in height and 1.0–1.5 mm in diameter. They are either cylindrical or slightly flattened, and their surface shows a distinctive pattern of circumferential cracks reminiscent of an old carrot. The basidiomata are dull orange-pink in colour with a dull yellow interior.

Under the microscope, several distinctive features can be observed. The spore-producing cells (basidia) are club-shaped (clavate), measuring 23–45 by 4–7 micrometres (μm), and bear two to four projections (sterigmata) on which spores develop. The spores themselves (basidiospores) typically measure 5.0–8.0 by 3.5-4.5 μm and are ellipsoid to elongated in shape, sometimes appearing cylindrical. The internal tissue is composed of parallel, densely packed fungal threads (hyphae) that appear yellowish when viewed in mass but individually are colourless. Unlike many related fungi, the hyphae lack specialised connecting structures called clamp connections.

The species can be distinguished from the superficially similar genus Multiclavula by its undifferentiated thallus structure and its association with green algae, rather than the blue-green algae found in Multiclavula. Additionally, while both genera produce similar club-shaped reproductive structures, those of S. caatingae tend to be more orange in colour.

== Habitat and distribution ==
Sulzbacheromyces caatingae is known from northeastern Brazil, where it occurs across several distinct vegetation types. The species was first discovered in the Parque Nacional Serra das Confusões in Piauí state, within the semi-arid Caatinga biome. It has subsequently been found in several other locations, including the Araripe National Forest in Ceará state, the Mata do Pau-Ferro ecological reserve in Paraíba state, and the Campus I forest fragments of the Federal University of Paraíba. It was recorded from Mato Grosso do Sul in 2023.

The species shows considerable ecological amplitude, occurring in three main habitat types: the semi-arid Caatinga proper, upland wet forest enclaves within the Caatinga (known locally as brejos de 'altitude'), and remnants of Atlantic Forest. This distribution spans areas with significantly different rainfall patterns, from the predominantly dry Caatinga with its 7–9 month dry season to the more humid Atlantic forest fragments.

Within these habitats, S. caatingae typically grows on roadside soil banks and on termite nests, usually near the edges of well-preserved forest. It grows gregariously, meaning multiple individuals occur together, and the development of its reproductive structures appears to be triggered by rainfall. Despite the marked differences in climate and vegetation between its known localities, molecular studies suggest that populations across these different habitats represent a single, genetically uniform species.

The species' ability to grow in both semi-arid and humid environments makes it unusual among lichenised fungi, as most basidiolichen species typically occur in consistently humid habitats. Its presence in the Caatinga biome is particularly noteworthy, as this ecosystem is considered one of the most threatened in the Americas, with over 50% of its original area converted for human use and only 1% protected.
