= Multiclavula ichthyiformis =

Scientific classification
- Kingdom: Fungi
- Division: Basidiomycota
- Class: Agaricomycetes
- Order: Cantharellales
- Family: Hydnaceae
- Genus: Multiclavula
- Species: M. ichthyiformis

Binomial name
- Multiclavula ichthyiformis Nelsen, Lücking, L.Umaña, Trest & Will-Wolf (2007)

Species of lichen

Multiclavula ichthyiformis is a rare terricolous (ground-dwelling) basidiolichen in the family Hygrophoraceae. The lichen produces small, flesh-coloured fruit bodies with flattened, fishtail-shaped tops that grow directly from the soil surface and bear spherical spores on their undersurface. Endemic to a high-elevation bog in Costa Rica, it was discovered in 2007 during a biodiversity survey and remains known only from this single mountain location.

== Taxonomy ==
The lichen was discovered during the TICOLICHEN biodiversity inventory and formally described in 2007 by Matthew Nelsen and colleagues. The type material was gathered at 2,700 m (8,900 ft) elevation on the Talamanca Ridge (Macizo de la Muerte sector, Tapantí National Park, Cartago Province). Its epithet, ichthyiformis, alludes to the dorsal outline of the basidiocarp, whose widening lamina evokes a fish's tail. Morphologically the species departs from other Multiclavula taxa in several ways: the hymenium is restricted to the ventral surface rather than being amphigenous; the stipe is densely tomentose and cloaked in minute, scalelike bulbils; and the spherical basidiospores (4–6 μm in diameter) contrast with the predominantly ellipsoid spores of others in the genus.

Molecular analysis of the internal transcribed spacer (ITS) region places M. ichthyiformis within the Clavulinaceae and as sister to the three previously sequenced species of Multiclavula. Various statistical methods both recover the taxon on a well-supported branch inside the cantharelloid clade (order Cantharellales), confirming that its unusual morphology evolved within the established Multiclavula lineage.

A 2020 study describing the rock-dwelling Multiclavula petricola produced an internal transcribed spacer-based phylogeny that again recovered a strongly supported Multiclavula clade. In that tree M. ichthyiformis emerged on a basal branch together with M. petricola, although their pairing itself lacked statistical backing. Only limited identity between their ITS sequences were identified, emphasizing that the Costa Rican bog lichen and the Japanese rock species are genetically well separated.

== Description ==
The thallus of M. ichthyiformis forms a thin, greenish film—rarely more than 5 cm (2 in) across—composed of densely packed cells of the unicellular green algal genus Coccomyxa. Each alga is ensheathed by a single hyphal layer, creating microscopic bulbils that also appear on the stipe and lamina. Photobiont cells are broadly ellipsoid (7–9 × 4–7 μm) and frequently divide by autospory. Fungal hyphae within the thallus are hyaline, thin-walled, and sparsely branched.

Basidiocarps occur singly on the soil surface. The stipe, 2–5 mm tall and up to 0.7 mm thick, is flesh-coloured when moist and turns translucent white on drying; its surface is lined with pointed scales 0.1–0.4 mm long that incorporate algal cells. Above the stipe the lamina abruptly widens to 0.9–1.9 mm, forming a flat, dorsiventral blade 0.6–4 mm high. The sterile upper face carries a thin gelatinised cortex overlain by orange-brown crystalline aggregates, which impart an ochraceous hue in the dry state, whereas the lower face bears the hymenium. Basidia (spore-bearing cells) are somewhat urn-shaped (urniform) (25–35 × 7–10 μm) and usually six-spored; basidiospores are smooth, thin-walled, spherical, and hyaline. Hyphae in the context are tightly parallel and agglutinated, measuring 3–4 μm wide in the lamina and 1.5–2 μm in the scales and outer stipe.

== Habitat and distribution ==
Multiclavula ichthyiformis is known only from its type locality, a disturbed peat bog in upper montane rainforest just below the páramo zone on the Pacific slope of the Cordillera de Talamanca. It grows on persistently moist, acid soil along a small brook and on a roadside bank, typically among bryophyte cushions. Associated ground-dwelling lichens include Cladia aggregata, Cladonia confusa, Dictyonema glabratum, Icmadophila aversa, Phyllobaeis imbricata, and Siphula ceratites. The habitat—a remnant of high-elevation bogs scattered along the Inter-American crest—is considered ecologically sensitive owing to ongoing land-use pressures and climatic change.
