= Sulzbacheromyces fossicola =

Scientific classification
- Domain: Eukaryota
- Kingdom: Fungi
- Division: Basidiomycota
- Class: Agaricomycetes
- Order: Lepidostromatales
- Family: Lepidostromataceae
- Genus: Sulzbacheromyces
- Species: S. fossicola

Binomial name
- Sulzbacheromyces fossicola (Corner) D.Liu & Li S.Wang (2017)

Synonyms
- Clavaria fossicola Corner (1950); Multiclavula fossicola (Corner) R.H.Petersen (1967)

Species of lichen

Sulzbacheromyces fossicola is a species of basidiolichen in the family Lepidostromataceae. First described in 1950 by E. J. H. Corner as Clavaria fossicola, it is characterised by its dark green to indigo blue crusty growth form and distinctive white, club-shaped fruiting bodies that turn beige when dried. The species forms a thin layer on soil or rocks, where it lives in symbiosis with microscopic green algae. It is distributed across tropical and subtropical Asia, from India to Singapore, where it specifically grows on exposed yellow and red clay soils in shaded locations. The species was transferred to Sulzbacheromyces in 2017 based on molecular and morphological evidence.

== Taxonomy ==
The lichen was first described as a new species in 1950 by E. J. H. Corner as Clavaria fossicola. Ron Petersen reclassified it in the genus Multiclavula in 1967. Dong Liu and Lisong Wang transferred it to genus Sulzbacheromyces in 2017. Although they published the name with the spelling "fossicolus", it was corrected to "fossicola". It is closely related to S. bicolor but can be distinguished by its uniformly white colouration and the absence of a silvery coating (prothallus) on its surface. Unlike S. bicolor, it also lacks specialised fungal connections called clamp connections in its cellular structure.

== Description ==
The organism forms a distinct crusty layer (thallus) on its substrate, covering areas of 5–30 cm in diameter. This crust appears dark green to indigo blue and becomes darker with age. It contains clusters of single-celled green algae (known as chlorococcoid algae) that are nearly spherical or elliptical in shape and are surrounded by transparent fungal threads (hyphae). The most conspicuous features are its upright fruiting bodies, which are club-shaped or cylindrical, occasionally branching from the base. These structures reach 0.3–2.5 cm in height and are pale to creamy white when fresh, turning beige when dried. Under the microscope, the reproductive cells (basidia) produce transparent, elliptical spores and possess 2–4 delicate protrusions (sterigmata) through which spores are released.

== Habitat and distribution ==
Sulzbacheromyces fossicola is found across tropical and subtropical regions of Asia, including China, Singapore, northern India, and Thailand. It specifically grows on yellow and red clay soils or rocks that have been exposed to the elements for two to three years, preferring shaded locations. While initially discovered in Singapore in 1950, subsequent discoveries have shown it to be widespread across southern Asia, though its preferred habitat requirements may limit its local abundance.
