= Sulzbacheromyces =

Scientific classification
- Kingdom: Fungi
- Division: Basidiomycota
- Class: Agaricomycetes
- Order: Lepidostromatales
- Family: Lepidostromataceae
- Genus: Sulzbacheromyces; B.P.Hodk. & Lücking (2013)

Type species
- Sulzbacheromyces caatingae (Sulzbacher & Lücking) B.P.Hodk. & Lücking (2014)

Genus of lichen-forming fungi

Sulzbacheromyces is a genus of basidiolichens in the family Lepidostromataceae (the only family within the fungal order Lepidostromatales). The genus is distinguished from the other genera of Lepidostromataceae (Ertzia and Lepidostroma) by having an entirely crustose thallus and from Multiclavula (Cantharellales) by having a chlorococcoid (instead of coccomyxoid) photobiont. The type species grows on soil in the neotropics.

== Description ==
The genus Sulzbacheromyces is characterised by its simple, crustose thallus which lacks any internal differentiation, having neither cortex nor medullary tissue. This thallus structure distinguishes it from the related basidiolichen genus Lepidostroma, which has a squamulose (scaly) thallus.

The reproductive structures (basidiomata) are clavarioid to caloceroid (club-shaped), unbranched, and typically coloured yellow to orange. The internal structure of the basidiomata consists of parallel, thin-walled, occasionally clamped hyphae that form a densely agglutinated central strand and a loosely organized 'medullary' tissue. The fruiting body cortex is distinctly three-layered, composed of a thin, dense, brownish outer layer, a broader, hyaline (translucent) middle layer with large interspaces, and a thin, dense, pale yellowish inner layer.

The genus forms a symbiotic relationship with green algae (chlorococcoid photobionts). In the type species, S. caatingae, the photobiont belongs to the genus Bracteacoccus, representing the first known occurrence of this typically freshwater algal genus in a lichen symbiosis.

== Species ==
- Sulzbacheromyces bicolor D.Liu, Li S.Wang & Goffinet (2017) – China
- Sulzbacheromyces caatingae (Sulzbacher & Lücking) B.P.Hodk. & Lücking (2013) – Neotropics
- Sulzbacheromyces chocoensis Coca, Lücking & B.Moncada (2018) – Colombia
- Sulzbacheromyces fossicola (Corner) D.Liu & Li S.Wang (2017) – Singapore
- Sulzbacheromyces leucodontius Coca, Gómez-Gómez, Guzmán-Guillermo & Dal Forno (2023) – Colombia
- Sulzbacheromyces miomboensis De Kesel & Ertz (2017) – Democratic Republic of Congo
- Sulzbacheromyces sinensis (R.H.Petersen & M.Zang) D.Liu & Li S.Wang (2017) – Asia
- Sulzbacheromyces tutunendo Coca, Lücking & B.Moncada (2018) – Colombia
- Sulzbacheromyces yunnanensis D.Liu, Li S.Wang & Goffinet (2017) – China
