= Multiclavula caput-serpentis =

Scientific classification
- Domain: Eukaryota
- Kingdom: Fungi
- Division: Basidiomycota
- Class: Agaricomycetes
- Order: Cantharellales
- Family: Hydnaceae
- Genus: Multiclavula
- Species: M. caput-serpentis

Binomial name
- Multiclavula caput-serpentis Lotz-Winter & Reschke (2021)

Species of lichen

Multiclavula caput-serpentis is a species of terricolous (ground-dwelling) basidiolichen in the family Hydnaceae. Found in Panama, it was formally described as a new species in 2021 by Hermine Lotz-Winter and Kai Reschke. The type specimen was collected between Cerro Punta and Bajo Boquete (Sendero Los Quetzales, Chiriquí Province) at an elevation of 2,350 m (7,710 ft); here, in a cloud forest on the north slopes of the Volcán Barú, it was found growing on moist, loamy soil. The species epithet, which combines the Latin roots caput ("head") and serpens ("snake"), alludes to the shape of the fruitbodies.
