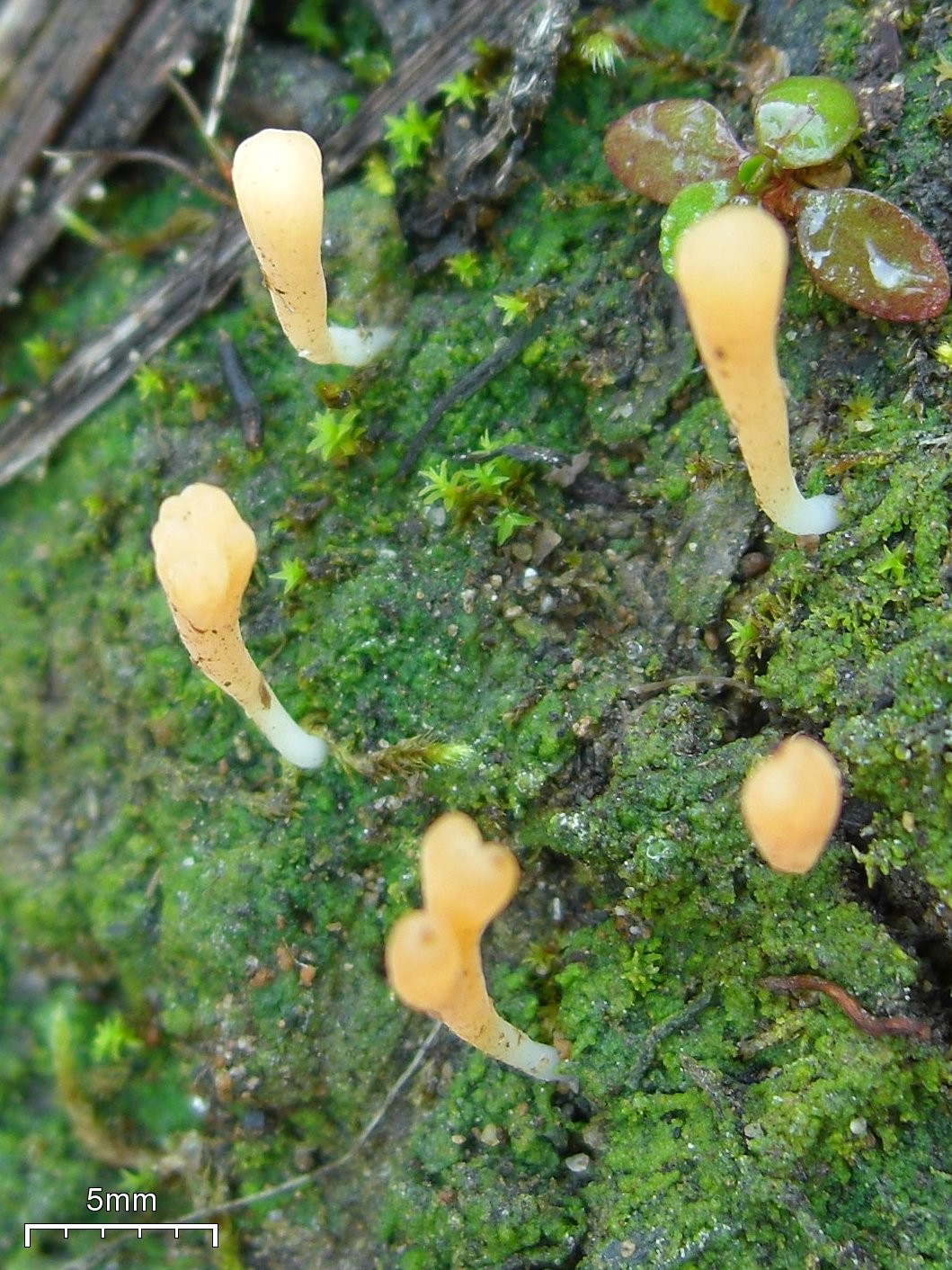

Scientific classification
- Domain: Eukaryota
- Kingdom: Fungi
- Division: Basidiomycota
- Class: Agaricomycetes
- Order: Cantharellales
- Family: Hydnaceae
- Genus: Multiclavula
- Species: M. vernalis

Binomial name
- Multiclavula vernalis (Schwein.) R.H.Petersen (1967)

Synonyms
- Clavaria vernalis Schwein. (1822); Clavulinopsis vernalis (Schwein.) Corner (1950); Stichoclavaria vernalis (Schwein.) Paechn. (1987)

= Multiclavula vernalis =

Species of fungus

Multiclavula vernalis or the orange club-mushroom lichen is a species of clavarioid fungus in the Clavulinaceae (club-mushroom lichen) family. It was originally named as a species of Clavaria in 1822 by Lewis David de Schweinitz. Ronald H. Petersen transferred it to Multiclavula in 1967.
