= Sulzbacheromyces sinensis =

Scientific classification
- Domain: Eukaryota
- Kingdom: Fungi
- Division: Basidiomycota
- Class: Agaricomycetes
- Order: Lepidostromatales
- Family: Lepidostromataceae
- Genus: Sulzbacheromyces
- Species: S. sinensis

Binomial name
- Sulzbacheromyces sinensis (R.H.Petersen & M.Zang) D.Liu & Li S.Wang (2017)

Synonyms
- Multiclavula sinensis R.H.Petersen & M.Zang (1986); Lepidostroma asianum Yanaga & N.Maek. (2014)

Species of lichen

Sulzbacheromyces sinensis is a species of basidiolichen in the family Lepidostromataceae. It is found in Asia.

== Taxonomy ==
The species was first scientifically described in 1986 by the mycologists Ron Petersen and Mu Zang, who initially classified it in the genus Multiclavula. Dong Liu and Lisong Wang transferred it to genus Sulzbacheromyces in 2017. The species shows considerable variation in its appearance depending on environmental conditions, and was also independently described from Japan as Lepidostroma asianum, which is now considered a synonym.

== Description ==
The organism forms a distinctive crusty layer on its substrate, covering areas of 5–70 cm in diameter. This crust appears green to dark green when fresh but becomes silvery and shiny when dried, with a distinctive white to grey coating. The most conspicuous features are its upright fruiting bodies, which reach up to 5.5 cm in height. These structures are yellow to reddish-orange when fresh, turning ochre when dried, and occasionally branch at the tip. They emerge from a pale grey to pink patch and always have a white woolly coating at their base. Each fruiting body develops cracks around its circumference when mature and has a blunt tip that becomes pointed when young or exposed to direct sunlight. The fungus has no distinct taste but produces a mushroom-like odour.

== Habitat and distribution ==
Sulzbacheromyces sinensis is found across tropical and subtropical regions of East Asia, including various provinces of China (Yunnan, Hainan, Fujian) as well as Taiwan and Japan. It grows specifically on red sandy soil and around the base of rocks, particularly in areas that have been exposed for two to three years in newly cultivated areas. The species shows considerable adaptability to different environmental conditions, with its appearance varying notably depending on whether it grows on soil or rock, in direct or indirect light, and in high or low humidity environments.
