= Multiclavula petricola =

Scientific classification
- Kingdom: Fungi
- Division: Basidiomycota
- Class: Agaricomycetes
- Order: Cantharellales
- Family: Hydnaceae
- Genus: Multiclavula
- Species: M. petricola

Binomial name
- Multiclavula petricola H.Masumoto & Y.Degawa (2020)

Species of lichen

Multiclavula petricola is a saxicolous (rock-dwelling) basidiolichen in the family Hygrophoraceae. It is known only from a single subalpine site in central Japan, where minute, white, needle-like fruit bodies emerge directly from wet volcanic rock and are accompanied by a globular algal–fungal thallus. Microscopic characters, a distinctive globose photobiont association, and molecular data together justify its recognition as a separate species within Multiclavula.

== Taxonomy ==
Multiclavula petricola was discovered during a survey of basidiolichens in the subalpine zone of Katashina (Gunma Prefecture, Honshū). The holotype, collected in September 2019 at 1,757 m (5,764 ft) on wet andesite, was formally described in 2020 by Hiroshi Masumoto and Yousuke Degawa. The epithet petricola (Latin for 'rock-dweller') reflects its strictly saxicolous habit, while the Japanese vernacular name イワノシラツノ (Iwano-shiratsuno) literally means 'white horns on rock'.

Molecular phylogenetic analyses of the internal transcribed spacer (ITS) and large-subunit ribosomal DNA place M. petricola in a well-supported clade with other lichenised Multiclavula species. In maximum-likelihood and Bayesian reconstructions, it is sister to M. ichthyiformis, with that clade falling as sister to all other Multiclavula species. However, the relationship between M. petricola and M. ichthyformis lacks significant support. The combination of a saxicolous substrate, 4–6-spored basidia, and relatively large, narrowly cylindrical basidiospores distinguishes the taxon from all other recognised members of Multiclavula.

== Description ==
Fruit bodies of M. petricola are scattered over the rock surface, simple and unbranched (rarely forked), clavarioid to fusiform, and 2.9–6.1 mm tall by 0.3–0.6 mm thick. They are pure white, fleshy when fresh, and become slightly translucent towards the base; the apex tapers to a fine awl-shape. The stipe, up to 2.7 mm long, is composed of parallel, heavily agglutinated, thin-walled hyphae (1.5–3.5 μm wide) with frequent clamp connections. A hymenium 40–60 μm thick lines the outer surface of the fertile portion. Basidia are 26–49 × 5–8 μm, clavate with a tapering base, and bear (2)4–6 sterigmata that are 2.9–5.3 μm long. Basidiospores are hyaline, smooth, thin-walled, elongate to slightly cylindrical, 6.1–11.3 × 3.1–4.6 μm.

The lichenised thallus forms minute, gelatinous globules (12–39 μm diameter) that surround the bases of the fruit bodies. Each globule comprises a handful of more or less spherical to broadly ellipsoid green-algal cells (6–10 μm diam.) containing a conspicuous pyrenoid; these are enveloped by a lace-like sheath of fungal hyphae 1.2–4.6 μm thick. In culture, basidiospores germinate readily on water agar, and multispore isolates grow slowly on potato dextrose agar, forming whitish, felted colonies 5–7 mm across after two months at 15 °C.

== Habitat and distribution ==
The species is known only from its type locality, a shaded, north-facing talus slope on the flank of Mount Akagi, near Katashina village. The site lies within a cool, moist coniferous forest dominated by Abies species, where constant seepage keeps the volcanic andesite perpetually damp. Fruit bodies appear in early autumn, erupting directly from moss-free rock surfaces, while no thalli have been observed on adjacent soil or vegetation.

Ecologically, M. petricola occupies a niche quite unlike that of most other Multiclavula species, which are typically associated with soil, decaying wood, or bryophytes. The reliance on permanently wet rock implies sensitivity to desiccation and suggests the lichen could be vulnerable to microhabitat disturbance or shifts in moisture regime. Future surveys in comparable subalpine habitats of central Honshū may clarify whether the distribution is genuinely narrow or merely under-recorded.
