= Ertzia =

Scientific classification
- Kingdom: Fungi
- Division: Basidiomycota
- Class: Agaricomycetes
- Order: Lepidostromatales
- Family: Lepidostromataceae
- Genus: Ertzia; B.P.Hodk. & Lücking (2014)
- Species: E. akagerae

Binomial name
- Ertzia akagerae (Eb.Fisch., Ertz, Killmann & Sérus.) B.P.Hodk. & Lücking (2014)

Synonyms
- Multiclavula akagerae Eb.Fisch., Ertz, Killmann & Sérus. (2007); Lepidostroma akagerae (Eb.Fisch., Ertz, Killmann & Sérus.) Ertz, Eb.Fisch., Killmann, Sérus. & Lawrey (2008)

Single-species fungal genus

Ertzia is a monospecific genus in the family Lepidostromataceae (the only family within the fungal order Lepidostromatales). The sole species is Ertzia akagerae, a basidiolichen. The genus was circumscribed in 2014 by Brendan Hodkinson and Robert Lücking. Ertzia is distinguished from all other lichenized clavarioid fungi (Multiclavula (Cantharellales), Lepidostroma (Lepidostromatales), and Sulzbacheromyces (Lepidostromatales)) by having a microsquamulose thallus that forms contiguous glomerules (reminiscent of a 'Botrydina-type' thallus) with a cortex of jigsaw puzzle-shaped cells. Ertzia akagerae grows on soil in the African tropics.

== Taxonomy ==
The genus Ertzia was established by Brendan P. Hodkinson and Robert Lücking in 2014, with E. akagerae as its type, and only, species. The genus name honours the lichenologist Damien Ertz for his important contributions to the understanding of lichenized fungi evolution and classification.

The type species was originally described as Multiclavula akagerae by Fischer and colleagues in 2007, then transferred to Lepidostroma as L. akagerae in 2008, before being designated as the type of the new genus Ertzia in 2014. The type specimen was collected in April 2005 from the foot of Mt. Mutumba in Akagera National Park, Rwanda, and is housed at the National Botanic Garden of Belgium (BR), with isotypes at KOBL and LG.

== Description ==
Ertzia is characterized by its microsquamulose thallus composed of distinct, contiguous glomerules (rounded clusters). A distinctive feature of the genus is its cortex, which is formed by a layer of colourless (hyaline) cells that resemble pieces of a jigsaw puzzle. This cortical structure distinguishes it from Lepidostroma sensu stricto and is somewhat similar to features found in some unrelated lichen genera such as Cora and Dictyonema, though these belong to a different order (Agaricales).

The reproductive structures (basidiomata) are club-shaped (clavarioid) and typically unbranched, though very rare branching may occur. The spores (basidiospores) are ovoid in shape. While superficially similar to the Botrydina-type thallus found in genera such as Multiclavula, Semiomphalina, and some Lichenomphalia species, Ertzia can be distinguished by its larger granules and distinctive jigsaw puzzle-shaped rather than isodiametric-angular cortical cells.
