= Tutunendo =

Tutunendó
- Populated center

- Location in Chocó and Colombia Tutunendó (Colombia)
- Coordinates: 5°44′37.0″N 76°32′16.1″W
- Country: Colombia
- Department: Chocó
- Municipality: Quibdó Municipality
- Elevation: 177 ft (54 m)

Population (2005)
  - Total: 1,764
- Time zone: UTC-5 (Colombia Standard Time)

Tutunendo is a populated center of Colombia of the municipality of Quibdó, located in the department of Chocó. It is located 14 km from Quibdó, on the Quibdó — Medellín road. Declared a site of greater rainfall and biodiversity. Its economic activities are: Agriculture, fishing, exploitation and extraction of minerals and wood resources, and tourism in the weekend season by tourists, mostly from the city of Quibdó.

The township of Tutunendo (Quibdó municipality) is part of the Chocó Biogeographic and has an area of 43 square kilometers, where much of the biodiversity is housed, as it is a humid rain forest. This has made the area considered the main tourist center of the municipality of Quibdó, as an appropriate place for recreation and research for environmental entities.

== Climate ==
Tutunendo has an extremely wet tropical rainforest climate (Af). It is one of the wettest places on earth.

Climate data for Tutunendo
| Month | Jan | Feb | Mar | Apr | May | Jun | Jul | Aug | Sep | Oct | Nov | Dec | Year |
|---|---|---|---|---|---|---|---|---|---|---|---|---|---|
| Mean daily maximum °C (°F) | 30.0 (86.0) | 30.3 (86.5) | 30.6 (87.1) | 30.8 (87.4) | 31.1 (88.0) | 30.9 (87.6) | 31.1 (88.0) | 31.2 (88.2) | 30.9 (87.6) | 30.5 (86.9) | 30.3 (86.5) | 29.8 (85.6) | 30.6 (87.1) |
| Daily mean °C (°F) | 26.4 (79.5) | 26.7 (80.1) | 26.9 (80.4) | 26.9 (80.4) | 27.0 (80.6) | 26.8 (80.2) | 26.8 (80.2) | 26.8 (80.2) | 26.5 (79.7) | 26.3 (79.3) | 26.2 (79.2) | 26.2 (79.2) | 26.6 (79.9) |
| Mean daily minimum °C (°F) | 23.4 (74.1) | 23.4 (74.1) | 23.5 (74.3) | 23.6 (74.5) | 23.5 (74.3) | 23.3 (73.9) | 23.1 (73.6) | 23.1 (73.6) | 23.1 (73.6) | 23.0 (73.4) | 23.1 (73.6) | 23.3 (73.9) | 23.3 (73.9) |
| Average precipitation mm (inches) | 770.0 (30.31) | 661.4 (26.04) | 710.8 (27.98) | 845.4 (33.28) | 952.0 (37.48) | 931.7 (36.68) | 991.5 (39.04) | 964.2 (37.96) | 922.5 (36.32) | 864.7 (34.04) | 970.3 (38.20) | 901.6 (35.50) | 10,486 (412.83) |
| Average precipitation days (≥ 1.0 mm) | 19.4 | 16.9 | 17.6 | 20.0 | 21.8 | 21.2 | 22.6 | 23.6 | 21.3 | 20.8 | 22.9 | 22.6 | 250.5 |
Source 1:
Source 2: Instituto de Hidrologia Meteorologia y Estudios Ambientales (precipitation 1991-2020)
