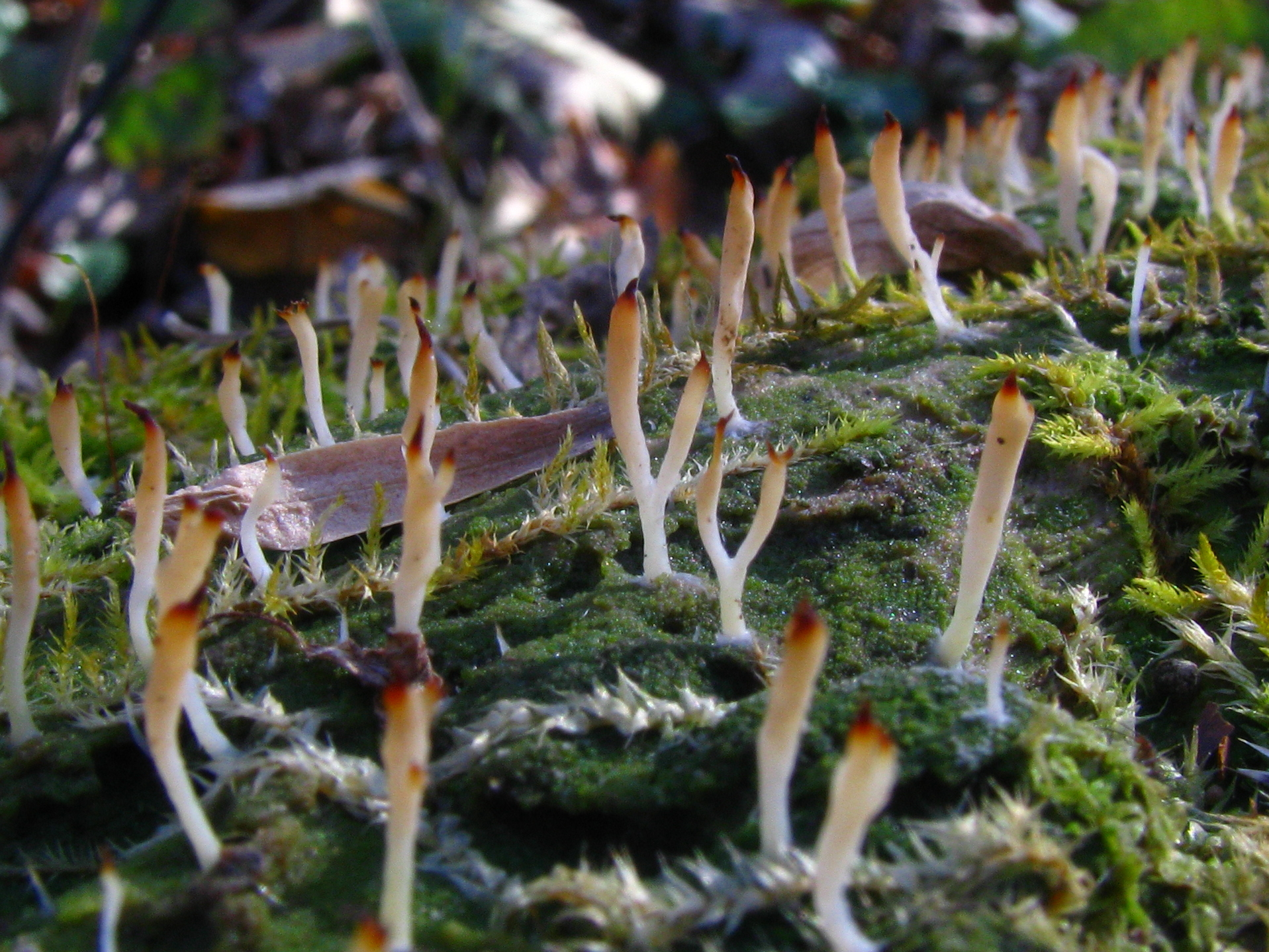
- Multiclavula mucida

Scientific classification
- Kingdom: Fungi
- Division: Basidiomycota
- Class: Agaricomycetes
- Order: Cantharellales
- Family: Hydnaceae
- Genus: Multiclavula; R.H.Petersen (1967)

Type species
- Multiclavula corynoides (Peck) R.H.Petersen (1967)

Species
- 13, see text

= Multiclavula =

Genus of fungi

Multiclavula is a genus of basidiolichens in the family Hydnaceae. The widespread genus contains 14 species. The genus was circumscribed by the American mycologist Ron Petersen in 1967, with Multiclavula corynoides assigned as the type species.

== Description ==
The genus Multiclavula includes basidiolichen fungi known for their small, clavarioid (club-shaped) fruiting bodies, typically reaching up to 3 cm in height and 2 mm in thickness. These structures are generally either unbranched or have sparse branches and come in colours ranging from white to various shades of straw, ochre, or orange. The texture of these fruiting bodies is tough when fresh but becomes brittle once dry.

Internally, the fungi consist of contextual hyphae, which are fungal filaments running parallel and densely packed towards the base, becoming looser towards the top. These hyphae, which make up the main body of the fruiting structures, can be thin-walled or slightly thicker, often branch out and connect with each other (anastomosing), and may possess small bridge-like structures known as clamps. However, not all specimens will have these clamps, and the hyphae can occasionally stick together (agglutinated) without significant swelling.

Beneath the surface layer, subhymenial hyphae run parallel to the contextual hyphae but are typically thinner and straighter, branching off to produce basidia (spore-producing cells) as lateral extensions. These basidia are short and somewhat thick, with poorly developed outgrowths (sterigmata) from which spores are released. The spores of Multiclavula fungi are varied in shape, from ovoid to elongated, and have thin walls. They can contain no guttules (eguttulate) to multiple guttules or appear granular internally, while always remaining smooth and appearing white in spore prints.

== Species ==
- Multiclavula caput-serpentis Lotz-Winter & Reschke (2021)
- Multiclavula clara (Berk. & M.A.Curtis) R.H.Petersen (1967)
- Multiclavula constans (Coker) R.H.Petersen (2019)
- Multiclavula coronilla (G.W.Martin) R.H.Petersen (1967)
- Multiclavula corynoides (Peck) R.H.Petersen (1967)
- Multiclavula delicata (Fr.) R.H.Petersen (1967)
- Multiclavula hastula (Corner) R.H.Petersen (1967)
- Multiclavula ichthyiformis Nelsen, Lücking, L.Umaña, Trest & Will-Wolf (2007) – Costa Rica
- Multiclavula mucida (Pers.) R.H.Petersen (1967)
- Multiclavula petricola H.Masumoto & Y.Degawa (2020) – Japan
- Multiclavula pogonati (Coker) R.H.Petersen (2019)
- Multiclavula samuelsii R.H.Petersen (1988) – New Zealand
- Multiclavula sharpii R.H.Petersen (1967)
- Multiclavula vernalis (Schwein.) R.H.Petersen (1967)

Several species once classified in Multiclavula have since been transferred to other genera. These include:

- Multiclavula afflata (Lagger) R.H.Petersen (1967) = Lentaria afflata
- Multiclavula akagerae Eb.Fisch., Ertz, Killmann & Sérus. (2007) = Ertzia akagerae
- Multiclavula calocera (G.W.Martin) R.H.Petersen (1967) = Lepidostroma calocerum
- Multiclavula fossicola (Corner) R.H.Petersen (1967) = Sulzbacheromyces fossicolus
- Multiclavula rugaramae Eb.Fisch., Ertz, Killmann & Sérus. (2007) = Lepidostroma rugaramae
- Multiclavula sinensis R.H.Petersen & M.Zang (1986) = Sulzbacheromyces sinensis
