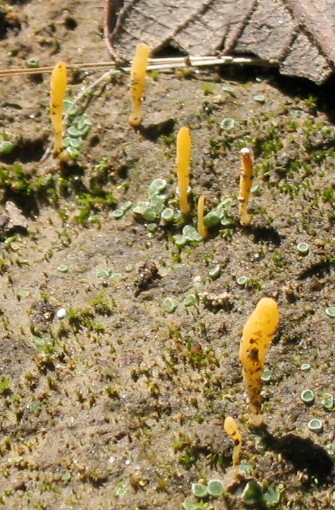
- Lepidostroma vilgalysii Hodkinson

Scientific classification
- Domain: Eukaryota
- Kingdom: Fungi
- Division: Basidiomycota
- Class: Agaricomycetes
- Order: Lepidostromatales; Hodkinson & Lücking (2013)
- Family: Lepidostromataceae; Ertz, Eb.Fischer, Killmann, Sérus. & Lawrey (2008)

Genera
- Ertzia; Lepidostroma; Sulzbacheromyces

= Lepidostromatales =

Order of fungi

Lepidostromatales is an order of fungi in the class Agaricomycetes. It is the only known order of basidiomycete fungi composed entirely of lichenized members. Morphologically, the fruiting bodies of all species are clavarioid. Six species are known, five of which were described within the span of 2007–2013. Due to its morphological similarity to the genus Multiclavula, its isolated phylogenetic position (distinct from all other orders based on molecular data) was not understood until quite recently. The photobionts that have been found in association with members of this group are not known to associate with any other types of lichenized fungi.

== Taxonomy ==
Members of Lepidostromatales closely resemble species of Multiclavula because these groups share a combination of clavarioid fruiting bodies and lichenized thalli. The first species described in the order was originally described in the genus Clavaria due to the clavarioid fungal fruiting body, and was later transferred to Multiclavula (Cantharellales) due to the lichenized thallus. The group was first recognized as distinct on account of the small squamules (scale-like structures) that make up the thallus, and the genus Lepidostroma was created as a result. With the addition of two more squamulose species discovered in tropical Africa, this separation was not accepted and Multiclavula was again emended to include species with squamulose thalli. However, molecular phylogenetic analyses eventually confirmed Lepidostroma as a distinct lineage, Lepidostromataceae, unrelated to Multiclavula. The recent discovery of three further species (for a total of six species), created an opportunity for more in-depth phylogenetic research, which confirmed the isolation of the family from all described orders. As a result, the group was raised to the rank of order (Lepidostromatales).

Although the separation of this group from Multiclavula was originally based on thallus type, further research has demonstrated that members of the group actually have three distinct thallus types, one of which ('crustose-granulose') matches up with Multiclavula. However, the photobiont of Lepidostromatales is chlorococcoid instead of coccomyxoid (which is the type found in Multiclavula), making the photobiont-type a reasonable diagnostic feature for the group. The three thallus types correlate with the current division of the group into three genera:

- Ertzia Hodkinson & Lücking (2013)
- Lepidostroma Mägd. & S.Winkl. (1967)
- Sulzbacheromyces Hodkinson & Lücking (2013)

== Habitat and distribution ==
All known members of the order are lichenized and grow on soil in tropical regions of Africa and the Americas.
